= Fernando Legal =

Brazilian priest (1931–2023)

His Excellency Fernando Legal
- Bishop Emeritus of São Miguel Paulista
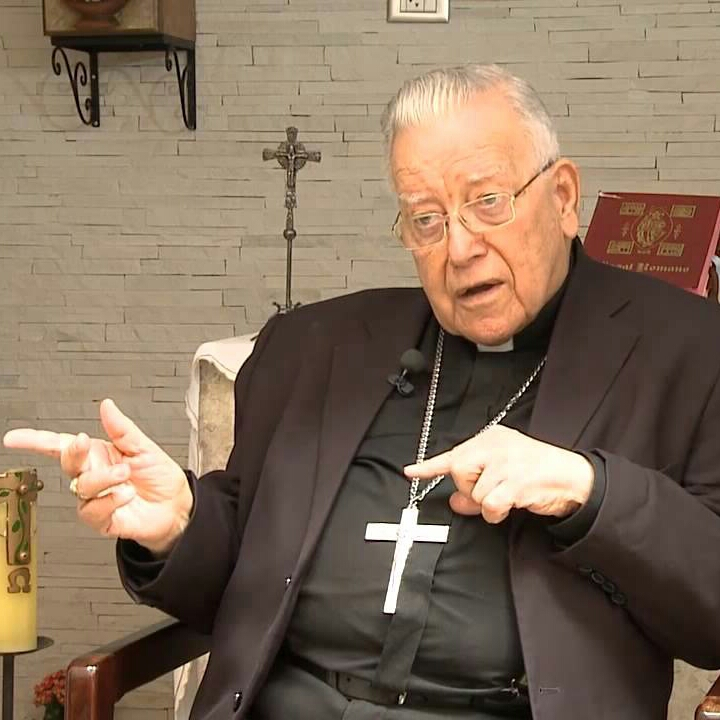
- Metropolis: São Paulo
- Appointed: 15 March 1989
- Term ended: 9 January 2008
- Predecessor: First
- Successor: Manuel Parrado Carral
- Previous posts: Bishop of Itapeva (1980–1985); Bishop of Limeira (1985–1989)

Orders
- Ordination: 8 December 1959 by Paulo Rolim Loureiro
- Consecration: 31 May 1980 by Carmine Rocco

Personal details
- Born: 17 December 1931 São Paulo, Brazil
- Died: 22 August 2023 (aged 91) São Paulo, Brazil

Fernando Legal (17 December 1931 – 22 August 2023) was a Brazilian Roman Catholic prelate. He was bishop of Itapeva from 1980 to 1985, Limeira from 1985 to 1989, and São Miguel Paulista from 1989 to 2008.

Catholic Church titles
Preceded by First	Bishop of São Miguel Paulista; 1989–2008	Succeeded by Manuel Parrado Carral
Preceded by Aloísio Ariovaldo (Tarcísio) Amaral	Bishop of Limeira; 1985–1989	Succeeded by Ercílio Turco
Preceded by José Lambert Filho	Bishop of Itapeva; 1980–1985	Succeeded by Alano Maria Pena
