= Bergonzini =

Bergonzini is an Italian surname. Notable people with the surname include:

- Luiz Gonzaga Bergonzini (1936–2012), Brazilian Roman Catholic bishop
- Mauro Bergonzini (1912–?), Italian footballer
