= Diocese of Presidente Prudente =

Latin Catholic ecclesiastical territory in Brazil

Diocese of Presidente Prudente Dioecesis Prudentipolitana Diocese de Presidente Prudente
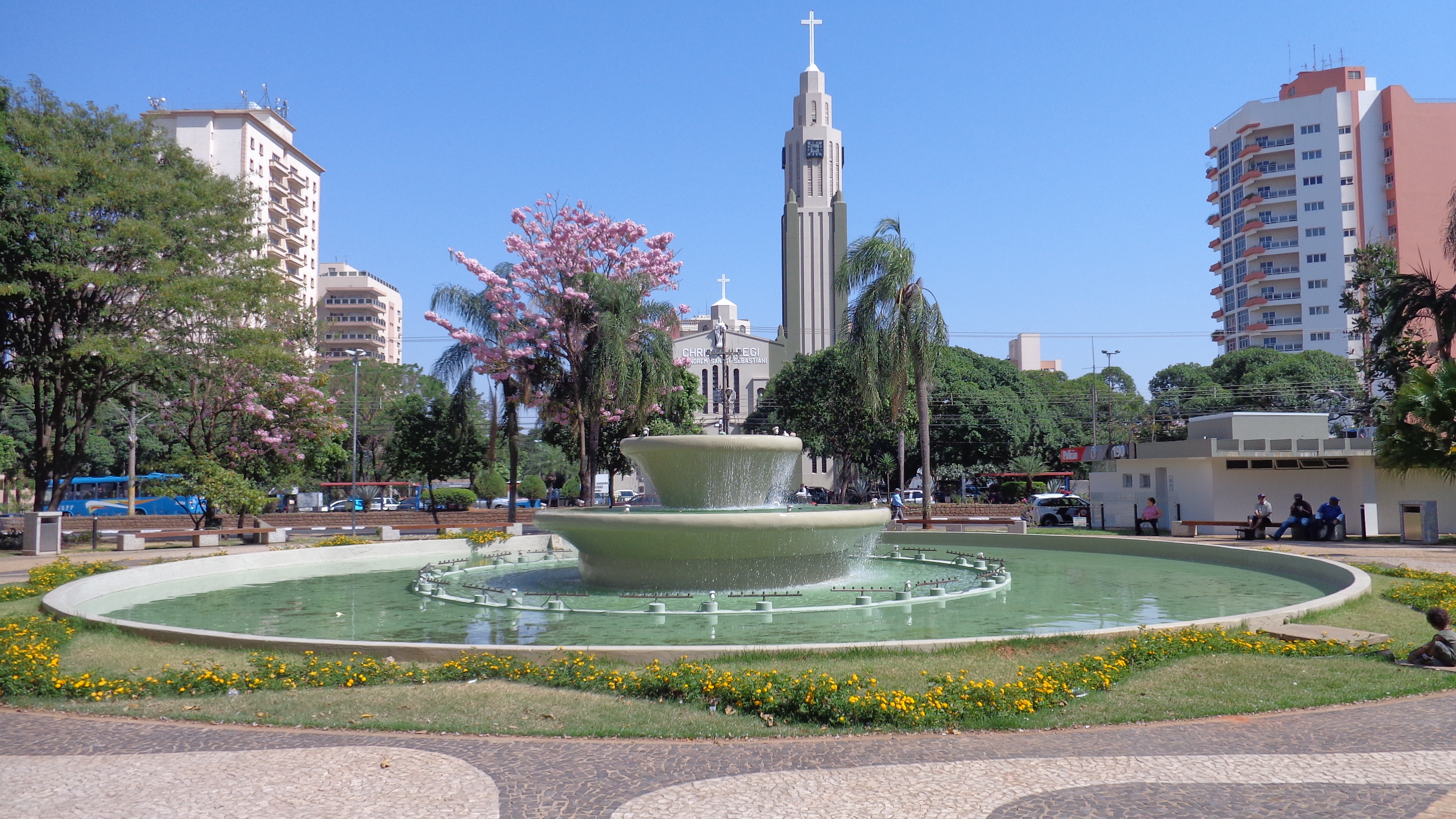
- Cathedral of St. Sebastian

Location
- Country: Brazil
- Ecclesiastical province: Botucatu

Statistics
- Area: 13,251 km^{2} (5,116 sq mi)
- Population: Total; Catholics: (as of 2004); 511,445; 470,000 (91.9%)

Information
- Denomination: Catholic Church
- Sui iuris church: Latin Church
- Rite: Roman Rite
- Established: 16 January 1960 (66 years ago)
- Cathedral: Cathedral of St Sebastian in Presidente Prudente

Current leadership
- Pope: Leo XIV
- Bishop: Benedito Gonçalves dos Santos

The Diocese of Presidente Prudente (Latin: Dioecesis Prudentipolitana) is a Latin Church ecclesiastical territory or diocese of the Catholic Church in Southern Brazil. It is a suffragan diocese in the ecclesiastical province of the metropolitan Archdiocese of Botucatu.

Its cathedra is in the Catedral São Sebastião, dedicated to Saint Sebastian, in the episcopal see of Presidente Prudente.

== History ==
- Established on January 16, 1960, as Diocese of Presidente Prudente, on territory split off from Diocese of Assis.

== Statistics ==
As per 2015, it pastorally served 542,400 Catholics (93.1% of 582,700 total) on 15,513 km^{2} in 53 parishes and 4 missions with 67 priests (55 diocesan, 12 religious), 58 lay religious (22 brothers, 36 sisters) and 17 seminarians .

== Bishops ==
=== Episcopal Ordinaries ===
(all native Brazilians)

Suffragan Bishops of Presidente Prudente

- José de Aquino Pereira (1960.03.26 – 1968.05.06); previously Bishop of Dourados (Brazil) (1958.01.23 – 1960.03.26); next Bishop of Rio Preto (Brazil) (1968.05.06 – retired 1997.02.26), died 2011
- José Gonçalves da Costa, C.SS.R. (later Archbishop) (1969.11.24 – 1975.08.19); previously Titular Bishop of Rhodopolis (1962.06.25 – 1969.11.24) as Auxiliary Bishop of São Sebastião do Rio de Janeiro (Brazil) (1962.06.25 – 1969.11.24), Secretary General of National Conference of Bishops of Brazil (1964 – 1968); later Titular Archbishop of Ulcinj (1975.08.19 – 1979.04.19) as Coadjutor Archbishop of Niterói (Brazil) (1975.08.19 – 1979.04.19), succeeding as Metropolitan Archbishop of Niterói (1979.04.19 – 1990.05.09), died 2001
- Antônio Agostinho Marochi (1976.02.02 – retired 2002.02.20), died 2018; previously Titular Bishop of Thabraca (1973.09.27 – 1976.02.02) as Auxiliary Bishop of Archdiocese of Londrina (Brazil) (1973.09.27 – 1976.02.02)
- José María Libório Camino Saracho (2002.02.20 – retired 2008.04.16); previously Titular Bishop of Urusi (1999.06.16 – 2002.02.20) as Auxiliary Bishop of Diocese of São Miguel Paulista (Brazil) (1999.06.16 – 2002.02.20)
- Benedito Gonçalves dos Santos (2008.04.16 – ...).

=== Other priest of this diocese who became bishop ===
- Maurício Grotto de Camargo, appointed Coadjutor Bishop of Assis, São Paulo in 2000

== Sources and External links ==
- GCatholic.org - data for all sections
- Catholic Hierarchy
- Diocese website (in Portuguese)
