= Mauro Morelli =

Brazilian Roman Catholic prelate (1935–2023)

His Excellency Mauro Morelli
- Bishop Emeritus of Duque de Caxias
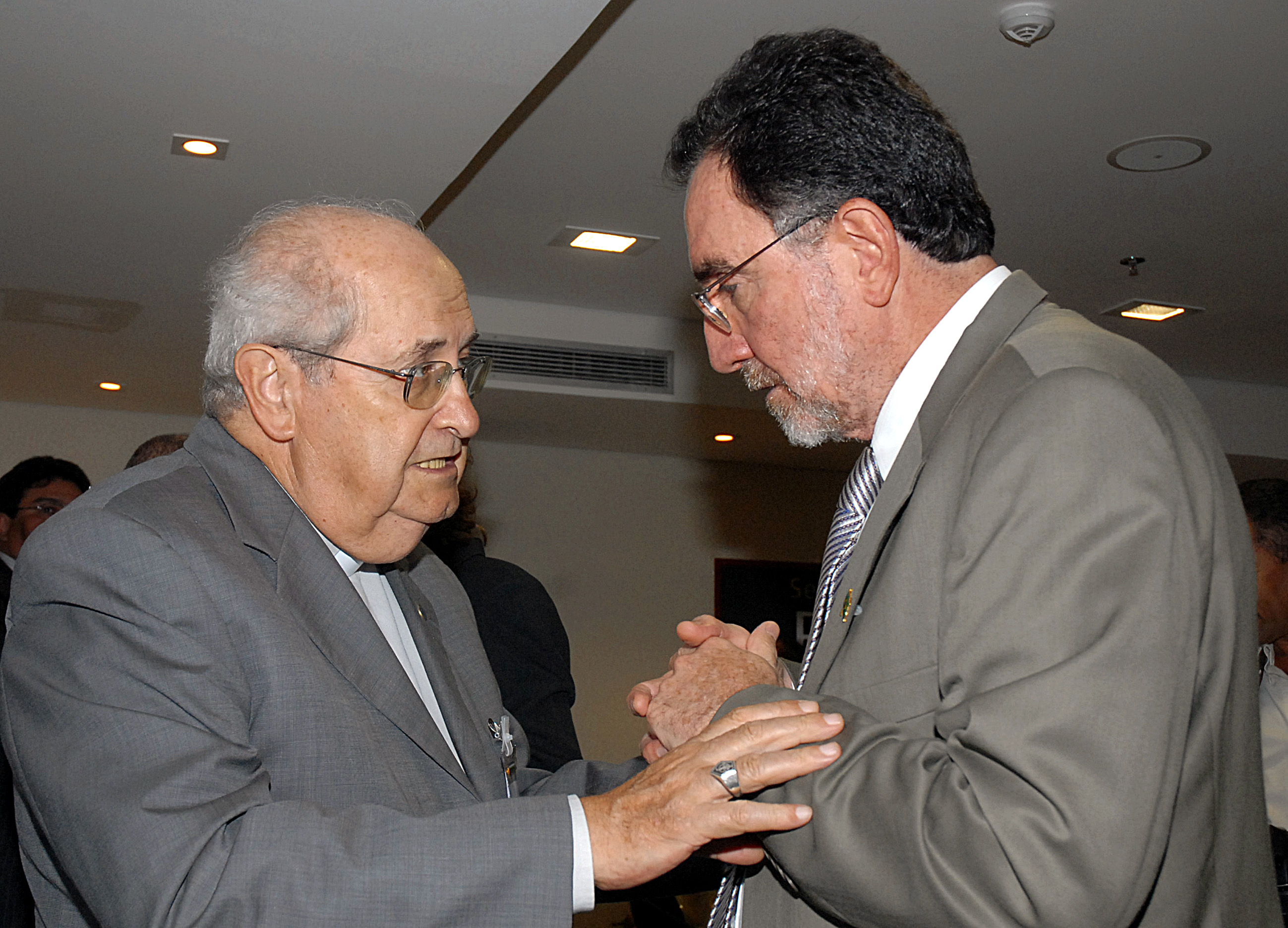
- Morelli (left) with the Minister of Social Development, Patrus Ananias
- Metropolis: São Sebastião do Rio de Janeiro
- Appointed: 25 May 1981
- Term ended: 30 March 2005
- Predecessor: First
- Successor: José Francisco Rezende Dias
- Previous posts: Auxiliary Bishop of São Paulo and Titular Bishop of Vatarba (1975–1981)

Orders
- Ordination: 28 April 1965
- Consecration: 25 January 1975 by Paulo Evaristo Arns

Personal details
- Born: 17 September 1935 Avanhandava, São Paulo, Brazil
- Died: 9 October 2023 (aged 88) Belo Horizonte, Minas Gerais, Brazil

Mauro Morelli (17 September 1935 – 9 October 2023) was a Brazilian Catholic prelate who served as Bishop of Duque de Caxias from 1981 to 2005.

Morelli died on 9 October 2023, at the age of 88.

Catholic Church titles
Preceded by First	Bishop of Duque de Caxias; 1981–2005	Succeeded by José Francisco Rezende Dias
Preceded by Andrzej Wronka	Titular Bishop of Vatarba; 1975–1981	Succeeded by Ricardo Ramírez
Preceded by —	Auxiliary Bishop of São Paulo; 1975–1981	Succeeded by —
