= Antônio de Souza (bishop) =

Brazilian Roman Catholic bishop (born 1929)

The Most Reverend Antônio de Souza CSS
- Bishop Emeritus of Assis
- Church: Catholic Church
- Diocese: Diocese of Assis
- Appointed: 20 July 1977
- Term ended: 27 October 2004
- Predecessor: José Lázaro Neves
- Successor: Maurício Grotto de Camargo

Orders
- Ordination: 1 July 1956
- Consecration: 16 April 1974 by Carmine Rocco

Personal details
- Born: Antônio de Souza; 21 October 1929 (age 96) Bom Jesus dos Perdões, São Paulo, Brazil
- Denomination: Catholic Church
- Education: Pontifical University of Saint Thomas Aquinas
- Motto: In finem dilexit

Antônio de Souza C.S.S. (born 21 October 1929) is a Brazilian Roman Catholic prelate, who served as the Bishop of Assis in the state of São Paulo, Brazil, from 1977 until his retirement in 2004.

== Early life and education ==
Antônio de Souza was born on 21 October 1929 in Bom Jesus dos Perdões, São Paulo, Brazil. He entered the seminary of Rio Claro on 25 February 1944 as a member of the Congregation of the Sacred Stigmata (Stigmatines, CSS). He professed his religious vows in 1951 and completed his philosophical studies in Brazil before pursuing theological studies in Verona and at the Pontifical University of Saint Thomas Aquinas (Angelicum) in Rome, where he obtained a master's degree in Sacred Theology.

== Priesthood ==
Souza was ordained a priest on 1 July 1956 in Verona, Italy, by Archbishop João Urbani. After returning to Brazil in 1957, he served in pastoral ministry and seminary education, acting as a professor of dogmatic theology, Latin, and French, and holding leadership roles in seminaries in the state of São Paulo.

== Episcopal ministry ==
On 13 February 1974, Pope Paul VI appointed Souza as Coadjutor Bishop of Assis. He was consecrated a bishop on 16 April 1974 by Archbishop Carmine Rocco, with Bishops José Lázaro Neves and Hélio Paschoal CSS as co-consecrators.

Following the resignation of Bishop José Lázaro Neves, Souza succeeded as the third Bishop of Assis on 20 July 1977. During his episcopate, he promoted diocesan pastoral planning, oversaw the creation of the Centro Diocesano de Pastoral, supported the expansion of diocesan infrastructure, and contributed to the establishment of the Hospital Regional de Assis.

He submitted his resignation upon reaching the age of retirement, which was accepted on 27 October 2004, after which he assumed the title Bishop emeritus of Assis.

== Later life ==
As Bishop Emeritus, Souza has continued to reside in the Diocese of Assis. In February 2025, at the age of 95, he was hospitalized after being diagnosed with dengue and later discharged to recover at home.

== See also ==
- Roman Catholic Diocese of Assis
- Stigmatines
- Roman Catholic Church in Brazil
