= Atibaia =

Estância de Atibaia
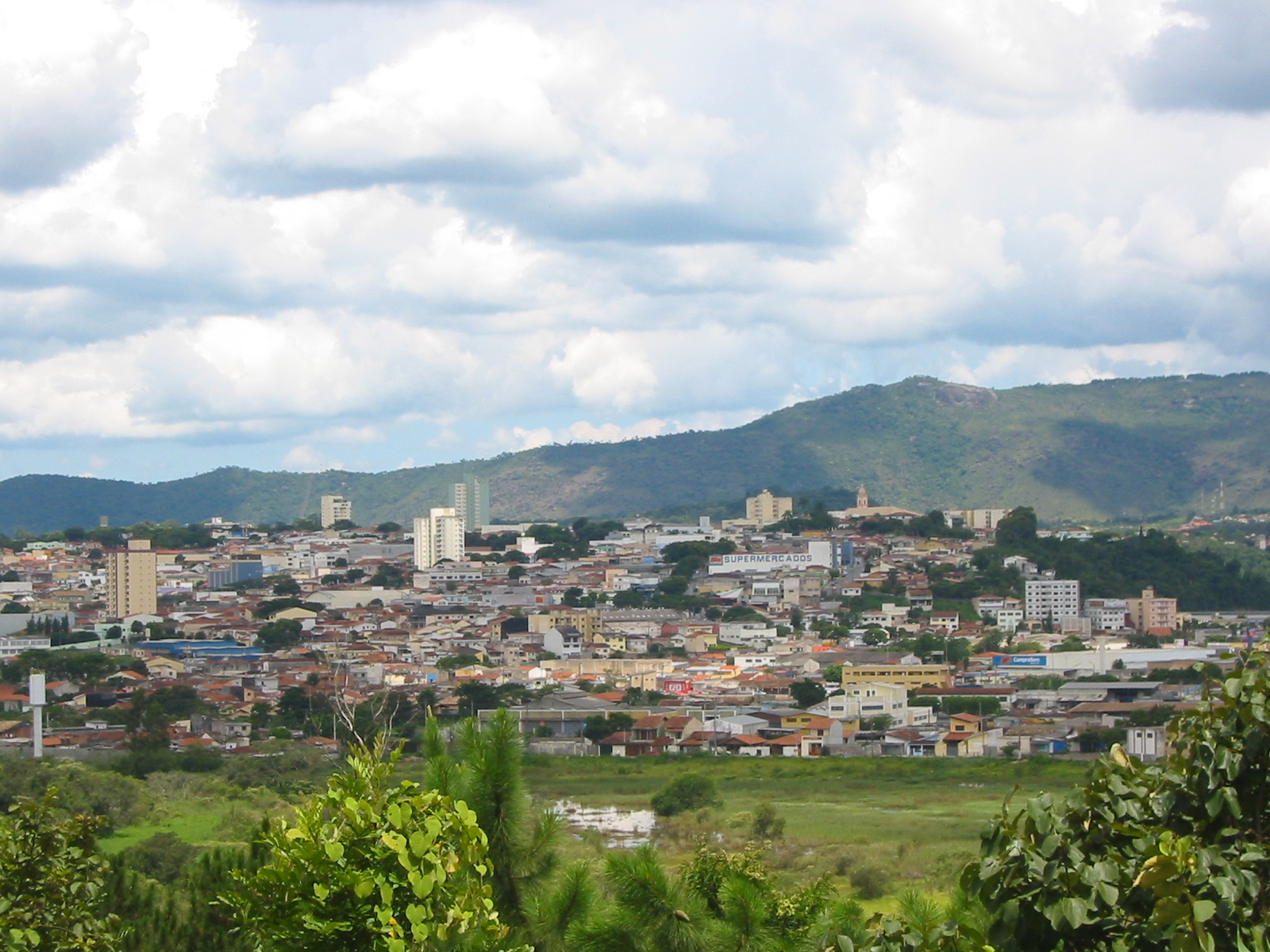
- Central Atibaia

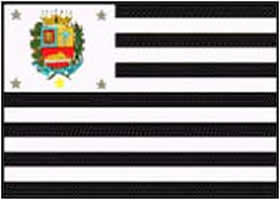
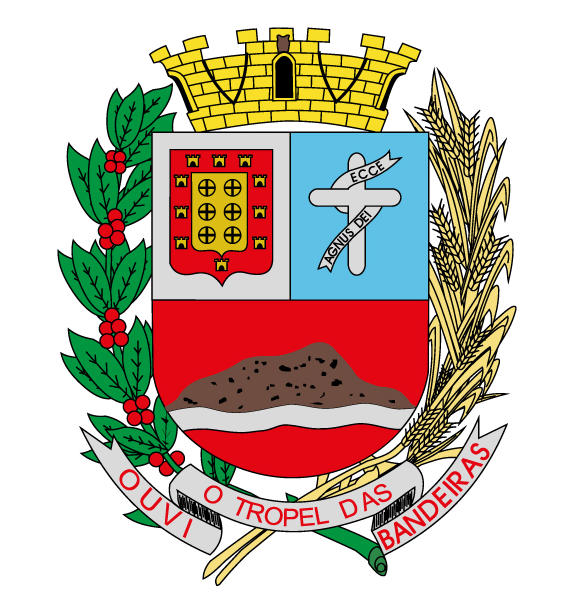
- Flag Coat of arms
- Nickname: Atibaia
- Location of Atibaia

- Location in Brazil
- Coordinates: 23°07′01″S 46°33′01″W
- Country: Brazil
- Region: Southeast
- State: São Paulo
- Founded: June 24, 1665

Area
  - Total: 478.521 km^{2} (184.758 sq mi)
- Elevation: 803 m (2,635 ft)

Population (2022 Census)
  - Total: 158,647
  - Estimate (2025): 167,161
  - Density: 331.536/km^{2} (858.675/sq mi)
- Time zone: UTC−3 (BRT)
- Postal code: 12940-000
- Area code: +55 11
- Website: Atibaia City (in Portuguese)

Atibaia (or Estância de Atibaia) is a Brazilian municipality in the state of São Paulo.

According to the Brazilian statistics institute the IBGE, the city is a conurbation with Bom Jesus dos Perdões forming the largest urban agglomeration in the Bragantina Region with more than 180 thousand inhabitants.

== History ==
In 1665, Jerônimo de Camargo and his expedition found a hill near a river named Tubaia (later called Atibaia River). Jerônimo de Camargo was a Bandeirante explorer.

== Demographics ==
Historical population (municipality)
| Year | Population | %± |
|---|---|---|
| 1920 | 24,674 |
| 1940 | 19,345 | −21.6% |
| 1950 | 18,130 | −6.3% |
| 1960 | 23,380 | 29.0% |
| 1970 | 36,838 | 57.6% |
| 1980 | 57,820 | 57.0% |
| 1991 | 86,336 | 49.3% |
| 2000 | 111,300 | 28.9% |
| 2010 | 126,603 | 13.7% |
| 2022 | 158,647 | 25.3% |

Obs: According to the census of 2007 by the Brazilian Institute of Geography and Statistics (IBGE), Atibaia has approximately 119,166 inhabitants and 65% of the population (95,342 inhabitants) is part of the economically active age group.

== Geography ==
Atibaia is located 64 km north-east of São Paulo and 88 km south-east of Campinas.

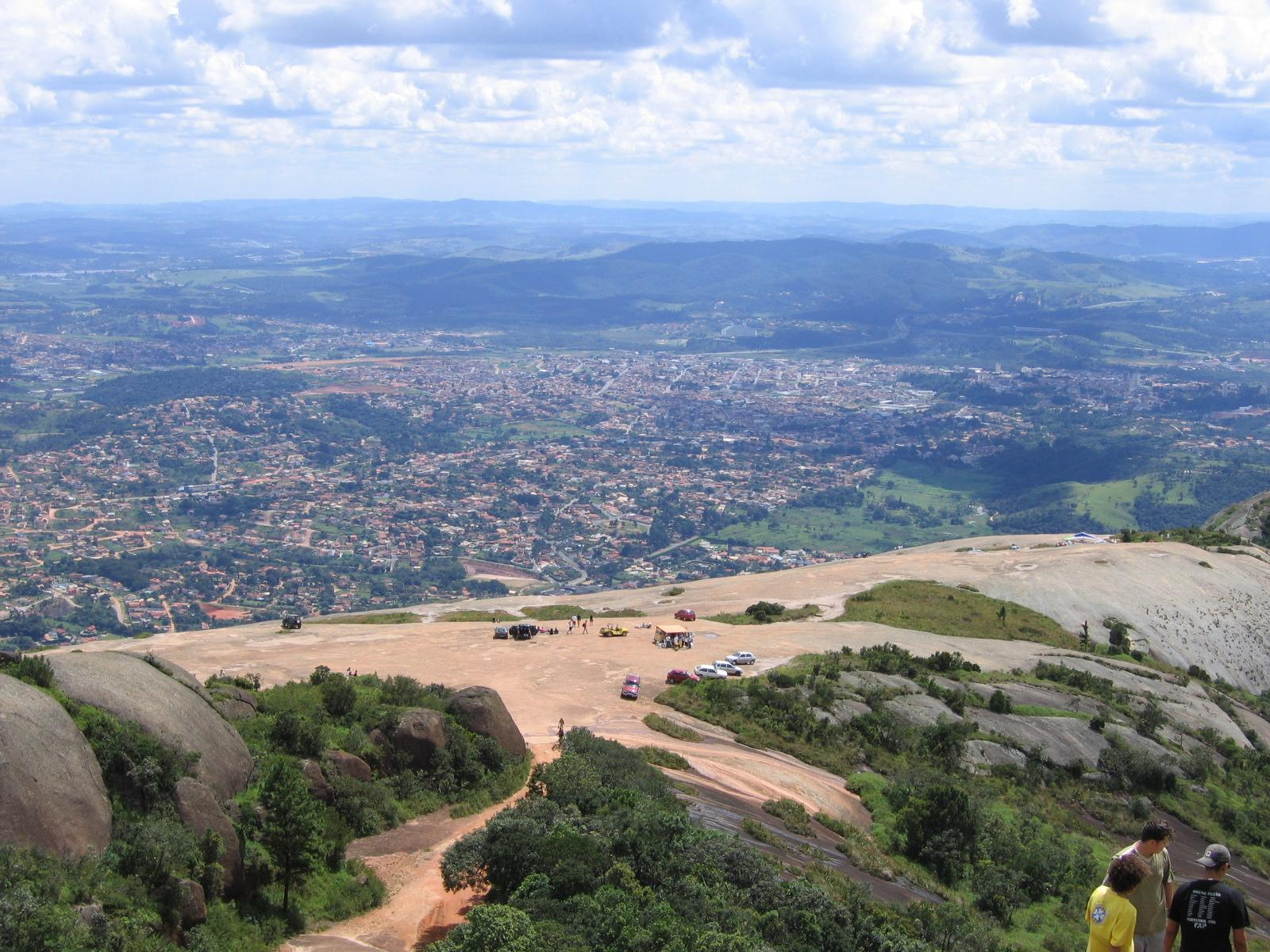
Atibaia, general view from Pedra Grande.

Atibaia has 478 square kilometers of area, 40% of this area is urbanized. The average altitude is 800 meters.

== Economy ==
In 2005, The Brazilian Development Bank (BNDES) loaned Atibaia R$2 million, to try to help it improve its city hall management.

== Sites of interest ==
The Museu João Batista Conti, opened in 1954, contains arms, armor, furniture, historical objects, coins and works of religious art along with documents on the colonial and imperial periods in Brazil.

== Sister cities ==
- Goyang, Gyeonggi Province, South Korea

== See also ==
- List of municipalities in São Paulo
