= Antônio Celso Queiroz =

Brazilian Catholic bishop (1933–2023)

His Excellency Antônio Celso de Queiroz
- Bishop Emeritus of Catanduva
- Archdiocese: Ribeirão Preto
- Appointed: 9 February 2000
- Term ended: 21 October 2009
- Predecessor: Post created
- Successor: Otacílio Luziano Da Silva
- Previous posts: Auxiliary Bishop of São Paulo and Titular Bishop of Saetabis (1975–2000)

Orders
- Ordination: 17 April 1960
- Consecration: 14 December 1975 by Paulo Evaristo Arns

Personal details
- Born: 24 November 1933 Pirassununga, São Paulo, Brazil
- Died: 16 April 2023 (aged 89)
- Denomination: Catholic Church

Antônio Celso Queiroz (24 November 1933 – 16 April 2023) was a Brazilian Catholic prelate and professor. He was auxiliary bishop of the Archdiocese of São Paulo from 1975 to 2000 and bishop of the Diocese Catanduva from 2000 to 2009. He taught at the Pontifical Catholic University of Campinas.

Catholic Church titles
Preceded by Post created	Bishop of Catanduva; 2000–2009	Succeeded by Otacílio Luziano Da Silva
Preceded by László Kádár	Titular Bishop of Saetabis; 1975–2000	Succeeded by Joaquín Mariano Sucunza
Preceded by —	Auxiliary Bishop of São Paulo; 1975–2000	Succeeded by —
