= Joaquim Justino Carreira =

Portuguese-born Brazilian Roman Catholic bishop

- Bishop of Guarulhos
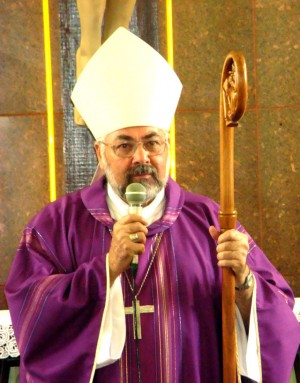
- Joaquim Justino Carreira in 2009
- Church: Catholic Church
- Diocese: Diocese of Guarulhos
- In office: 4 December 1991 – 23 November 2011
- Predecessor: Luiz Gonzaga Bergonzini
- Successor: Edmilson Amador Caetano
- Previous posts: Titular Bishop of Cabarsussi (2005-2011); Auxiliary Bishop of São Paulo (2005-2011)

Orders
- Ordination: 19 March 1977 by Gabriel Paulino Bueno Couto
- Consecration: 21 May 2005 by Cláudio Hummes

Personal details
- Born: 29 January 1950 Santa Catarina da Serra, Leiria District, Portugal
- Died: 1 September 2013 (aged 63) São Paulo, São Paulo, Brazil

Joaquim Justino Carreira (29 January 1950 − 1 September 2013) was a Portuguese-born Brazilian Roman Catholic bishop.

Born in Leiria, Portugal and ordained to the priesthood in 1977, Carreira was named bishop in 2005. In 2011, he was named bishop of the Roman Catholic Diocese of Guarulhos, Brazil. He died while still in office on 1 September 2013, aged 63, in São Paulo.
