= Francisco Manuel Vieira =

Brazilian Roman Catholic bishop

- Bishop of Osasco
- Church: Catholic Church
- Diocese: Diocese of Osasco
- In office: 15 March 1989 – 24 April 2002
- Predecessor: Diocese erected
- Successor: Ercílio Turco
- Previous posts: Titular Bishop of Hippo Diarrhytus (1974-1989); Auxiliary Bishop of São Paulo (1974-1989)

Orders
- Ordination: 8 December 1952
- Consecration: 25 January 1975 by Paulo Evaristo Arns

Personal details
- Born: 29 October 1925 Rio Tinto, Porto District, Portuguese Republic
- Died: 23 December 2013 (aged 88)

Francisco Manuel Vieira (29 October 1925 – 23 December 2013) was a Brazilian Catholic bishop.

Vieira was born in the portuguese town of Rio Tinto (Gondomar) and was ordained in Brazil to the priesthood in 1952. He served as titular bishop of Hippo Diarrhytus and was auxiliary bishop of the Roman Catholic Diocese of São Paulo, Brazil, from 1974 to 1989. He then served as bishop of the Roman Catholic Diocese of Osasco, Brazil from 1989 to 2002.
