= Pan-Amazonian Ecclesial Network =

- Formation: 2014
- Website: redamazonica.org

Pan-Amazonian Ecclesial Network (Red Eclesial Panamazónica, REPAM) is a network of a thousand organizations from the Amazon "to create a development model that privileges the poor and serves the common good".

There are local, national and international instances, congregations, institutions, specialized teams and missionaries from Brazil, Venezuela, French Guiana, Guyana, Suriname, Colombia, Ecuador, Peru and Bolivia that coordinate to work together to protect human rights, indigenous peoples and a different approach to the territory of the Amazon. It was born to be a counterpoint to the states that have prioritized economic growth ahead of human rights violations and the attack on indigenous peoples.

== History ==
At the 2007 Aparecida Conference convened by John Paul II and concretized by Benedict XVI, the bishops warned that the Amazon was "only at the service of the economic interests of transnational corporations." After his election in 2013, Pope Francis addressed the bishops of Brazil to request that the church should assume a new role in the Panamazon region and asked for courage. He said that working for the preservation of nature in that region, especially the most disadvantaged, "is at the heart of the Gospel".

REPAM was established in September 2014 as a common initiative of several groups: the Latin American Bishops' Conference (CELAM), the Confederation of Latin American Religious (CLAR), Caritas Latin America, and the Commission for the Amazon of the Brazilian Bishops' Conference. At the creation of the organization, in September 2014, Cardinal Claudio Hummes said that the Church should have "an Amazonian face", "a mission to become incarnate, inculturated in the indigenous population her, in this particular reality of creation". In 2015 Cardinal Michael Czerny, who was one of the organizers of the Synod for the Amazon, wrote that before REPAM there were "limitations and fragmentations" and with the organization, it was possible "to deal with such a complex reality and changing". Since then, REPAM has coordinated the work of the Catholic Church in the Amazon region, the work of priests, missionaries, representatives of Caritas and has worked to defend indigenous peoples and the environment. In the encyclical Laudato si' of 2015 Pope Francis talked about the need to protect the planet's biodiversity "in the Amazon and the Congo, or the great aquifers and glaciers" because of its importance "for the whole earth and the future of humanity."

REPAM had a fundamental role in the Synod for the Amazon convened by Pope Francis in 2017 and that took place from 5 to 29 October 2019 in Rome with the aim of "find new paths for the evangelization of that portion of the people of God, particularly the indigenous people who are often forgotten and often face a bleak future due to the crisis of the Amazon rainforest, a fundamental lung for our planet." The president and general rapporteur was Claudio Hummes and vice-president Pedro Barreto. The organization positively valued the Synod in considering that "a woman’s voice, intercultural, and courageous dedication for life to the last consequences, although we still have a long way to go as a Church to give the deserved space to these voices".
