= Cláudio Hummes =

Brazilian Catholic prelate (1934–2022)

His Eminence Cláudio Hummes OFM
- Prefect Emeritus of the Congregation for the Clergy
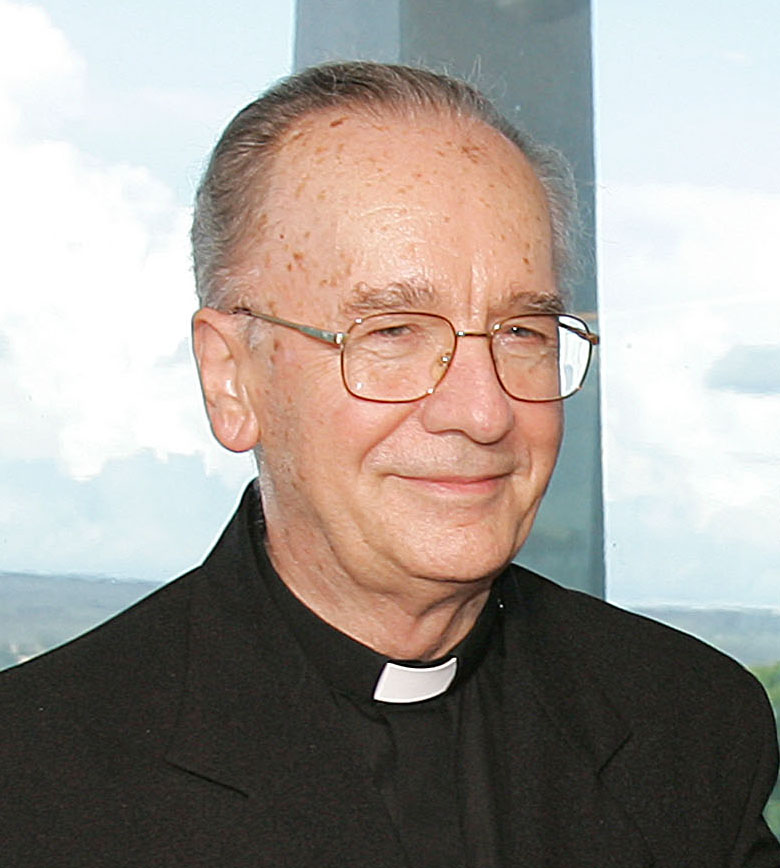
- See: São Paulo
- Appointed: 31 October 2006
- Term ended: 7 October 2010
- Predecessor: Darío Castrillón Hoyos
- Successor: Mauro Piacenza
- Other post: Cardinal-Priest of S. Antonio da Padova in Via Merulana
- Previous posts: Coadjutor Bishop of Santo André (1975); Titular Bishop of Carcabia (1975); Bishop of Santo André (1975–1996); Archbishop of Fortaleza (1996–1998); Archbishop of São Paulo (1998–2006)

Orders
- Ordination: 3 August 1958 by João Resende Costa
- Consecration: 25 May 1975 by Aloísio Leo Arlindo Lorscheider
- Created cardinal: 21 February 2001 by Pope John Paul II
- Rank: Cardinal-Priest

Personal details
- Born: Auri Alfonso Hummes; 8 August 1934 Montenegro, Rio Grande do Sul, Brazil
- Died: 4 July 2022 (aged 87) São Paulo, Brazil
- Denomination: Roman Catholic
- Motto: Omnes Vos Fratres (We are all brothers)
- Coat of arms

Cláudio Hummes OFM (Brazilian Portuguese pronunciation: [ˈklawdʒu ˈʁum(i)s]; born Auri Alfonso Hummes; 8 August 1934 – 4 July 2022) was a Brazilian prelate of the Catholic Church. He was prefect of the Congregation for the Clergy from 2006 to 2010, having served as Archbishop of Fortaleza from 1996 to 1998 and Archbishop of São Paulo from 1998 to 2006. A member of the Order of Friars Minor and an outspoken proponent of social justice, he was made a cardinal in 2001.

== Biography ==
=== Early life and education ===
Hummes was born Auri Alfonso Hummes in the city of Montenegro to Pedro Adão Hummes, a German-Brazilian, and Maria Frank, a German. Taking the name Cláudio upon his profession as a Franciscan, he was ordained to the priesthood on 3 August 1958 by Archbishop João Resende Costa. He obtained a doctorate in philosophy in 1963 from the Pontifical University Antonianum in Rome.

From 1963 until 1968, he taught philosophy at the Franciscan seminary in Garibaldi, the major seminary of Viamão, and at the Pontifical Catholic University of Porto Alegre. He then studied at the Ecumenical Institute of Bossey in Geneva, Switzerland, where he received a specialization in ecumenism. He was adviser for ecumenical affairs to the Episcopal Conference of Brazil, Provincial Superior of the Franciscans of Rio Grande do Sul (1972–1975), and president of the Union of Latin American Conferences of Franciscans.

Along with his native Portuguese he speaks Riograndenser Hunsrückisch, a regional German dialect of south.

=== Bishop ===
On 22 March 1975, he was appointed Coadjutor Bishop of Santo André and Titular Bishop of Carcabia. Hummes received his episcopal consecration on the following 25 May from Archbishop Aloísio Lorscheider, OFM, with Bishops Mauro Morelli and Urbano Allgayer serving as co-consecrators. He succeeded Jorge de Oliveira as Bishop of Santo André on 29 December of that same year. Hummes allowed the labour unions to meet in parishes throughout his diocese, going against the dictatorship in Brazil at the time. It was here that he began his support for liberation theology, and forged his friendship with the union boss at the time, Luiz Inácio Lula da Silva. On 29 May 1996 he was promoted to Archbishop of Fortaleza and was then transferred to São Paulo on 15 April 1998.

Styles of Cláudio Hummes
- Reference style: His Eminence
- Spoken style: Your Eminence
- Religious style: Monsignor
- Informal style: Cardinal
- See: São Paulo (Emeritus)

==== Cardinal ====
Hummes was created Cardinal-Priest of S. Antonio da Padova in Via Merulana by Pope John Paul II in the consistory of 21 February 2001. He later preached the Lenten spiritual exercises for John Paul II and the Roman Curia in 2002. One of the cardinal electors who participated in the 2005 papal conclave that selected Pope Benedict XVI, Hummes was often mentioned as a possible successor to Pope John Paul II.

Hummes was a member of Congregation for Divine Worship and the Discipline of the Sacraments, Congregation for the Doctrine of the Faith, Congregation for Bishops, Congregation for Catholic Education, Pontifical Council for the Laity, Pontifical Council for the Family, Pontifical Council Cor Unum, Pontifical Council for Interreligious Dialogue, Pontifical Council for Culture, Pontifical Commission for Latin America, X Ordinary Council of the General Secretariat of the Synod of Bishops, Council of Cardinals for the Study of Organizational, and Prefecture for the Economic Affairs of the Holy See.

On 31 October 2006, Pope Benedict XVI appointed Hummes to head the Congregation for the Clergy. He accepted his resignation from that post on 7 October 2010.

In 2013 he served as one of the 115 cardinals in the conclave that elected Pope Francis. When the new pope won the conclave ballot, Hummes whispered to him, "Don't forget the poor". Francis said that immediately he remembered Francis of Assisi, "the man of poverty, the man of peace, the man who loves and protects creation," and "the name Francis came into my heart". When Francis appeared on the balcony shortly after his election, Hummes was among the cardinals who accompanied the new pope and stood beside him at his immediate left on the balcony.

A year later, Hummes was appointed honorary president of the Pan-Amazonian Ecclesial Network (REPAM), established in 2014 in Brasilia, Brazil, during a meeting of bishops whose territories include Amazon regions, priests, missionaries of congregations who work in the Amazon jungle, and national representatives of Caritas and laypeople belonging to various Church bodies. In his message, he reiterated that the creation of the Pan-Amazon Ecclesial Network "represents a new incentive and relaunch of the work of the Church in Amazonia, strongly desired by the Holy Father. There, the Church wishes to be, with courage and determination, a missionary Church, merciful, prophetic, and close to all the people, especially the poorest, the excluded, the discarded, the forgotten and wounded. A Church with an 'Amazonian face' and a 'native clergy', as Pope Francis proposed in his address to the bishops of Brazil".

=== Death ===
Hummes died at his home in São Paulo on 4 July 2022 following a bout of lung cancer. He was 87.

== Climate activism ==
On 29 November 2015, ahead of the 2015 United Nations Climate Change Conference Cardinal Hummes appeared again on the world's global media stage when he and Avaaz campaigner Oscar Soria displayed a pair of shoes donated by Pope Francis to support a climate demonstration in Paris that had replaced a planned march after French authorities had banned public protests in the aftermath of the November 2015 Paris attacks. Parisians and others from around the world donated shoes and set them up at Place de la Republique, in a symbolic march organized by the civic movement Avaaz which gained the support of the pope.

"This is a very important and also very emotional moment, the Pope wanted to personally participate symbolically just like all of us who have put our shoes, we want to participate symbolically to the worldwide march for climate change here in Paris", Cardinal Hummes told journalists at the event.

"We ask for drastic cuts of carbon emissions to keep the global temperature rise below the dangerous threshold of 1.5 °C," the cardinal said before international media. "As the bishops' appeal states, we need to 'put an end to the fossil fuel era' and 'set a goal for complete decarbonisation by 2050 (...) And we ask wealthier countries to aid the world's poorest to cope with climate change impacts, by providing robust climate finance," he added.

Recounting that event, Cardinal Hummes later said: "I had the privilege, along with Oscar Soria from Avaaz, to bring the shoes of Pope Francis. There were lots of expectations, it was a great and symbolically strong way of pressure from the people, and as well the presence of Pope Francis, in this clamor to avert climate change".

== Views ==
=== Economic issues ===
Cardinal Hummes who criticized the spread of global capitalism, claimed that privatizing state companies and lowering tariffs had contributed to "misery and poverty affecting millions around the world".

=== Indigenous people ===
Hummes issued an official statement condemning the anonymous attacks on homeless indigenous people. He said "such violence and cruelty is unacceptable and should be vigorously repudiated. The Church has cried out many times regarding the need to come to the aid of those who are forced to live in our streets, without shelter. She does so out of a duty of humanity and because of her faith in Jesus Christ, who wishes to be identified in each person, especially in the poor and handicapped".

=== Clerical celibacy ===
In a 2006 interview with Brazilian newspaper O Estado de S. Paulo, Cardinal Hummes said that "even though celibacy is part of Catholic history and culture, the Church could review this question, because celibacy is not a dogma but a disciplinary question." He also said that it is "a long and valuable tradition in the Latin-rite church, based on strong theological and pastoral arguments".

=== Contraception ===
Hummes reprimanded priests who attack Catholic teachings about condoms.

== Published works ==
- —; Betto, Frei; Martins, Jose S. (1984). Desemprego Causas e Consequencias [Unemployment: Causes and Consequences]. ASIN B0042PLRTM.
- — (1964). Renovação das provas tradicionais da existência de Deus por Maurice Blondel em L'Action (1893) [Renewal of the traditional proof of the existence of God by Maurice Blondel in L'Action (1893)]. Pontificio Ateneo Antoniano Roma. Facoltà Filosofica: Tesi di laurea (in Brazilian Portuguese). Tip. Editorial Franciscana.
- — (2002). Sempre discepoli di Cristo: esercizi spirituali predicati a Giovanni Paolo II e alla Curia romana [Always disciples of Christ: Spiritual exercises preached to John Paul II and the Roman Curia]. Dimensioni dello spirito (in Italian). San Paolo Edizioni. ISBN 978-88-215-4731-7.
- — (2005). Diálogo com a cidade [Dialogue with the city] (in Brazilian Portuguese). São Paulo, Brasil: Paulus. ISBN 978-85-349-2365-1. OCLC 64626864.
- — (2006). "Theological and Ecclesiological Foundations of Gaudium et Spes". Journal of Catholic Social Thought. 3 (2). Philosophy Documentation Center: 231–242. doi:10.5840/jcathsoc20063220. ISSN 1548-0712.
- — (2006). Discípulos E Missionários De Jesus Cristo [Disciples and Missionaries of Jesus Christ] (in Brazilian Portuguese). Paulus. ISBN 9788534925662.
- —; Piacenza, M. (2011). The Missionary Identity of the Priest in the Church as an Intrinsic Dimension of the Tria Munera: Circular Letter. Congregatio pro Clericis. Libreria Editrice Vaticana. ISBN 978-88-209-8468-7.
- — (2015). Papa Francisco e Apóstolo Paulo. Lâmpadas no Caminho [Pope Francis and the Apostle Paul: Lamps on the Way] (in Brazilian Portuguese). Paulus. ISBN 9788534941723.
- — (2017). Grandes metas do Papa Francisco [Great goals of Pope Francis]. Coleção Comunidade e Missão (in Brazilian Portuguese). Paulus Editora. ISBN 978-85-349-4523-3.
- Damasceno, Raymundo; Hummes, Cláudio (2017). Nossa Senhora Aparecida e o Papa Francisco : dois cardeais conversam sobre o papa e a devoção pela padroeira do Brasil [Our Lady of Aparecida and Pope Francis: Two cardinals talk about the pope and devotion to the patron saint of Brazil] (in Brazilian Portuguese). São Paulo, SP: Planeta. ISBN 978-85-422-0938-9. OCLC 1090303420. ISBN 978-85-422-1151-1
- — (2018). Ano Santo da Misericórdia: um Jubileu Extraordinário [Holy Year of Mercy: an Extraordinary Jubilee] (in Brazilian Portuguese). Paulus. ISBN 978-8534942744.
- — (2019). O Sínodo para a Amazônia [The Synod for the Amazon]. Comunidade e missão (in Brazilian Portuguese). Paulus Editora. ISBN 978-85-349-5040-4. ISBN 9788534949002
- — (2019). Il Sinodo per l'Amazzonia. Nuovi cammini per la Chiesa e per una ecologia integrale [The Synod for the Amazon: New paths for the Church and for an integral ecology]. Nuovi fermenti (in Italian). San Paolo Edizioni. ISBN 978-88-922-1918-2.

Catholic Church titles
Preceded by José Lafayette Ferreira Álvares	— TITULAR — Titular Bishop of Carcabia; 22 March 1975 – 29 December 1975	Succeeded by Vittorio Luigi Mondello
Preceded by Jorge Marcos de Oliveira	Bishop of Santo André; 29 December 1975 – 29 May 1996	Succeeded by Décio Pereira
Preceded by Aloísio Lorscheider	Archbishop of Fortaleza; 29 May 1996 – 15 April 1998	Succeeded by José Antônio Aparecido Tosi Marques
Preceded by Paulo Evaristo Arns	Archbishop of São Paulo; 15 April 1998 – 31 October 2006	Succeeded by Odilo Scherer
Preceded by António Ribeiro	Cardinal-Priest of Sant'Antonio da Padova in Via Merulana; 21 February 2001 – 4 July 2022	Succeeded by Américo Aguiar
Preceded by Darío Castrillón Hoyos	Prefect for the Congregation for the Clergy; 31 October 2006 – 7 October 2010	Succeeded by Mauro Piacenza
Preceded by Darío Castrillón Hoyos	President for the International Council for Catechesis; 31 October 2006 – 7 October 2010	Succeeded by Mauro Piacenza
