= Diocese of Duque de Caxias =

Catholic ecclesiastical territory

Coordinates: 22.7859°S 43.3109°W

Diocese of Duque de Caxias Dioecesis Caxiensis

Catholic

Location
- Country: Brazil
- Ecclesiastical province: São Sebastião do Rio de Janeiro

Statistics
- Area: 511 km^{2} (197 sq mi)
- Population: Total; Catholics: (as of 2004); 1,235,626; 976,000 (79.0%)

Information
- Rite: Latin Rite
- Established: 11 October 1980 (46 years ago)
- Cathedral: Catedral Santo Antônio

Current leadership
- Pope: Leo XIV
- Bishop: Tarcísio Nascentes dos Santos
- Metropolitan Archbishop: Orani João Tempesta, O. Cist.

The Roman Catholic Diocese of Duque de Caxias (Latin: Dioecesis Caxiensis) is a diocese located in the city of Duque de Caxias in the ecclesiastical province of São Sebastião do Rio de Janeiro in Brazil.

== History ==
- 11 October 1980: Established as Diocese of Duque de Caxias from the Diocese of Nova Iguaçu and Diocese of Petrópolis

== Leadership ==
- Bishops of Duque de Caxias (Latin Rite)
  - Mauro Morelli (1981.05.25 – 2005.03.30)
  - José Francisco Rezende Dias (2005.03.30 – 2011.11.30), appointed Archbishop of Niterói, Rio de Janeiro
  - Tarcísio Nascentes dos Santos (since 2012.08.01)
