= Agnelo Rossi =

Brazilian cardinal (1913–1995)

His Eminence Agnelo Rossi
- Dean of the College of Cardinals
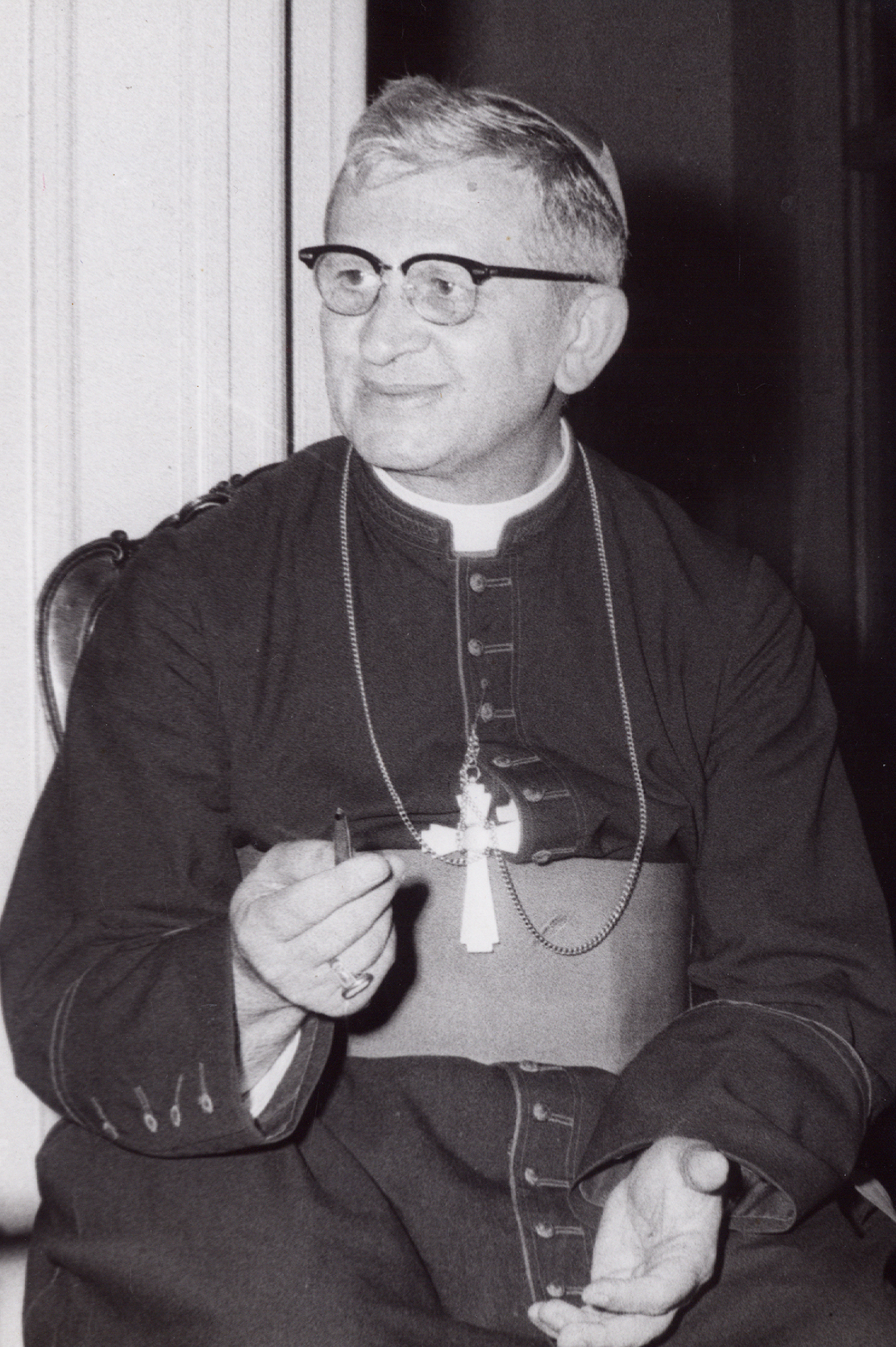
- Rossi in 1967
- Church: Roman Catholic
- Appointed: 19 December 1986
- Term ended: 31 May 1993
- Predecessor: Carlo Confalonieri
- Successor: Bernardin Gantin
- Other post: Cardinal-Bishop of Sabina-Poggio Mirteto (1984–95)
- Previous posts: Bishop of Barra do Piraí (1956–62); Archbishop of Ribeirão Preto (1962–64); President of the Brazilian Bishops' Conference (1964–70); Archbishop of São Paulo (1964–70); Cardinal-Priest of Gran Madre di Dio (1965–84); Prefect of the Congregation for the Propagation of the Faith (1970–84); Camerlengo of the College of Cardinals (1976–77); President of the Administration of the Patrimony of the Apostolic See (1984–89); Cardinal-Bishop of Ostia (1986–93)

Orders
- Ordination: 27 March 1937 by Luigi Traglia
- Consecration: 15 April 1956 by Paulo de Tarso Campos
- Created cardinal: 22 February 1965 by Pope Paul VI
- Rank: Cardinal-Priest (1965–84); Cardinal-Bishop (1984–95)

Personal details
- Born: Aniello Rossi; 4 May 1913 Campinas, Brazil
- Died: 21 May 1995 (aged 82) Indaiatuba, Brazil
- Education: Pontifical Gregorian University
- Motto: Oportet illum regnare
- Coat of arms

Styles of Agnelo Rossi
- Reference style: His Eminence
- Spoken style: Your Eminence
- Informal style: Cardinal
- See: Sabina e Poggio Mirteto (suburbicarian), Ostia (suburbicarian)

Agnelo Rossi (born Aniello Rossi; 4 May 1913 – 21 May 1995) was a Brazilian cardinal of the Roman Catholic Church. He served as dean of the Sacred College of Cardinals from 1986 until 1993.

== Biography ==
Aniello (later changed to "Agnelo") Rossi was born on 4 May 1913 in Joaquim Egidio, in the municipality of Campinas. Both his parents, Vincenzo Rossi e Vittoria Colombo, were Italian immigrants from the village of Lagonegro.

In 1933 he left his Brazilian home for Rome. There he studied at the Pontifical College Pio Brasileiro and the Pontifical Gregorian University. He was ordained a priest on 27 March 1937 in the Patriarchal Lateran Basilica by Luigi Traglia, Vicegerent of Rome.

Rossi subsequently met duties in Brazil, as secretary to the Bishop of Campinas for one year and as faculty member of the Central Seminary of São Paulo and the faculty of economic science of the University of Campinas. He was canon of the cathedral chapter of Campinas in 1943–1956.

In 1956 Rossi was appointed Bishop of Barra do Piraí within the metropolitan district of Rio de Janeiro. Paulo de Tarso Campos, bishop of his home diocese Campinas, consecrated him in the same year. Rossi was named Archbishop of Ribeirão Preto in 1962. Two years later he was transferred to the Archiepiscopal see of São Paulo, which he held until 1970.

In the consistory of 1965 Rossi was created Cardinal-Priest by Pope Paul VI, and he received the title of Gran Madre di Dio. In 1970 he was appointed Prefect of the Sacred Congregation for the Evangelization of Peoples, the recently renamed Sacra Congregatio de Propaganda Fide. He participated in the two conclaves of 1978 (I, II).

The Congregation for the Evangelization of People's 1978 Faculties and Privileges Granted to Clergy and Catholics Living in Mainland China in These Grave Circumstances was issued during Rossi's tenure. To address a lack of priests and bishops in China whom the Vatican deemed legitimate, the document relaxed various requirements regarding the administration of the sacraments, the ordination of priests, and how priests could perform their duties.

In 1984 he was promoted to Cardinal Bishop of Sabina e Poggio Morteto by Pope John Paul II; two years later he received the title of Bishop of Ostia in addition, becoming Dean of the College of Cardinals. He was President of the Administration of the Patrimony of the Holy See from 1984 to 1989.

He stepped down as president in 1989 and as Dean in 1993; because he ceased to be Dean, he gave up the title of Bishop of Ostia. He subsequently returned to Brazil. Cardinal Rossi died on 21 May 1995 in Campinas.

== See also ==
- Archiepiscopal see

== Sources ==
- Catholic Hierarchy
- Cardinals of the Holy Roman Church

Catholic Church titles
Preceded by Carlo Confalonieri	Dean of the College of Cardinals; 19 December 1986 – 31 May 1993	Succeeded by Bernardin Gantin
Preceded by Rosalio José Castillo Lara	President of the Administration of the Patrimony of the Apostolic See; 8 April 1984 – 6 December 1989	Succeeded by Rosalio José Castillo Lara
Preceded by Grégoire-Pierre Agagianian as Prefect	Prefect for the Congregation for the Evangelization of Peoples; 22 October 1970 – 8 April 1984	Succeeded by Dermot Ryan as Pro-Prefect
Preceded by Carlos Carmelo Vasconcellos Motta	Archbishop of São Paulo; 1 November 1964 – 22 October 1970	Succeeded by Paulo Evaristo Arns
Preceded by Luis do Amaral Mousinho	Archbishop of Ribeirão Preto; 6 September 1962 – 1 November 1964	Succeeded by Felix da Cunha Vasconcellos
Preceded by José André Coimbra	Bishop of Barra do Piraí-Volta Redonda; 5 March 1956 – 6 September 1962	Succeeded by Altivo Pacheco Ribeiro
