= Antônio Agostinho Marochi =

Brazilian Roman Catholic bishop (1925–2018)

- Bishop of Presidente Prudente
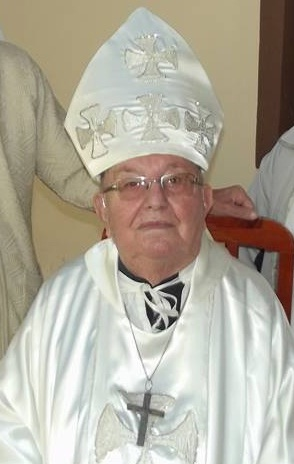
- Church: Catholic Church
- Diocese: Diocese of Presidente Prudente
- In office: 2 February 1976 – 20 February 2002
- Predecessor: José Gonçalves da Costa
- Successor: José María Libório Camino Saracho
- Previous posts: Titular Bishop of Thabraca (1973-1976); Auxiliary Bishop of Londrina (1973-1976)

Orders
- Ordination: 6 December 1953 by Manuel da Silveira d'Elboux
- Consecration: 6 December 1973 by Pedro Antônio Marchetti Fedalto

Personal details
- Born: 28 August 1925 Campo Largo, Paraná, United States of Brazil
- Died: 28 January 2018 (aged 92) Presidente Prudente, São Paulo, Brazil

Antônio Agostinho Marochi (28 August 1925 – 28 January 2018) was a Catholic bishop.

Marochi was ordained to the priesthood in 1953. He served as auxiliary bishop of the Archdiocese of Londrina, Brazil from 1973 to 1976. He then served as bishop of the Roman Catholic Diocese of Presidente Prudente, Brazil from 1976 to 2002.
