= Diocese of Santo André =

Catholic ecclesiastical territory

Diocese of Santo André Dioecesis Sancti Andreae in Brasilia

Catholic
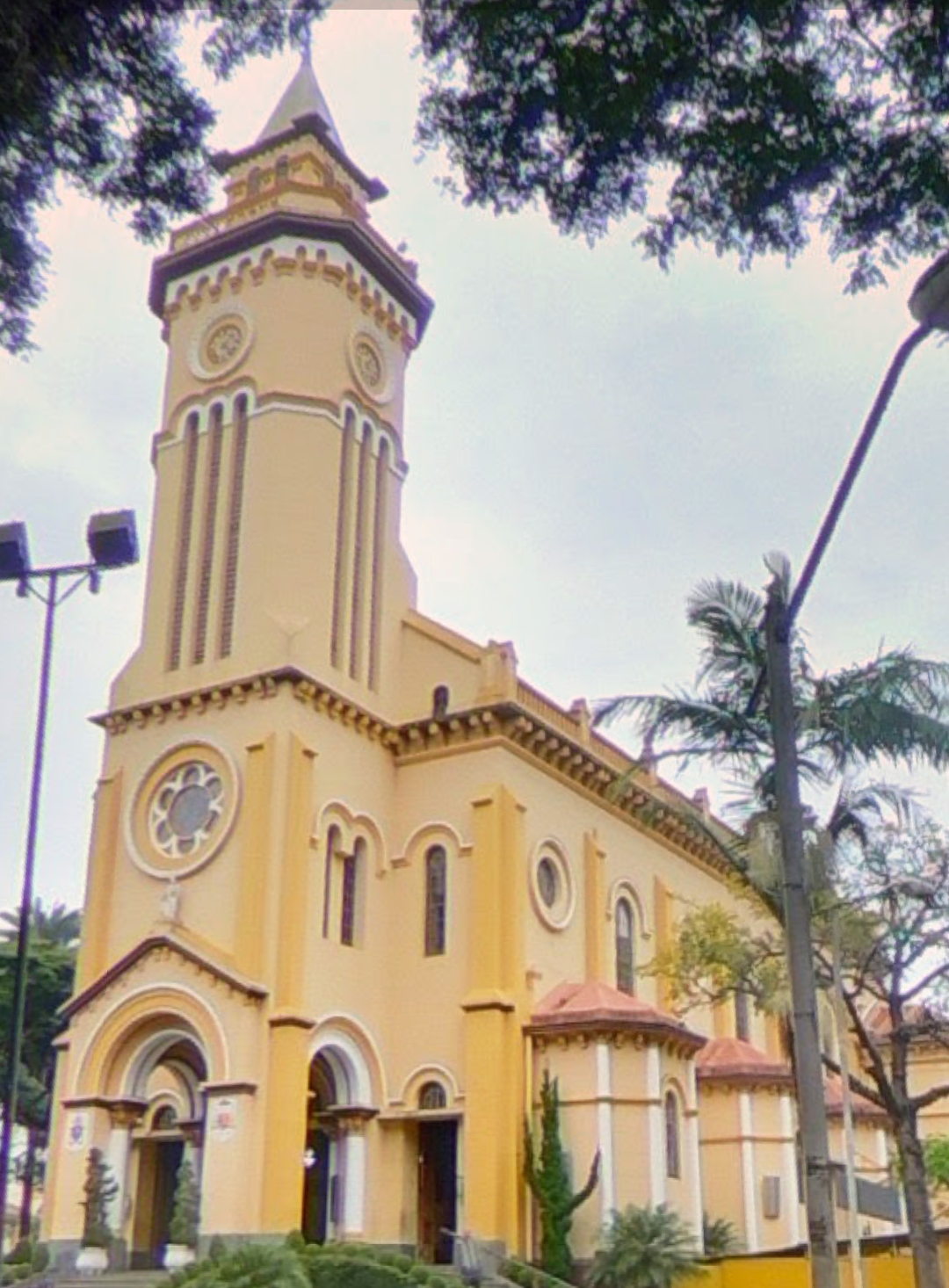
- Catedral Nossa Senhora do Carmo in 2020

Location
- Country: Brazil
- Ecclesiastical province: São Paulo

Statistics
- Area: 720 km^{2} (280 sq mi)
- Population: Total; Catholics: (as of 2004); 2,354,722; 2,102,100 (89.3%)

Information
- Rite: Latin Rite
- Established: 18 July 1954 (72 years ago)
- Cathedral: Catedral Nossa Senhora do Carmo

Current leadership
- Pope: Leo XIV
- Bishop: Pedro Carlos Cipolini
- Metropolitan Archbishop: Odilo Scherer
- Bishops emeritus: José Nelson Westrupp, S.C.I.

Map
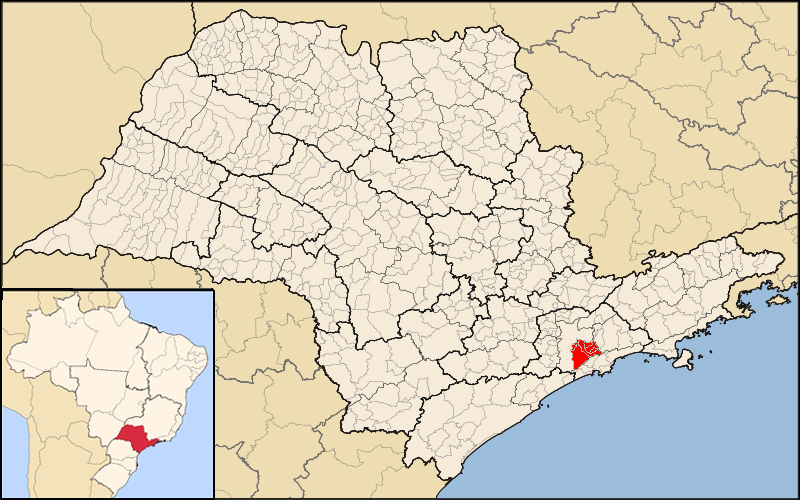

Website
- www.diocesesantoandre.org.br

The Roman Catholic Diocese of Santo André (Latin: Dioecesis Sancti Andreae in Brasilia) is a diocese located in the city of Santo André, in the ecclesiastical province of São Paulo in Brazil.

== History ==
- 18 July 1954: Established as Diocese of Santo André from Metropolitan Archdiocese of São Paulo

== Bishops ==
- Bishops of Santo André (Roman Rite), in reverse chronological order
  - Bishop Pedro Carlos Cipolini (2015.05.27 - present)
  - Bishop José Nelson Westrupp, S.C.I. (2003.10.01 – 2015.05.27)
  - Bishop Décio Pereira (1997.05.21 – 2003.02.05)
  - Bishop Cláudio Hummes, O.F.M. (1975.12.29 – 1996.05.29), appointed Archbishop of Fortaleza, Ceara; future Cardinal
  - Bishop Jorge Marcos de Oliveira (1954.07.26 – 1975.12.29)

=== Coadjutor bishop ===
- Cláudio Aury Affonso Hummes, O.F.M. (1975); future Cardinal

=== Auxiliary bishop ===
- Airton José dos Santos (2001-2004), appointed Bishop of Mogi das Cruzes, São Paulo

=== Other priest of this diocese who became bishop ===
- Manuel Parrado Carral, appointed Auxiliary Bishop of São Paulo in 2001
