= José Benedito Simão =

Brazilian Roman Catholic bishop

José Benedito Simão (1 January 1951 – 27 November 2015) was a Brazilian Roman Catholic bishop and professor.

Ordained to the priesthood in 1981, Simão was named auxiliary bishop of the Roman Catholic Archdiocese of São Paulo, Brazil in 2001. In 2009, he was named bishop of the Roman Catholic Diocese of Assis, Brazil and died while still in office. He taught theology at the Pontifical Catholic University of São Paulo.
