= Diocese of Guarulhos =

Catholic ecclesiastical territory

Diocese of Guarulhos Dioecesis Guaruliensis

Catholic
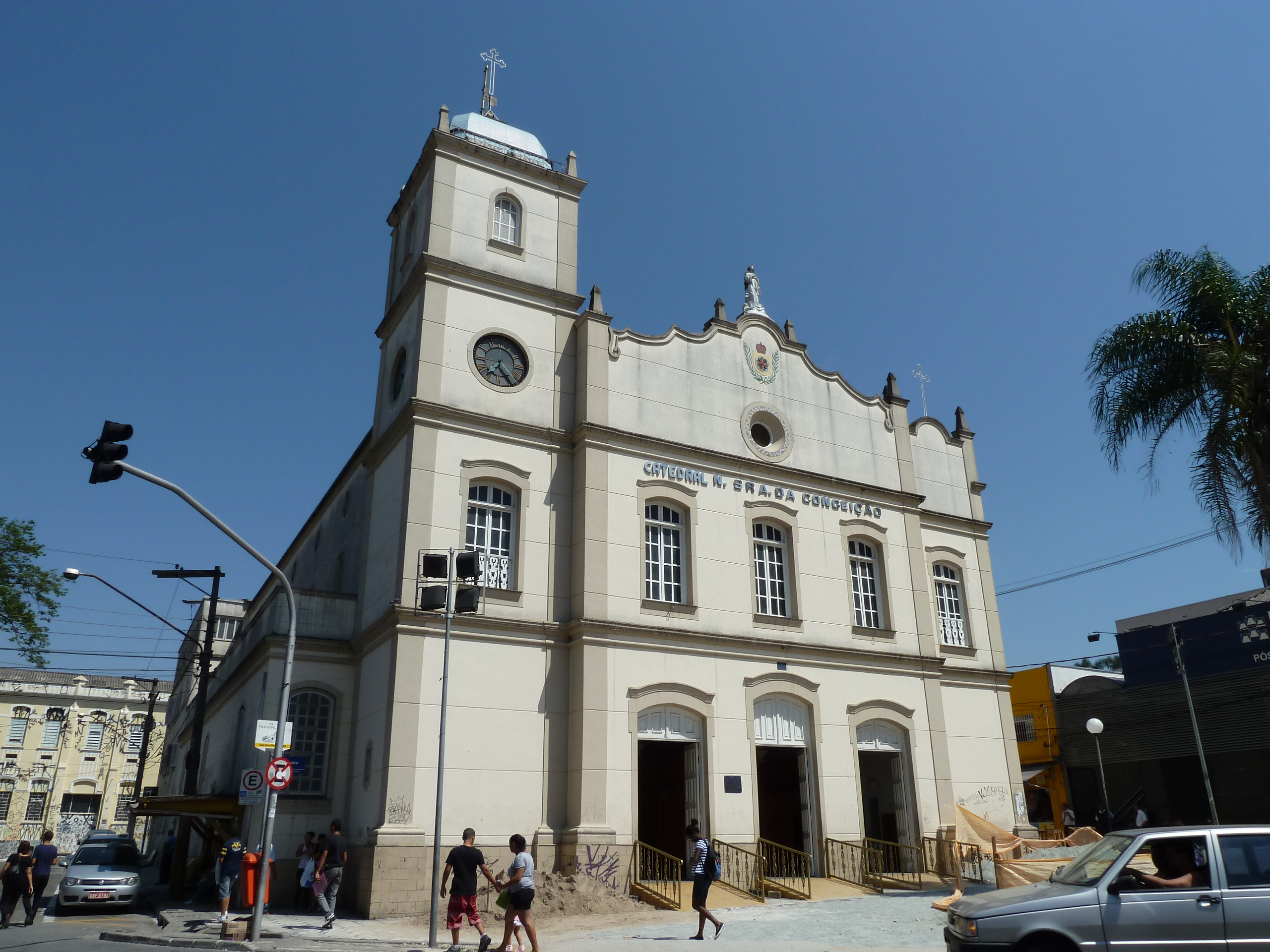
- Catedral Nossa Senhora da Conceição in 2012

Location
- Country: Brazil
- Ecclesiastical province: São Paulo

Statistics
- Area: 341 km^{2} (132 sq mi)
- Population: Total; Catholics: (as of 2004); 1,220,000; 790,000 (64.8%)

Information
- Rite: Latin Rite
- Established: 30 January 1981 (45 years ago)
- Cathedral: Catedral Nossa Senhora da Conceição

Current leadership
- Pope: Leo XIV
- Bishop: Edmilson Amador Caetano
- Metropolitan Archbishop: Odilo Scherer

Map
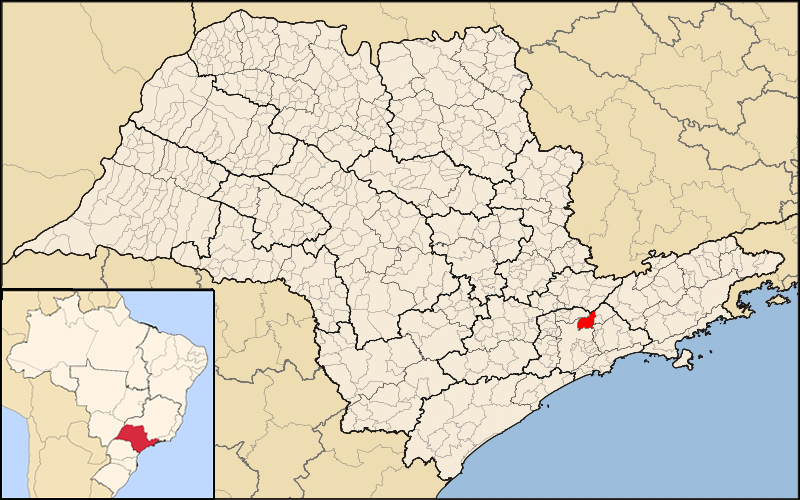

The Roman Catholic Diocese of Guarulhos (Latin: Dioecesis Guaruliensis) is a diocese located in the city of Guarulhos in the ecclesiastical province of São Paulo in Brazil.

== History ==
- 30 January 1981: Established as Diocese of Guarulhos from the Diocese of Mogi das Cruzes

== Bishops ==
=== Ordinaries ===
- Bishops of Guarulhos (Roman rite)
  - Bishop João Bergese (1981.02.11 – 1991.05.05; Appointed Archbishop of Pouso Alegre)
  - Bishop Luiz Gonzaga Bergonzini (1991.12.04 – 2011.11.23)
  - Bishop Joaquim Justino Carreira (2011.11.23 - 2013.09.01)
  - Bishop Edmilson Amador Caetano, O. Cist. (2014.01.29-)

=== Other priest of this diocese who became bishop ===
- Otacilio Francisco Ferreira de Lacerda, appointed Auxiliary Bishop of Belo Horizonte, Minas Gerais.
