= El Liberal (Argentine newspaper) =

- Type: Daily newspaper
- Format: Tabloid
- Owner(s): Grupo Ick (El Liberal S.A.)
- Founder(s): Juan Figueroa
- Publisher: Gustavo Eduardo Ick
- Founded: 3 November 1898
- Political alignment: Centrism
- Language: Spanish
- Headquarters: Santiago del Estero, Argentina
- Circulation: 21,000 (2017)
- Website: ElLiberal.com

El Liberal is a morning newspaper that has been published since 1898 in the city of Santiago del Estero, Argentina. Is one of the most important regional newspapers of the country.

== History ==
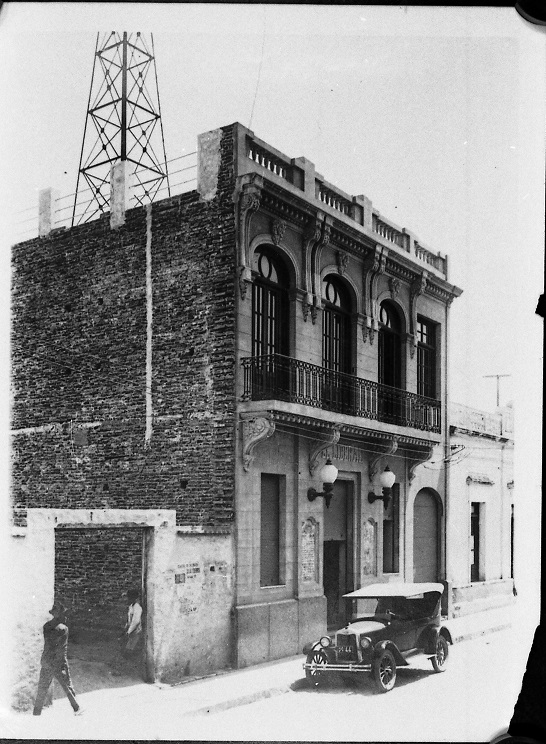
Photo of the facade of the headquarters of the Diario El Liberal in April 1928.

El Liberal was founded by the political activist Juan Figueroa on November 3, 1898. His first print was 200 copies, in an edition that the media remember as "almost handmade", since it was printed with a hand press. It's the oldest newspaper in northern Argentina.

In 1926, the newspaper was transferred to its current headquarters in the center of the capital of Santiago del Estero, and three years later the newspaper was sold to two lawyers: José and Antonio Castiglione; José exercised the direction of the newspaper until his death and was succeeded by his younger brother, Antonio, who redefined the orientation of the newspaper, changing it from an evening tabloid into a morning broadsheet, and leaving his characteristic opinion platform to a journalistic and informative format. After the death of Antonio Castiglione, the editorial board of the newspaper was in charge of Aldo Castiglione (son of Jose) and the executive direction was in charge of Julio César Castiglione (son of Antonio).

The Castiglione family had control of the newspaper until May 7, 2009, when the Ick Group took control. The current director of the newspaper is Gustavo Ick. The headquarters of the newspaper remains in the same location and is printed as tabloid again.

== Editorial stance ==
El Liberal was born as a nationalist progressive newspaper with a secular orientation and strong defense and promotion of civil and political rights. With the management of the Castiglione family, the newspaper was reoriented to an informative journalism, opens its pages to the Catholic Church, and in its editorials shows a centrist position. However, the newspaper kept open its page for center-left wing leaning authors.

The newspaper traditionally advocates for economic, cultural, social, civil and political rights and as well for freedom of expression, environmental protection, sustainable development and free education and healthcare. From its editorial pages, El Liberal supported many civic movements and stood for citizens participation.

During the decade of 1990, the newspaper got international and national acclaim for its investigative pieces, human rights and environmental reporting, photography, visual journalism, health news, human storytelling and its Op-Eds. At that time, El Liberal got awards from the Inter American Press Association, Merck & Co., University of Navarra and other national and international journalism institutions.

== Attacks ==
During the decade of 1990, many journalists of the newspaper suffered aggression from several parties, according to reports of human rights organizations, such as Amnesty International.

In 2000, the Inter American Press Association reported an alleged political and judicial persecution against the newspaper by the governor of Santiago del Estero, Carlos Juárez, in apparent reprisal for his newspaper reports against him. The newspaper faced a lawsuits filed by 4,000 women affiliated with the ruling party, seeking $19 million for material that had already been published by La Voz del Interior another newspaper.

== Notable contributors (past) ==
Columnists and journalists

- Julio Carreras
- Ramón Gómez Cornet
- Homero Manzi
- Bernardo Canal Feijóo
- Oscar Soria
- Joaquín Morales Solá
- Ricardo Trotti
- Jose Curiotto
- Bernardino Sayago
- Tomás Eloy Martínez
