= José María Libório Camino Saracho =

Spanish priest (1931–2021)

- Bishop of Presidente Prudente
- Church: Catholic Church
- Diocese: Diocese of Presidente Prudente
- In office: 20 February 2002 – 16 April 2008
- Predecessor: Antônio Agostinho Marochi
- Successor: Benedito Gonçalves dos Santos
- Previous posts: Titular Bishop of Urusi (1999-2002); Auxiliary Bishop of São Miguel Paulista (1999-2002)

Orders
- Ordination: 6 July 1958
- Consecration: 29 September 1999 by Alfio Rapisarda

Personal details
- Born: 13 November 1931 Santurtzi, Spanish Republic
- Died: 30 August 2021 (aged 89) São Paulo, Brazil
- Coat of arms

José María Libório Camino Saracho (13 November 1931 – 30 August 2021) was a Spanish-Brazilian Roman Catholic prelate. He served as the auxiliary bishop of the Roman Catholic Diocese of São Miguel Paulista from 1999 to 2002, titular bishop of Urusi from 1999 to 2002, and the Bishop of the Roman Catholic Diocese of Presidente Prudente from 2002 until his retirement in April 2008.

Libório was born on 13 November 1931, in Santurtzi, Biscay province in Spain's Basque Country. His childhood was dominated by the Spanish Civil War. He was ordained a Catholic priest on July 6, 1958.

He arrived as missionary in Brazil in 1967. Libório became a priest at the São Benedito parish in the Guaianases of São Paulo in February 1968. Pope John Paul II appointed him as the simultaneous auxiliary bishop of the Roman Catholic Diocese of São Miguel Paulista and the titular bishop of Urusi on 16 July 1999. His ordination took place on September 29, 1999.

Libório was appointed the 4th Bishop of the Roman Catholic Diocese of Presidente Prudente on 20 February 2002, and ordained on 7 April 2002. He served until his retirement on 17 August 2008.

Bishop Emeritus José María Libório Camino Saracho died from complications of gallbladder surgery at Santa Maggiore Hospital in São Paulo on 30 August 2021, at the age of 89. He was buried in the crypt of the Catedral São Miguel Arcanjo in São Miguel Paulista on 31 August 2021.
