= Luiz Gonzaga Bergonzini =

Brazilian Roman Catholic bishop

- Bishop of Guarulhos
- Native name: Luís Gonzaga Bergonzini
- Church: Catholic Church
- Diocese: Diocese of Guarulhos
- In office: 4 December 1991 – 23 November 2011
- Predecessor: Giovanni Bergese
- Successor: Joaquim Justino Carreira

Orders
- Ordination: 29 June 1959
- Consecration: 7 February 1992 by Tomás Vaquero

Personal details
- Born: 20 May 1936 São João da Boa Vista, São Paulo, Republic of the United States of Brazil
- Died: 13 June 2012 (aged 76) Guarulhos, São Paulo, Brazil

Luiz Gonzaga Bergonzini (20 May 1936 – 13 June 2012) was a Brazilian Roman Catholic bishop.

Ordained to the priesthood in 1959, Bergonzini was named bishop of the Roman Catholic Diocese of Guarulhos, Brazil in 1991 and retired on 23 November 2011.
