= Archdiocese of São Paulo =

Latin Catholic jurisdiction in Brazil

Coordinates: 23°33′04″S 46°38′04″W

Archdiocese of São Paulo Archidioecesis Sancti Pauli in Brasilia Arquidiocese de São Paulo

Catholic
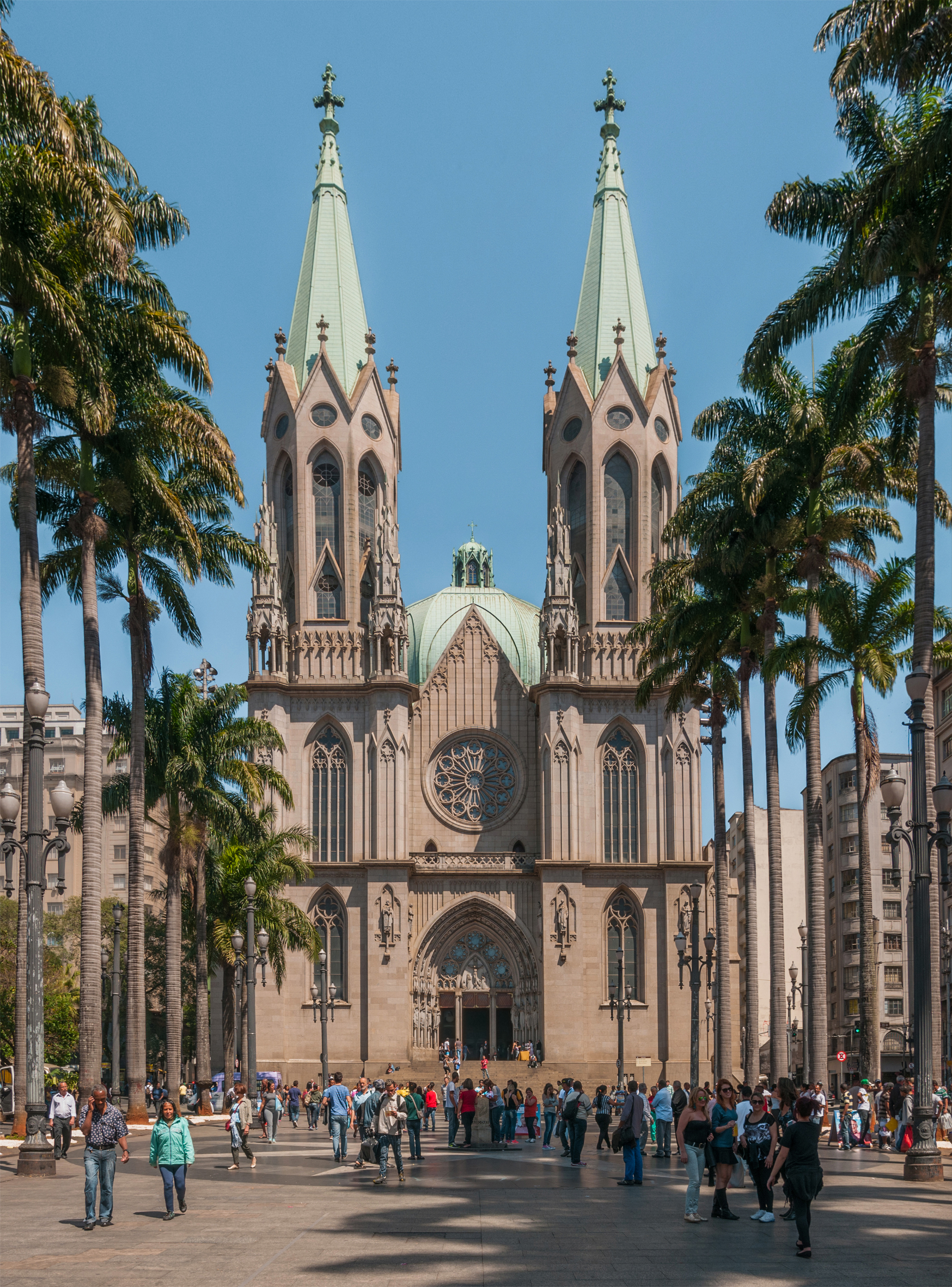
- Metropolitan Cathedral of Our Lady of the Assumption and Saint Paul the Apostle

- Coat of arms

Location
- Country: Brazil
- Ecclesiastical province: São Paulo

Statistics
- Area: 655 km^{2} (253 sq mi)
- Population: Total; Catholics: (as of 2017); 7,669,976; 4,984,484 (65%)

Information
- Denomination: Catholic Church
- Sui iuris church: Latin Church
- Rite: Roman Rite
- Established: 6 December 1745 (280 years ago)
- Cathedral: Catedral Metropolitana Nossa Senhora da Assunção e São Paulo

Current leadership
- Pope: Leo XIV
- Archbishop: Odilo Scherer
- Auxiliary Bishops: Cicero Alves de França; Rogério Augusto das Neves; Carlos Lema Garcia; Carlos Silva; Edilson de Souza Silva

Website
- arquisp.org.br/home

The Archdiocese of São Paulo (Latin: Archidioecesis Sancti Pauli in Brasilia; Portuguese: Arquidiocese de São Paulo) is a Latin Church archdiocese of the Catholic Church in Brazil.

The Archdiocese has been headed by Odilo Scherer since his appointment by Pope Benedict XVI on 21 March 2007, an appointment that ended almost four decades of Franciscan leadership in the archdiocese: both predecessors, Cardinals Paulo Evaristo Arns and Cláudio Hummes, belonged to that Order.

Its cathedral episcopal see, the Catedral Metropolitana Nossa Senhora da Assunção e São Paulo, in the metropolis São Paulo, was dedicated to the Assumption of Mary on September 5, 1964. The city also has three minor basilicas :

- Basílica de Nossa Senhora da Assunção (Marian),
- Basílica de Nossa Senhora do Carmo (Marian) and
- Basílica do Santíssimo Sacramento (dedicated to the Holy Sacrament).

== History ==
- The Diocese of São Paulo was erected by Pope Benedict XIV on 6 December 1745, on vast territory split off from the then Diocese of São Sebastião do Rio de Janeiro.
- It lost territories on April 27, 1892 to establish the Diocese of Curitiba, state of Paraná.
- It lost territories on August 9, 1907 to establish the Diocese of Campanha, state of Minas Gerais.
- It became a Metropolitan Archdiocese on June 7, 1908, when it lost more territories to establish the Dioceses of:
  - Botucatu,
  - Campinas,
  - Ribeirão Preto,
  - São Carlos do Pinhal,
  - Taubaté.
- It lost further territories to establish more Dioceses:
  - Sorocaba,
  - Santos,
  - Bragança Paulista,
  - Santo André,
  - (now Archdiocese) Aparecida,
  - Mogi das Cruzes,
  - Jundiaí,
  - Campo Limpo,
  - Osasco,
  - Santo Amaro,
  - São Miguel Paulista.
- It enjoyed papal visits from Pope John Paul II in July 1980 and Pope Benedict XVI in May 2007.

== Bishops ==
=== Ordinaries ===
Bishops of São Paulo

- Bernardo Rodrigues Nogueira (1745–1748 )
- Antônio da Madre de Deus Galvão, O.F.M. (1750–1764)
- Manuel da Ressurreição, O.F.M. (1771–1789)
- Miguel da Madre de Deus da Cruz, O.F.M. (1791–1795), appointed Archbishop of Braga (Portugal)
- Mateus de Abreu Pereira (1795–1824)
- Manuel Joaquim Gonçalves de Andrade (1827–1847)
- Antônio Joaquim de Melo (1851–1861)
- Sebastião Pinto do Rego (1861–1868)
- Lino Deodato Rodrigues de Carvalho (1871–1894)
- Joaquim Arcoverde de Albuquerque Cavalcanti (1894–1897), appointed Archbishop of São Sebastião do Rio de Janeiro (Cardinal in 1905)
- Antônio Cândido Alvarenga (1898–1903
- José de Camargo Barros (1903–1906)
- Leopoldo Duarte e Silva (1906–1908)

Archbishops of São Paulo

- Leopoldo Duarte e Silva (1908–1938)
- José Gaspar d'Afonseca e Silva (1939–1943)
- Cardinal Carlos Carmelo de Vasconcelos Motta (1944–1964), appointed Archbishop of Aparecida
- Cardinal Agnelo Rossi (1964–1970), appointed Prefect of Congregation for the Propagation of the Faith and later President of Administration of the Patrimony of the Apostolic See
- Cardinal Paulo Evaristo Arns, O.F.M. (1970–1998)
- Cardinal Cláudio Hummes, O.F.M. (1998–2006), appointed Prefect of the Congregation for the Clergy
- Cardinal Odilo Scherer (2007–present)

=== Coadjutor Bishops ===
- Joaquim Arcoverde de Albuquerque Cavalcanti (1892–1894); future Cardinal
- Antônio Maria Alves de Siqueira (1957–1966), did not succeed to see; appointed Coadjutor Archbishop of Campinas, Sao Paulo

=== Auxiliary Bishops ===
- José Gaspar d'Afonseca e Silva (1935–1939), appointed Archbishop here
- Antônio Maria Alves de Siqueira (1947–1957), appointed Coadjutor here
- Paulo Rolim Loureiro (1948–1962), appointed Bishop of Mogi das Cruzes, Sao Paulo
- Antônio Ferreira de Macedo, C.SS.R. (1955–1964), appointed Coadjutor Archbishop of Aparecida, Sao Paulo
- Vicente Angelo José Marchetti Zioni (1955–1964), appointed Bishop of Bauru, Sao Paulo
- Romeu Alberti (1964–1965), appointed Bishop of Apucarana, Parana in 1965
- Gabriel Paulino Bueno Couto, O. Carm. (1965–1966), appointed Bishop of Jundiaí, Sao Paulo
- Paulo Evaristo Arns, O.F.M. (1966–1970), appointed Archbishop here (Cardinal in 1973)
- Bruno Maldaner (1966–1971), appointed Bishop of Frederico Westphalen, Rio Grande do Sul
- José Thurler (1966–1992)
- Lucas Moreira Neves, O.P. (1967–1974), appointed Vice President of the Pontifical Council for the Laity; future Cardinal
- Benedito de Ulhôa Vieira (1971–1978), appointed Archbishop of Uberaba, Minas Gerais
- Angélico Sândalo Bernardino (1974–2000), appointed Bishop of Blumenau, Santa Catarina
- Mauro Morelli (1974–1981), appointed Bishop of Duque de Caxias, Rio de Janeiro
- Joel Ivo Catapan, S.V.D. (1974–1999)
- Francisco Manuel Vieira (1974–1989), appointed Bishop of Osasco, Sao Paulo
- Antônio Celso Queiroz (1975–2000), appointed Bishop of Catanduva, Sao Paulo
- Luciano Pedro Mendes de Almeida, S.J. (1976–1988), appointed Archbishop of Mariana, Minas Gerais
- Fernando José Penteado (1979–2000), appointed Bishop of Jacarezinho, Parana
- Alfredo Ernest Novak, C.SS.R. (1979–1989), appointed Bishop of Paranaguá, Parana
- Décio Pereira (1979–1997), appointed Bishop of Santo André, Sao Paulo
- Antônio Gaspar (1982–2000), appointed Bishop of Barretos, Sao Paulo
- Gil Antônio Moreira (1999–2004), appointed Bishop of Jundiaí, Sao Paulo
- Odilo Pedro Scherer (2001–2007), appointed Archbishop here (Cardinal later in the year)
- Benedito Beni dos Santos (2001–2006), appointed Bishop of Lorena, Sao Paulo
- Manuel Parrado Carral (2001–2008), appointed Bishop of São Miguel Paulista, Sao Paulo
- Pedro Luiz Stringhini (2001–2009), appointed Bishop of Franca, Sao Paulo
- José Benedito Simão (2001–2009), appointed Bishop of Assis, Sao Paulo
- José María Pinheiro (2003–2005), appointed Bishop of Bragança Paulista, Sao Paulo
- Tomé Ferreira da Silva (2005–2012), appointed Bishop of São José do Rio Preto, Sao Paulo
- Joaquim Justino Carreira (2005–2011), appointed Bishop of Guarulhos, Sao Paulo
- João Mamede Filho, O.F.M. (2006–2010), appointed Bishop of Umuarama, Parana
- Tarcísio Scaramussa, S.D.B. (2008–2014), appointed Coadjutor Bishop of Santos, Sao Paulo
- Milton Kenan Júnior (2009–2014), appointed Bishop of Barretos, Sao Paulo
- Edmar Perón (2009–2015), appointed Bishop of Paranaguá, Parana
- Júlio Endi Akamine, S.A.C. (2011–2016), appointed Archbishop of Sorocaba, Sao Paulo
- Sérgio de Deus Borges (2012–2019), appointed Bishop of Foz do Iguaçu, Parana
- Devair Araújo da Fonseca (2014–)
- José Roberto Fortes Palau (2014–2019), appointed Bishop of Limeira, Sao Paulo
- Carlos Lema Garcia (2014–)
- Eduardo Vieira dos Santos (2014–)
- Luiz Carlos Dias (2016–)
- José Benedito Cardoso (2019–)
- Jorge Pierozan (2019–)
- Ângelo Ademir Mezzari, R.C.J. (2020–

=== Other priests of this diocese who became bishops ===
- José Marcondes Homem de Melo, appointed Bishop of Belém do Pará in 1906
- Francisco de Campos Barreto, appointed Bishop of Pelotas, Rio Grande do Sul in 1911
- Sebastião Leme da Silveira Cintra, appointed Auxiliary Bishop of São Sebastião do Rio de Janeiro in 1911; future Cardinal
- Benedito Paulo Alves de Souza, appointed Bishop of Espírito Santo in 1918
- Manuel da Silveira d’Elboux, appointed Auxiliary Bishop of Ribeirão Preto in 1940
- Antônio de Castro Mayer, appointed Coadjutor Bishop of Campos, Rio de Janeiro in 1948
- José Lafayette Ferreira Álvares, appointed Bishop of Bragança Paulista, Sao Paulo in 1971
- Geraldo Majella Agnelo, appointed Bishop of Toledo, Parana in 1978; future Cardinal
- Antônio Carlos Rossi Keller, appointed Bishop of Frederico Westphalen, Rio Grande do Sul in 2008
- José Aparecido Gonçalves de Almeida (priest here, 1986–1989), appointed Auxiliary Bishop of Brasília, Distrito Federal in 2013

== Province ==
Its ecclesiastical province comprises the Metropolitan's own Archdiocese and these suffragan bishoprics:

- Diocese of Campo Limpo
- Diocese of Guarulhos
- Diocese of Mogi das Cruzes
- Diocese of Osasco
- Diocese of Santo Amaro
- Diocese of Santo André
- Diocese of Santos
- Diocese of São Miguel Paulista
- Maronite Eparchy of Nossa Senhora do Líbano em São Paulo
- Eparchy of Nossa Senhora do Paraíso em São Paulo

== See also ==
- List of Roman Catholic dioceses in Brazil

== Sources and external links ==
- Herbermann, Charles, ed. (1913). "São Paulo" . Catholic Encyclopedia. New York: Robert Appleton Company.
- GCatholic.org with incumbent biography links
- Catholic Hierarchy
