= Paulo Evaristo Arns =

Brazilian cardinal (1921–2016)

His Eminence Paulo Arns OFM
- Cardinal, Archbishop Emeritus of São Paulo
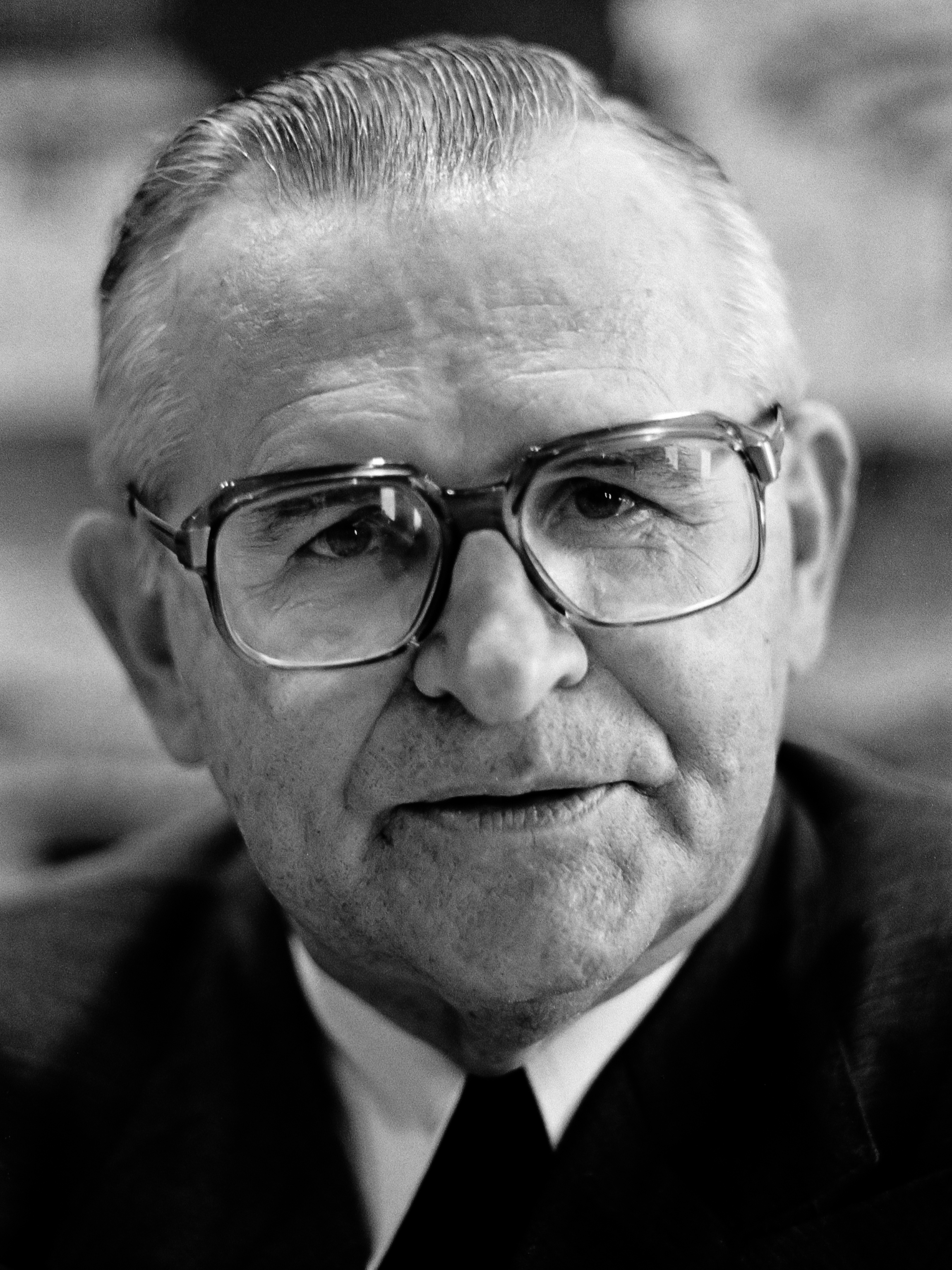
- Arns in 1982
- See: São Paulo (Emeritus)
- Appointed: 22 October 1970
- Installed: 1 November 1970
- Term ended: 9 April 1998
- Predecessor: Agnelo Rossi
- Successor: Cláudio Hummes
- Other post: Cardinal-Priest of Sant’Antonio da Padova in Via Tuscolana
- Previous posts: Auxiliary Bishop of São Paulo (1966–1970); Titular Bishop of Respecta (1966–1970)

Orders
- Ordination: 30 November 1945 by José Pereira Alves
- Consecration: 3 July 1966 by Agnelo Rossi
- Created cardinal: 5 March 1973 by Pope Paul VI
- Rank: Cardinal-Priest

Personal details
- Born: Paulo Evaristo Arns; 14 September 1921 Forquilhinha, Santa Catarina, Brazil
- Died: 14 December 2016 (aged 95) São Paulo, Brazil
- Motto: ex spe in spem
- Coat of arms

Styles of Paulo Evaristo Arns
- Reference style: His Eminence
- Spoken style: Your Eminence
- Informal style: Cardinal
- See: São Paulo (emeritus)

Paulo Evaristo Arns OFM (Brazilian Portuguese: [ˈpawlu evaˈɾistu ˈaʁns]; 14 September 1921 – 14 December 2016) was a Brazilian Catholic prelate who served as Archbishop of São Paulo from 1970 to 1998. He was named a cardinal in 1973 and later became protopriest. He was a member of the Order of Friars Minor.

His ministry began with a twenty-year academic career, and as Archbishop of Sao Paulo Archdiocese was a relentless opponent of Brazil's military dictatorship and its use of torture. He was also an advocate for the poor and a vocal defender of liberation theology. In his later years he openly criticized the way Pope John Paul II governed the Catholic Church through the Roman Curia and questioned his teaching on priestly celibacy and other issues.

== Early life and education ==
Paulo Steiner Arns was born as the fifth of thirteen children of the German immigrants Gabriel and Helana (née Steiner) Arns. Three of his sisters would later become nuns and one of his brothers a Franciscan. One of his sisters, Zilda Arns Neumann, a pediatrician who founded the Brazilian bishops' children's commission, was killed in the 2010 Haiti earthquake.

On 10 December 1943, Arns joined the Franciscans; he was ordained a priest on 30 November 1945.

From 1941 to 1943 Arns studied philosophy in Curitiba and then theology from 1944 to 1947 in Petrópolis. Then he attended the Sorbonne in Paris studying literature, Latin, Greek, Syriac at the Ecole Pratique des Hautes Etudes, and ancient history. He graduated with a doctorate in classical languages in 1946. Arns later returned to the Sorbonne to study for a Doctor of Letters which he obtained in 1950, writing a dissertation titled "La technique du livre d'après Saint Jérome".

Arns then fulfilled a series of academic assignments in Brazil. He taught at the seminary of Agudos in São Paulo. He lectured as a member of the faculty of Philosophy, Science and Letters of Bauru, and had responsibilities at a number of other institutions of higher education, usually faculty positions, and became a professor at the Catholic University of Petrópolis.

Arns was elected vice-provincial of the province of the Immaculate Conception of the Friars Minor. He was the director of the monthly review for religious Sponsa Christi.

== Bishop and Cardinal ==
Pope Paul VI named Arns titular bishop of Respecta and auxiliary bishop of São Paulo on 2 May 1966. He was consecrated on 3 July 1966 by Cardinal Agnelo Rossi. The same pope appointed him Archbishop of São Paulo on 22 October 1970 and he was installed on 1 November. In 1973 he sold the episcopal palace, a mansion standing in its own park. Two things horrified him: the massive electricity bills and the staff of 25 sisters and brothers assigned to look after his needs. He used the money from the sale to build a social station in the favelas.

He remained Archbishop of São Paulo for 28 years and managed an expansion of the church's presence and outreach by creating 43 parishes and more than 1,200 community centers. He also promoted the organization of more than 2000 basic ecclesial communities. He developed AIDS education programs and ministries for homeless children and prisoners. With his sister Dr. Zilda, he founded Pastoral da Criança (Pastoral Care for Children), an organ for social action of the National Conference of Bishops of Brazil.

After the first meeting between Church and Freemasonry which had been held on 11 April 1969 at the convent of the Divine Master in Ariccia, he was the protagonist of a series of public handshakes between high prelates of the Roman Catholic Church and the heads of Freemasonry.

In the consistory of 5 March 1973, Pope Paul VI made him Cardinal-Priest of Sant'Antonio da Padova in Via Tuscolana. He participated as a cardinal-elector in the two conclaves of 1978 that elected Popes John Paul I and John Paul II.

From 1983 to 1991 he served as secretary to the Synod of Bishops, but only in 2005 did he speak publicly of his experience: "I had responsibility for recording the conclusions of one synod and drafting the documents in preparation for the next. Nothing of what we prepared was ever taken into consideration. Very competent people carried out the whole process, but the texts were never used.... The conclusions were formulated in such a way that they no longer reflected what had been said in the discussions."

In the mid-1980s, Arns' programs for the development of priestly vocations came under fire from Vatican authorities that suspected its ties to liberation theology. The seminarians lived in eleven small communities of seven or eight and each group was tied to a base community. The seminaries also held secular jobs in order to provide support to their families during their priestly formation. Cardinal Joseph Ratzinger, head of the Congregation for the Doctrine of the Faith (CDF), appointed Cardinal Joseph Höffner of Cologne, known for his conservative positions, to conduct an investigation. In Brazil he praised the São Paulo program, but submitted a largely negative report to the CDF.

In 1989, Arns sent a letter to Fidel Castro on the 30th anniversary of the Cuban Revolution. He praised Cuba's record on social justice and wrote that "Christian faith discovers in the achievements of the revolution signs of the kingdom of God.... You are present daily in my prayers, and I ask the Father that he always concede you the grace of guiding the destinies of your country." Political and theological conservatives, including Cardinal Eugenio Sales of Rio de Janeiro, protested what they interpreted as support for Castro's continued rule. Leonardo Boff, the foremost figure in the liberation theology movement, defended Arns, saying: "Cuba carried out a revolution against hunger by ending prostitution, illiteracy and misery. Dom Paulo [Arns] is not a socialist, but a man of the poor and the oppressed." Arns said the letter was part of an ongoing dialogue with Castro and that he opposed dictatorship.

=== Church governance ===
Before Paul VI died in 1978, Arns worked with him on a plan for the division of the Archdiocese of São Paulo. It would have established subordinate dioceses under independent bishops who would share financial and institutional resources and a common pastoral plan with each other and the archdiocese. It was never implemented. Instead, on 15 March 1989, the archdiocese was split into five dioceses in a way that, in Arns' view, divided the rich and the poor. (Note: The four new dioceses were Campo Limpo, Osasco, Santo Amaro, and São Miguel Paulista.) His archdiocese lost half of its population, retaining the largely middle class core of the city and isolating it from the city's "impoverished periphery". None of the bishops chosen to head the new dioceses were drawn from the list of candidates Arns had submitted. He said: "everything I asked for was disregarded and the traditionalist line prevailed. It was our wish that a different way of dealing with pastoral activities in the metropolitan regions be adopted, but the Roman Curia, treating this just as any other matter, paid no heed for it. ...Because of the way it was done, the church in São Paulo is spending 10 times more in order to produce results which are 10 times smaller".

Just days before submitting his resignation as Archbishop of São Paulo, as he was required to when he turned 75, Arns told a Brazilian newspaper that he had told Pope John Paul II that he allowed the Roman Curia, the central administration of the Catholic Church, "too free a rein". He said the pope had replied "You are mistaken. The curia is the pope" and that he in turn had strongly disagreed. He explained to his interviewer: "My impression is that the curia is governing the church." (Note: He contrasted John Paul II's governance with that of his predecessor: "With Paul VI it was different. He actually governed through the curia. He had his ear to the ground, was constantly briefed by his staff, and was truly in control of events. This was made possible because he had been part of the curia for a long time, had grown up within it, and knew everything concerning it. The present pope is much more interested in traveling, preaching, being a missionary, than watching over the curia. He leaves everything to them, with the result that they now enjoy an incomparably greater autonomy than they had under Paul VI.")

According to Boff, when Arns was celebrating Mass and recognized someone in the congregation as a priest who had married, he invited the man to concelebrate Mass with him. His stance on married priests was: "They are still priests and they will remain priests."

=== Liberation theology ===
In 1968, attending the Conference of Latin American Bishops in Medellín, Colombia, he endorsed the fundamental principle of liberation theology, the "preferential option for the poor". In 1984, he joined other Brazilian prelates in Rome when theologian Leonardo Boff, the foremost figure in the liberation theology movement and a former student of Arns, was examined by Cardinal Joseph Ratzinger (later Pope Benedict XVI), head of the Congregation for the Doctrine of the Faith. Boff said that he thought he was not actually the target of the Vatican investigation as much as the entire church in Brazil and its activism on behalf of the poor. Arns predicted that Boff's examination would produce no "surrender" because "The liberation of the poor is an aspiration rooted in human dignity. The message of liberation is central to Christianity." One historian described it as "not an exercise in abstruse theological semantics but a debate over the future of the Church in Brazil." Arns and Cardinal Aloisio Lorscheider of Fortaleza joined Ratzinger and Boff for part of their four-hour meeting, after being denied their request to attend the entire meeting. Later meetings between Brazil's senior prelates, including Arns, and Pope John Paul II, cooled the conflict to a degree, and in 1986 Arns offered a conciliatory statement that he agreed with the Pope's admonition against priests taking part in politics directly, but he defended the church's advocacy on behalf of such powerless groups as peasants and native peoples, workers and inhabitants of urban slums.

Arns produced letters from the Roman Curia that he believed were evidence that Boff was treated unfairly.

Arns always encouraged the development of the base community movement that derived from commitment to a preferential option for the oppressed and the poor. He encouraged religious orders in São Paulo to transfer their energies from middle class schools and hospitals in central areas of the city to the millions of marginalised people living on the periphery. With respect to the requirement that Catholics practice abstinence on certain days, that is, refrain from eating meat, Arns told the poor that on such a day "if they can find meat to eat, which is rare, they should eat it, and do some good work to mark the day, because not eating meat is not the point." He defended his position by saying that "Canon law gives me full power to dispense people from abstinence; there is no problem."

=== Brazilian dictatorship ===
A military government ruled Brazil from 1964 to 1985. Arns' tireless campaigning against that government's human rights abuses made him a popular figure in Brazil. During the dictatorship he visited political prisoners and spoke out against the abuses of the military. Not long after Arns became Archbishop, police raided the home of a young priest and arrested him for organizing a campaign for increased wages for workers. When Arns was denied access to the imprisoned priest, he denounced the arrest on the Archdiocese's radio station and in its newspaper. He had a description of the priest's arrest and torture posted at the door of every church. The Latin American correspondent for the National Catholic Reporter described this as the beginning of "an open war between the archdiocese and the military." While his colleague Archbishop Helder Camara of Olinda and Recife had long played a direct role in politics, Arns opposed the regime while maintaining an apolitical posture, but with an uncompromising criticism that belied his short time as archbishop and his scholarly background.

Arns initiated a years-long campaign against torture and made it a priority pursued by the Brazilian Conference of Bishops. In 1975 the regime's censors at times restricted Arns's ability to protest by refusing permission to print his views in the archdiocesan weekly newspaper, O São Paulo. He had written: "Even last week, a number of cases of torture took place in São Paulo. A number of persons were arrested, hooded and are kept incommunicado for a long time.... Systematic torture has been instituted in Brazil with modern techniques to obtain confessions from ordinary as well as political prisoners." Authorities did not allow the archdiocesan radio station to broadcast for a year. When authorities called the death of journalist Vladimir Herzog in prison a suicide, Arns led an ecumenical memorial service and characterized Herzog's death differently, saying "Those who stain their hands with blood are damned. Thou shalt not kill." A message the next week read in all the churches of the archdiocese said: "It is not lawful during interrogation of suspects to use methods of physical, psychological or moral torture, above all when taken to the limits of mutilation and even to death, as has been happening."

Arns supported the underground effort to document torture in Brazil's prisons that, when smuggled out of the country, was published years later as Brasil: Nunca Mais (Brazil: Never Again) in 1985. It used trial transcripts as evidence of the torture of political prisoners, including names and dates and detailed descriptions of methods and equipment. A voluminous investigative document that chronicled the military government’s torture of political opponents, it was compiled largely in secret and used military trial transcripts to build its case.

== Retirement and death ==
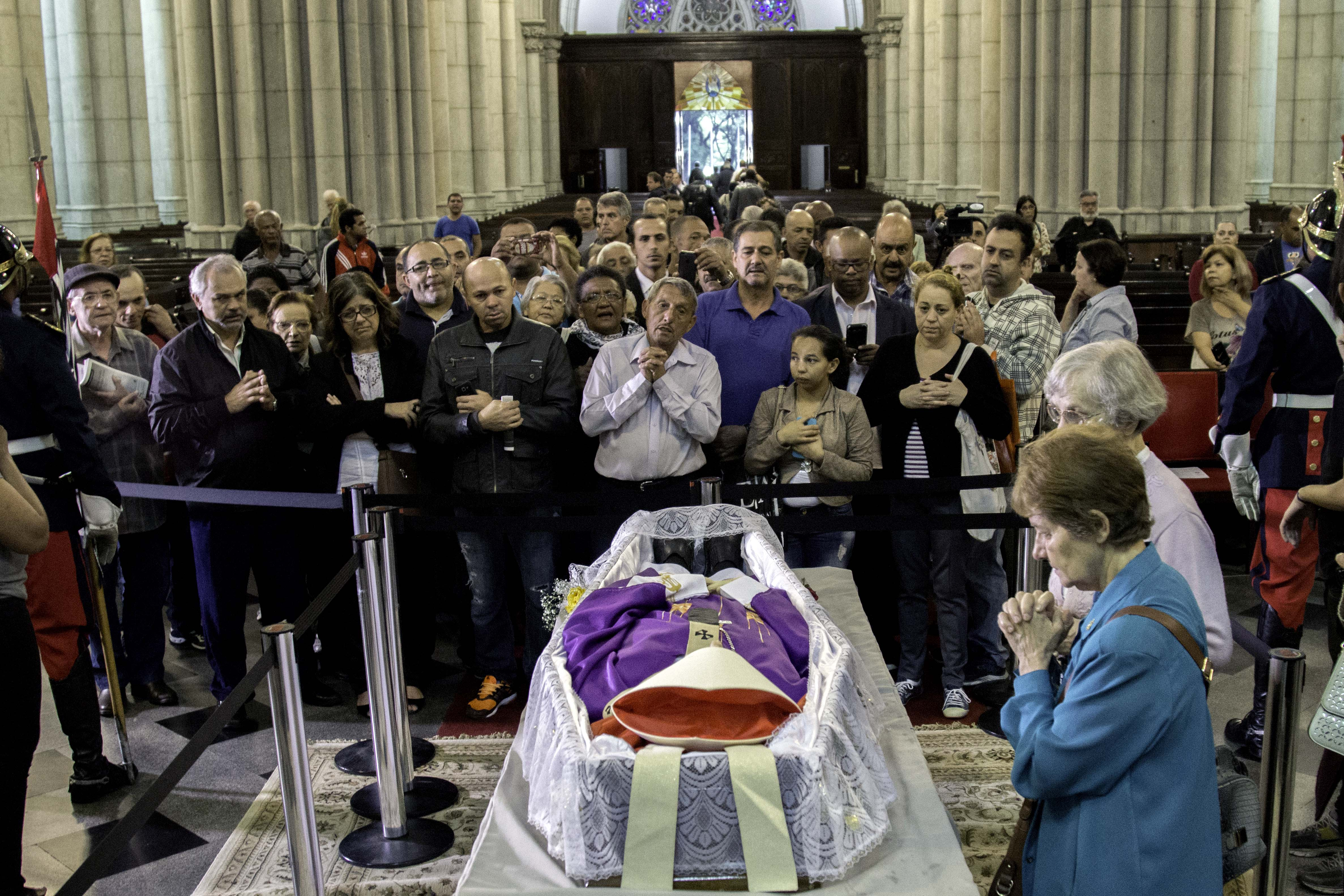
People queuing to pay their respects to the late Cardinal Arns.

Pope John Paul II accepted Cardinal Arns' resignation on 15 April 1998. Since he was past the age of 80, he did not participate in the conclave of 2005 that elected Pope Benedict XVI. In 2013 he did not travel to Rome to participate as a non-elector at the conclave that chose Pope Francis.

After retiring as archbishop, Arns held the UNESCO Chair for Peace Education, Human Rights, Democracy and Tolerance at the State University of São Paulo.

In 2002, Arns criticised U.S. President George W. Bush for his approach to international cooperation in the aftermath of the September 11 attacks, noting that "the president did not go to the United Nations to seek the opinion of everyone. He went alone to the most important governments of the world. I felt this showed a lack of world sensitivity." He condemned the war in Afghanistan as well, describing it as "a war against a nation when one man or two or three or 10 are responsible."

Also in 2002, he became one of the highest-ranking members of the church to express public disagreement with the church position of clerical celibacy, claiming it was an unnecessary rule without Biblical basis. He criticised Pope John Paul II for prohibiting debate on the subject.

In April 2005, during the interregnum between the death of Pope John Paul II and the election of Pope Benedict XVI, Arns gave a wide-ranging interview assessing the former's papacy and his own years as Archbishop of Sao Paulo. Asked about Church opposition to the use of condoms to prevents the spread of AIDS, he said: "I cannot be against a decision of the pope's. If it were my decision I would be against death and for life. The use of the condoms should not be interpreted as a liberalisation of sex." He criticised the Curia for not promoting diversity of opinion within the Church and for lacking an ecumenical attitude.

Pope Benedict's meeting with Arns during his visit to Brazil in 2007 was viewed as a moment of reconciliation after their earlier dispute about liberation theology.

Upon the death of Cardinal William Wakefield Baum on 23 July 2015, Arns became the last surviving cardinal elevated by Pope Paul VI. (Note: Though Joseph Ratzinger, also created a cardinal by Paul VI, would live until 2022, his membership in the College of Cardinals had ended upon his election in 2005 as Pope Benedict XVI. Ratzinger would become Pope emeritus Benedict XVI in 2013.)

For several years before his death, Arns withdrew from public life and lived in a retreat house in Taboão da Serra on the outskirts of São Paulo. After a long illness he died in a São Paulo hospital on 14 December 2016. His coffin was carried into the crypt of São Paulo Cathedral on 16 December as the congregation applauded and took up the chants "viva Dom Paulo" and "courage".

== Distinctions ==
- Letelier-Moffitt Human Rights Award (1982)
- Nansen Refugee Award (1985)
- Niwano Peace Prize (1994)

Honorary degrees

As of March 2013, he had received 24 honorary degrees,

- University of Brasília
- Pontifical Catholic University of Goiás
- University of Münster
- Catholic University of Nijmegen, Netherlands
- University of Notre Dame (1977)
- Fordham University (1981)

== Selected writings ==
Author

- A quem iremos, Senhor? – To Whom Shall We Go, Lord?
- A humanidade caminha para a fraternidade – Humanity on the Road toward Fraternity
- Paulo VI: Você é contra ou a favor? – Paul VI: Are you for or against?
- Cartas de Santo Inácio: Introdução, Tradução e Notas – Letters of Saint Ignatius: Introduction, Translation, and Notes
- Cartas de São Clemente Romano: Introdução, Tradução e Notas – Letters of St. Clement of Rome: Introduction, Translation, and Notes
- A guerra acabará se você quiser – Wars Will End If You Want
- Comunidade: união e ação – Community: Union and Action
- Da Esperança à Utopia – From Hope to Utopia (Autobiography)

Translator

- Cardinal Leo Joseph Suenens, A Corresponsabilidade na Igreja de Hoje (The Coresponsibility of the Church Today)
- Cardinal Jean Daniélou, Nova História da Igreja (A New History of the Church)

== See also ==
- Torture Never Again, an organization

== Notes ==
Catholic Church titles
Preceded by Agnelo Rossi	Archbishop of São Paulo; 1970–1998	Succeeded by Cláudio Hummes
Preceded by Eugênio Sales	Cardinal Protopriest; 9 July 2012 – 14 December 2016	Succeeded by Michael Michai Kitbunchu
Records
Preceded by Franz König	Last Surviving Cardinal by Pope Paul VI; 14 December 2016	Succeeded by none
