= Oscar Soria =

Argentinian political activist (born 1974)

- Born: Santiago del Estero, Argentina
- Occupations: Campaign Director, Avaaz; Media director, WWF; Various senior roles, Greenpeace; News editor, El Liberal; Founder and Executive Director, Salus Terrae
- Employer: Avaaz

Oscar Soria (born 1974) is an Argentinian political activist, social journalist, and environmental and human rights campaigner, currently serving as a campaign director in the international activist group Avaaz. Previously he was the global brand director of Greenpeace and afterwards the senior media and external relations director of WWF.

Soria has written dozens of articles about activism and progressive causes. He was also part of the directorate of the British section of Oxfam and confidant and close adviser of progressive politicians, social advocates and NGO leaders in Latin America and Asia.

== Early and personal life ==
Born in Santiago del Estero in a traditional political family and raised in Buenos Aires, Argentina, he went back to his province in 1984 with his family, during the beginning of the democratic transition in the aftermath of the National Reorganization Process. He led many efforts to promote transitional justice, in particular over forced disappearances and the stolen children during the dictatorship in the country.

Soria started his journalism career in the newspaper El Liberal when he was 14, becoming the youngest journalist in the Argentine media, leading high-profile investigative reports on social, environmental and human rights issues. He was known for shifting the rules of covering political campaigns, by refusing visibility to rallies or negative campaigning and organising instead local debates, community forums, off-line civic and open-source journalism formats, focusing the discussions in party platforms rather than candidates.

== Activism ==
=== Grassroots organizing ===
Since the age of 16, he was involved in neighborhood organizing, youth work in his community, and mass mobilizations against land grabbing.

In 1993 he founded the human rights and environmental justice movement Salus Terrae, which brought youth activists from rural areas and poor neighborhoods with university students and youth groups of the Catholic church. With this group, they campaigned for lands rights and water access, and successfully stopped deforestation and agribusiness plans, nuclear repositories and mass river engineering projects. The group were known by their high-profile exposes, denouncing illegal toxic waste and deforestation. During his campaign against the channelization project called "Canal Federal", there were notorious public clashes between Soria and then the governor of Santiago del Estero, Carlos Juárez, the national environmental secretary María Julia Alsogaray and the president of Argentina, Carlos Menem.

=== Environmental causes ===
In 1999 Soria was appointed in Greenpeace, where his early adoption of mobile phones led into landmark victories in forest protection and indigenous rights in Argentina. He also designed a successful campaign towards the reduction of waste by encouraging individuals to participate in mobile campaigning.

Soria later designed high-profile campaigns on GMOs, deforestation, pollution and climate change, leading mass global pressure against companies such as Nestlé, Tata Group, Volkswagen, Mattel or McDonald's, using subvertising, internet activism, mobile campaigns and other creative confrontational tactics in United States, United Kingdom, Japan, China, India, Russia, Brazil, Turkey and in the Netherlands. A political TV show called him "the man who shakes companies"

He also advised indigenous movements and communities opposed to oil, mining, paper mills and agribusiness projects in Argentina, Chile, Paraguay and Uruguay during the 90s.

In February 2012 Soria left Greenpeace International to join the global group WWF in its world's headquarters in Switzerland where he led social media campaigns against illegal wildlife trade and climate change. After two years in WWF International, Soria left the organisation and joined the advocacy operations of Avaaz in the United States to work on a broader agenda, in particular in the intersection on human rights, environmental justice and economic equity.

From Avaaz, in an OpEd in the New York Times, Soria called on Latin American leaders Mauricio Macri and Enrique Peña Nieto to take a more prominent role to tackle thelimat crisis c in the region. He later repeated that plea in commentary articles in the Argentine newspapers Clarin and La Nacion.

=== Human rights and humanitarian issues ===
Representing Avaaz, Soria has pushed for reaching an agreement on a Global Compact on Migration and in a UNESCO conference he made a plea to religious and civil society leaders to keep political pressure on world leaders: "There’s a painful exodus happening, where millions of the poorest of the poor are displaced by wars and environmental crises. They lost everything. An immense diaspora is seeking hope and a better future, and in that ordeal they often meet stigmatization, rejection, humiliation, slavery and even the very death they sought to escape. During my adult life, I have met many refugees and displaced people. In spite of their grief and desolation, behind their loss of hope, there’s a spirit of determination and overcoming. Despite their despair, many haven’t given up and they have dreams. And if they haven’t given up, how on Earth do we have the right to give up?"

Soria has also advocated for a stronger Catholic leadership on refugees, praising the decision of Pope Francis to wash the feet of the refugees during Easter in 2016, while calling for a political solution to the migrant crisis in Europe. He said Pope's gesture was "a very important message to world leaders." Few days later, in an opinion piece in La Nación, Soria called on Argentina's president Mauricio Macri to take more leadership on refugee policy.

In August 2017, in an interview with Vice, Soria criticized the tactics of the right wing group Defend Europe against refugees in the Mediterranean Sea. The C-Star, a vessel of rented by the identitarian group, originally planned to land at Catania's harbor and prevent NGO ships from assisting migrants in danger, but the operation was aborted after citizens, unions, migrant workers, faith groups and Avaaz activists blocked the port. Soria later said, "Our lawyers, who had examined the legal position, wanted authorities to know that they not only had the power to close the port, but should do so in order to prevent the C-Star from frustrating efforts to rescue refugees at risk at sea."

Soria supported a legal fight from indigenous peoples and local communities from the Amazon in their struggle over their lands. A landmark ruling in February 2022 decided they must have a far stronger say over oil, mining and other extractive projects that affect their lands. Soria said to The New York Times that such decision “it’s by far one of the most powerful rulings that supports free, prior and informed consent to Indigenous peoples to date.”

=== Technology and social media accountability ===
During the COVID-19 pandemic, Soria was outspoken critic of the social media platforms for its lack of action to stop the spread of misinformation and conspiracy theories. “These conspiracy theories are like the virus itself,” he said to the Washington Post.

Soria was also a leading voice in criticizing the tech industry for its inability to tackle digital disinformation in Spanish during the 2020 presidential elections in the United States. As the final votes in the 2020 election are tallied, Soria denounced that misinformation was swirling online, from unsubstantiated allegations of fraud to misleading statements about the results. Presenting a research conducted by Avaaz focused on disinformation within the Hispanic community during the election, Soria told CNN that Avaaz has tracked numerous Spanish-language posts with false information fear mongering about post-election protests and unsubstantiated allegations of fraud. "We've been overwhelmed by the amount of different disinformation out there. The threat is real, the disorientation this has caused is undermining faith in the US democracy," he said.

== Publications ==
Soria has written dozens of articles about activism and progressive causes. He appears regularly or contributes to CNN en Español, New York Times, Vatican Radio, Vice, La Nación, Clarín and Página/12.
