= Mauro Bergonzini =

Italian footballer

Personal information
- Date of birth: 7 July 1912
- Place of birth: Modena, Italy
- Position: Midfielder

Senior career*
Years	Team	Apps	(Gls)
1936–1937	Cosenza		
1937–1938	Juventus	3	(1)
1938–1941	Salernitana		
1943–1944	Centese	2	(0)
1945–1946	Mirandolese		
- * Club domestic league appearances and goals

Mauro Bergonzini (born 7 July 1912 in Modena) was an Italian football player.

== Honours ==
- Coppa Italia winner: 1937–38.
