= Ercílio Turco =

Brazilian Roman Catholic bishop (1938–2019)

- Bishop of Osasco
- Church: Catholic Church
- Diocese: Diocese of Osasco
- In office: 24 April 2002 – 16 April 2014
- Predecessor: Francisco Manuel Vieira
- Successor: João Bosco Barbosa de Sousa
- Previous post: Bishop of Limeira (1989-2002)

Orders
- Ordination: 1 December 1963 by Paulo de Tarso Campos
- Consecration: 4 February 1990 by Gilberto Pereira Lopes

Personal details
- Born: 13 March 1938 Campinas, São Paulo, Republic of the United States of Brazil
- Died: 30 October 2019 (aged 81) São Paulo, São Paulo, Brazil

Ercílio Turco (13 March 1938 – 30 October 2019) was a Brazilian Roman Catholic bishop.

Turco was born in Brazil and was ordained to the priesthood in 1963. He served as bishop of the Roman Catholic Diocese of Limeira, Brazil, from 1989 to 2002 and as bishop of the Roman Catholic Diocese of Osasco, Brazil, from 2002 to 2014.
