= Diocese of Osasco =

Catholic ecclesiastical territory

Diocese of Osasco Dioecesis Osascanensis

Catholic
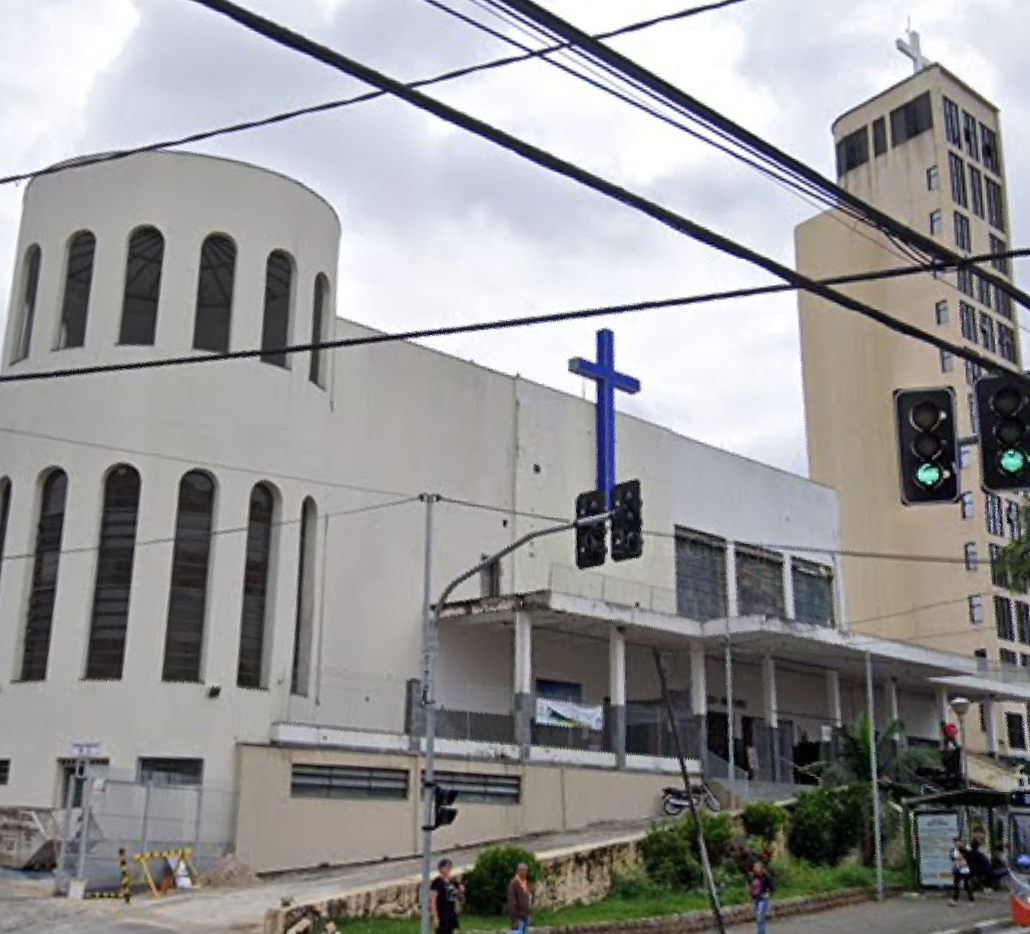
- Cathedral of St. Anthony in 2020

Location
- Country: Brazil
- Ecclesiastical province: São Paulo

Statistics
- Area: 2,416 km^{2} (933 sq mi)
- Population: Total; Catholics: (as of 2004); 2,160,175; 1,786,420 (82.7%)

Information
- Rite: Latin Rite
- Established: 15 March 1989 (37 years ago)
- Cathedral: Catedral Santo Antônio

Current leadership
- Pope: Leo XIV
- Bishop: Joao Bosco Barbosa de Sousa, O.F.M.
- Metropolitan Archbishop: Odilo Scherer

Website
- www.diocesedeosasco.com.br

The Roman Catholic Diocese of Osasco (Latin: Dioecesis Osascanensis) is a diocese located in the city of Osasco in the ecclesiastical province of São Paulo in Brazil.

== History ==
- 15 March 1989: Established as Diocese of Osasco from the Metropolitan Archdiocese of São Paulo

== Leadership ==
- Bishops of Osasco (Roman rite)
  - Bishop João Bosco Barbosa de Sousa (2014.04.16 - today)
  - Bishop Ercílio Turco (2002.04.24 – 2014.4.16)
  - Bishop Francisco Manuel Vieira (1989.03.15 – 2002.04.24)
