= Diocese of Assis =

Catholic ecclesiastical territory

Coordinates: 22.6619°S 50.4129°W

Diocese of Assis Dioecesis Assisensis Diocese de Assis
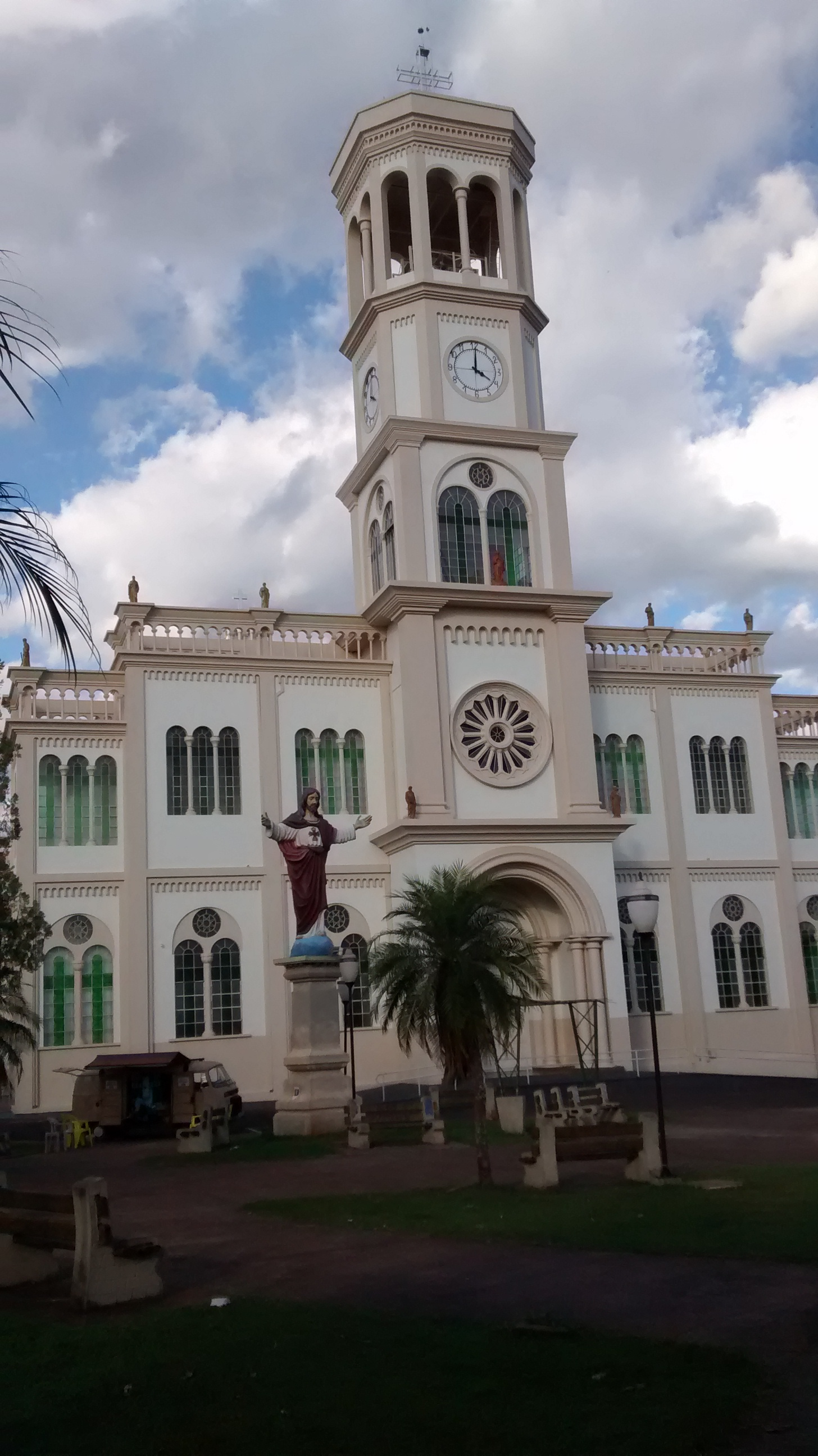
- Cathedral Sacred Heart of Jesus in Assis

Location
- Country: Brazil
- Ecclesiastical province: Botucatu
- Metropolitan: Botucatu

Statistics
- Area: 9,187 km^{2} (3,547 sq mi)
- Population: Total; Catholics: (as of 2012); 314,000; 267,000 (85%)
- Parishes: 25

Information
- Rite: Latin Rite
- Established: 11 November 1928 (97 years ago)
- Cathedral: Cathedral of the Sacred Heart of Jesus in Assis

Current leadership
- Pope: Leo XIV
- Bishop: Argemiro de Azevedo
- Metropolitan Archbishop: Maurício Grotto de Camargo
- Bishops emeritus: Antônio de Souza Bishop Emeritus

Website
- http://www.diocesedeassis.org/

The Roman Catholic Diocese of Assis (Latin: Dioecesis Assisensis) is a diocese located in the city of Assis in the ecclesiastical province of Botucatu in Brazil.

== History ==
- November 11, 1928: Established as Diocese of Assis from the Diocese of Botucatu

== Special churches ==
- Minor Basilicas:
  - Basílica São Vicente de Paulo

== Bishops ==
- Bishops of Assis (Latin Rite)
  - Antônio José dos Santos, C.M. (1929.11.22 – 1956.02.01)
  - José Lázaro Neves, C.M. (1956.02.11 – 1977.07.20)
  - Antônio de Souza, C.S.S. (1977.07.20 – 2004.10.27)
  - Maurício Grotto de Camargo (2004.10.27 – 2008.11.19), appointed Archbishop of Botucatu
  - José Benedito Simão (2009.06.24 - 2015.11.27 )
  - Argemiro de Azevedo (2017.02.25 - present)

=== Coadjutor bishops ===
- José Lázaro Neves, C.M. (1952-1956)
- Antônio de Souza, C.S.S. (1974-1977)

=== Auxiliary bishops ===
- José Lázaro Neves, C.M. (1948-1952), appointed Coadjutor here
- Eugène Lambert Adrian Rixen (1995-1998), appointed Bishop of Goiás

=== Other priest of this diocese who became bishop ===
- Otacílio Luziano Da Silva, appointed Bishop of Catanduva, São Paulo in 2009

== Sources ==
- GCatholic.org
- Catholic Hierarchy
