= Bom Jesus dos Perdões =

Municipality in the state of São Paulo in Brazil

- Municipality
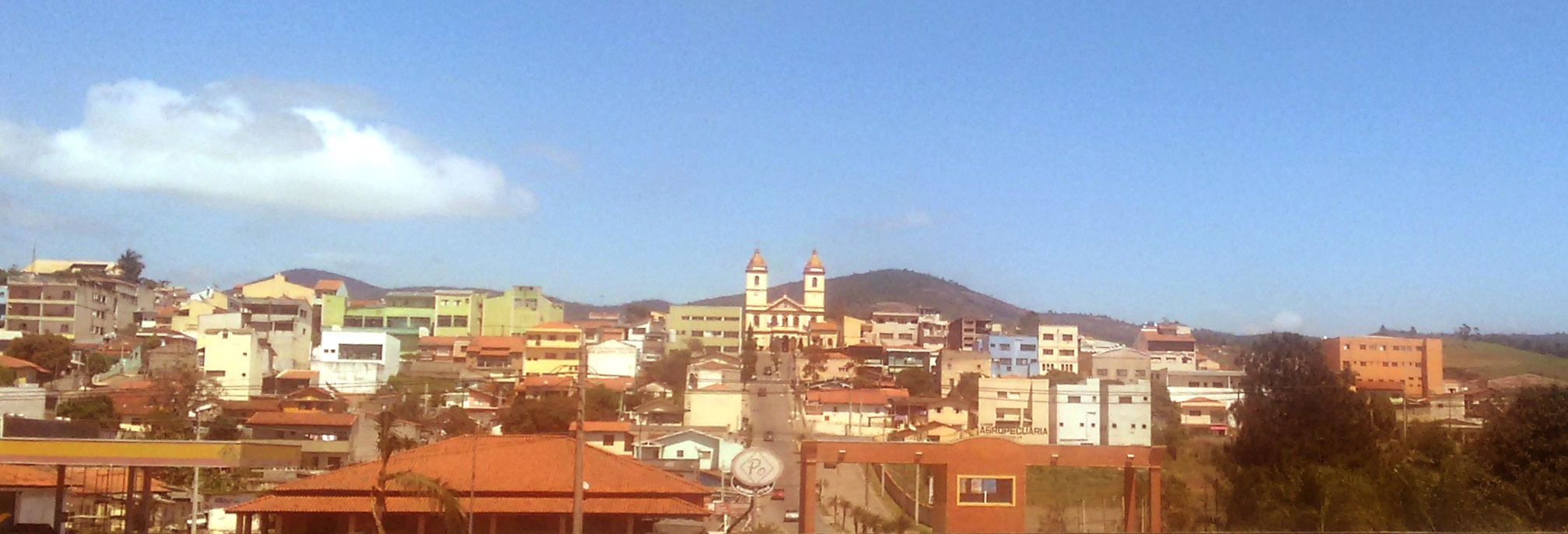
- View of Bom Jesus dos Perdões

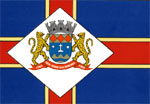
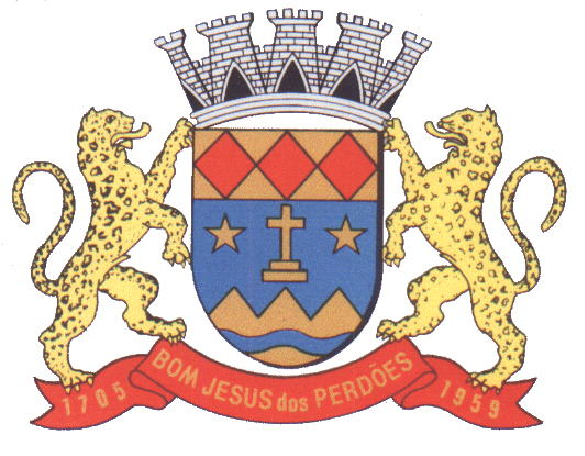
- Flag Coat of arms

- Location in São Paulo state

- Location in Brazil
- Coordinates: 23°8′6″S 46°27′55″W
- Country: Brazil
- Region: Southeast
- State: São Paulo

Area
  - Total: 108 km^{2} (42 sq mi)

Population (2020)
  - Total: 25,985
  - Density: 241/km^{2} (623/sq mi)
- Time zone: UTC−3 (BRT)

Bom Jesus dos Perdões is a municipality in the state of São Paulo, Brazil. The population is 25,985 (2020 est.) in an area of 108 km^{2}. The municipality is at an elevation of 770 m.

== Demographics ==
Historical population (municipality)
Year	Population	%±
1960	2,605	—
1970	3,834	47.2%
1980	7,096	85.1%
1991	9,854	38.9%
2000	13,313	35.1%
2010	19,708	48.0%
2022	22,006	11.7%

== Media ==
In telecommunications, the city was served by Telecomunicações de São Paulo. In July 1998, this company was acquired by Telefónica, which adopted the Vivo brand in 2012. The company is currently an operator of cell phones, fixed lines, internet (fiber optics/4G) and television (satellite and cable).

== See also ==
- List of municipalities in São Paulo
