= Diocese of São Miguel Paulista =

Latin Catholic ecclesiastical territory in Brazil

Diocese of São Miguel Paulista Dioecesis Sancti Michaëlis Paulinensis

Catholic
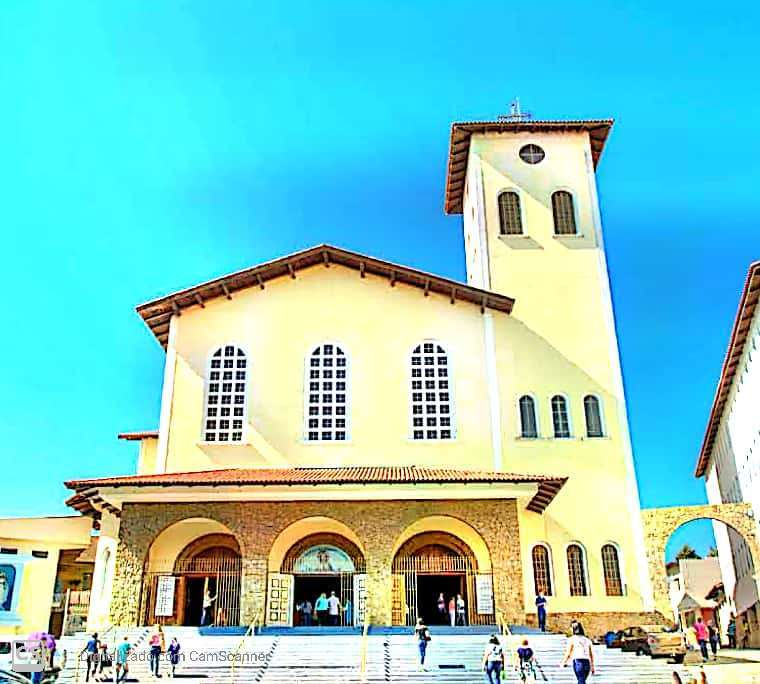
- Catedral São Miguel Arcanjo

Location
- Country: Brazil
- Ecclesiastical province: São Paulo

Statistics
- Area: 196 km^{2} (76 sq mi)
- Population: Total; Catholics: (as of 2004); 2,648,534; 2,198,284 (83.0%)

Information
- Denomination: Catholic Church
- Sui iuris church: Latin Church
- Rite: Roman Rite
- Established: 15 March 1989 (37 years ago)
- Cathedral: Catedral São Miguel Arcanjo

Current leadership
- Pope: Leo XIV
- Bishop: Algacir Munhak, C.S.
- Metropolitan Archbishop: Odilo Scherer
- Auxiliary Bishops: Sílvio Pereira Castro
- Bishops emeritus: Manuel Parrado Carral

Website
- www.diocesesaomiguel.org.br

The Diocese of São Miguel Paulista (Latin: Dioecesis Sancti Michaëlis Paulinensis) is a Latin Church ecclesiastical jurisdiction or diocese of the Catholic Church in Brazil. Its episcopal see is São Miguel Paulista, in the city of São Paulo. The diocese is a suffragan in the ecclesiastical province of the metropolitan Archdiocese of São Paulo.

== History ==
- 15 March 1989: Established as Diocese of São Miguel Paulista from the Metropolitan Archdiocese of São Paulo

== Bishops ==
- Bishops of São Miguel Paulista
  - Bishop Fernando Legal, S.D.B. (1989.03.15 – 2008.01.09)
  - Bishop Manuel Parrado Carral (2008.01.09 – 2022.09.21)
  - Bishop Algacir Munhak, C.S. (2022.09.21 – present)

=== Other priest of this diocese who became bishop ===
- José María Libório Camino Saracho, appointed Bishop of Presidente Prudente, São Paulo in 2002
