= Paulo Sérgio Machado =

Brazilian Roman Catholic prelate (1945–2024)

His Excellency Paulo Sérgio Machado
- Bishop Emeritus of São Carlos
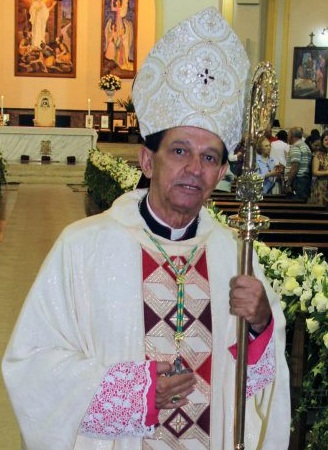
- Machado in 2012
- Metropolis: Campinas
- Installed: 1 July 1989
- Term ended: 16 December 2015
- Predecessor: Joviano de Lima Júnior
- Successor: Paulo Cezar Costa
- Previous post: Bishop of Ituiutaba (1989–2006)

Orders
- Ordination: 8 April 1972
- Consecration: 24 September 1989 by Carlo Furno

Personal details
- Born: 22 November 1945 Patrocínio, Minas Gerais, Brazil
- Died: 18 October 2024 (aged 78) Patrocínio, Minas Gerais, Brazil
- Motto: Opus solidarietatis pax (The peace is fruit of solidarity)

Paulo Sérgio Machado (22 November 1945 – 18 October 2024) was a Brazilian Roman Catholic prelate. He was appointed bishop of Ituiutaba from 1989 to 2006 and bishop of São Carlos from 2006 to 2015. He died in Patrocínio on 18 October 2024, at the age of 78.

Catholic Church titles
Preceded by Joviano de Lima Júnior	Bishop of São Carlos; 2006–2015	Succeeded by Paulo Cezar Costa
Preceded by Aloísio Roque Oppermann	Bishop of Ituiutaba; 1989–2006	Succeeded by Francisco Carlos da Silva
