= Francisco Carlos da Silva =

Brazilian Roman Catholic prelate (born 1955)

His Excellency Francisco Carlos da Silva
- Bishop of Jaú
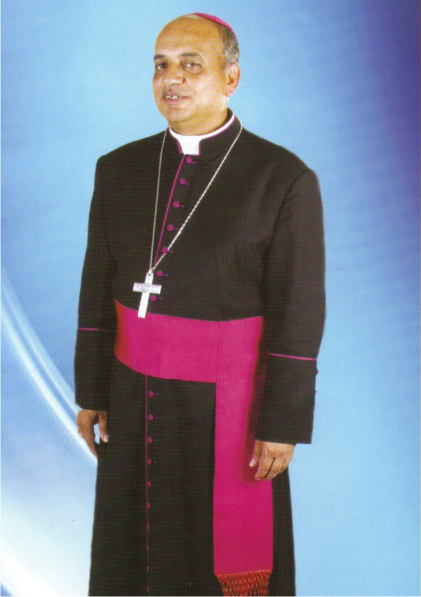
- Silva in 2012
- Metropolis: Campinas
- Appointed: 26 June 2024
- Installed: 7 September 2024
- Previous posts: Bishop of Ituiutaba (2007–2015); Bishop of Lins (2015–2024)

Orders
- Ordination: 11 December 1982 by Constantino Amstalden
- Consecration: 22 September 2007 by Joviano de Lima Júnior

Personal details
- Born: 30 September 1955 (age 70) Tabatinga, São Paulo, Brazil
- Motto: Ite in vineam (Go into the vineyard)
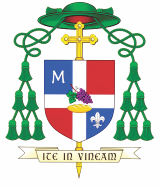
- Coat of arms

Francisco Carlos da Silva (born 30 September 1955) is a Brazilian Roman Catholic prelate. He is the inaugural bishop of Jaú since 2024. He was also bishop of Ituiutaba from 2007 to 2015 and bishop of Lins from 2015 to 2024.

== Early life and education ==
Silva attended the Grupo Escolar Professor Paulista and the Escola Estadual Abdalla Miguel in Tabatinga. From 1976 to 1978, he studied philosophy at the seminary in São Carlos, and from 1979 to 1982, he studied Catholic theology at the Pontifical Catholic University of Campinas. During his studies in Campinas, he was an alumnus of the Paulo VI Seminary. He was ordained a deacon on 2 January 1982, and received the sacrament of priestly ordination for the Diocese of São Carlos on December 11 of the same year in Tabatinga from the Coadjutor Bishop of São Carlos, Constantino Amstalden.

== Priesthood ==
After his ordination to the priesthood, Silva initially served as a parish vicar at the Cathedral of São Carlos Borromeu in São Carlos and at the parish of Divino Espirito Santo in Itápolis, before becoming parish administrator in 1983 and later parish priest of São Sebastião in Itaju. From 1984, he was parish priest of São Sebastião in Borborema. There, he coordinated the construction of the new parish church as well as the chapels of São Benedito (1991), Nossa Senhora Aparecida (1992) in the Vila Hermes district, and Santa Edwiges (1996) in the Vila Cristina district. He also had a catechesis center built and the parish printing and publishing house renovated. Furthermore, at his initiative, the first Vincentian Conference was founded in the parish in September 1986.

In addition to his work in parish ministry, Silva was responsible for youth ministry in the Diocese of São Carlos from 1985 to 1986. Furthermore, from 1997 to 2000, he coordinated pastoral care in Region IV of the diocese and at the diocesan level. From 1999 to 2002, Silva also served as Vicar General. From 2005, he served as Episcopal Vicar of Region IV of the Diocese of São Carlos. Moreover, he was a member of the Diocesan Council of Priests, the Episcopal Council, the Diocesan Pastoral Council, and the College of Consultors from 1999 onwards, as well as the Diocesan Commission for Cultural Heritage from 2002 to 2006, and the Organizing Committee for the Centenary Celebration of the Diocese of São Carlos from 2007 onwards. Furthermore, from 2002 he was also a canon and dean of the cathedral chapter of São Carlos Borromeu in São Carlos, as well as director of the diocesan archives. In addition, Silva served as diocesan administrator of the Diocese of São Carlos during the vacancy of the see from 5 June 2006 to 26 January 2007.

== Bishop ==
Silva was appointed by Pope Benedict XVI as Bishop of Ituiutaba on 19 September 2007. The Archbishop of Ribeirão Preto, Joviano de Lima Júnior SSS, consecrated him bishop on 22 November of the same year in the parish church of São Sebastião in Borborema; the co-consecrators were Paulo Sérgio Machado, Bishop of São Carlos, and Bruno Gamberini, Archbishop of Campinas. Silva's episcopal motto, Ite in vineam ("Go into the vineyard"), is taken from Matthew 20:7. He was installed on 13 December 2007. During his time as Bishop of Ituiutaba, Silva was a member of the Commission for Charity, Justice, and Peace within the Brazilian Episcopal Conference. Furthermore, he was a deputy member of the Standing Council of the Episcopal Conference for the Leste 2 region. He also chaired the Finance Committee of the Leste 2 region.

Silva was appointed by Pope Francis as Bishop of Lins on 30 September 2015. He was installed on 27 November of the same year. Under Silva's leadership, the first diocesan synod of the Diocese of Lins was held. Furthermore, at his initiative, the diocesan pastoral center and the bishop's residence were renovated, and a new building was constructed for the diocesan curia. He also reorganized the diocese's finances and introduced transparency criteria in financial management. In addition, as Bishop of Lins, he was responsible for the fasting ministry in the Sul 1 region of the Brazilian Episcopal Conference.

On 26 June 2024, Silva was appointed by Pope Francis as the first bishop of the newly established Diocese of Jaú. He was installed on 7 September of the same year.
