= Diocese of Jaú =

Catholic ecclesiastical territory

Diocese of Jaú Dioecesis Iauensis Diocese de Jaú
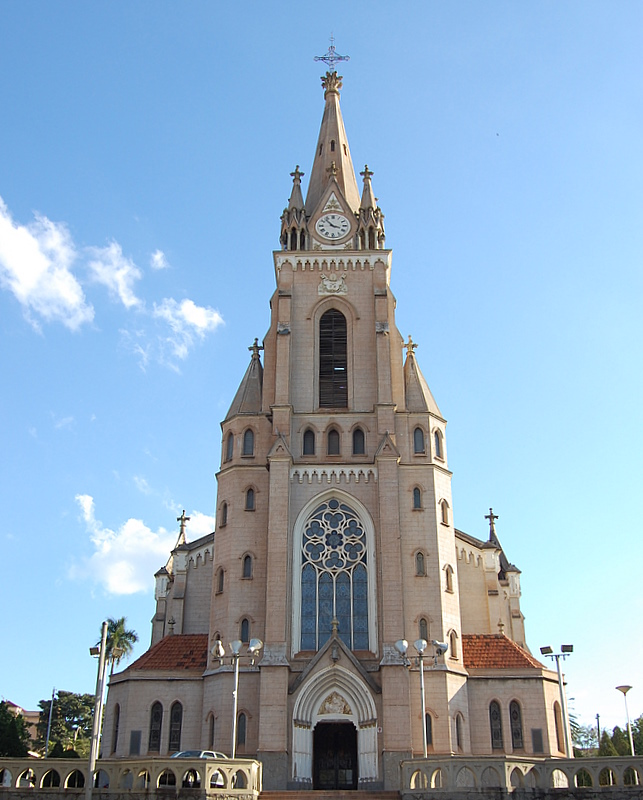
- Cathedral

Location
- Country: Brazil
- Ecclesiastical province: Campinas
- Metropolitan: Campinas

Statistics
- Area: 6,018 km^{2} (2,324 sq mi)
- Population: Total; Catholics: (as of 2024); 434,783; 311,096 (71.6%)

Information
- Rite: Latin Rite
- Established: 26 June 2024 (1 years ago)
- Cathedral: Jaú Cathedral in Jaú

Current leadership
- Pope: Leo XIV
- Bishop: Francisco Carlos da Silva (appointed)
- Metropolitan Archbishop: João Inácio Müller, OFM

Map
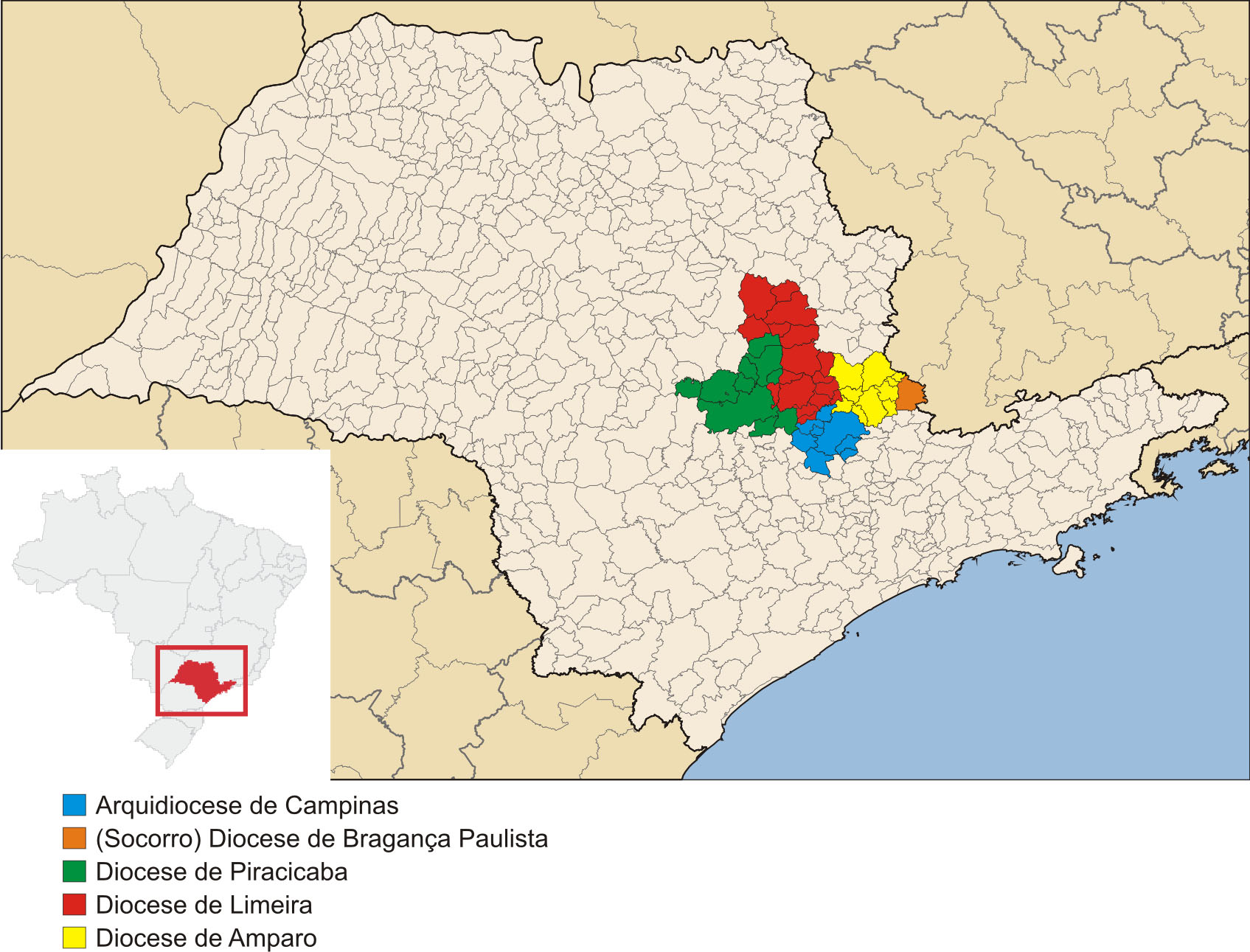

The Roman Catholic Diocese of Jaú (Latin: Dioecesis Iauensis) is a diocese located in the city of Jaú in the ecclesiastical province of Campinas in Brazil. The episcopal seat is Jaú, where the cathedral of Our Lady of Patronage is located.

== History ==
The diocese was of Jaú established on 26 June 2024 by Pope Francis, having split it from the territory of the diocese of São Carlos, being a suffragan of the Archdiocese of Campinas. Francisco Carlos da Silva was appointed as the new bishop of the new diocese.

== Territory ==
The diocese comprises the municipalities of Jaú, Bariri, Barra Bonita, Bocaina, Borborema, Brotas, Dois Córregos, Ibitinga, Itaju, Itápolis, Itapuí, Mineiros do Tietê, Nova Europa, Tabatinga and Torrinha, all in the state of São Paulo.

The diocese is part of Regional South 1 of the Episcopal Conference of Brazil.

=== Parishes ===
The Diocese of Jaú consists of 15 municipalities and has 47 parishes and 1 monastery, served by 67 priests, covering a population of 434,783 inhabitants, with 71.55% of this jurisdictional population baptized (311,096 Catholics) in 2024.
