= Aloysio José Leal Penna =

Aloysio José Leal Penna SJ
- Archbishop of Botucatu
- Church: Catholic Church
- Archdiocese: Archdiocese of Botucatu
- In office: 7 June 2000 – 19 November 2008
- Predecessor: Antônio Maria Mucciolo
- Successor: Maurício Grotto de Camargo
- Previous posts: Bishop of Bauru (1990-2000); Coadjutor Bishop of Bauru (1987-1990); Bishop of Paulo Afonso (1984-1987)

Orders
- Ordination: 21 December 1963
- Consecration: 22 July 1984 by Avelar Brandão Vilela

Personal details
- Born: 7 February 1933 Piquete, São Paulo, Brazil
- Died: 19 June 2012 (aged 79)

Aloysio José Leal Penna, SJ (7 February 1933 – 19 June 2012) was the Roman Catholic archbishop of the Roman Catholic Archdiocese of Botucatu, Brazil.

Penna was ordained into the priesthood in 1963, was named a bishop in 1984 and retired in 2008. Archbishop Penna died on 19 June 2012, at the age of 79
