= Water privatization in Brazil =

Water privatization in Brazil has been initiated in 1996. In 2008 private companies provided 7 million Brazilians - 4% of the urban population - in 10 of the country's 26 states with drinking water. The private sector holds 65 concession contracts in the states of São Paulo, Rio de Janeiro, Espírito Santo, Mato Grosso, Mato Grosso do Sul, Santa Catarina, Minas Gerais, Paraná, Pará and Amazonas. Private companies have committed to invest 4.5 billion reais (US$2.8 bn) in the sector. The bulk of Brazil's population receives water and sanitation services from public municipal or state-level utilities (see Water supply and sanitation in Brazil).

Water privatization in Brazil has been relatively limited compared to other infrastructure sectors (power, transport, telecommunications). Compared to other Latin American countries, it has been more stable than in Argentina and Bolivia, but also less widespread than for example in Chile. As under all concession contracts, the infrastructure itself remains public, but is being operated by the private sector. Likewise, water resources themselves remain publicly owned. Most concession contracts have been awarded by municipalities. A lack of legal clarity as to the right of state governments to also award concession contracts has thwarted some efforts at water privatization, notably in the state of Rio de Janeiro.

Privatization in Brazil has taken place without having previously developed a comprehensive regulatory regime, as it was the case in Chile. The impact of water privatization on access, investment, service quality, water use, tariffs and efficiency has been assessed in a 2008 study with the support from various Brazilian stakeholders as part of a global multistakeholder dialogue on water and the private sector.

== History ==
=== 19th century ===
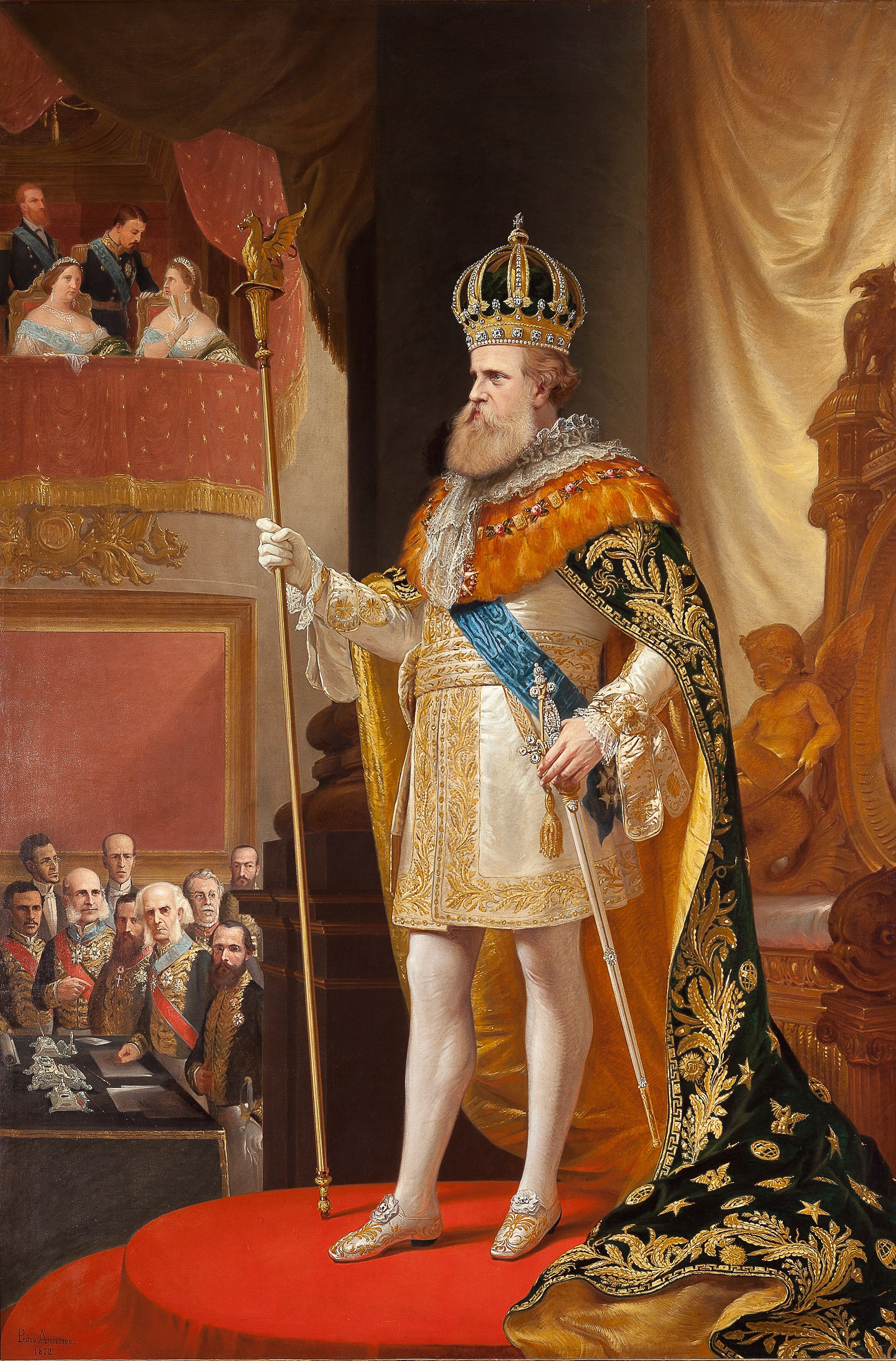
Pedro II, the last Emperor of Brazil, and ruler during the first privatization efforts

The first water privatizations in Brazil took place with English capital in Rio de Janeiro (1857) and São Paulo (1877) at the time of the post-colonial Empire under Pedro II of Brazil. Two decades later Campanhia Cantareira's services In São Paulo were deemed unsatisfactory and its contract was not renewed. Rio de Janeiro's services were similarly re-municipalized a few years later following "popular uprising."

=== 1990s ===
Privatization in Brazil was initiated under President Collor, through the Programa Nacional de Desestatização created in April 1990. In infrastructure, a major privatization program was initiated only in 1994, covering energy, transport, water supply and sanitation and telecommunications.

Between 1994 and 2000 a total of 38 private sector contracts (concessions, BOTs and service contracts) were signed, with investment commitments of more than US$2.5 billion. The nine first private concession agreements were in 1994-96 were all in the state of Sào Paulo (Limeira, Mairinque, Marília, Mineiros do Tietê, Ourinhos, Pereiras, São Carlos, Salto and Tuiuti).

To support the privatization effort, in 1997 the Workers Compensation Fund FGTS approved the use of 10% of the funds allocated for the Pró-Saneamento program to be directed towards privatization. In the same year, the Caixa Economica Federal, which was a main source of funding for water and sanitation, established a Special Water Works Concession Bureau (Eesan) to support private concessions. International financial institutions such as the World Bank supported private sector participation. For example, according to Miranda, following an unsuccessful 1999 attempt to privatize Compesa, the state water company of Pernambuco, it became extremely difficult to craft an acceptable loan proposal sans privatization.

In 1999, Brazil was viewed as "one of the world's largest concentrations of water and wastewater privatisation opportunities"; Thames Water opened an office in Rio de Janeiro and Azurix purchased AMX Acqua Management Inc. in order to get a "foot in the door."

However, the jurisdictional conflicts characterizing the regulatory environment in the water and sanitation sector complicated privatization efforts. For example, attempts to encourage private sector participation at the state level (in Bahia and Rio de Janeiro) have been challenged in the Supreme Federal Court by municipal governments. According to McNallen Brazil's system of civil law, with its limited adherence to precedent, is another obstacle to further privatization. It also affected concessions, planned for Espírito Santo and Petrolina. According to a report by Business News America, between 2002 and January 2007, no private sanitation contracts were signed. In part due to this legal uncertainty, a mayoral initiative to cancel a 40% tariff increase in Limeira requested by the concessionaire Suez was upheld by a federal court. The specific Brazilian context of water governance has produced "unprecedented wrangling" between national, state, and municipal officials.

As of 2000 only 1% municipalities had issued concession agreements to private companies. 71% of Brazil's municipalities delegated water and sewage services to state companies and 28% retained municipal provision.

=== 2000s ===
A bill (Bill 4147/2001) which would have granted states the conceding authority for metropolitan areas failed to be passed due to opposition from trade groups. The primary controversy over the bill was about the interpretation of the Federal Constitution. But the discourse was also infused with rhetoric of the private sector as "inherently abusive in setting rates and unable or unwilling to invest to serve poorer areas adequately." Finally another bill (Bill 5296/2005) was passed that clarified the role of the federal government in the sector, but failed to clarify the respective roles of states and municipalities. The law became effective in January 2007 as the sanitation law (law 11.445). Subsequently, seven new contracts for public-private partnerships (PPPs) were signed in 2007 alone, with Abcon expecting 15-20 more in 2008.

The sanitation law allows service contracts without launching a bidding process. It is being challenged by Brazil's Attorney General Antonio Fernando Souza, who is seeking an injunction from the Supreme Federal Court.

=== 2010s ===
After the period of economic crisis and political instability that culminated in the impeachment of Dilma Rousseff and the assumption of office by Michel Temer, as part of political and economic opening reforms, the process of creating the Legal Framework for Basic Sanitation began in 2018 and continued during the government of Jair Bolsonaro, with the aim of modernizing, regionalizing, and attracting private investments to the sector. At least four legislative projects were presented, including two Provisional Measures, which expired due to lack of political convergence.

In mid-2019, Senate Bill 3,261/2019, proposed by Senator Tasso Jereissati, was introduced, but the Executive Branch also presented another bill (Bill 4,162/2019) with similar content to expedite the process. During the bill's passage in the Chamber of Deputies, lawmakers from the Northeastern states also resisted the elimination of "program contracts". The turnaround occurred when Congress extended the deadline for the renewal of these contracts without bidding until March 2022, gaining the support of the Northeastern lawmakers for the bill.

=== 2020s ===
The Legal Framework for Basic Sanitation (Law No. 14.026/2020) was approved in July 2020 and sanctioned with vetoes by President Bolsonaro.

With the regulatory standardization of the sector through national reference norms, local, regional, or state regulatory agencies must follow a standard established by the Agência Nacional de Água e Saneamento Básico (ANA) to increase legal certainty in the provision of services and encourage public and private investments. However, this requires institutional capacity, human resources, and financial resources from ANA, which has not yet been able to significantly expand its workforce or budget. The universalization targets were set to achieve coverage of 99% of the population with drinking water and 90% of the population with sewage collection and treatment by December 31, 2033.

Auctioned for R$22.7 billion in April 2021, the Companhia Estadual de Águas e Esgotos do Rio de Janeiro - CEDAE is no longer responsible for water distribution in Rio de Janeiro, with the companies Aegea Saneamento and Iguá Saneamento taking over water and sewage services in regions of the state for the next 35 years. However, there was lack of interest from concessionaires in one of the auction blocks, and after deliberations, Águas do Brasil acquired the west zone of Rio de Janeiro for R$2.2 billion.

CEDAE will continue to exist and will be responsible for water capture and sale to the concessionaires.

In April 2023, President Lula signed two decrees that revoked the 25% limit for subdelegations in Public-Private Partnerships and extended the deadline for municipalities to structure their regionalized operations until the end of 2025. ABCON, the entity of private companies, criticized the decrees, while AESBE, the entity of state-owned companies, celebrated them. Some companies, such as Sabesp, Copasa, and CORSAN, requested disaffiliation from the entity in response to the decrees.

== Results ==
So far no comprehensive study has assessed the results of private sector participation in water supply and sanitation in Brazil. Such a study is, however, currently underway with support from various Brazilian stakeholders as part of a global multistakeholder dialogue on water and the private sector. The study attempts to assess private sector participation using the following criteria:

- improvements in operational performance
- improvements in financial performance
- increase in sector investments

In the absence of a completed comprehensive study this article draws on partial data and case studies quoted in the literature. The criteria used are increase in investment, increase in access, changes in efficiency, impact on water demand and health impacts.

=== Investment ===
Water and sanitation investment by public and private utilities has dropped by an average of 30% since 1998. Projections of future capital requirements vary. One source estimates a minimum need of US$60 billion over the next 20 years.

One justification for privatization has been that it would increase investments. For example, the Brazilian Association of Private Water and Sewage Operations (ABCON) promotes privatization primarily by arguing that it is the only way to acquire necessary infrastructure investments. Between 1990 and 2006, the Brazilian water and sewage sector produced 52 private projects, received US$3.069 billion in private capital.

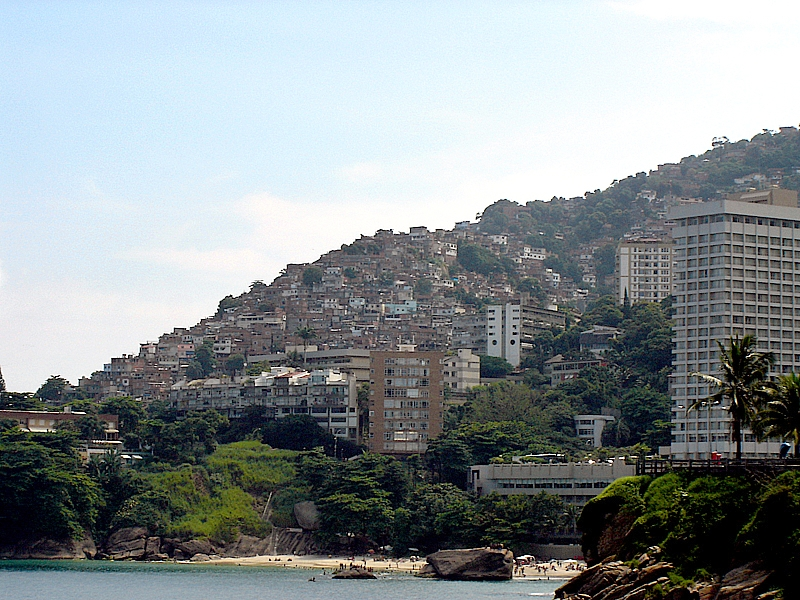
Favelas in Rio de Janeiro.

In some concessions, actual investments remained below investment commitments, such as in concessions in Limeira, Manaus, Campo Grande. For example, in July 2000, Campo Grande, the capital of the Mato Grosso do Sul state granted a 30-year, US$217 million water and sewage concession to Aguas de Barcelona, a subsidiary of Suez-Lyonnaise des Eaux; by November 2001, planned investment was reduced 27.1% from the amount pledged.

=== Access ===
One justification for privatization has been that it would accelerate the increase of access to water and sanitation, in particular the poor. However, according to McNallen and Olivier, private cherry picking has had deleterious effects on the cross-subsidization which has made possible even the moderate provision of water and sanitation services to such users. According to the think tank PSIRU—which is financed by Public Services International, a global federation of public sector trade unions—in Manaus, Suez-Lyonnaise des Eaux backtracked on promises to expand access to 95% of the population immediately after receiving a 30-year concession in June 2000.

=== Efficiency ===
There has apparently been no study analyzing changes in efficiency of privatized utilities in Brazil. However, Motta and Moreira have compared the efficiency of public and private utilities in Brazil at one point in time. Their cross-sectional statistical study examined the relative technical efficiency of public and private water companies in Brazil reveal that utilities with private sector participation are not much more efficient than public utilities. Faria speculates that the relatively low difference in efficiency in comparison to private sector participation in other countries can perhaps be explained by the relative weakness of the Brazilian regulatory regime. Public and private local operators also apparently face similar firm-specific costs. The differences between which are swamped by the stark difference between state and municipal firms. Ayres concludes that privatization is not a sufficient condition to improve efficiency, unless coupled with regulation to curtain anti-competitive practices and additional government stabilization.

=== Impact on water use ===
Water tariff increases have occurred throughout Brazil in both public and private utilities, contributing to a decrease in water use.

According to Olivier, a 2004 tariff increase in the Manaus municipal water network by Aguas do Amazonas—a private operator and subsidiary of Suez Environment, which acquired a 30-year concession in June 2000—resulted in a substantial reduction in consumption, even steeper among low income users. According to PSIRU in another case poor water users in Paraná reverted to drinking rain water and other contaminated sources as a result of tariff increases by Vivendi's subsidiary, Sanepar.

=== Health impact ===
There are no specific data on the health impact of water privatization in Brazil. According to Peres et al., privatization is likely to negatively affect the health of poorer populations if service gaps between rich and poor increase. This would contrast the experience of at least another country that has been studied in detail. According to a detailed 2002 study in Argentina, water privatization has had a positive impact on child mortality. It found that in the 1991-1997 period child mortality fell 5 to 7 percent more in areas that privatized compared to those that remained under public or cooperative management. It also found that the effect was largest in poorest areas (24%). The authors estimate that the main reason is the massive expansion of access to water, which was concentrated in poorer areas that did not receive services before private sector participation was introduced.

== List of concession agreements ==
Brazilian municipality or state	MNC	Concession	Year	Notes
Araçatuba (city)		Aracatuba Saneamento	1998	R$11.6 million investment to build, rehabilitate, operate, and transfer a potable water and sewerage treatment plant
Campo Grande, Mato Grosso	Suez (Aguas de Barcelona subsidiary)/Agbar	Aguas Guariroba (originally Interagua, spun off from state company, Sanesul)	2000	30-year, US$217 million water and sewage concession; Posted an immediate R$1.46 million loss and began operating a 20% monthly deficit after winning a 30-year concession.
Cachoeiro de Itapemirim (municipality)		Aguas de Cachoeiro	1998	R$41.4 million investment to build, rehabilitate, operate, and transfer water utility with sewerage
Guariroba	Suez	Aguas Guariroba		
Juturnaiba		Aguas de Juturnaiba	1998	R$65.2 million investment to build, rehabilitate, operate, and transfer water utility with sewerage
Limeira	Suez	Aguas de Limeira	1995	R$100 million investment to rehabilitate, operate, and transfer water utility with sewerage; 30-year water/wastewater concession ($50–70MM investment)
Manaus, Amazonas	Suez	Aguas do Amazonas	2000	30-year concession; 90% of shares in state company, Manasa, for R$193 million; Loans from BNDES in 2001 (R$72 million load for both purchase and further investment)
Mairinique		Mairinque Water Company	1997	R$28.5 million investment to build, rehabilitate, operate, and transfer water utility with sewerage
Mineiros do Tietê (municipality)		Mineiros do Tiete Water Company	1995	R$2 million investment to build, rehabilitate, operate, and transfer water utility with sewerage
Marília (city)		Marilia Water Company	1997	R$3 million investment to build, rehabilitate, operate, and transfer water utility with sewerage
Ourinhos (municipality)		Ourinhos Water Service	1996	R$1.2 million investment to build, rehabilitate, operate, and transfer water utility without sewerage
Paraná (state)	Vivendi (with Brazilian Andrade Gutierrez Group)	Companhia de Saneamento do Paraná (SANEPAR)	1998	R$216.7 million investment; 2001 loans from World Bank-International Finance Corporation ($30 million investment in AGC); Problems have included: increased faecal colibacteria and algae contamination, unlicensed groundwater exploitation, and raw wastewater discharging. As a result, managing director Jean-Mari d'Aspe returned to France in December 2001 under threat of imprisonment for criminal charges from litigation brought by a local NGO, Instituto Timoneira. The Vivendi-led consortium's 30% share in Senepar bought them 59.3% of total voting power on the Board of Directors, and the right to appoint directors who oversaw a combined 87% of Sanepar's employees.
Paranaguá (city)		Paranagua Water and Wastewater System	1997	R$66 million investment to build, rehabilitate, operate, and transfer water utility with sewerage
Pereiras (municipality)		Pereiras Water Company	1994	R$1.2 million investment to build, rehabilitate, operate, and transfer water utility and sewerage infrastructure
Petrópolis (city)		Petropolis Water Company	1998	R$89 million investment to build, rehabilitate, operate, and transfer water utility and sewerage
Ribeirão Preto	Inima, subsidiary of OHL	Ambient		80% stake
Municipalities in Rio de Janeiro State (including the five municipalities of Buzios, Cabo Frio, Sao Pedro da Aldeia, Iguaba and Arraial do Cabo out of the 91 municipalities in the state of Rio de Janeiro)	Águas de Portugal	Prolagos	2000	93.5% share (sought $38.8 million from European Investment Bank in 2001 for investment)
Salto (municipality)			1996	R$364,000 investment to rehabilitate, operate, and transfer sewerage collection and treatment
São Carlos (city)		Sao Carlos Water System	1994	R$1 million investment to rehabilitate, operate, and transfer water utility without sewerage; concluded
Tangará da Serra			2001	30-year concession One city counselor was murdered on the steps of city hall on the day of a water privatization vote in which other counselor's confessed to having been bribed.
Tuiuti (municipality)		Tuiuti Water Company	1996	R$1.4 million investment to build, rehabilitate, operate, and transfer water utility with sewerage

== Opposition ==
Opposition to privatization has too often been characterized by "controversial and emotional debates," laced with "doubts, fears and prejudices" originating from generalized objections to globalization and neoliberalism. Similarly, according to Lemos and Oliveira many potentially beneficial public private partnerships (PPPs) have suffered from widespread mistrust—bred by "decades of broken promises"—and numerous "accounts of policy failure."

Many politically influential groups in Brazil harbor an "outright aversion to private capital participation" in water and other essential services. Politically, water privatization has often been conflated with conflicts over decentralization vis-à-vis the return of control from State water companies established under the military regime to re-municipalized companies. Thus, Brazilian water reform has remained "paralyzed by the controversy" because the municipal-state contest has too often been reduced to a question of which level of government should have the authority to grant concessions to private actors, rather than the authority to develop a coherent policy including both public and private elements.

Political parties that oppose privatization include the Workers' Party (PT) and the Socialism and Liberty Party (PSOL).

== Alternatives ==
Emerging Brazilian alternatives have increasingly transcended the public-private debate by focusing on stakeholder participation and institutional cooperation.

=== Participatory models ===
Public water companies in Porto Alegre and Recife have developed "people-centered, participatory models" for improving water access. This has allowed them to position themselves as more than just being anti-privatization, but to develop a constructive alternative. Porto Alegre's DMAE in particular has become known for its participatory budgeting process. According to PSIRU, this has enabled Porto Alegre to "continually fight off privatization attempts" that were allegedly supported by the Brazilian Congress as well as international donors such as the Inter-American Development Bank (IADB) to the World Bank. The participatory budgeting process — which allows any public demand to be included in the following year's budget subject only to a popular vote and evaluation for technical feasibility — has become a model for direct democracy elsewhere in Brazil, and the world.

=== Sale of shares in the stock market ===
São Paulo's state water and sewer company Sabesp, the largest water company in Latin America, has chosen a different path. Instead of awarding a private concession it has sold shares in the Brazilian stock market and even on the New York Stock Exchange. In addition, it obtained loans from the Inter-American Development Bank and the Japan Bank for International Cooperation. Rio de Janeiro's state government also plans to sell shares in its water and sewerage company, Nova Cedae, while still retaining majority control of the company, citing the example of Sabesp (four attempts to privatize the company in 1998 failed due to lack of agreement between the city and state governments). Shares of the state water and sewer companies of Minas Gerais, Copasa, and of Parana, Sanepar, are also traded on the stock exchange. In São Paulo, the state regulatory agency ARSESP, sets a rate of return for the utility - the weighted average cost of capital - which was set at 8.06% in 2011.

According to PSIRU such "civically active utilities" are alternatives to "desperation-induced privatization attempts" in Parana and Rio de Janeiro.

=== Reduction of private sector influence in existing agreements ===
In Paraná a 1998 concession agreement had given Dominó Holdings (formed by Vivendi, Brazilian bank Opportunity, and the Andrade Gutierrez group) control of the state water and sewer company SANEPAR. Recently, the Supreme Federal Court authorized the state government to increase its stake in SANEPAR, overturning an injunction granted by a lower court which had prevented the state from calling a general shareholders meeting.

== See also ==
- Water supply and sanitation in Brazil
