= Francisco José Zugliani =

Brazilian Roman Catholic bishop (born 1934)

The Most Reverend Francisco José Zugliani
- Bishop Emeritus of Amparo
- Church: Roman Catholic Church
- Diocese: Amparo
- Appointed: 23 December 1997
- Installed: 25 March 1998
- Term ended: 14 July 2010
- Predecessor: Diocese established
- Successor: Pedro Carlos Cipollini

Orders
- Ordination: 9 July 1961 by Ruy Serra
- Consecration: 18 March 1998 by Gilberto Pereira Lopes

Personal details
- Born: 1 May 1934 (age 92) Mineiros do Tietê, São Paulo, Brazil
- Parents: Ângelo Zugliani and Neide Ometto Zugliani
- Motto: Luz e Vida (Light and Life)

Francisco José Zugliani (born 1 May 1934) is a Brazilian Roman Catholic prelate who served as the first bishop of the Diocese of Amparo from 1998 until his retirement in 2010. He was appointed bishop on 23 December 1997, consecrated on 18 March 1998, and assumed leadership of the Diocese of Amparo on 25 March 1998. He is bishop emeritus of the diocese.

== Early life and education ==
Zugliani was born on 1 May 1934 in Mineiros do Tietê, in the state of São Paulo, Brazil. He was the son of Ângelo Zugliani and Neide Ometto Zugliani and the third of seven children.

== Priesthood ==
Zugliani was ordained a priest on 9 July 1961 at the Church of Nossa Senhora do Patrocínio in Jaú, São Paulo, by Bishop Ruy Serra. Following his ordination, he began his pastoral ministry in the Diocese of São Carlos, serving as a parish vicar in Itapuí.

In 1982, he became parish priest of Nossa Senhora do Patrocínio in Jaú. He remained in this position until his appointment to the episcopate in December 1997, having served in the parish for approximately fifteen years before becoming a bishop.

== Episcopate ==
On 23 December 1997, Pope John Paul II appointed Zugliani the first bishop of the newly established Diocese of Amparo. He received episcopal consecration on 18 March 1998 at the Church of Nossa Senhora do Patrocínio in Jaú. Archbishop Gilberto Pereira Lopes served as the principal consecrator, with Bishop Acácio Rodrigues Alves and Bishop José Antônio Aparecido Tosi Marques as co-consecrators.

On 25 March 1998, he formally assumed leadership of the Diocese of Amparo, on the same day that the diocese was inaugurated. His episcopal motto was Luz e Vida (Light and Life).

== Retirement ==
On 14 July 2010, Pope Benedict XVI accepted Zugliani's resignation from the pastoral governance of the Diocese of Amparo, in accordance with canon 401 §1 of the Code of Canon Law. He was succeeded by Pedro Carlos Cipollini, who was appointed bishop of Amparo on the same date.

After his retirement, Zugliani initially continued living in Amparo. In 2014, he moved to Jaú, where he had previously served as a parish priest and where several members of his family lived. A farewell Eucharistic celebration was held in Amparo on 17 July 2014.

As bishop emeritus, he continued his involvement in the Catholic Church's pastoral activities and served as an assistant bishop of the Health Pastoral Commission of the Southern Regional 1 of the National Conference of Bishops of Brazil (CNBB).

In July 2021, the Diocese of São Carlos commemorated the 60th anniversary of his priestly ordination with a thanksgiving Mass at the parish of Nossa Senhora de Fátima in Jaú.

Catholic Church titles
Preceded by Diocese established	Bishop of Amparo; 1997–2010	Succeeded by Pedro Carlos Cipollini
