= Roman Catholic Diocese of São Carlos =

Catholic ecclesiastical territory

Diocese of São Carlos Dioecesis Sancti Caroli in Brasilia Diocese de São Carlos
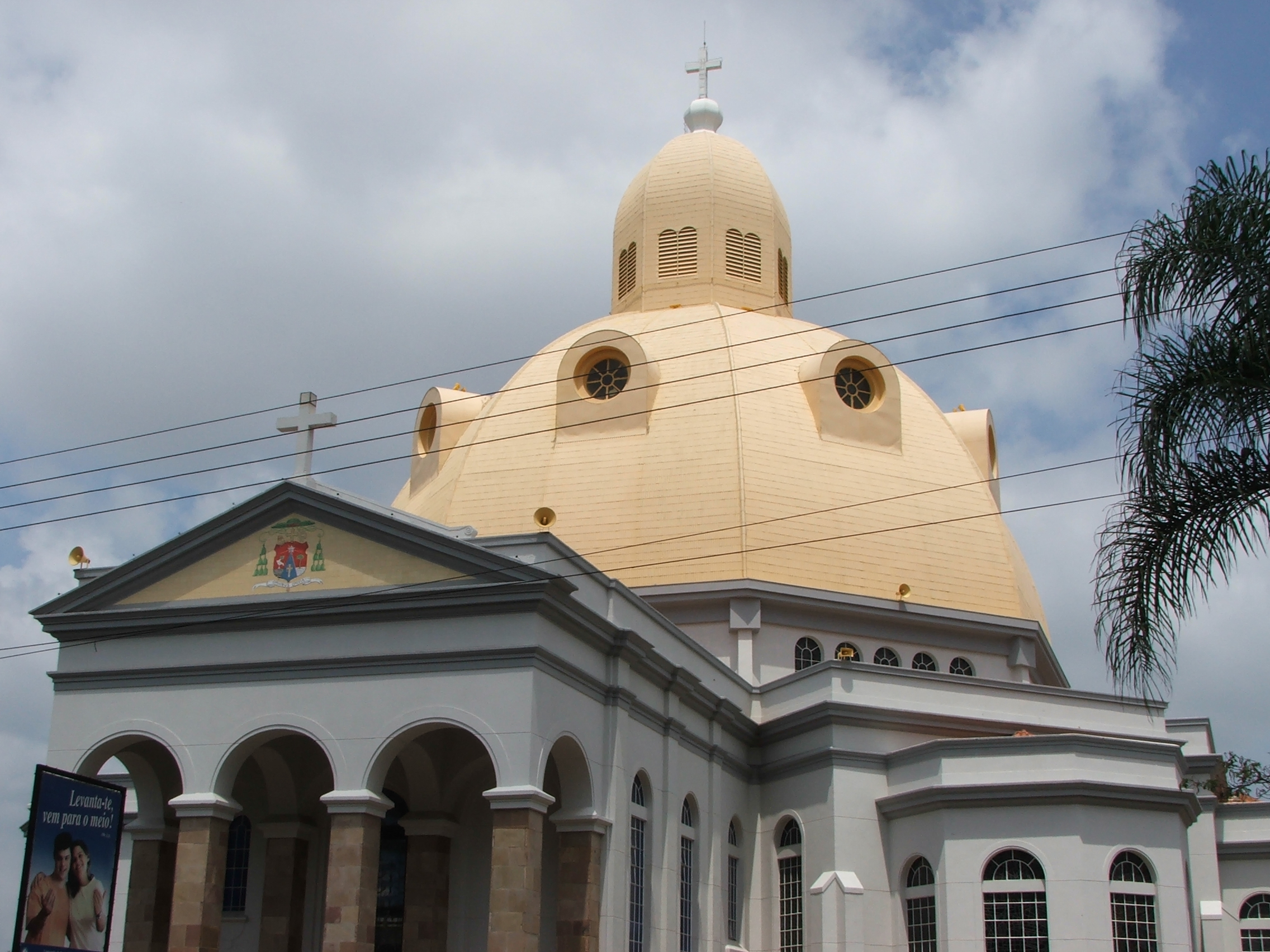
- Cathedral

Location
- Country: Brazil
- Ecclesiastical province: Campinas
- Metropolitan: Campinas

Statistics
- Area: 13,317 km^{2} (5,142 sq mi)
- Population: Total; Catholics: (as of 2010); 1,097,000; 801,000 (73%)

Information
- Rite: Latin Rite
- Established: 7 June 1908 (117 years ago)
- Cathedral: Cathedral of St Charles Borromeo in São Carlos

Current leadership
- Pope: Leo XIV
- Bishop: Luiz Carlos Dias
- Metropolitan Archbishop: João Inácio Müller, OFM

Map
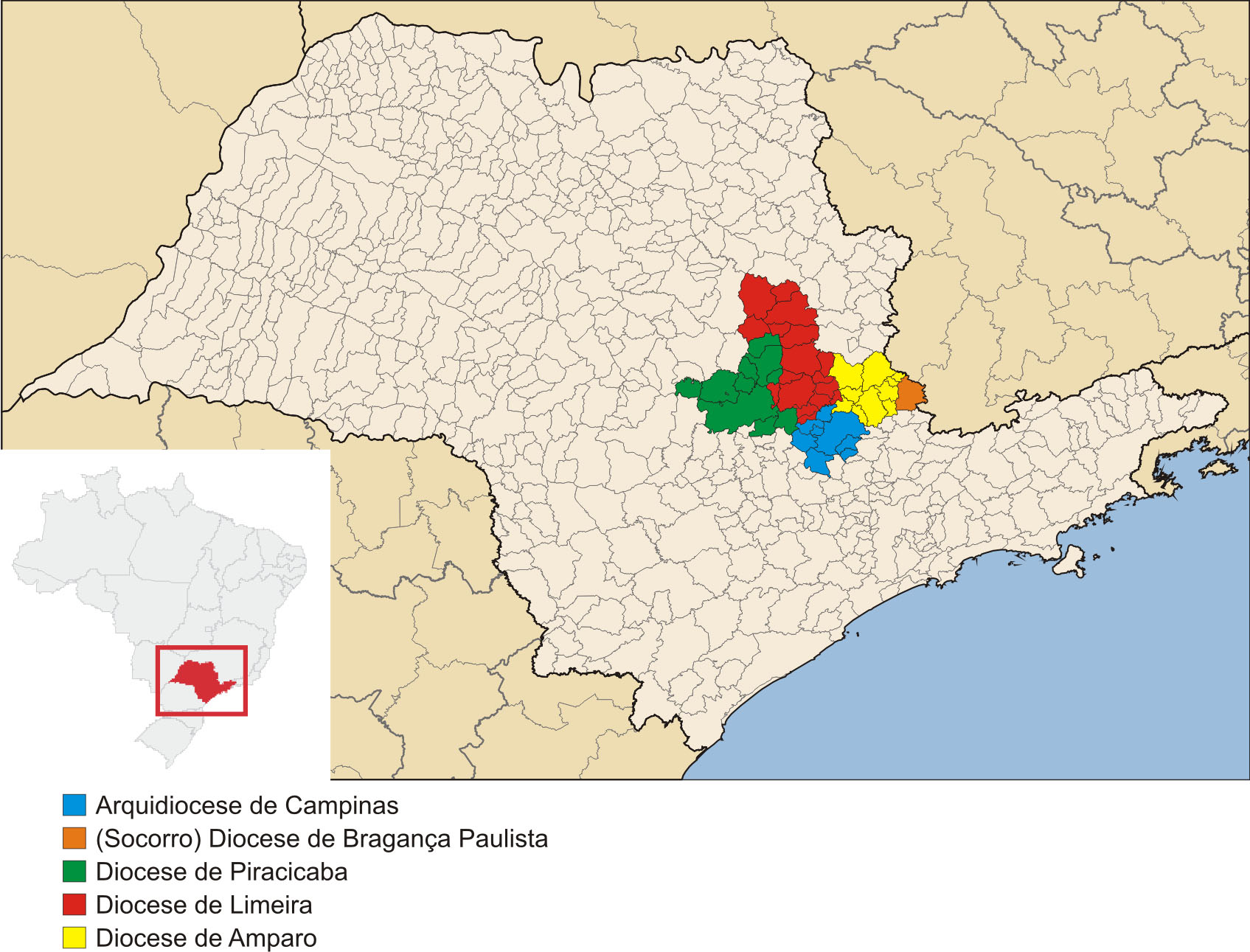

The Roman Catholic Diocese of São Carlos (Latin: Dioecesis Sancti Caroli in Brasilia) is a diocese located in the city of São Carlos in the ecclesiastical province of Campinas in Brazil.

== History ==
The diocese was established on 7 June 1908 as the Diocese of São Carlos do Pinhal from the Diocese of São Paulo. On 25 November 1957, it was renamed as Diocese of São Carlos. On 26 June 2024, the Diocese of Jaú was established from the ecclesiastical territory of São Carlos.

== Bishops ==
=== Ordinaries, in reverse chronological order ===
- Bishops of São Carlos (Roman Rite)
  - Bishop Luiz Carlos Dias (2021.10.20 – Present)
  - Bishop Paulo Cezar Costa (2016.06.22 – 2020.10.21), appointed Archbishop of Brasília, Distrito Federal
  - Bishop Paulo Sérgio Machado (2006.11.22 – 2015.12.16), resigned
  - Bishop Joviano de Lima Júnior, S.S.S. (1995.10.25 – 2006.04.05), appointed Archbishop of Ribeirão Preto, São Paulo
  - Bishop Constantino Amstalden (1986.09.19 – 1995.10.25), retired
  - Bishop Ruy Serra (1957.11.25 – 1986.09.19)
- Bishops of São Carlos do Pinhal (Roman Rite)
  - Bishop Ruy Serra (1948.02.13 – 1957.11.25)
  - Bishop Gastão Liberal Pinto (1937.10.15 – 1945.10.24)
  - Archbishop (personal title) José Marcondes Homem de Melo (1908.08.09 – 1937.10.15)

=== Coadjutor bishops ===
- Gastão Liberal Pinto (1934-1937)
- Constantino Amstalden (1971-1986)

=== Auxiliary bishops ===
- Sérgio Aparecido Colombo (2001-2003), appointed Bishop of Paranavaí, Parana
- Eduardo Malaspina (2018-

=== Other priests of this diocese who became bishops ===
- José de Aquino Pereira, appointed Bishop of Dourados, Mato Grosso do Sul in 1958
- Rubens Augusto de Souza Espínola, appointed Auxiliary Bishop of São Luís de Montes Belos, Goias in 1980
- Virgílio de Pauli, appointed Bishop of Campo Mourão, Parana in 1981
- José Antônio Aparecido Tosi Marques, appointed Auxiliary Bishop of São Salvador da Bahia in 1991
- Bruno Gamberini, appointed Bishop of Bragança Paulista, São Paulo in 1995
- Francisco José Zugliani, appointed Bishop of Amparo, São Paulo in 1997
- Sérgio da Rocha, appointed Auxiliary Bishop of Fortaleza, Ceara in 2001; future Cardinal
- Francisco Carlos da Silva, appointed Bishop of Ituiutaba, Minas Gerais in 2007
- Luis Gonzaga Féchio, appointed Auxiliary Bishop of Belo Horizonte, Minas Gerais in 2011
- Moacir Aparecido de Freitas, appointed Bishop of Votuporanga, São Paulo in 2015
