= Diocese of Amparo =

Catholic ecclesiastical territory

Coordinates: 22.7013°S 46.7648°W

Diocese of Amparo Dioecesis Amparensis Diocese de Amparo
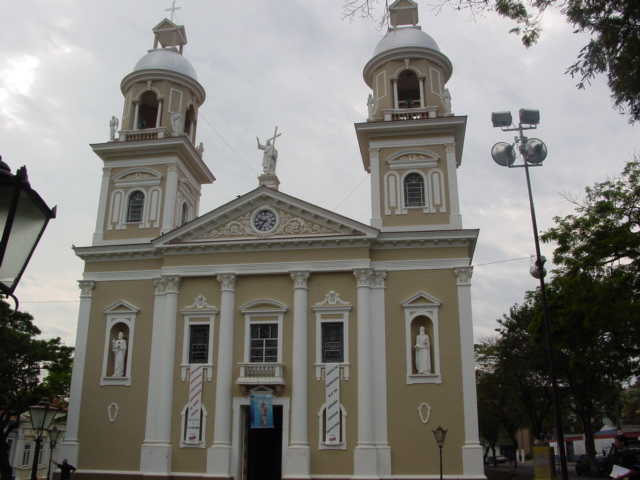
- Cathedral of Our Lady of Amparo

Location
- Country: Brazil
- Ecclesiastical province: Campinas
- Metropolitan: Campinas

Statistics
- Area: 2,084 km^{2} (805 sq mi)
- Population: Total; Catholics: (as of 2012); 376,000; 309,000 (82.2%)

Information
- Rite: Latin Rite
- Established: 23 December 1997 (28 years ago)
- Cathedral: Cathedral of Our Lady of Perpetual Help in Amparo

Current leadership
- Pope: Leo XIV
- Bishop: Luiz Gonzaga Fechio
- Metropolitan Archbishop: João Inácio Müller, O.F.M.
- Bishops emeritus: Francisco José Zugliani

Map
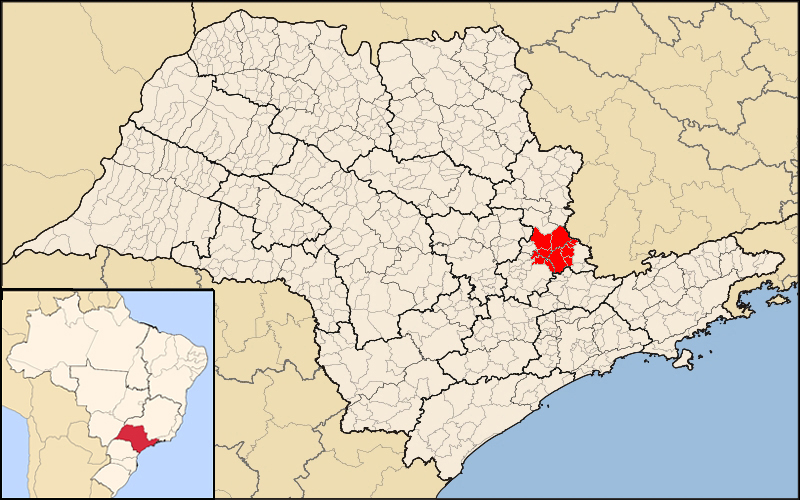

The Roman Catholic Diocese of Amparo (Latin: Dioecesis Amparensis) is a diocese located in the city of Amparo in the ecclesiastical province of Campinas in Brazil.

== History ==
- December 23, 1997: Established as Diocese of Amparo from the Metropolitan Archdiocese of Campinas and Diocese of Limeira

== Leadership ==
- Bishops of Amparo (Latin Rite)
  - Francisco José Zugliani (23 Dec 1997 – 14 Jul 2010)
  - Pedro Carlos Cipolini (14 Jul 2010 – 6 Jan 2016); formerly of the clergy of the Roman Catholic Archdiocese of Campinas, Brazil; up until now pastor of the Cathedral Basilica "Nossa Senhora de Carmo" and Professor of Theology at the Pontifical Catholic University; born in Caconde, Brazil in 1952 and ordained a priest in 1978
  - Luiz Gonzaga Fechio (6 Jan 2016–Present)
