= Vilson Dias de Oliveira =

Brazilian prelate of the Catholic Church (born 1958)

Vilson Dias de Oliveira D.C.
- Bishop Emeritus of Limeira
- Church: Catholic Church
- Diocese: Diocese of Limeira
- In office: 13 June 2007 – 17 May 2019
- Predecessor: Augusto José Zini Filho
- Successor: José Roberto Fortes Palau

Orders
- Ordination: 22 April 1984
- Consecration: 1 September 2007 by Raymundo Damasceno Assis

Personal details
- Born: 26 November 1958 (age 67) Guaíra, São Paulo, United States of Brazil
- Motto: Cristo É A Nossa Paz

Vilson Dias de Oliveira D.C. (born 26 November 1958) is a Brazilian prelate of the Catholic Church. He was Bishop of Limeira from 2007 to 2019.

== Biography ==
Vilson Dias de Oliveira was born in Guaíra in the state of São Paulo. He took vows as a member of the Christian Doctrine Fathers on 2 February 1978. After completing his studies he was ordained a priest on 22 April 1984.

He was named Bishop of Limeira on 13 June 2007 by Pope Benedict XVI. He received his episcopal consecration from Raymundo Damasceno Assis, Archbishop of Aparecida, on 1 September and was installed on 15 September.

On 17 May 2019, Pope Francis accepted his resignation as bishop and appointed an apostolic administrator to lead the diocese following the launch of a civil investigation on charges of extortion relating to the coverup of several instances of sexual abuse on the part of a priest in the diocese. Archbishop Giovanni d’Aniello, Apostolic Nuncio to Brazil, had arranged for a canonical investigation by Bishop João Inácio Müller of Lorena in February. In April Dias admitted to having stolen from Church funds for his personal use.
