= Diocese of Bragança Paulista =

Catholic ecclesiastical territory

Coordinates: 22.9525°S 46.5422°W

Diocese of Bragança Paulista Dioecesis Brigantiensis in Brasilia Diocese de Bragança Paulista

Location
- Country: Brazil
- Ecclesiastical province: Campinas
- Metropolitan: Campinas

Statistics
- Area: 4,400 km^{2} (1,700 sq mi)
- Population: Total; Catholics: (as of 2012); 1,138,000; 831,000 (73%)

Information
- Rite: Latin Rite
- Established: 24 July 1925 (100 years ago)
- Cathedral: Cathedral of the Immaculate Conception in Bragança Paulista

Current leadership
- Pope: Leo XIV
- Bishop: Sérgio Aparecido Colombo
- Metropolitan Archbishop: João Inácio Müller, OFM
- Bishops emeritus: José María Pinheiro Bishop Emeritus

Map
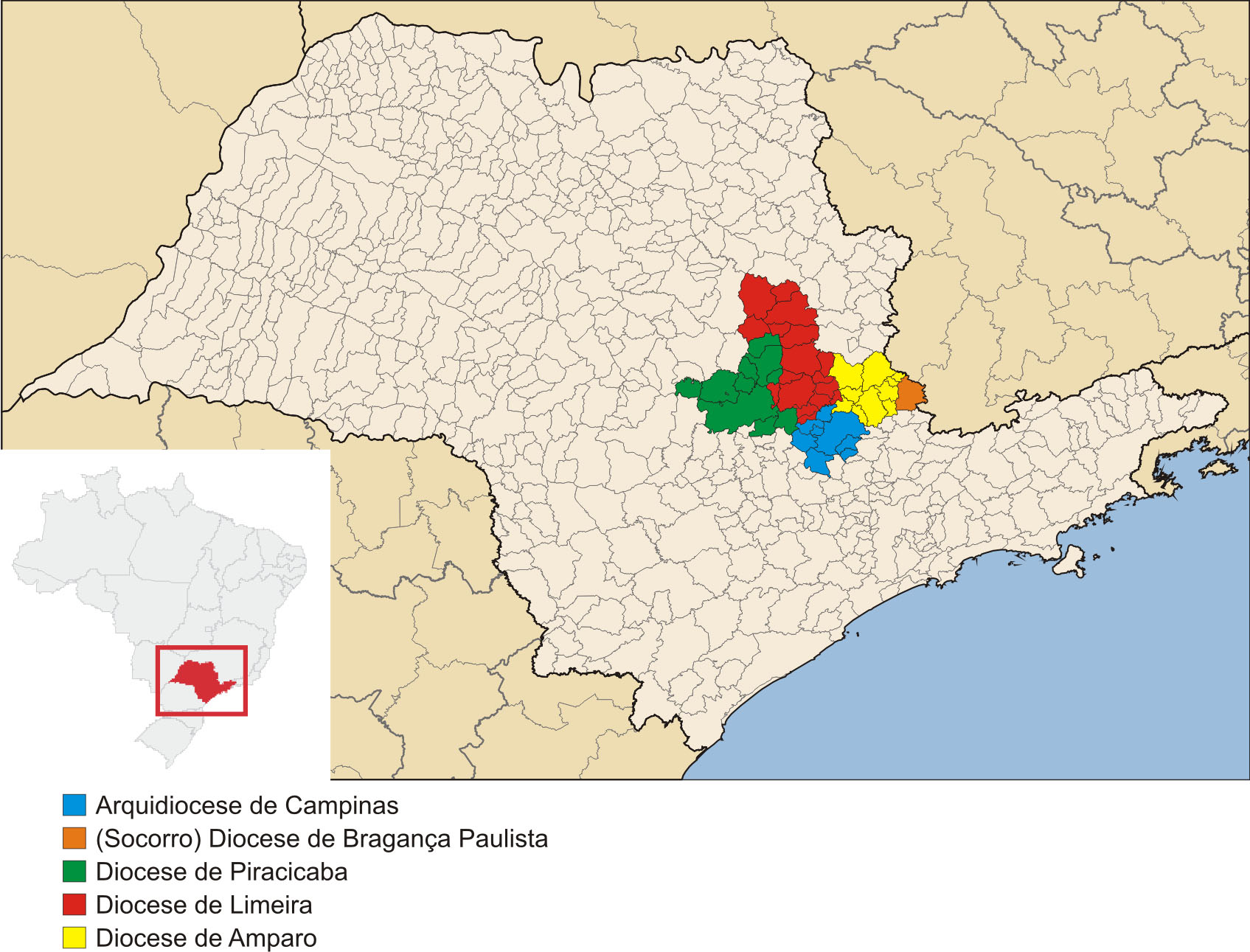

The Roman Catholic Diocese of Bragança Paulista (Latin: Dioecesis Brigantiensis in Brasilia) is a diocese located in the city of Bragança Paulista in the ecclesiastical province of Campinas in Brazil.

== History ==
- July 24, 1925: Established as Diocese of Bragança Paulista from the Diocese of Campinas and Metropolitan Archdiocese of São Paulo

== Special churches ==
- Minor Basilicas:
  - Basílica Nossa Senhora do Belém

== Bishops ==
Bishops of Bragança Paulista (Latin Rite)

- José Maurício da Rocha (1927.02.04 – 1969.11.24)
- José Lafayette Ferreira Álvares (1971.02.01 – 1976.11.10)
- Antônio Pedro Misiara (1976.10.27 – 1995.05.17)
- Bruno Gamberini (1995.05.17 – 2004.06.02), appointed Archbishop of Campinas, São Paulo
- José María Pinheiro (9 March 2005 – 16 September 2009)
- Sérgio Aparecido Colombo (16 September 2009 – present)

=== Other priest of this diocese who became bishop ===
- Jeremias Antônio de Jesus, appointed Bishop of Guanhães, Minas Gerais in 2012
