= Diocese of Marília =

Ecclesiastical territory in Botucatu, Brazil

Diocese of Marília Dioecesis Mariliensis Diocese de Marília
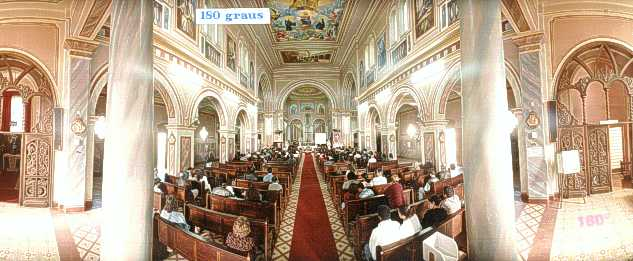
- Cathedral interior

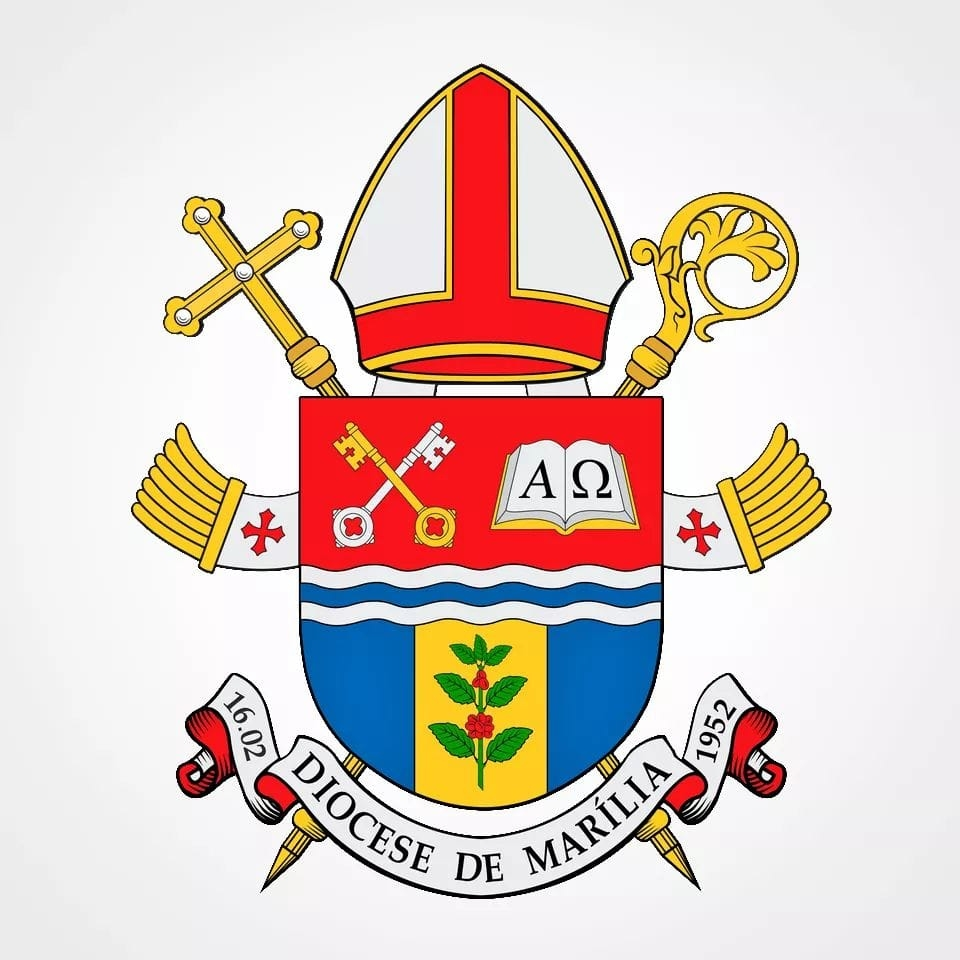
- Coat of arms

Location
- Country: Brazil
- Ecclesiastical province: Botucatu
- Metropolitan: Botucatu

Statistics
- Area: 11,943 km^{2} (4,611 sq mi)
- Population: Total; Catholics: (as of 2004); 652,850; 522,000 (80.0%)

Information
- Rite: Latin Rite
- Established: 16 February 1952 (73 years ago)
- Cathedral: Cathedral Basilica of St Benedict in Marília

Current leadership
- Pope: Leo XIV
- Bishop: Luiz Antônio Cipolini
- Metropolitan Archbishop: Maurício Grotto de Camargo
- Bishops emeritus: Osvaldo Giuntini Bishop Emeritus

Website
- www.diocesedemarilia.org.br

The Roman Catholic Diocese of Marília (Latin: Dioecesis Mariliensis) is a diocese located in the city of Marília in the ecclesiastical province of Botucatu in Brazil.

== History ==
- February 16, 1952: Established as Diocese of Marília from the Diocese of Lins

== Bishops ==
- Bishops of Marília (Roman rite), in reverse chronological order:
  - Bishop Luiz Antônio Cipolini (2013.05.08 - present)
  - Bishop Osvaldo Giuntini (1992.12.09 – 2013.05.08)
  - Bishop Daniel Tomasella, OFMCap (1975.04.23 – 1992.12.09)
  - Archbishop (personal title) Hugo Bressane de Araújo (1954.10.07 – 1975.04.23)

=== Coadjutor bishops ===
- Daniel Arnaldo Tomasella, OFMCap (1975)
- Osvaldo Giuntini (1987-1992)

=== Auxiliary bishops ===
- Daniel Arnaldo Tomasella, OFMCap (1969-1975), appointed Coadjutor here
- Osvaldo Giuntini (1982-1987), appointed Coadjutor here

=== Another priest of this diocese who became bishop ===
- Paulo Roberto Beloto, appointed Bishop of Formosa, Goias in 2005

== Sources ==
- GCatholic.org
- Catholic Hierarchy
- Diocese website
