= Osvaldo Giuntini =

Brazilian Roman Catholic prelate (1936–2025)

The Most Reverend Osvaldo Giuntini
- Bishop Emeritus of Marília
- Archdiocese: Botucatu
- Diocese: Marília
- Installed: December 9, 1992
- Term ended: May 8, 2013
- Predecessor: Daniel Arnaldo Tomasella
- Successor: Luiz Antônio Cipolini
- Previous posts: Auxiliary Bishop of Marília and Titular Bishop of Tunnuna (1982–1987)

Orders
- Ordination: December 8, 1963 by Antônio Maria Alves de Siqueira
- Consecration: September 12, 1982 by Roberto Pinarello de Almeida, Daniel Arnaldo Tomasella, João Bergese

Personal details
- Born: October 24, 1936 São Paulo, Brazil
- Died: December 1, 2025 (aged 89) Marília, Sao Paulo, Brazil
- Motto: Vitam meam do vobis

Osvaldo Giuntini (October 24, 1936 – December 1, 2025) was a Brazilian Roman Catholic prelate.

Giuntini was born in São Paulo on October 24, 1936.

In 1975, Pope Paul VI granted him the title of Monsignor. On June 25, 1982, Osvaldo was appointed auxiliary bishop of the Diocese of Marília and Titular Bishop of Tunnuna. On May 8, 2013, Pope Francis accepted the resignation of Osvaldo for the government of the Diocese of Marília in accordance with canon 401 § 1 of the Code of Canon Law.

Giuntini died on December 1, 2025, at the age of 89.

Catholic Church titles
Preceded by Daniel Arnaldo Tomasella	Bishop of Marília; 1992–2013	Succeeded by Luiz Antônio Cipolini
Preceded by Urbano José Allgayer	Titular Bishop of Tunnuna; 1982–1987	Succeeded by Narbal da Costa Stencel
Preceded by —	Auxiliary Bishop of Marília; 1982–1987	Succeeded by —
