= Diocese of Bauru =

Catholic ecclesiastical territory

Coordinates: 22.3223°S 49.0704°W

Diocese of Bauru Dioecesis Bauruensis Diocese de Bauru
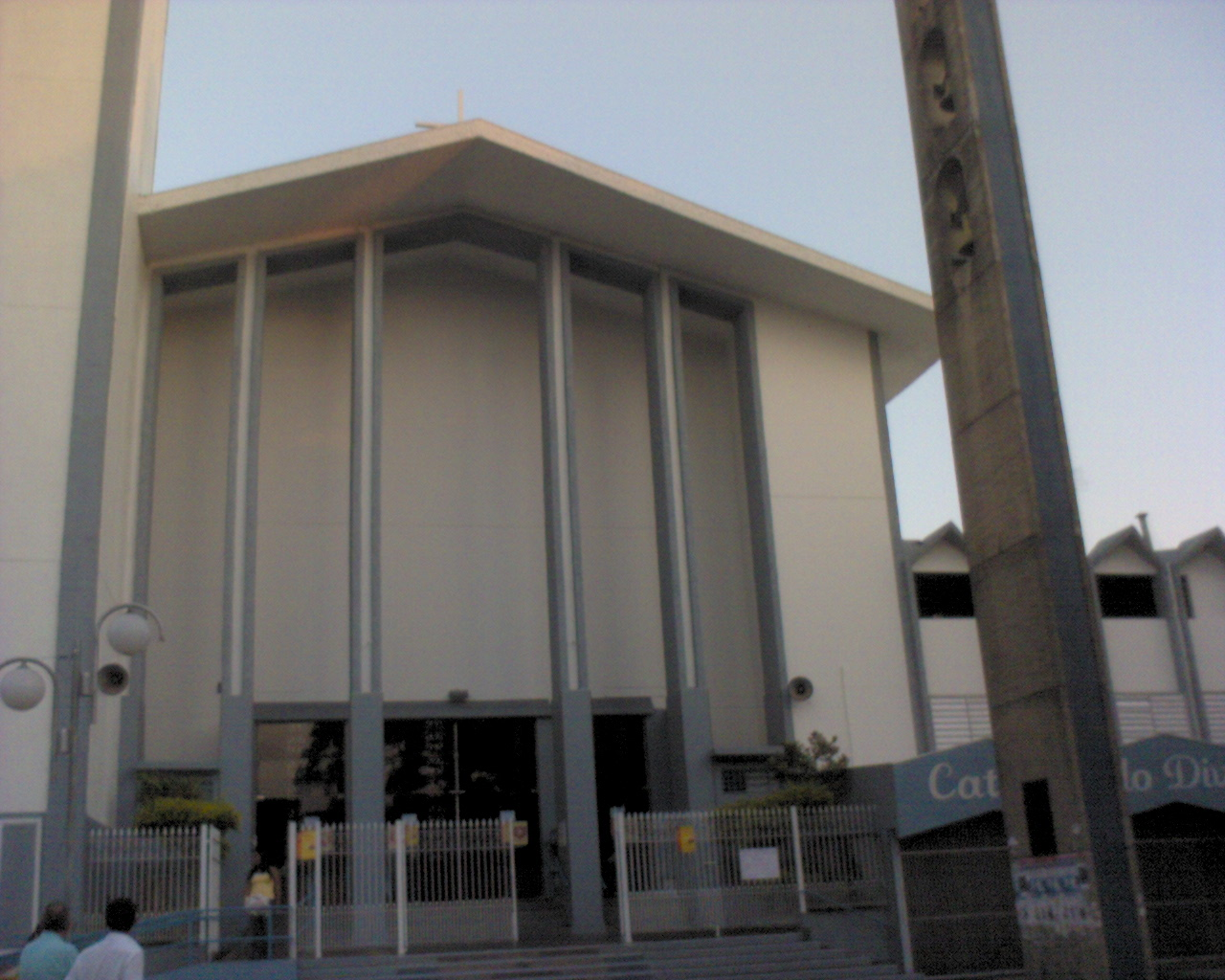
- Cathedral of the Holy Spirit

Location
- Country: Brazil
- Ecclesiastical province: Botucatu
- Metropolitan: Botucatu

Statistics
- Area: 5,892 km^{2} (2,275 sq mi)
- Population: Total; Catholics: (as of 2012); 526,000; 471,000 (89.5%)
- Parishes: 41

Information
- Rite: Latin Rite
- Established: 15 February 1964 (62 years ago)
- Cathedral: Cathedral of the Holy Spirit in Bauru

Current leadership
- Pope: Leo XIV
- Bishop: Rubens Sevilha
- Metropolitan Archbishop: Maurício Grotto de Camargo
- Bishops emeritus: Caetano Ferrari

Website
- www.bispadobauru.org.br

The Roman Catholic Diocese of Bauru (Latin: Dioecesis Bauruensis) is a diocese located in the Brazilian city of Bauru (São Paulo State) in the Ecclesiastical Province of the Roman Catholic Archdiocese of Botucatu in the city of Botucatu (also in São Paulo State).

== History ==
- February 15, 1964: Established as Diocese of Bauru from the Metropolitan Archdiocese of Botucatu and Diocese of Lins

== Bishops ==
- Bishops of Bauru (Roman rite), in reverse chronological order
  - Bishop Rubens Sevilha, O.C.D. (2018.03.28 – Present)
  - Bishop Caetano Ferrari, O.F.M. (2009.04.15 – 2018.03.28); retired
  - Bishop Luiz Antônio Guedes (2001.10.24 – 2008.07.30); transferred by Pope Benedict XVI to be Bishop of the Roman Catholic Diocese of Campo Limpo in Campo Limpo (São Paulo State)
  - Bishop Aloysio José Leal Penna, S.J. (1990.09.04 – 2000.06.07); elevated by Pope John Paul II to be Archbishop of the Roman Catholic Archdiocese of Botucatu
  - Bishop Cândido Rubens Padín, O.S.B. (1970.04.27 – 1990.09.04)
  - Bishop Vicente Ângelo José Marchetti Zioni (1964.03.25 – 1968.03.27); elevated by Pope Paul VI to be Archbishop of the Roman Catholic Archdiocese of Botucatu

=== Coadjutor bishop ===
- Aloysio José Leal Penna, S.J. (1984-1987)

=== Other priest of this diocese who became bishop ===
- Luiz Antônio Lopes Ricci, appointed Auxiliary Bishop of Niterói, Rio de Janeiro in 2017

== Sources ==
- GCatholic.org
- Catholic Hierarchy
