= Walter Bini =

Brazilian catholic bishop

Walter Bini (31 May 1930 in São Paulo – 17 June 1987 in Lins) was a Brazilian clergyman and bishop for the Roman Catholic Diocese of Lins. He was ordained in 1959. He was appointed in 1984. He retired in 1987.
