= Cândido Rubens Padín =

- Bishop of Diocese of Bauru (emeritus)
- Church: Roman Catholic Church
- See: Diocese of Bauru
- In office: 1970–1990
- Predecessor: Vicente Angelo José Marchetti Zioni
- Successor: Aloysio José Leal Penna
- Previous post(s): Priest

Orders
- Ordination: September 15, 1946

Personal details
- Born: September 5, 1915; São Carlos, Brazil
- Died: January 25, 2008 (aged 92)

Cândido Rubens Padín, OSB, (September 5 , 1915 – January 25, 2008) was a Brazilian bishop of the Roman Catholic Church.

Padín was born in São Carlos, Brazil, and was ordained a priest on July 15, 1946, from the religious order of Order of Saint Benedict. Padín was appointed Auxiliary bishop of the Archdiocese of São Sebastião do Rio de Janeiro as well as Titular Bishop Tremithus, and was ordained a bishop on August 5, 1962. On January 5, 1966, Padín was appointed bishop of the Diocese of Lorena. His last appointment came on April 27, 1970, to the Diocese of Bauru from which he would retire on September 4, 1990.

Padín died on January 25, 2008, at age of 92.

== See also ==
- Order of Saint Benedict
- Archdiocese of São Sebastião do Rio de Janeiro
- Diocese of Bauru
- Diocese of Lorena
