= Sérgio Aparecido Colombo =

Brazilian Catholic bishop

- Bishop of Bragança Paulista
- Church: Catholic Church
- Diocese: Diocese of Bragança Paulista
- Appointed: 16 September 2009
- Predecessor: José Maria Pinheiro
- Previous posts: Bishop of Paranavaí (2003-2009); Auxiliary Bishop of São Carlos (2001-2003); Titular Bishop of Pudentiana (2001-2003)

Orders
- Ordination: 6 August 1980
- Consecration: 6 January 2002 by Ercílio Turco

Personal details
- Born: 29 August 1954 (age 71) Cajobi, São Paulo, United States of Brazil
- Coat of arms

Sérgio Aparecido Colombo (29 August 1954) is a Brazilian prelate of the Catholic Church who has been Bishop of Bragança Paulista since 2009. He was an auxiliary bishop in São Carlos from 2002 to 2003 and Bishop of Paranavaí from 2004 to 2009.

== Biography ==
Sérgio Aparecido Colombo was born on 29 August 1954 in Cajobi, State of São Paulo, Brazil. He studied philosophy in São Paulo (1974–1976) and theology at the Theological Faculty Nossa Senhora da Assunção there (1977–1980). He was ordained a priest of the Diocese of Limeira on 6 August 1980.

He was pastor of Bom Jesus parish (1980–1982) in the city of Leme, pastor of the parish of São Manoel (1982–1988) also in Leme, and parish priest of "Jesus Crucificado", in the city of Iracemápolis from 1988 to 2001. From 1994 to 1996 he was spiritual director of the students of the Seminary "São João Maria Vianney". He was also Episcopal Vicar of Limeira from 1983 to 1996. From 1986 to 1990, he was the diocesan pastoral coordinator and then became Vicar General of the diocese.

On 10 October 2001, Pope John Paul II appointed him titular bishop of Pudentiana and auxiliary bishop in São Carlos. He was consecrated a bishop on 6 January 2002.

On 3 December 2003, Pope John Paul named him Bishop of Paranavaí. His installation took place on 1 February 2004.

Pope Benedict XVI appointed him Bishop of Bragança Paulista on 16 September 2009.
