= Diocese of Limeira =

Catholic ecclesiastical territory

Coordinates: 22.5618°S 47.4021°W

Diocese of Limeira Dioecesis Limeirensis Diocese de Limeira
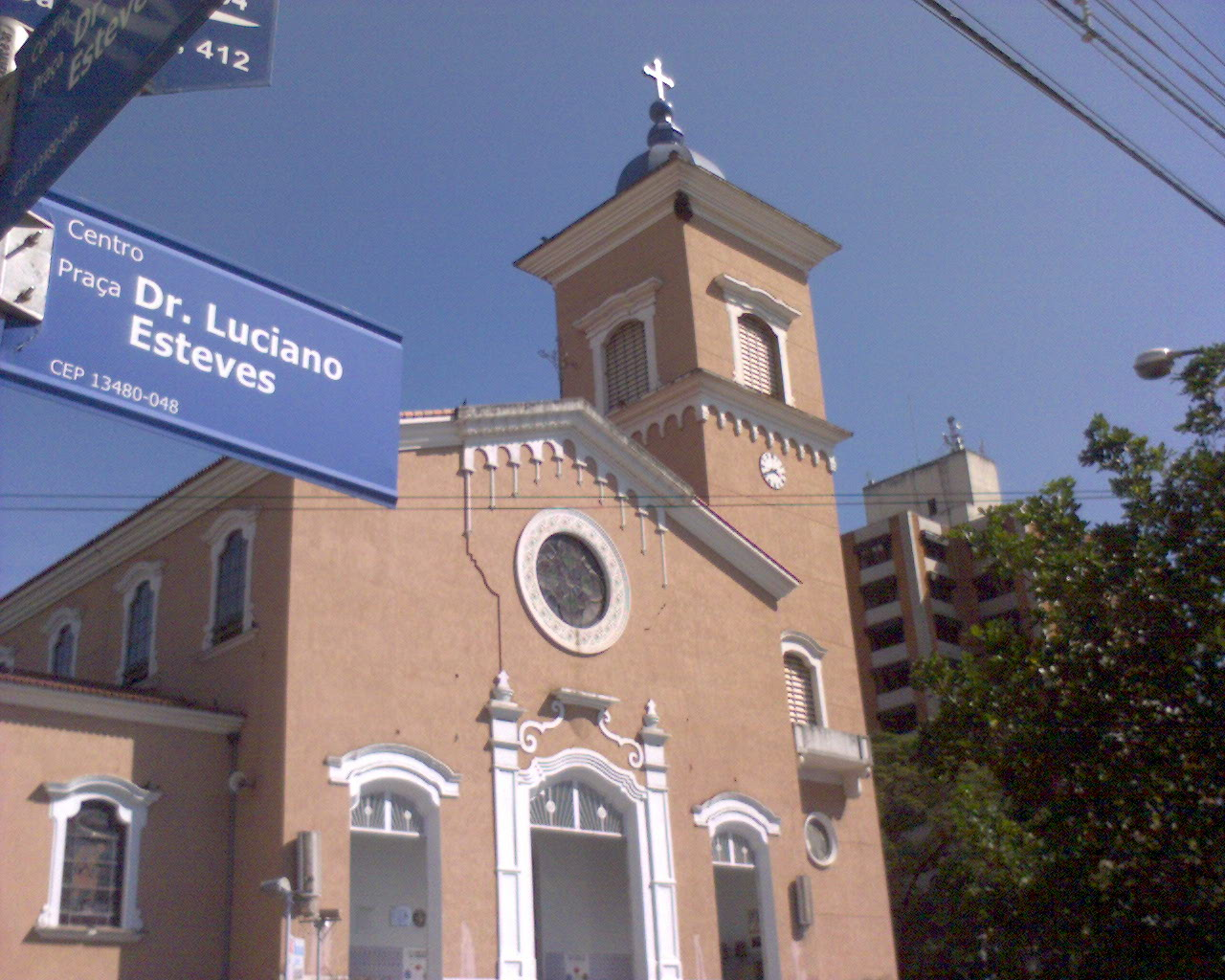
- Cathedral of Our Lady of the Dolours

Location
- Country: Brazil
- Ecclesiastical province: Campinas
- Metropolitan: Campinas

Statistics
- Area: 4,958 km^{2} (1,914 sq mi)
- Population: Total; Catholics: (as of 2004); 949,059; 632,706 (66.7%)

Information
- Denomination: Catholic Church
- Rite: Latin Rite
- Established: 29 April 1976 (50 years ago)
- Cathedral: Cathedral of Our Lady of Sorrow in Limeira

Current leadership
- Pope: Leo XIV
- Bishop: Sede vacante
- Metropolitan Archbishop: João Inácio Müller, OFM
- Bishops emeritus: Vilson Dias de Oliveira, D.C.

Map
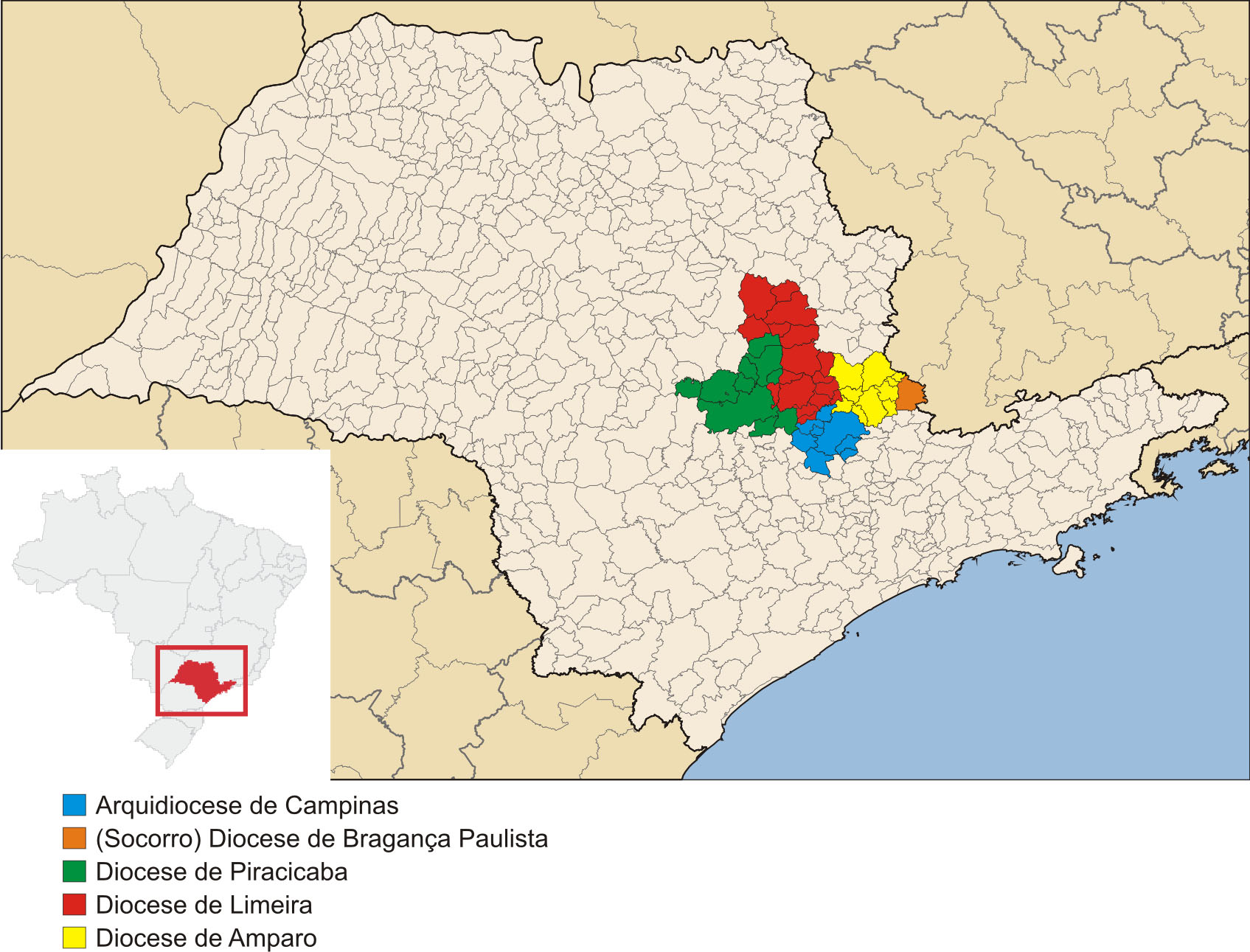

Website
- diocesedelimeira.org.br

The Roman Catholic Diocese of Limeira (Latin: Dioecesis Limeirensis) is a diocese located in the city of Limeira in the ecclesiastical province of Campinas in Brazil.

== History ==
- April 29, 1976: Established as Diocese of Limeira from the Metropolitan Archdiocese of Campinas and Diocese of Piracicaba

== Bishops ==
- José Roberto Fortes Palau (2019.11.20 – 2026.01.08), appointed Archbishop of Sorocaba, Sao Paulo
  - Apostolic Administrator Orlando Brandes (2019.05.17 – 2020.01.18), as Archbishop of Aparecida
- Vilson Dias de Oliveira, D.C. (2007.06.13 – 2019.05.17), resigned
- Augusto José Zini Filho (2003.01.22 – 2006.11.15)
- Ercílio Turco (1989.11.18 – 2002.04.24), appointed Bishop of Osasco, São Paulo
- Fernando Legal, S.D.B. (1985.04.25 – 1989.03.15), appointed Bishop of São Miguel Paulista, São Paulo
- Ariovaldo Amaral, C.SS.R. (1976.04.29 – 1984.04.14), appointed Bishop of Campanha, Minas Gerais

=== Other priests of this diocese who became bishops ===
- Sérgio Aparecido Colombo, appointed Auxiliary Bishop of São Carlos, São Paulo in 2001
- José Carlos Brandão Cabral, appointed Bishop of Almenara, Minas Gerais in 2013
- José Reginaldo Andrietta, appointed Bishop of Jales, São Paulo in 2015
