= Paulo Cezar Costa =

Brazilian prelate (born 1967)

His Eminence Paulo Cezar Costa
- Cardinal, Archbishop of Brasília
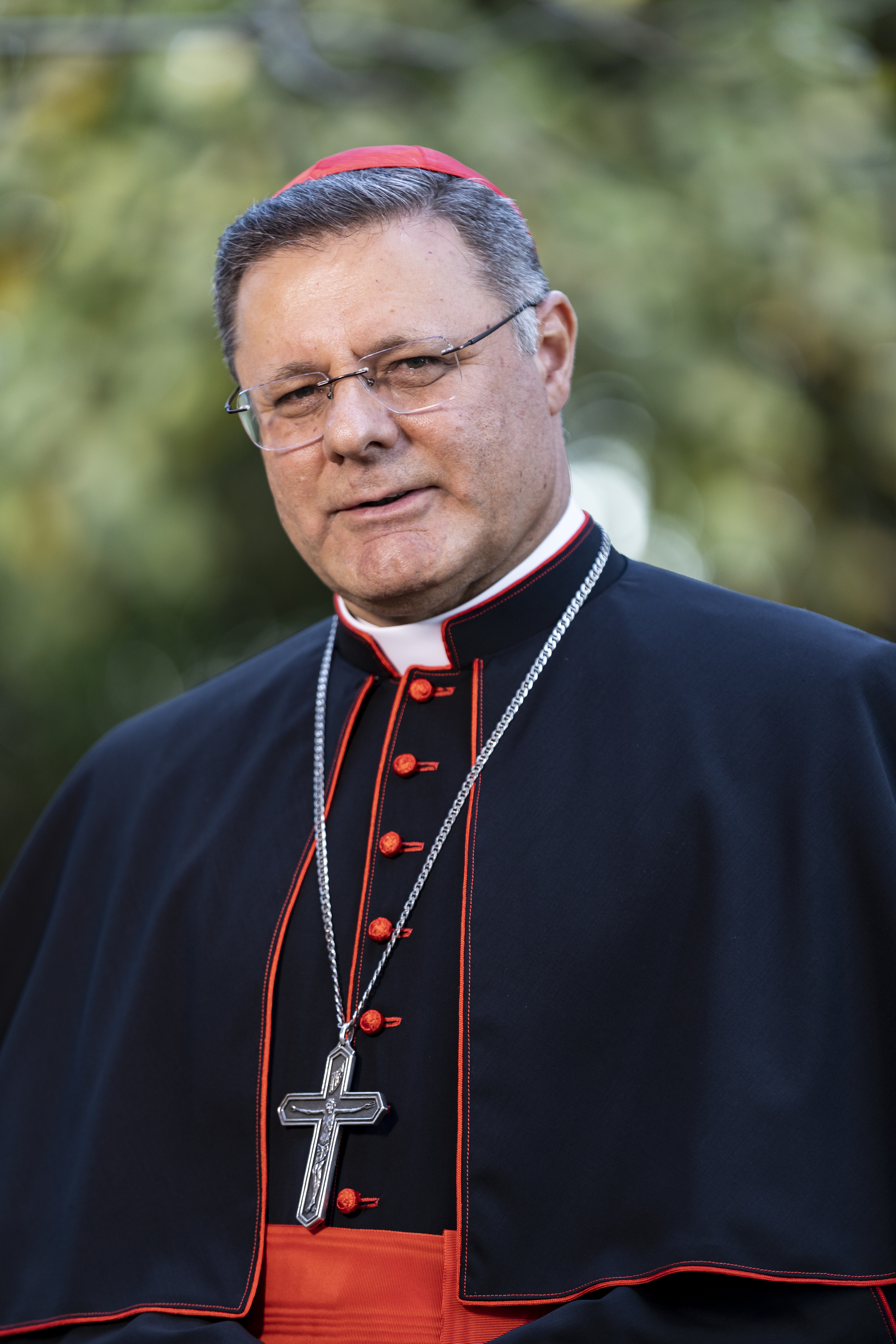
- Costa in 2022
- Church: Roman Catholic Church
- Archdiocese: Brasília
- See: Brasília
- Appointed: 21 October 2020
- Installed: 12 December 2020
- Predecessor: Sérgio da Rocha
- Previous posts: Auxiliary Bishop of Rio de Janeiro (2011–2016); Titular Bishop of Oescus (2011–2016); Bishop of São Carlos (2016–2020)

Orders
- Ordination: 5 December 1992 by Elias James Manning
- Consecration: 5 February 2011 by Orani João Tempesta
- Created cardinal: 27 August 2022 by Pope Francis
- Rank: Cardinal-Priest

Personal details
- Born: Paulo Cezar Costa; 20 July 1967 (age 59) Valença, Rio de Janeiro, Brazil
- Education: Pontifical Gregorian University
- Motto: OMNIA SUSTENEO PROPTER ELECTOS
- Coat of arms

Styles of Paulo Cezar Costa
- Reference style: His Eminence
- Spoken style: Your Eminence
- Religious style: Cardinal
- Informal style: Cardinal

Ordination history of Paulo Cezar Costa
History
Episcopal consecration
- Principal consecrator: Orani João Tempesta
- Co-consecrators: Rafael Llano Cifuentes; Elias James Manning
Cardinalate
- Elevated by: Pope Francis
Episcopal succession
Bishops consecrated by Paulo Cezar Costa as principal consecrator
- Moacir Aparecido de Freitas: 11 October 2016
- Eduardo Malaspina: 1 May 2018
- Antônio Aparecido de Marcos Filho: 25 February 2023

Paulo Cezar Costa (Note: Official sources, including the Holy See, the Episcopal Conference of Brazil, the Diocese of São Carlos, and the Archdiocese of Brasilia, render his name "Cezar", not "Cézar".) (born 20 July 1967) is a Brazilian prelate of the Catholic Church who has been Metropolitan Archbishop of Brasilia since December 2020. He has been a bishop since 2010 and served as Bishop of São Carlos from 2016 to 2020.

On 27 August 2022 Pope Francis made Costa a cardinal.

== Biography ==
Paulo Cezar Costa was born on 20 July 1967 in Valença, Brazil. He completed his studies in philosophy at the Nossa Senhora do Amor Divino Seminary in Petrópolis and his theology studies at the Higher Institute of Theology of the Archdiocese of Rio de Janeiro. He then studied at the Pontifical Gregorian University in Rome from 1996 to 2001, earning a licentiate and a doctorate in dogmatic theology. He was ordained a priest of the Diocese of Valença on 5 December 1992.

He worked as parish vicar in Paraíba do Sul in 1993; pastor of the Parish of São Sebastião dos Ferreiros in Vassouras from 1994 to 1996; pastor of the Parish of Santa Rosa de Lima in Valença from 2001 to 2006; director and professor of the Department of Theology of the Pontifical Catholic University of Rio de Janeiro (PUC-Rio) from 2007 to 2010; and rector of the Paulo VI Interdiocesan Seminary and director of the Paulo VI Institute of Philosophy and Theology in Nova Iguaçu from 2006 to 2010.

On 24 November 2010, Pope Benedict XVI appointed him titular bishop of Oescus and auxiliary bishop of the Archdiocese of Rio de Janeiro. He received his episcopal consecration on 5 February 2011. He was named to the Commission for the Doctrine of the Faith of the Brazilian Bishops' Conference in June of that year. He was vicar general of the Archdiocese and led the Suburban Vicariate while filling various administrative roles; he was a member of the University Council of the PUC-Rio and the Fundação Mantenedora Padre Anchieta; and he taught at the Archdiocesan Seminary and PUC-Rio.

On 22 June 2016, Pope Francis named Costa Bishop of São Carlos. He was installed there on 6 August. He was named a member of the Pontifical Commission for Latin America on 20 April 2020 and of the Pontifical Council for Promoting Christian Unity on 4 July 2020.

On 21 October 2020, Pope Francis appointed him Metropolitan Archbishop of Brasilia. He was installed there on 12 December.

Within the Brazilian Episcopal Conference he is a member of the Permanent Council and of the Episcopal Commission for Culture and Education. In November 2019, he was elected to the board of consulting bishops who guide the work of CELAM.

On 27 August 2022, Pope Francis made him a cardinal priest, assigning him the title of Santi Bonifacio ed Alessio. He participated as a cardinal elector in the 2025 papal conclave that elected Pope Leo XIV.

== See also ==
- Cardinals created by Pope Francis

== Notes ==
Catholic Church titles
Preceded by Paulo Sérgio Machado	Bishop of São Carlos; 22 June 2016 – 21 October 2020	Succeeded by Luiz Carlos Dias
Preceded by Sérgio da Rocha	Archbishop of Brasília; 21 October 2020 – present	Incumbent
Order of precedence
Preceded by Geraldo Alckmin as Vice President of Brazil	Brazilian order of precedence 3rd in line as Brazilian cardinal	Followed by Foreign ambassadors
