= Diocese of Ituiutaba =

Catholic ecclesiastical territory

Diocese of Ituiutaba Dioecesis Ituiutabensis

Catholic
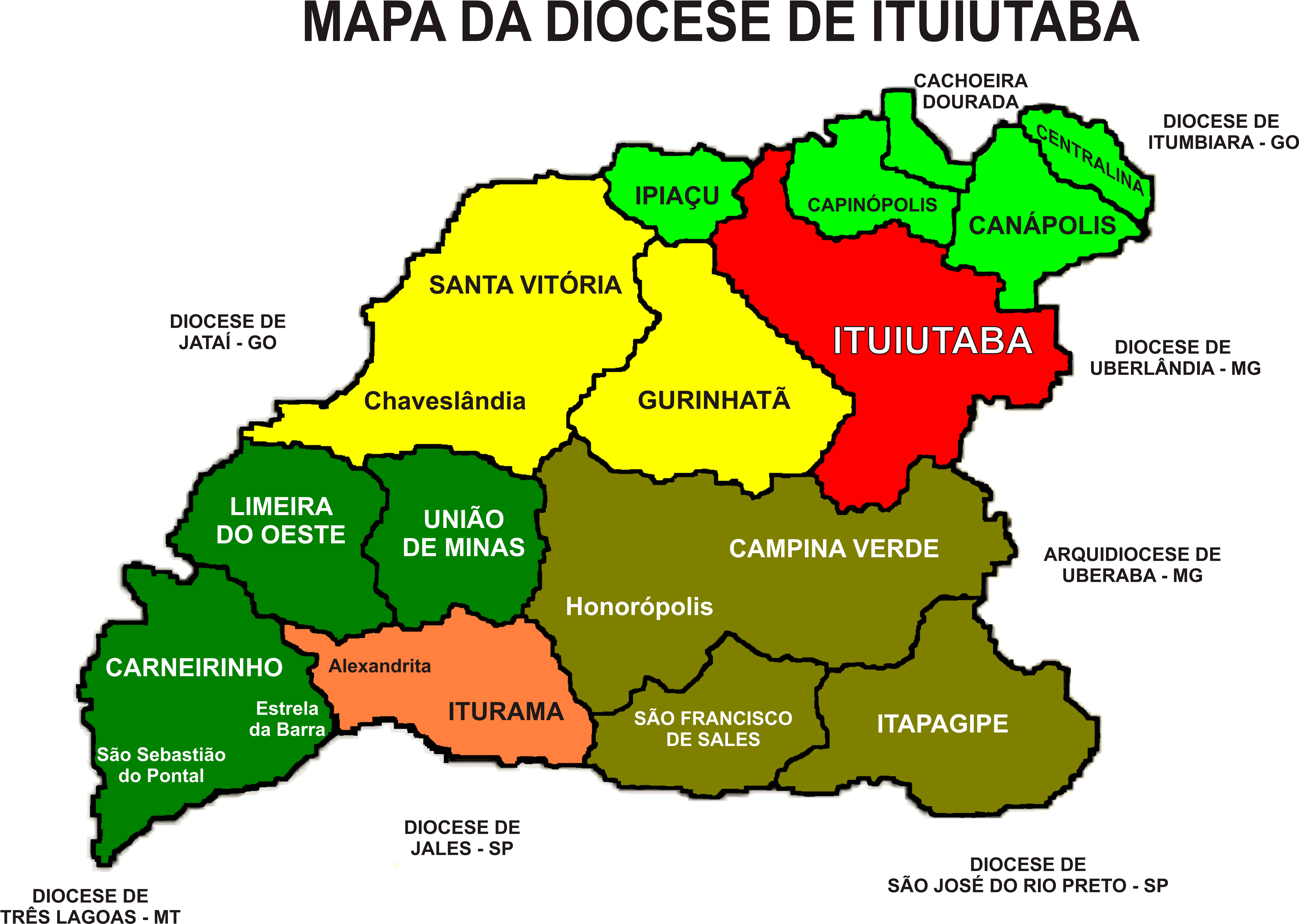

Location
- Country: Brazil
- Ecclesiastical province: Uberaba

Statistics
- Area: 22,742 km^{2} (8,781 sq mi)
- Population: Total; Catholics: (as of 2006); 345,000; 295,000 (85.5%)

Information
- Rite: Latin Rite
- Established: 16 October 1982 (44 years ago)
- Cathedral: Catedral São José

Current leadership
- Pope: Leo XIV
- Bishop: Irineu Andreassa
- Metropolitan Archbishop: Paulo Mendes Peixoto

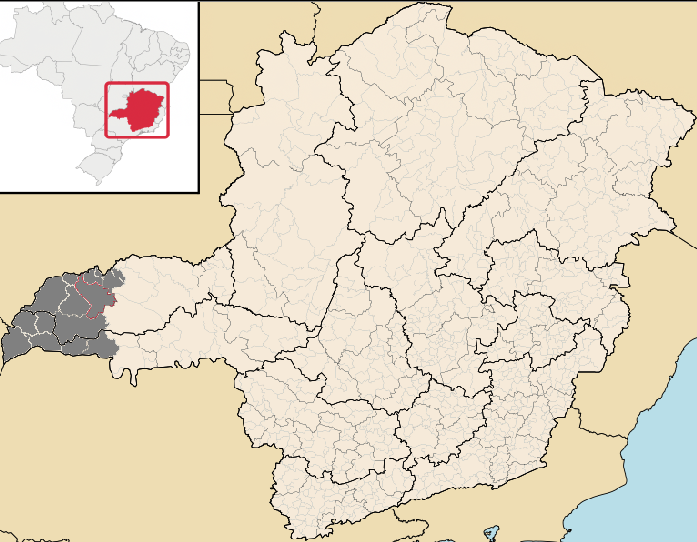
Roman Catholic Diocese of Ituiutaba.

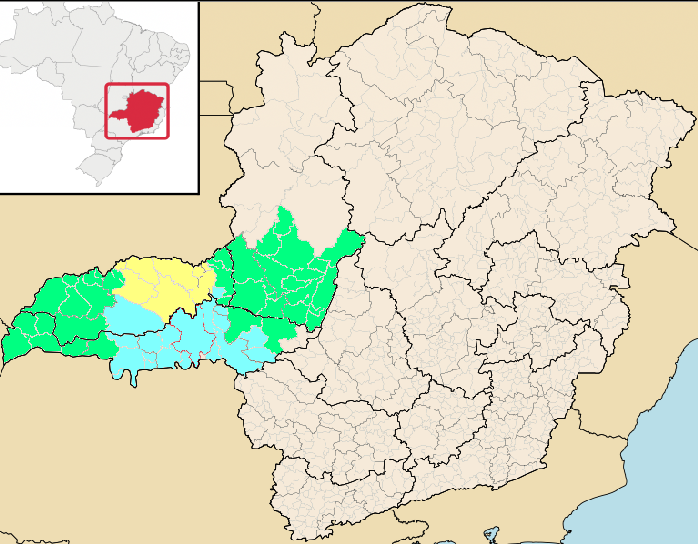
Ecclesiastical Province of Uberaba.

The Roman Catholic Diocese of Ituiutaba (Latin: Dioecesis Ituiutabensis) is a diocese located in the city of Ituiutaba in the ecclesiastical province of Uberaba in Brazil.

== History ==
- 16 October 1982: Established as Diocese of Ituiutaba from the Metropolitan Archdiocese of Uberaba and Diocese of Uberlândia

== Bishops ==
- Bishops of Ituiutaba (Roman rite)
  - Bishop Aloísio Roque Oppermann, S.C.J. (1983.01.22 – 1988.11.09), appointed Coadjutor Bishop of Campanha, Minas Gerais; future Archbishop
  - Bishop Paulo Sérgio Machado (1989.09.24 – 2006.11.22), appointed Bishop of São Carlos, São Paulo
  - Bishop Francisco Carlos da Silva (2007.09.19 – 2015.09.30), appointed Bishop of Lins, São Paulo
  - Bishop Irineu Andreassa, O.F.M. (2016.11.30 - 2025.5.22)
  - Bishop Valter Magno de Carvalho (2025.5.22 - present)

=== Another priest of this diocese who became bishop ===
- João Gilberto de Moura, appointed Bishop of Jardim, Mato Grosso do Sul in 2013
