= Bruno Gamberini =

Roman Catholic archbishop

- Archbishop of Campinas
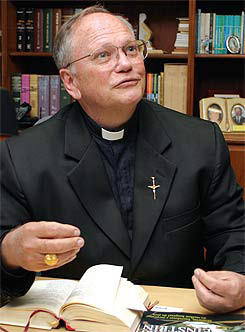
- Church: Catholic Church
- Archdiocese: Archdiocese of Campinas
- In office: 2 June 2004 – 28 August 2011
- Predecessor: Gilberto Pereira Lopes
- Successor: Airton José dos Santos
- Previous post: Bishop of Bragança Paulista (1995-2004)

Orders
- Ordination: 11 December 1974 by Constantino Amstalden
- Consecration: 16 June 1995 by Constantino Amstalden

Personal details
- Born: 16 July 1950 Matão, São Paulo, United States of Brazil
- Died: 28 August 2011 (aged 61)

Bruno Gamberini (16 July 1950 – 28 August 2011) was the Roman Catholic archbishop of the Roman Catholic Archdiocese of Campinas, Brazil.

Born in Matão, São Paulo, and ordained to the priesthood in 1974, Gamberini became a bishop in 1995 and in 2004 was appointed archbishop of the Campinas Archdiocese.
