= Gilberto Pereira Lopes =

Brazilian Roman Catholic prelate (1927–2025)

His Excellency Gilberto Pereira Lopes
- Archbishop Emeritus of Campinas
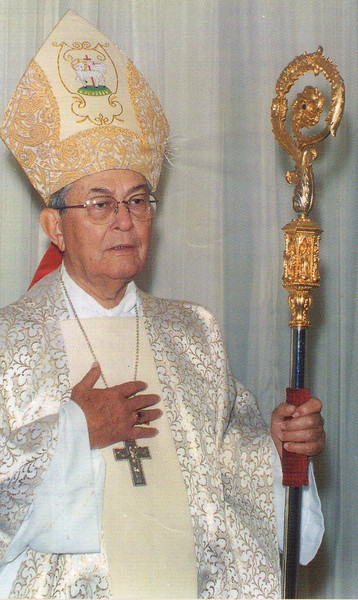
- Installed: 10 February 1982
- Term ended: 2 June 2004
- Predecessor: Antônio Maria Alves de Siqueira
- Successor: Bruno Gamberini
- Previous posts: Bishop of Ipameri (1966–1975); Coadjutor Archbishop of Campinas and Titular Bishop of Aurusuliana (1975–1982)

Orders
- Ordination: 14 December 1949 by Avelar Brandão Vilela
- Consecration: 18 December 1966 by Sebastiano Baggio, Fernando Gomes dos Santos and David Picão

Personal details
- Born: 14 February 1927 Santaluz, Bahia, Brazil
- Died: 22 September 2025 (aged 98) Campinas, São Paulo, Brazil
- Motto: Mysterium Christi praedicare

Gilberto Pereira Lopes (14 February 1927 – 22 September 2025) was a Brazilian Roman Catholic prelate. He was bishop of Ipameri from 1966 to 1975, archbishop coadjutor from 1975 to 1982, and archbishop from 1982 to 2004 of Campinas. Lopes died on 22 September 2025, at the age of 98.

Catholic Church titles
Preceded by Antônio Maria Alves de Siqueira	Archbishop of Campinas; 1982–2004	Succeeded by Bruno Gamberini
Preceded by Roberto Antonio Dávila Uzcátegui	Titular Bishop of Aurusuliana; 1975–1982	Succeeded by Edmund Michał Piszcz
Preceded by New title	Bishop of Ipameri; 1966–1975	Succeeded by Antônio Ribeiro de Oliveira
