= Antônio Maria Mucciolo =

- Archbishop of the Archdiocese of Botucatu Emeritus
- Church: Catholic Church
- See: Roman Catholic Archdiocese of Botucatu
- In office: 1989 - 2000
- Predecessor: Vicente Angelo José Marchetti Zioni
- Successor: Aloysio José Leal Penna

Orders
- Ordination: November 4, 1949

Personal details
- Born: May 1, 1923; Castel San Lorenzo, Italy
- Died: September 29, 2012

Antônio Maria Mucciolo (May 1, 1923 – September 29, 2012) was an Italian-born prelate of the Catholic Church in Brazil.

Mucciolo was born in Castel San Lorenzo, Italy and ordained a priest on November 4, 1949. Mucciolo was appointed bishop of the Diocese of Barretos on May 26, 1977, and was ordained bishop on August 15, 1977. Mucciolo was appointed archbishop of the Archdiocese of Botucatu on May 30, 1989, where Vieira served until his retirement on June 7, 2000.

== See also ==
- Archdiocese of Botucatu
- Diocese of Barretos
