= Airton José dos Santos =

His Excellency Airton José dos Santos
- Archbishop of Campinas
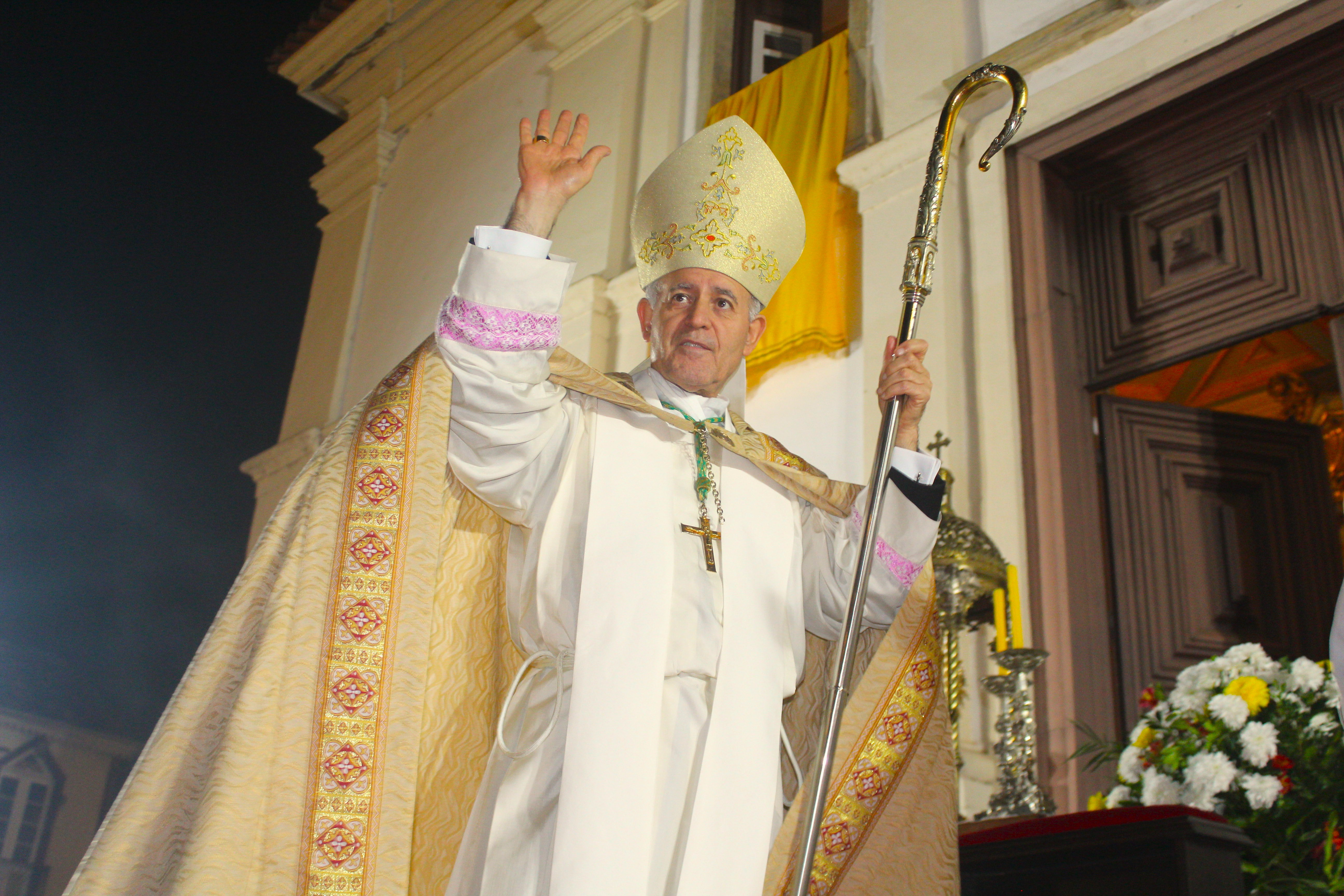
- Airton José dos Santos
- Province: Campinas
- See: Campinas
- Predecessor: Bruno Gamberini
- Previous post: Titular Bishop of Mogi das Cruzes (2004 - 2012)

Orders
- Ordination: December 8, 1985
- Consecration: 2002

Personal details
- Born: June 26, 1956 (age 69) Bom Repouso, Minas Gerais
- Denomination: Roman Catholic

Dom Airton José dos Santos (born in Bom Repouso, June 26, 1956) is a Brazilian priest and bishop, was bishop of the diocese of Mogi das Cruzes from 2002 until 2012. He was appointed Archbishop of Campinas by Pope Benedict XVI on February 15, 2012.
