= Archdiocese of Botucatu =

Ecclesiastical territory in Brazil

Coordinates: 22.8859°S 48.4450°W

Archdiocese of Botucatu Archidioecesis Botucatuensis Arquidiocese de Botucatu
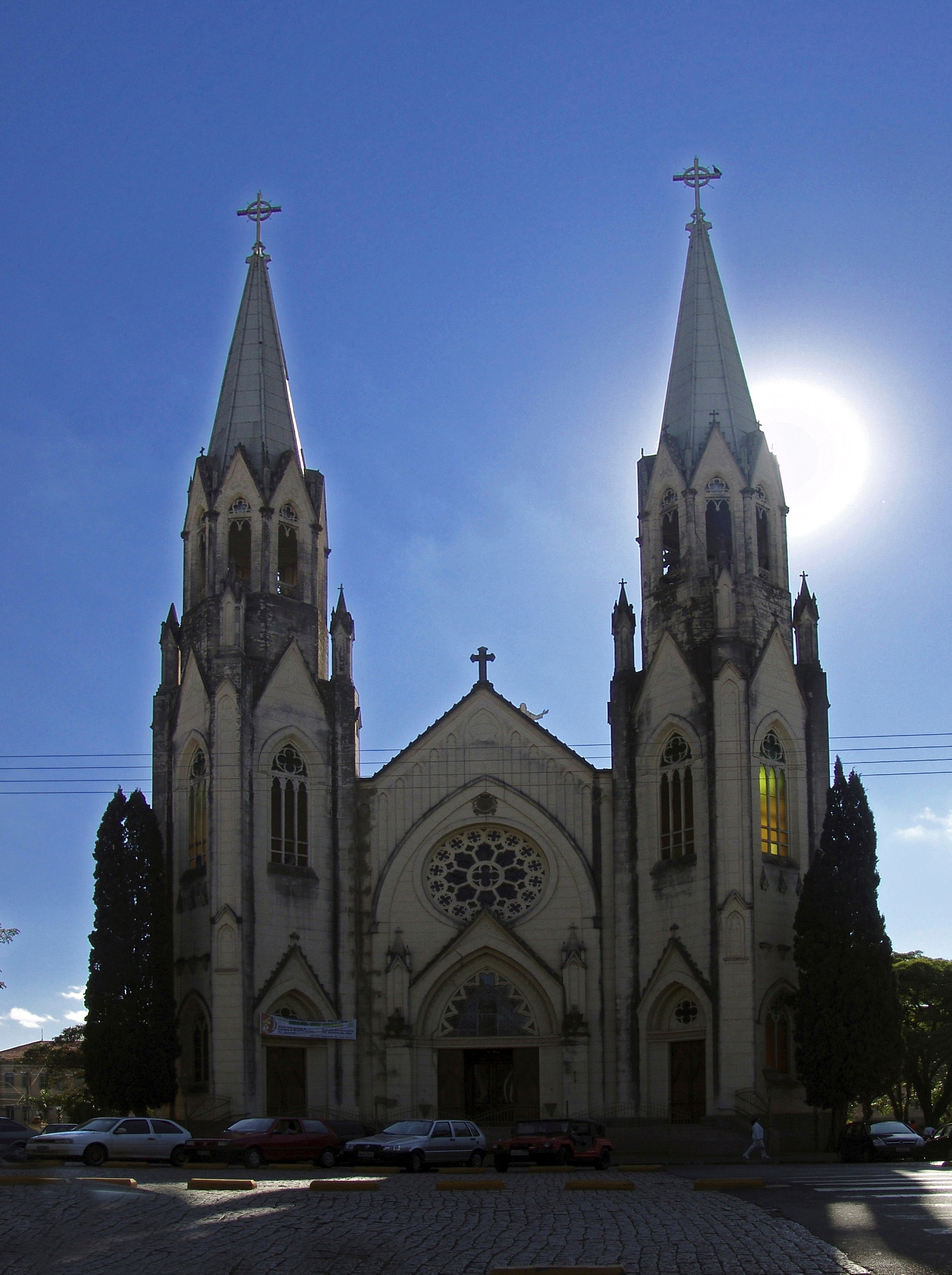
- Metropolitan Cathedral-Basilica of St. Ann

- Coat of arms

Location
- Country: Brazil

Statistics
- Area: 10,248 km^{2} (3,957 sq mi)
- Population: Total; Catholics: (as of 2012); 544,000; 461,000 (84.7%)
- Parishes: 45

Information
- Rite: Latin Rite
- Established: 7 June 1908 (117 years ago)
- Cathedral: Cathedral Basilica of St Anne in Botucatu
- Patron saint: Saint Anne

Current leadership
- Pope: Leo XIV
- Metropolitan Archbishop: Maurício Grotto de Camargo

Map

The Roman Catholic Archdiocese of Botucatu (Latin: Archidioecesis Botucatuensis) is an archdiocese located in the city of Botucatu in Brazil.

== History ==
- June 7, 1908: Established as Diocese of Botucatu from the Diocese of São Paulo

In 1937 the bishop of the diocese, Carlos Duarte Costa resigned under pressure from the Vatican. He would later go on to form a Brazilian Catholic Church that allowed married priests and ended personal confessions.

- April 19, 1958: Promoted as Metropolitan Archdiocese of Botucatu

== Bishops ==
=== Ordinaries ===
- Bishops of Botucatu (Latin Rite)
  - Lúcio Antunes de Souza (1908.10.17 – 1923.10.19)
  - Carlos Duarte Costa (1924.07.04 – 1937.09.22)
  - Antonio Colturato, O.F.M. Cap. (1938.04.12 – 1946.05.05)
  - Henrique Hector Golland Trindade, O.F.M. (1948.05.15 – 1958.04.19)
- Archbishops of Botucatu
  - Henrique Hector Golland Trindade, O.F.M. (1958.04.19 – 1968.03.27)
  - Vicente Ângelo José Marchetti Zioni (1968.03.27 – 1989.05.30)
  - Antônio Maria Mucciolo (1989.05.30 – 2000.06.07)
  - Aloysio José Leal Penna, S.J. (2000.06.07 – 2008.11.19)
  - Maurício Grotto de Camargo (2008.11.19 – present)

=== Auxiliary bishop ===
- Silvio Maria Dário (1965–1968), appointed Bishop of Itapeva, São Paulo

=== Other priests of this diocese who became bishops ===
- José Melhado Campos, appointed Bishop of Lorena, São Paulo in 1960
- Carlos José de Oliveira, appointed Bishop of Apucarana, Parana in 2018

== Suffragan dioceses ==
- Diocese of Araçatuba
- Diocese of Assis
- Diocese of Bauru
- Diocese of Lins
- Diocese of Marília
- Diocese of Ourinhos
- Diocese of Presidente Prudente

== Sources ==
- GCatholic.org
- Catholic Hierarchy
- Diocese website
