= Joviano de Lima Júnior =

Brazilian Roman Catholic archbishop

Joviano de Lima Júnior SSS
- Archbishop of Ribeirão Preto
- Church: Catholic Church
- Archdiocese: Archdiocese of Ribeirão Preto
- In office: 5 April 2006 – 21 June 2012
- Predecessor: Arnaldo Ribeiro
- Successor: Moacir Silva
- Previous post: Bishop of São Carlos (1995-2006)

Orders
- Ordination: 8 December 1969
- Consecration: 27 December 1995 by Geraldo Majella Agnelo

Personal details
- Born: 23 April 1942 Uberaba, Minas Gerais, Republic of the United States of Brazil
- Died: 21 June 2012 (aged 70)

Joviano de Lima Júnior (23 April 1942 – 21 June 2012) was the Roman Catholic archbishop of the Roman Catholic Archdiocese of Ribeirão Preto, Brazil.

Ordained in 1969, de Lima Júnior was named bishop in 1995 and died while still in office.
