= Archdiocese of Campinas =

Catholic ecclesiastical territory

Coordinates: 22.9060°S 47.0604°W

Archdiocese of Campinas Archidioecesis Campinensis Arquidiocese de Campinas
- Coat of arms

Location
- Country: Brazil

Statistics
- Area: 2,134 km^{2} (824 sq mi)
- Population: Total; Catholics: (as of 2006); 1,748,115; 1,275,980 (73.0%)

Information
- Rite: Latin Rite
- Established: 7 June 1908 (117 years ago)
- Cathedral: Cathedral of the Immaculate Conception in Campinas

Current leadership
- Pope: Leo XIV
- Metropolitan Archbishop: João Inácio Müller, OFM

Map
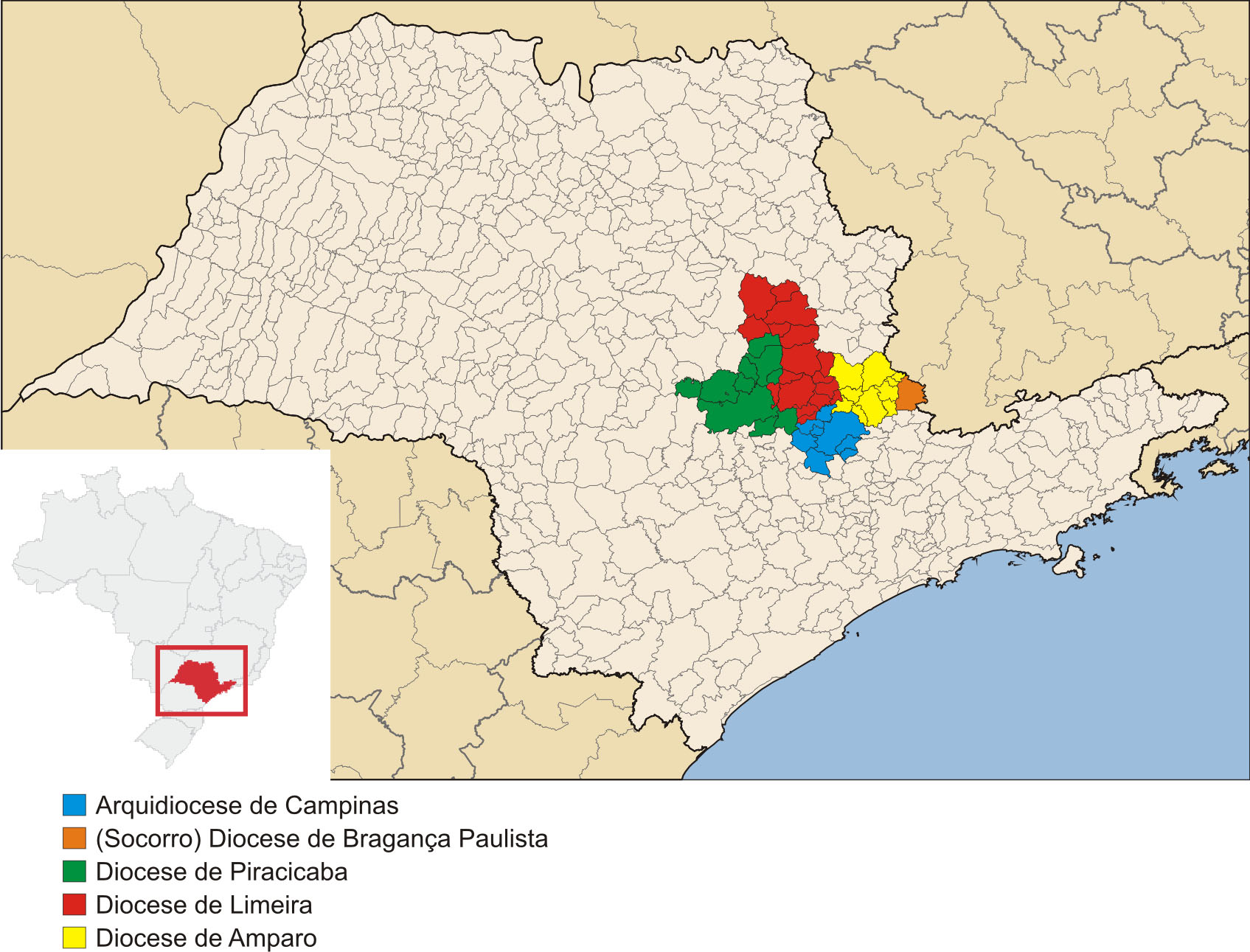

Website
- arquidiocesecampinas.com

The Roman Catholic Archdiocese of Campinas (Latin: Archidioecesis Campinensis) is an archdiocese located in the city of Campinas in Brazil.

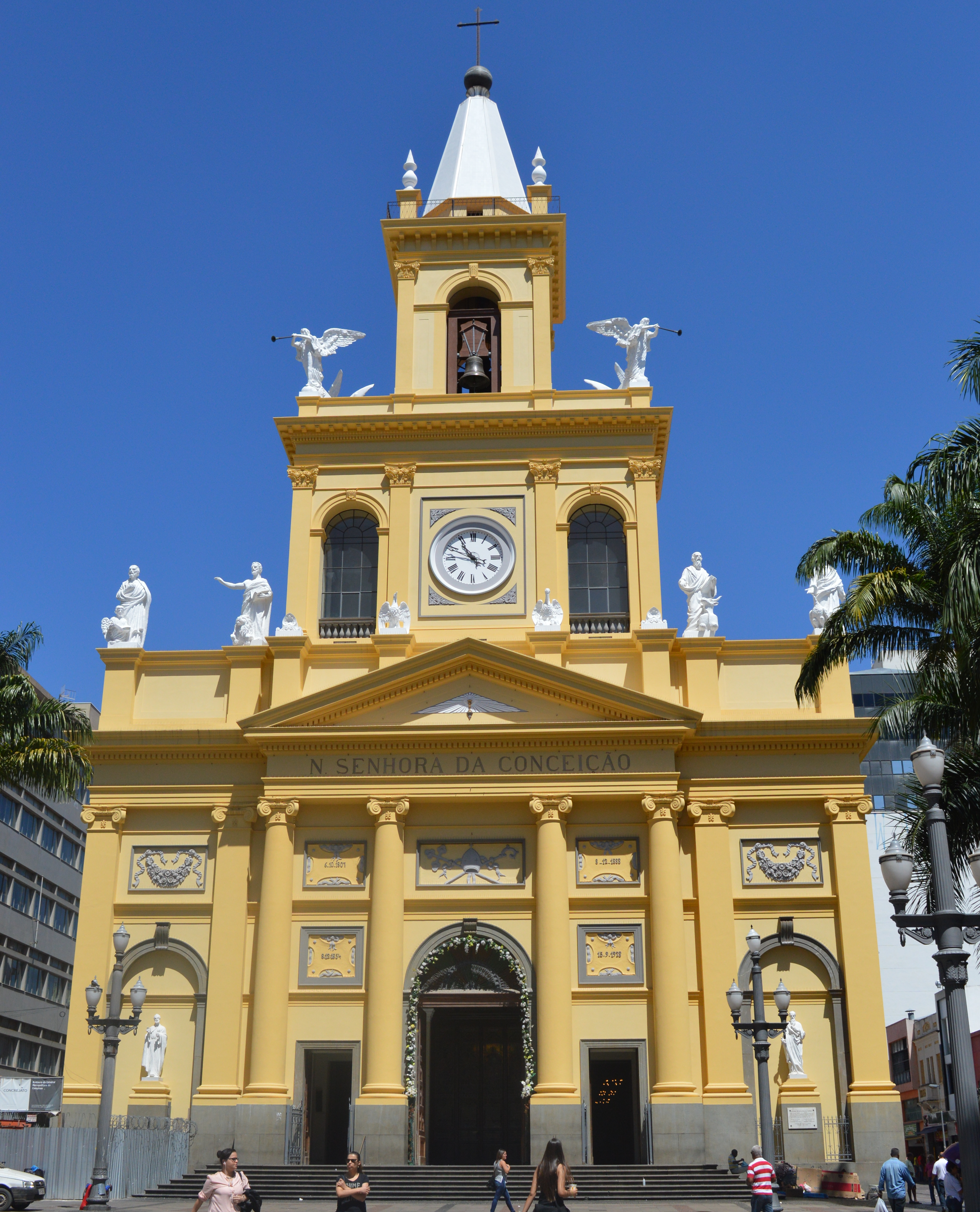
The Metropolitan Cathedral of Campinas is the see of Archdiocese.

== History ==
- June 7, 1908: Established as Diocese of Campinas from the Diocese of São Paulo
- April 19, 1958: Promoted as Metropolitan Archdiocese of Campinas

== Special churches ==
- Minor Basilicas:
  - Basílica Nossa Senhora do Carmo

== Bishops ==
=== Ordinaries, in reverse chronological order ===
- Archbishops of Campinas (Roman rite), below
  - Archbishop João Inácio Müller, O.F.M. (since 2019.05.15)
  - Archbishop Airton José dos Santos (2012.02.15 - 2018.04.25), appointed Archbishop of Mariana, Minas Gerais
  - Archbishop Bruno Gamberini (2004.08.01 – 2011.08.28)
  - Archbishop Gilberto Pereira Lopes (1982.02.10 – 2004.08.01)
  - Archbishop Antônio Maria Alves de Siqueira (1968.09.19 – 1982.02.10)
  - Archbishop Paulo de Tarso Campos (1958.04.19 – 1968.09.19) see below
- Bishops of Campinas (Roman Rite), below
  - Bishop Paulo de Tarso Campos (later Archbishop) (1941.12.14 – 1958.04.19) see above
  - Bishop Franciscus de Campos Barreto (1920.07.30 – 1941.08.22)
  - Bishop João Batista Corrêa Nery (1908.08.03 – 1920.02.01)

=== Coadjutor archbishops ===
- Antônio Maria Alves de Siqueira (1966–1968)
- Gilberto Pereira Lopes (1975–1982)

=== Auxiliary bishops ===
- Joaquim Mamede da Silva (1916–1947)
- Bernardo José Bueno Miele (1962–1967), appointed Coadjutor Archbishop of Ribeirão Preto, São Paulo
- Luiz Antônio Guedes (1997–2001) appointed Bishop of Bauru, São Paulo

=== Other priests of this diocese who became bishops ===
- Octávio Augusto Chagas de Miranda, appointed Bishop of Pouso Alegre in 1916
- Agnelo Rossi, appointed Bishop of Barra do Piraí in 1956; future Cardinal
- Ercílio Turco, appointed Bishop of Limeira, São Paulo in 1989
- Pedro Carlos Cipolini, appointed Bishop of Amparo, São Paulo in 2010

== Suffragan dioceses ==
- Diocese of Amparo
- Diocese of Bragança Paulista
- Diocese of Jaú
- Diocese of Limeira
- Diocese of Piracicaba
- Diocese of São Carlos

== Sources ==
- GCatholic.org
- Catholic Hierarchy
