= Diocese of Lins =

Catholic ecclesiastical territory

Coordinates: 21.6752°S 49.7516°W

Diocese of Lins Dioecesis Linensis Diocese de Lins
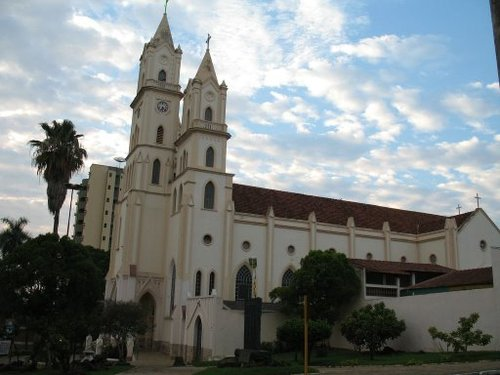
- Cathedral of St. Anthony

Location
- Country: Brazil
- Ecclesiastical province: Botucatu
- Metropolitan: Botucatu

Statistics
- Area: 8,429 km^{2} (3,254 sq mi)
- Population: Total; Catholics: (as of 2004); 280,457; 183,350 (65.4%)

Information
- Rite: Latin Rite
- Established: 21 June 1926 (99 years ago)
- Cathedral: Cathedral of St Anthony in Lins
- Co-cathedral: Co-Cathedral of St Elizabeth of Hungary in Cafelândia

Current leadership
- Pope: Leo XIV
- Bishop: Francisco Carlos da Silva
- Metropolitan Archbishop: Maurício Grotto de Camargo
- Bishops emeritus: Ireneu Danelón, S.D.B.

The Roman Catholic Diocese of Lins (Latin: Dioecesis Linensis) is a diocese located in the city of Lins in the ecclesiastical province of Botucatu in Brazil.

== History ==
- June 21, 1926: Established as Diocese of Cafelândia from Diocese of Botucatu
- May 27, 1950: Renamed as Diocese of Lins

== Bishops ==
=== Ordinaries in reverse chronological order ===
- Bishops of Lins (Roman rite)
  - Bishop Francisco Carlos da Silva (2015.09.30 - present)
  - Bishop Irineu Danelón, S.D.B. (1987.11.26 – 2015.09.30)
  - Bishop Walter Bini, S.D.B. (1984.03.14 – 1987.06.17)
  - Bishop Luiz Colussi (1980.10.11 – 1983.12.05)
  - Bishop Pedro Paulo Koop, M.S.C. (1964.07.27 – 1980.10.11)
  - Bishop Henrique Gelain (1950.05.27 – 1964.03.28)
- Bishops of Cafelândia (Roman Rite)
  - Bishop Henrique Gelain (1948.05.22 – 1950.05.27)
  - Bishop Henrique César Fernandes Mourão, S.D.B. (1935.12.16 – 1945.03.30)
  - Bishop Ático Eusébio da Rocha (later Archbishop) (1928.12.17 – 1935.12.16)

=== Coadjutor bishop ===
- Luiz Colussi (1980)

== Sources ==
- GCatholic.org
- Catholic Hierarchy
- Diocese website
