= Mineiros do Tietê =

- Municipality
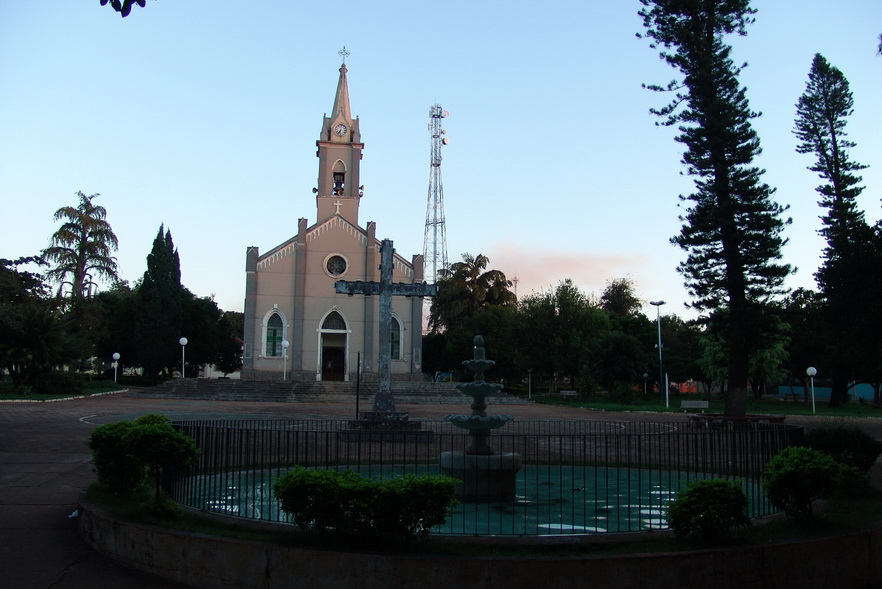

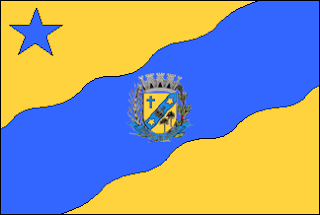
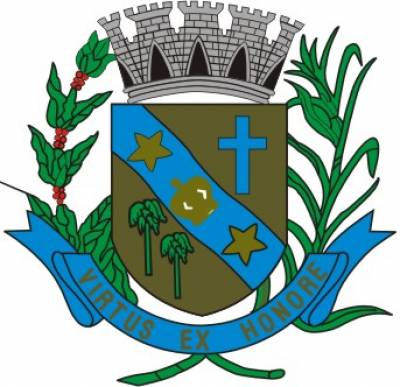
- Flag Coat of arms

- Location in São Paulo state

- Location in Brazil
- Coordinates: 22°24′34″S 48°27′02″W
- Country: Brazil
- Region: Southeast
- State: São Paulo

Area
  - Total: 213 km^{2} (82 sq mi)
- Elevation: 669 m (2,195 ft)

Population (2020)
  - Total: 12,966
  - Density: 60.9/km^{2} (158/sq mi)
- Time zone: UTC−3 (BRT)

Mineiros do Tietê is a municipality in the state of São Paulo in Brazil. The population is 12,966 (2020 est.) in an area of 213 km^{2} (82 sq mi). It is situated in the center of the state of São Paulo, near the following cities: Dois Córregos (9 km), Barra Bonita (13 km), Jaú (18 km), São Manuel (45 km), Torrinha (35 km), Igaraçu do Tietê (15 km), Lençois Paulista (46 km), Pederneiras (45 km) and Bauru (82 km). It is located at an altitude of 669 meters, near the Tietê River.

== History ==
In the middle of the 19th century settlers from Minas Gerais came to the area. Therefore, the settlement was initially named Barrio dos Mineiros. Around 1875, a chapel was built and houses sprung up around it. In 1891 the village Capela de Mineiros became a district of the municipality Dois Córregos. In August 1899, it was elevated to town status, and it became an independent municipality with the name of Mineiros. Its name was changed to Mineiros do Tietê (after the Tietê River) in 1944.

== Media ==
In telecommunications, the city was served by Companhia Telefônica Brasileira until 1973, when it began to be served by Telecomunicações de São Paulo. In July 1998, this company was acquired by Telefónica, which adopted the Vivo brand in 2012.

The company is currently an operator of cell phones, fixed lines, internet (fiber optics/4G) and television (satellite and cable).

== See also ==
- List of municipalities in São Paulo
