= João Inácio Müller =

Brazilian Roman Catholic archbishop

The Most Reverend João Inácio Müller O.F.M.
- Archbishop of Campinas
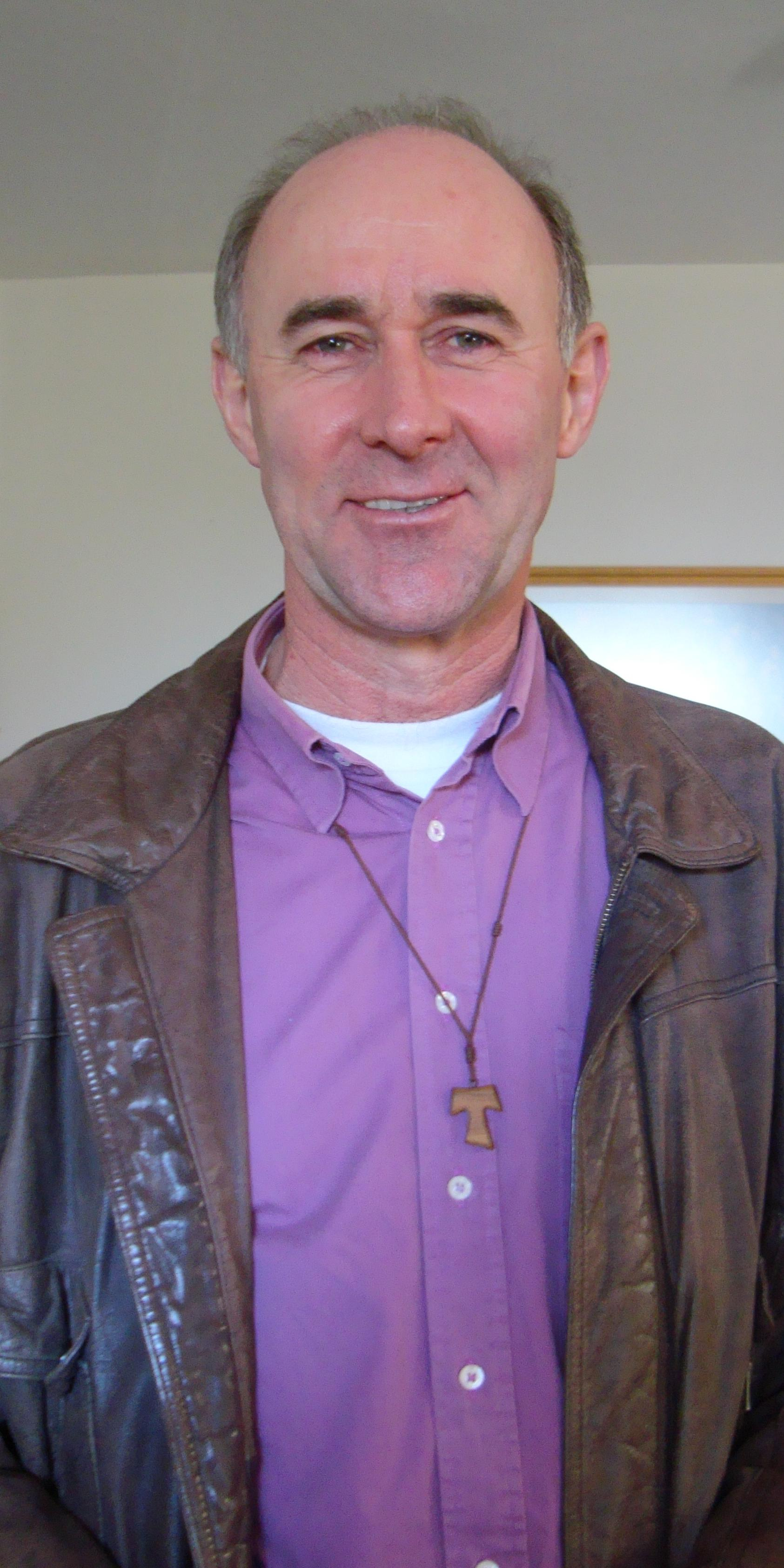
- Müller as a provincial minister pictured in July 2009.
- Church: Roman Catholic Church
- Archdiocese: Campinas
- See: Campinas
- Appointed: 5 May 2019
- Installed: 14 July 2019
- Predecessor: Airton José dos Santos
- Previous post: Bishop of Lorena (2013-19)

Orders
- Ordination: 3 December 1988
- Consecration: 15 December 2013 by Cláudio Hummes

Personal details
- Born: João Inácio Müller; 15 June 1960 (age 66) Santa Clara do Sul, Rio Grande do Sul, Brazil
- Education: Pontifical Catholic University of Rio Grande do Sul; Antonianum
- Motto: Amor Dei Glória ("Love is the glory of God")
- Coat of arms: João Inácio Müller's coat of arms

João Inácio Müller, O.F.M. (born 15 June 1960) is a Brazilian Roman Catholic archbishop.

Ordained to the priesthood on 3 December 1988, Müller was named as the bishop of Lorena, Brazil on 25 September 2013. On 5 May 2019, he was appointed the Archbishop of Campinas.
