= Castanho =

Castanho (Portuguese pronunciation: [kɐʃˈtɐɲu], meaning brown) is a common surname in Portuguese.

- Abraham Castanho (17th century), Spanish poet
- Bianca Castanho (1979), Brazilian actress
- José Carlos Castanho de Almeida (1930–2022), Brazilian Roman Catholic prelate
- Klara Castanho (2000), Brazilian actress and singer
- Luiz Castanho de Almeida (1904–1981), Brazilian historian
- Thiago Castanho (1975), Brazilian guitarist, record producer, painter and sculptor
