= Roman Catholic Diocese of Votuporanga =

Catholic ecclesiastical territory

Coordinates: 20°25′22″S 49°58′22″W

Diocese of Votuporanga Dioecesis Votuporangensis Diocese de Votuporanga
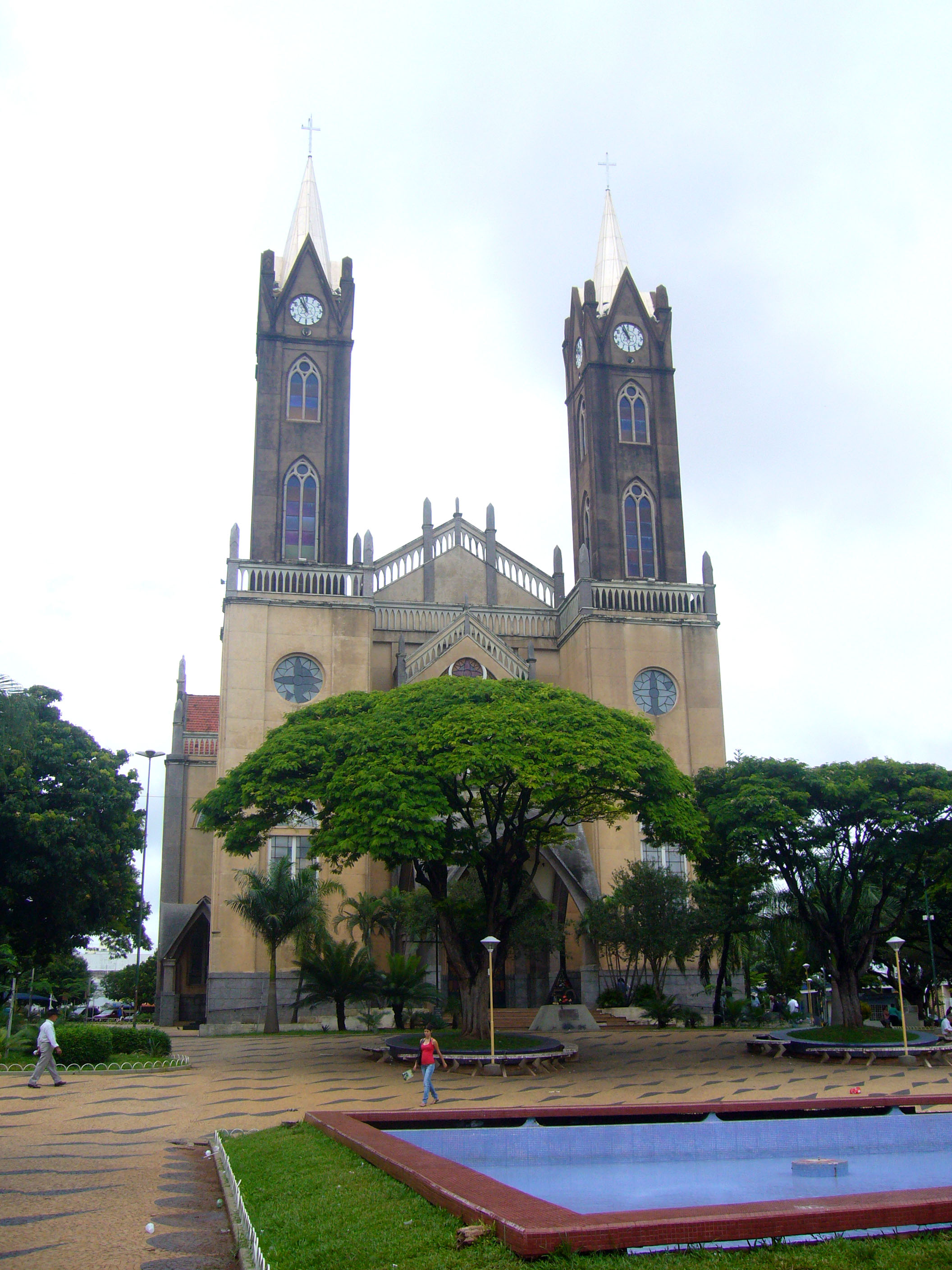

Location
- Country: Brazil
- Metropolitan: Archdiocese of São José do Rio Preto
- Headquarters: Votuporanga, São Paulo, Brazil

Statistics
- Area: 7,695 km^{2} (2,971 sq mi)
- Population: Total; Catholics: (as of 2023); 260,885; 164,246 (63.0%)
- Parishes: 31

Information
- Denomination: Catholic Church
- Sui iuris church: Latin Church
- Rite: Roman Rite
- Established: 20 July 2016; 10 years ago
- Cathedral: Catedral de Nossa Senhora Aparecida
- Patron saint: Our Lady of Aparecida
- Secular priests: 32 (30 Diocesan, 2 Religious Orders)

Current leadership
- Pope: Leo XIV
- Bishop: Moacir Aparecido de Freitas
- Metropolitan Archbishop: Antônio Emídio Vilar, S.D.B.

The Roman Catholic Diocese of Votuporanga is a suffragan diocese in the ecclesiastical province of São José do Rio Preto, in the northwest of São Paulo State, southern Brazil.

Its cathedral seat is the Catedral Nossa Senhora Aparecida, devoted to Our Lady of Aparecida, in Votuporanga, São Paulo State.

== History ==
Established on 20 July 2016 by Pope Francis as Diocese of Votuporanga, on Brazilian territories split off from the Diocese of Jales and the Diocese of São José do Rio Preto. It still borders both as well as the dioceses of Ituiutaba and Araçatuba. It instantly depended on the Roman Congregation for Bishops, without having had a missionary phase.

== Leadership ==
=== Bishops of Votuporanga ===
- Moacir Aparecido de Freitas (20 July 2016 – Present)

== External links and sources ==
- GCatholic
