= Antônio Gaspar =

Brazilian Roman Catholic bishop (born 1931)

His Excellency Antônio Gaspar
- Bishop Emeritus of Barretos
- Church: Roman Catholic Church
- Archdiocese: São José do Rio Preto
- Diocese: Barretos
- Appointed: 20 December 2000
- Term ended: 9 January 2008
- Predecessor: Pedro Fré
- Successor: Edmilson Amador Caetano
- Other post: Titular Bishop of Cozyla (1982–2000)

Orders
- Ordination: 8 July 1962
- Consecration: 6 February 1983 by Paulo Evaristo Arns

Personal details
- Born: 11 November 1931 (age 94) São Paulo, Brazil
- Motto: Para que todos sejam um

Antônio Gaspar (born 11 November 1931) is a Brazilian Roman Catholic prelate, who served as bishop of the Diocese of Barretos from 2000 to 2008. He previously served as auxiliary bishop of the Archdiocese of São Paulo and titular bishop of Cozyla from 1982 to 2000.

== Early life and priesthood ==
Antônio Gaspar was born on 11 November 1931 in São Paulo, Brazil. He attended preparatory studies at the São Roque Seminary, and philosophy and theology studies at the Seminário Central do Ipiranga, of the Archdiocese of São Paulo and was ordained a priest for the Archdiocese of São Paulo on 8 July 1962.

== Episcopacy ==
On 6 December 1982, Gaspar was appointed auxiliary bishop of São Paulo and titular bishop of Cozyla by Pope John Paul II. He received his episcopal consecration on 6 February 1983 from Cardinal Paulo Evaristo Arns.

During his tenure in São Paulo, he served in several pastoral and administrative roles, including vicar general, regional bishop of Santo Amaro, episcopal vicar of the Sé region, coordinator of the Regional Missionary Council (COMIRE) of the National Conference of Bishops of Brazil, and procurator-general of the archdiocesan curia.

On 20 December 2000, Pope John Paul II appointed him bishop of the Diocese of Barretos. He took canonical possession of the diocese on 3 March 2001.

Gaspar served as bishop of Barretos until 9 January 2008, when Pope Benedict XVI accepted his resignation upon reaching the canonical retirement age. He then became bishop emeritus of the diocese.
