= Diocese of São João da Boa Vista =

Catholic ecclesiastical territory

Diocese of São João da Boa Vista Dioecesis Sancti Ioannis in Brasilia

Catholic
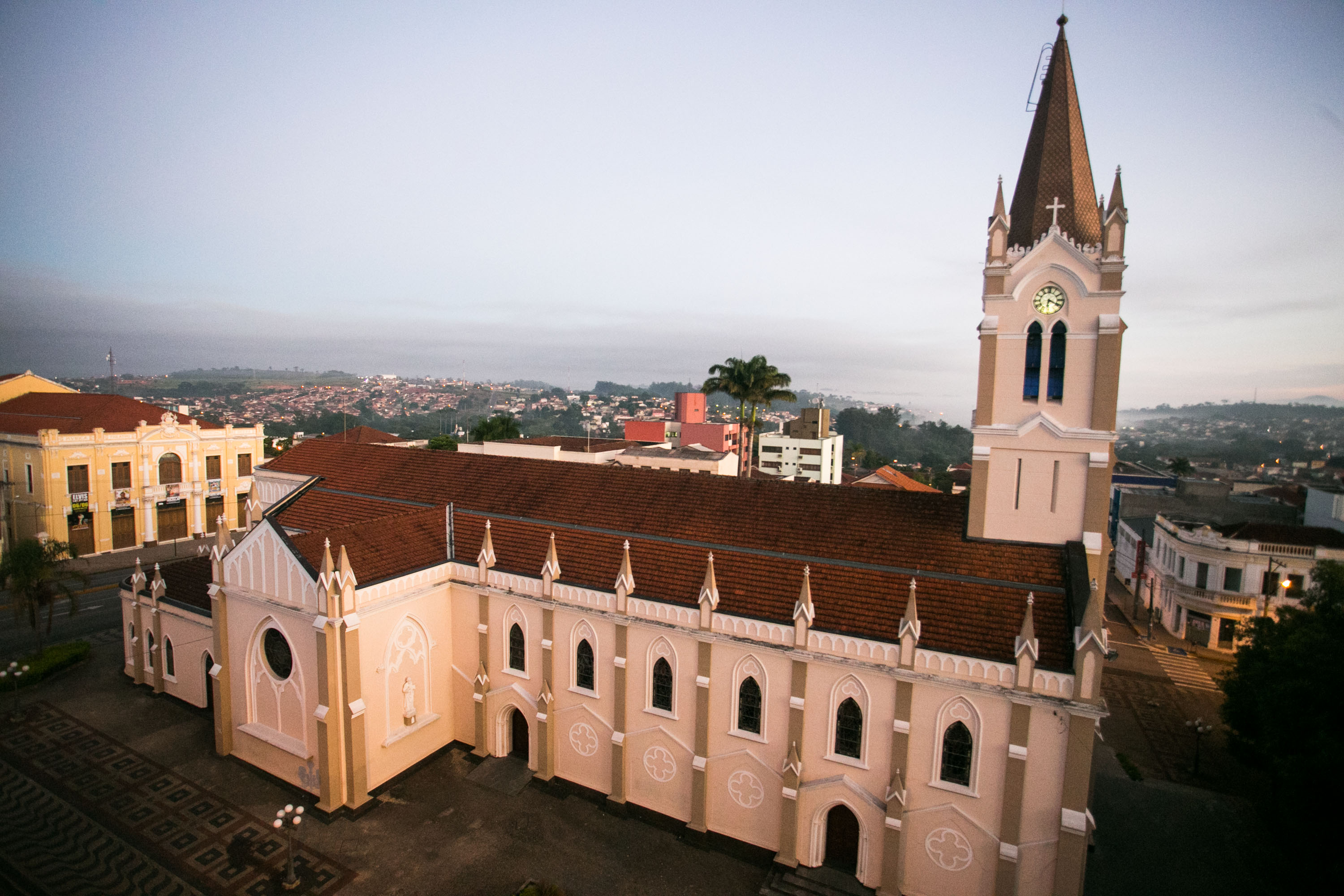
- Catedral São João Batista in 2014

Location
- Country: Brazil
- Ecclesiastical province: Ribeirão Preto

Statistics
- Area: 7,089 km^{2} (2,737 sq mi)
- Population: Total; Catholics: (as of 2023); 677,000; 448,000 (66.2%)
- Parishes: 79

Information
- Denomination: Catholic Church
- Sui iuris church: Latin Church
- Rite: Roman Rite
- Established: 16 January 1960; 66 years ago
- Cathedral: Catedral São João Batista
- Secular priests: 245 (166 Diocesan, 79 Religious Orders)

Current leadership
- Pope: Leo XIV
- Bishop: Eugênio Barbosa Martins, S.S.S.
- Metropolitan Archbishop: Moacir Silva
- Bishops emeritus: José Carlos Brandão Cabral

Map
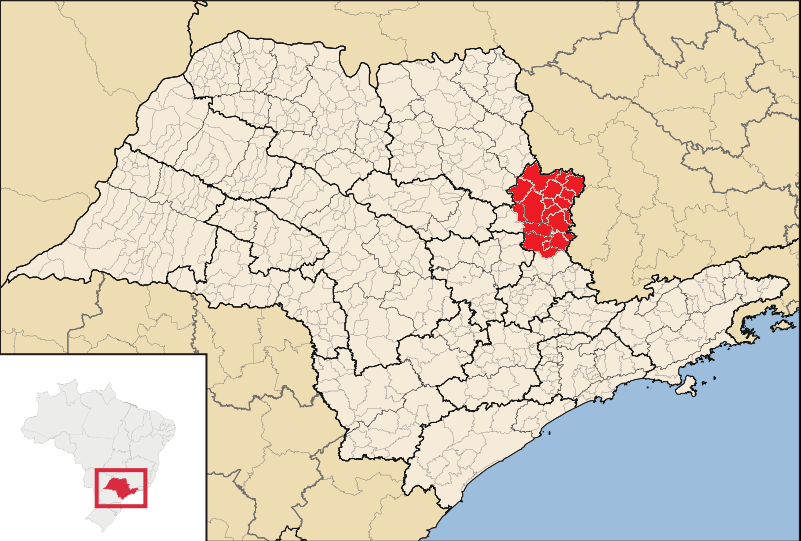

The Roman Catholic Diocese of São João da Boa Vista (Latin: Dioecesis Sancti Ioannis in Brasilia) is a diocese located in the city of São João da Boa Vista in the ecclesiastical province of Ribeirão Preto in Brazil.

== History ==
- 16 January 1960: Established as Diocese of São João da Boa Vista from the Diocese of Rio Preto

== Bishops ==
=== Bishops of São João da Boa Vista (Latin Rite) ===
- David Picão (1960.05.14 – 1963.05.10), appointed Coadjutor Bishop of Santos, São Paulo
- Tomás Vaquero (1963.07.02 – 1991.01.23), retired
- Dadeus Grings (1991.01.23 – 2000.04.12), appointed Coadjutor Archbishop of Porto Alegre, Rio Grande do Sul
- David Dias Pimentel (2001.02.07 – 2016.09.28), retired
- Antônio Emídio Vilar, S.D.B. (2016.09.28 – 2022.01.19), appointed Bishop of São José do Rio Preto, São Paulo
- José Carlos Brandão Cabral (2022.08.03 – 2023.12.07), resigned
  - Apostolic Administrator Moacir Silva (2023.12.07 – 2024.04.04), Archbishop of Ribeirão Preto, São Paulo
- Eugênio Barbosa Martins, S.S.S. (2024.01.04 – Present)

=== Other priests of this diocese who became bishops ===
- Luiz Gonzaga Bergonzini (1960-1991), appointed Bishop of Guarulhos, São Paulo
- Luiz Antônio Cipolini (1986-2013), appointed Bishop of Marília, São Paulo
- Luiz Carlos Dias (1991-2016), appointed Auxiliary Bishop of São Paulo

== Main churches ==
- Santuário de Adoração Nossa Senhora do Rosário – Mococa-SP
- Santuário do Perpétuo Socorro – São João da Boa Vista-SP
- Santuário Nossa Senhora do Desterro – Casa Branca
- Santuário Nossa Senhora Aparecida – Tambaú-SP
- Santuário Santa Luzia – Espírito Santo do Pinhal – SP
- Basílica Santuário Nossa Senhora da Conceição – Caconde – SP
- Basilica Shrine of Our Lady of the Immaculate Conception, Caconde, Caconde
