= Diocese of Barretos =

Catholic ecclesiastical territory

Coordinates: 20.5578°S 48.5679°W

Diocese of Barretos Dioecesis Barretensis

Catholic
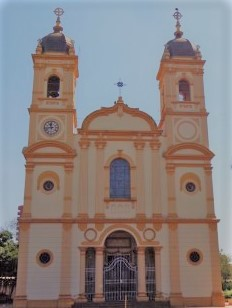
- Catedral Divino Espírito Santo in 2020

Location
- Country: Brazil
- Ecclesiastical province: São José do Rio Preto

Statistics
- Area: 8,767 km^{2} (3,385 sq mi)
- Population: Total; Catholics: (as of 2006); 322,052; 254,969 (79.2%)

Information
- Rite: Latin Rite
- Established: 14 April 1973 (53 years ago)
- Cathedral: Catedral Divino Espírito Santo

Current leadership
- Pope: Leo XIV
- Bishop: Milton Kenan Júnior
- Metropolitan Archbishop: Antônio Emídio Vilar, S.D.B.
- Bishops emeritus: Antônio Gaspar

Map
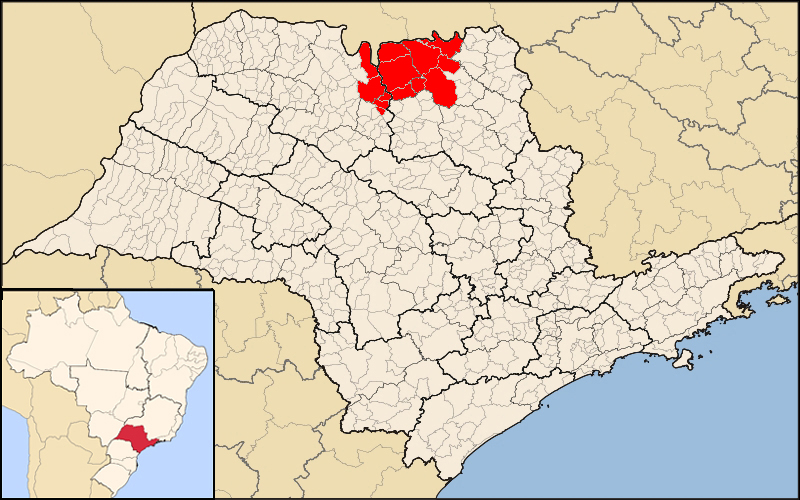

Website
- www.diocesedebarretos.com.br

The Roman Catholic Diocese of Barretos (Latin: Dioecesis Barretensis) is a diocese located in the city of Barretos in the ecclesiastical province of São José do Rio Preto in Brazil.

== History ==
- 14 April 1973: Established as Diocese of Barretos from the Diocese of Jaboticabal and Diocese of Rio Preto

== Leadership ==
- Bishops of Barretos (Latin Rite)
  - José de Matos Pereira, C.M.F. (1973.04.25 – 1976.08.12)
  - Antônio Maria Mucciolo (1977.05.26 – 1989.05.30), appointed Archbishop of Botucatu, São Paulo
  - Pedro Fré, C.Ss.R. (1989.12.02 – 2000.12.20)
  - Antônio Gaspar (2000.12.20 – 2008.01.09)
  - Edmilson Amador Caetano, O. Cist. (2008.01.09 – 2014.01.29), appointed Bishop of Guarulhos, São Paulo
  - Milton Kenan Júnior (2014.11.05 - ...)
