= Basilica Shrine of Our Lady of the Immaculate Conception, Caconde =

Coordinates: 21.5304°S 46.6445°W

Basilica Shrine of Our Lady of the Immaculate Conception
- Basílica Santuário de Nossa Senhora da Conceição do Bom Sucesso
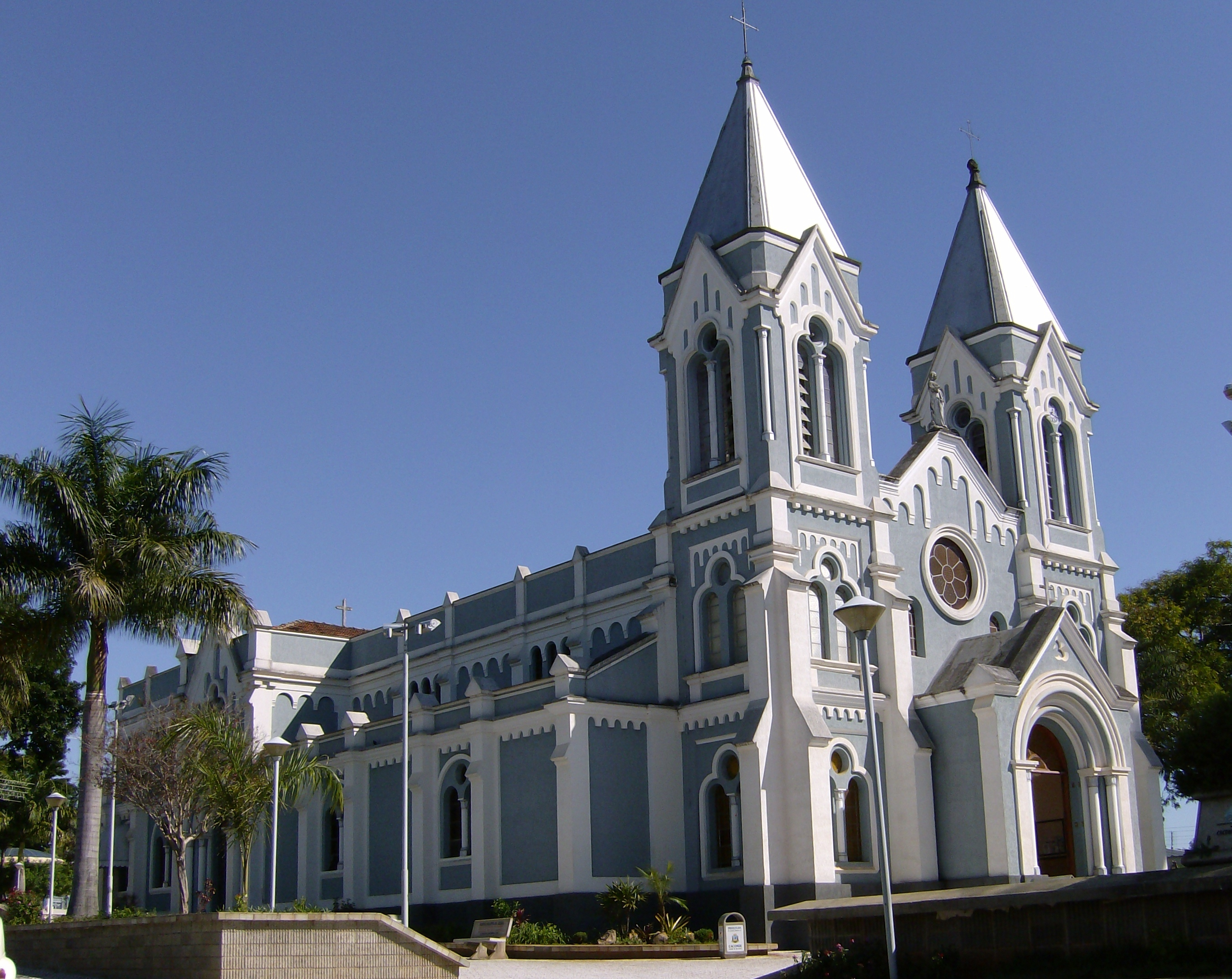
- Basilica Shrine of Our Lady of the Immaculate Conception
- Location: Caconde
- Country: Brazil
- Denomination: Roman Catholic Church

Administration
- Diocese: Roman Catholic Diocese of São João da Boa Vista

The Basilica Shrine of Our Lady of the Immaculate Conception (Portuguese: Basílica Santuário de Nossa Senhora da Conceição do Bom Sucesso), also known as the Basilica Sanctuary of Our Lady of the Conception, is a temple and seat of the Roman Catholic Diocese of São João da Boa Vista in Brazil. It is under the jurisdiction of the Catholic Church in the municipality of Caconde, in the northwest region of the state of São Paulo. It is the second oldest parish of the Diocese of Boa Vista and is dedicated to Our Lady of Good Success, having been created on March 19, 1775, by order of Manuel da Resurreição, third bishop of São Paulo.

The church of Caconde has undergone several reforms. Its elevation to sanctuary dates from December 7, 2004, by decree of the diocesan Bishop David Pimentel Dias, bishop of São João da Boa Vista. And since October 26, 2006, he now has a perpetual "Vinculi Adfinitatis spiritalis" (affinity of spiritual union) with the sacrosanct and papal basilica of Saint Mary Major of Rome, for which he can grant Plenary Indulgences of the same Form that basilica. The sanctuary was elevated to the dignity of Basilica Minor, on August 12, 2008, by Pope Benedict XVI.

== See also ==
- Roman Catholicism in Brazil
- Our Lady of the Immaculate Conception

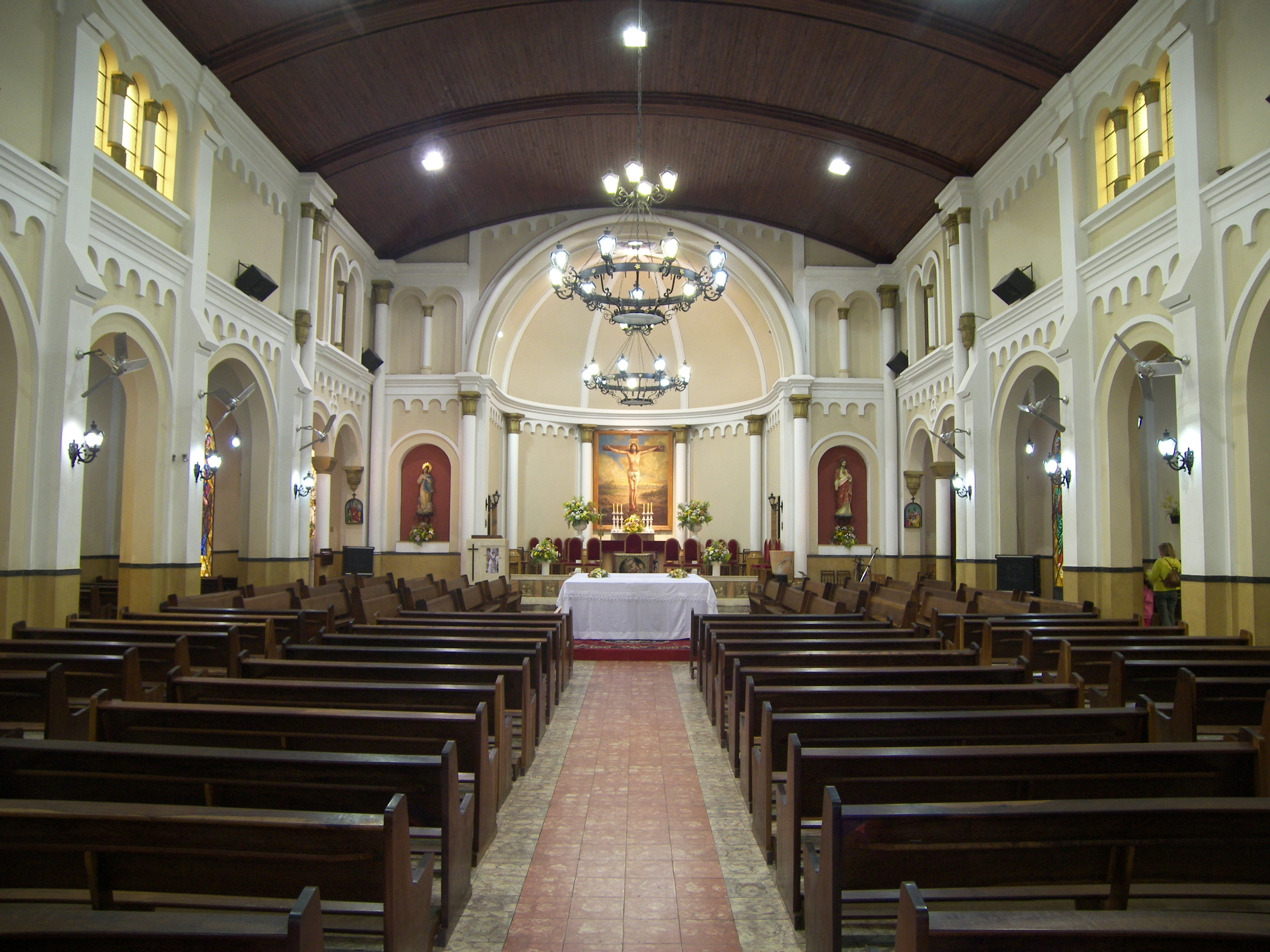
Internal View
