= PICAO =

PICAO or Picao may refer to:

- Picão, a settlement in the northeastern part of Príncipe Island in São Tomé and Príncipe
- David Picão (1923-2009), Brazilian bishop
- Provisional International Civil Aviation Organization, which became the International Civil Aviation Organization in 1947.
