= XFarm Technologies =

Swiss agricultural technology company

xFarm Technologies
- Type: Private company
- Founded: 2017 as xFarm; 2021 as xFarm Technologies
- CEO: Matteo Vanotti
- Headquarters: Manno, Switzerland
- Industry: Agricultural technology
- Products: xFarm platform, IoT sensors
- Website: xfarm.ag
- Main markets: Switzerland, Italy, Spain, France, United Kingdom, Brazil

xFarm Technologies is a Swiss company with headquarters in Manno, operating in the agricultural technology sector. It develops digital farm management tools used by farmers and agri-food supply chain operators, including farm management software (xFarm), Internet of Things (IoT) field sensors, decision support systems (DSS) and supply chain analytics software.

Founded in 2017 as xFarm by Matteo Vanotti, xFarm Technologies took its current form in 2021, following the merger with the Italian company Farm Technologies. Between 2019 and 2024, the company raised funding in three rounds of €3 million, €17 million, €36 million, and it expanded internationally, acquiring Greenfield Technologies (Spain) and SpaceSense (France) in 2024, and Checkplant (Brazil) in 2025.

At the time of the Checkplant transaction, the company reported supporting more than 500,000 farms across 8.3 million hectares. Since July 2025, xFarm Technologies has been a certified B Corporation.

== History and international expansion ==
Matteo Vanotti, who serves as the company's chief executive officer, founded xFarm in 2017 to support the management of his family's farm in Monferrato, Piedmont. In 2019, the company closed a €3 million funding round led by United Ventures.

In 2021, xFarm merged with Farm Technologies, an Italian company developing agronomic algorithms, thus becoming xFarm Technologies. At the time, the company reportedly supported around 80,000 farms across one million hectares.

In 2022, xFarm Technologies closed a €17 million Series B round led by Swisscom Ventures. At the time, the company was active in Switzerland, Italy and Spain, where it had local branches.

In April 2024, the company acquired both SpaceSense, a French company specializing in geospatial artificial intelligence and satellite-based climate intelligence, and Greenfield Technologies, a Spanish company active in soil characterization.

In October 2024, xFarm Technologies closed a €36 million Series C round led by Partech with existing and new investors, including Mouro Capital, the venture arm of Banco Santander, linked to the creation of a fintech and insurtech division dedicated to risk and credit management services for farmers.

In March 2025, xFarm Technologies officially entered the Latin America market through the acquisition of Checkplant, a Brazilian company operating the Farmbox platform in Brazil, Colombia and Paraguay.

== Products and services ==
xFarm Technologies develops xFarm, a farm management platform available as both a mobile and a web application, supporting agronomic, administrative, economic and environmental management of farms. The company also provides a line of IoT devices, including weather stations, soil moisture sensors and leaf wetness sensors, complementing the software and feeding data into forecasting models and DSS. In addition, xFarm Technologies provides satellite imagery for remote field monitoring.

In December 2025, the company launched an artificial intelligence assistant available via the WhatsApp messaging service and connected to the xFarm platform, allowing farmers to record field operations through text or voice messages, and receive alerts on weather conditions, insect attacks and plant disease risks.

=== Supply chain projects ===
xFarm Technologies developed the Barilla Farming platform for the soft wheat supply chain behind Barilla's Mulino Bianco products, involving 2,600 farms in Italy, France, Austria and Eastern Europe in the traceability project. In 2024, a new collaboration started on the basil supply chain used for Barilla's pesto, involving 25 supplying farms and cooperatives across 310 hectares.

Other projects include the digitalization of the Granlatte dairy chain for Granarolo, covering around 600 farms, gathering herd data, supporting feed crop planning and sustainability assessments, and a supply chain digitalization program with the rice producer Riso Gallo. The company took part in the Agrometeo monitoring project with Conserve Italia and the University of Bologna, with the installation of 600 sensors across 700 hectares of orchards to support irrigation and crop protection decisions, and a project for the tomato processor Tomato Farm, involving 200 growers.

The xFarm platform was also used by Lavazza, combined with blockchain technology, in a traceability pilot on two coffee farms in Brazil.

=== Other collaborations ===
In 2023, xFarm Technologies signed an agreement with the fertilizer producer Yara for the development of digital tools for nutrient use efficiency. In the same year, the company entered a three-year project with Dyson Farming in the United Kingdom, to collect and process farm operations data. In 2024, xFarm Technologies joined Bunge's regenerative agriculture program in Brazil, providing farmers with field sensors and DSS fed by the resulting data.

== Awards and recognition ==
In 2022, xFarm Technologies entered the Top 100 Swiss Startup Award ranking. In December 2024, it was named Startup of the Year at SIOS24 Winter organized by StartupItalia. In 2025, it was ranked 37th in the Sifted 100: DACH & CEE leaderboard.

== See also ==
- Precision agriculture
- Digital agriculture
- Decision support system
- Internet of Things
