= Diocese of Porto Nacional =

Catholic ecclesiastical territory

Diocese of Porto Nacional Dioecesis Portus Nationalis

Catholic
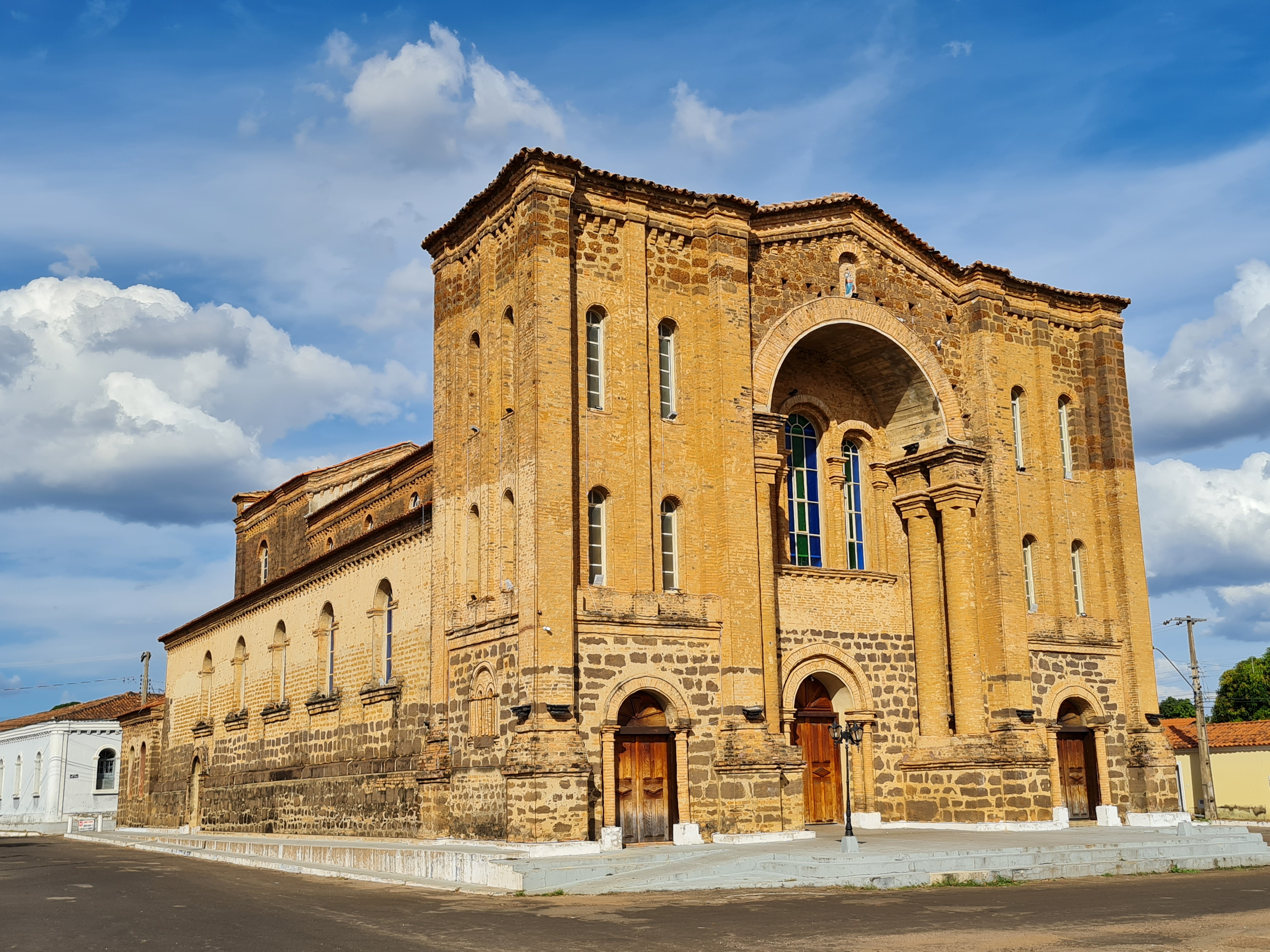
- Cathedral Nossa Senhora das Mercês

Location
- Country: Brazil
- Ecclesiastical province: Palmas

Statistics
- Area: 96,488 km^{2} (37,254 sq mi)
- Population: Total; Catholics: (as of 2004); 319,861; 276,000 (86.3%)

Information
- Rite: Latin Rite
- Established: 20 December 1915 (110 years ago)
- Cathedral: Catedral Nossa Senhora das Mercês

Current leadership
- Pope: Leo XIV
- Bishop: sede vacante
- Metropolitan Archbishop: Pedro Brito Guimarães
- Bishops emeritus: Geraldo Vieira Gusmão

The Roman Catholic Diocese of Porto Nacional (Latin: Dioecesis Portus Nationalis) is a diocese located in the city of Porto Nacional in the ecclesiastical province of Palmas in Brazil.

== History ==
- 20 December 1915: Established as Diocese of Porto Nacional from the Diocese of Goiás

== Bishops ==
- Bishops of Porto Nacional (Roman rite)
  - Raymond Dominique Carrerot, O.P. † (30 July 1920 – 14 December 1933) Died
  - Alain Marie Hubert Antoine Jean Roland du Noday, O.P. † (21 March 1936 – 5 May 1976) Retired
  - Celso Pereira de Almeida, O.P. (5 May 1976 – 25 January 1995) Appointed, Bishop of Itumbiara
  - Geraldo Vieira Gusmão (23 December 1997 – 4 November 2009) Retired
  - Romualdo Matias Kujawski (4 November 2009 – 14 December 2022)
  - José Moreira da Silva (14 December 2022 – 1 June 2026)

=== Coadjutor bishops ===
- Celso Pereira de Almeida, O.P. (1975–1976)
- Romualdo Matias Kujawski (2008–2009)

=== Auxiliary bishop ===
- Celso Pereira de Almeida, O.P. (1972–1975), appointed Coadjutor here

=== Other priest of this diocese who became bishop ===
- José Moreira da Silva, appointed Bishop of Januária, Minas Gerais in 2008
