= David Dias Pimentel =

Portuguese bishop (1941–2021)

His Eminence David Dias Pimentel
- Bishop of São João da Boa Vista
- Church: Roman Catholic Church
- Appointed: 7 February 2001
- Installed: 25 March 2001
- Term ended: 28 September 2016
- Predecessor: Dadeus Grings
- Successor: Antônio Emídio Vilar
- Other post: Auxiliary Bishop of Belo Horizonte

Orders
- Ordination: 21 December 1969
- Consecration: 31 January 1997

Personal details
- Born: 18 March 1941 Algarvia, Portugal
- Died: 16 March 2021 (aged 79) São João da Boa Vista, São Paulo, Brazil

David Dias Pimentel (March 18, 1941 – March 16, 2021) was a Portuguese bishop living in Brazil since his youth. His last pastoral work was that of Bishop Emeritus of São João da Boa Vista, São Paulo.

== Biography ==
Dom David was born in the Archipelago of the Azores, son of João Dias Pimentel and Arminda de Jesus Costa, being the youngest among ten brothers. His studies were carried out in his native land, and at the age of thirteen he entered the Consolata Seminary, in Fátima. In 1960, he came with his family to Brazil and in Botucatu Pimentel went to high school (currently high school).

In 1963 he began his studies in philosophy at the Central Seminary of Ipiranga and in 1965, Theology, at the Pontifical Gregorian University, in Rome. Pimentel was ordained a priest on December 21, 1969, in the city of São José do Rio Preto, serving for sixteen years, in various diocesan positions, as rector of the seminary, parish priest in Nhandeara, São José do Rio Preto, Cedral and Monte Aprazível, coordinator diocesan pastoral, seminary professor and member of the council of priests.

In 1986, Pimentel was transferred to Guarulhos, where he was parish priest of Jardim Munhoz and of the Cathedral Nossa Senhora da Conceição, being part of the pastoral coordination and the council of elders. In 1991, during the vacant seat, he was diocesan administrator and later vicar general of the diocese. He served in the Diocese of Guarulhos for eight years.

In early 1995, he returned to the Diocese of São José do Rio Preto, to occupy the position of rector and professor of the major seminary Sacred Heart of Jesus and on December 11, 1996, Pimentel was appointed by Pope John Paul II, auxiliary bishop of Belo Horizonte.

On January 31, 1997, Pimentel received the episcopal ordination in São José do Rio Preto from Dom Serafim Fernandes de Araújo, Archbishop of Belo Horizonte and his co-consecrators were Dom José de Aquino Pereira, Bishop of Rio Preto and Dom Luiz Gonzaga Bergonzini, bishop of Guarulhos.

On February 7, 2001, he was appointed bishop of São João da Boa Vista. In August 2015 Pimentel had a stroke, which left him with limited mobility, and dependent on the help of seven priests for the administration of the Diocese; with that, he announced his request to resign from Pope Francis.

On March 8, 2021, he was admitted to the ICU of Hospital Maternidade da Unimed, in São João da Boa Vista, after contracting COVID-19, requiring his intubation on March 14. Pimentel died of complications from the disease two days later, on March 16. As a result of the ongoing COVID-19 pandemic, his funeral was celebrated only with the clergy of the diocese and family members of the bishop in the Cathedral of São João da Boa Vista. His burial was also carried out in the cathedral.
