= Diocese of Catanduva =

Catholic ecclesiastical territory

Coordinates: 21.1288°S 48.9698°W

Diocese of Catanduva Dioecesis Catanduvensis

Catholic
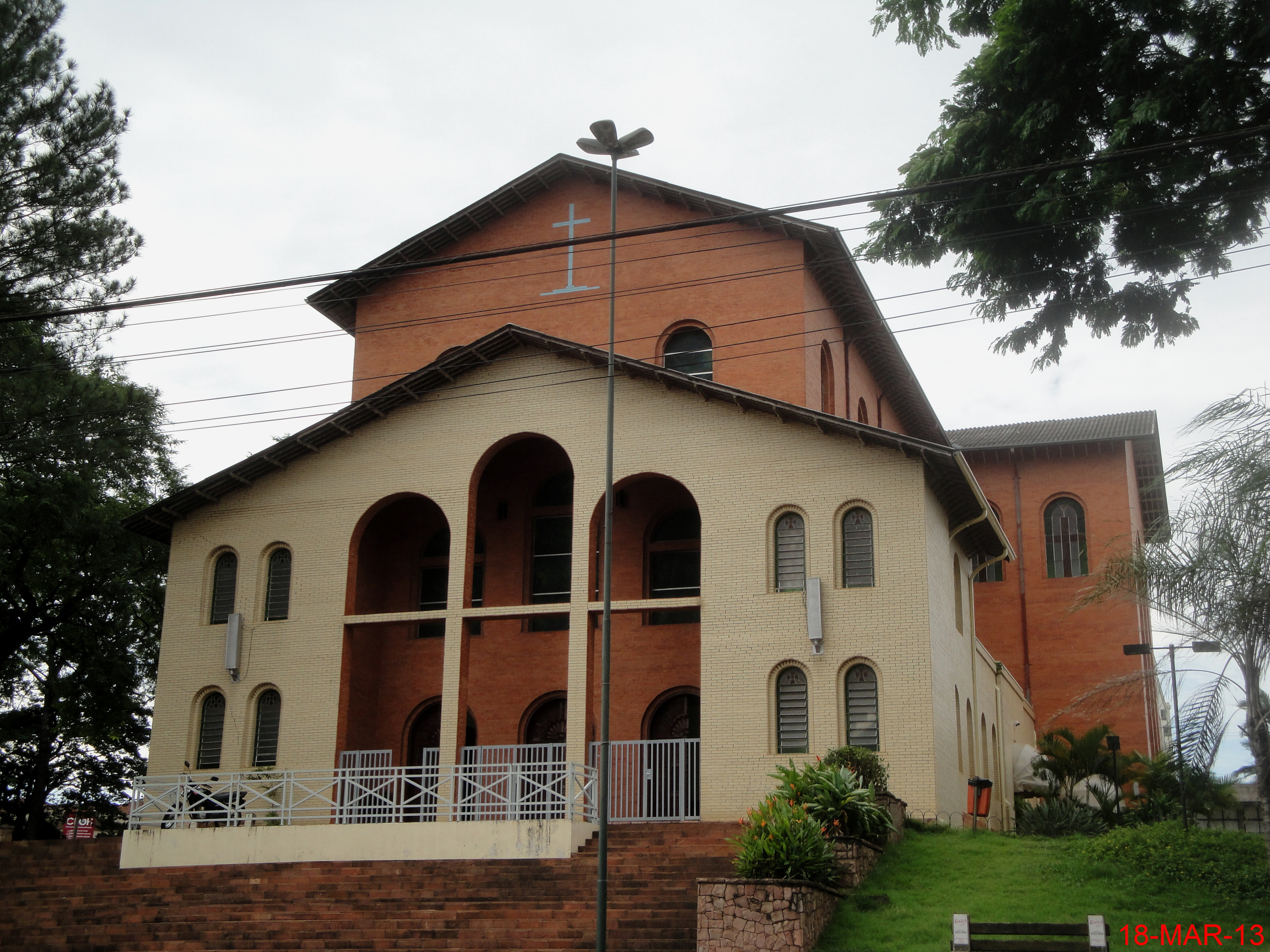
- Catedral Santuário Nossa Senhora Aparecida

Location
- Country: Brazil
- Ecclesiastical province: São José do Rio Preto

Statistics
- Area: 4,601 km^{2} (1,776 sq mi)
- Population: Total; Catholics: (as of 2004); 266,455; 206,089 (77.3%)

Information
- Denomination: Catholic Church
- Rite: Latin Rite
- Established: 9 February 2000 (26 years ago)
- Cathedral: Catedral Santuário Nossa Senhora Aparecida

Current leadership
- Pope: Leo XIV
- Bishop: José Benedito Cardoso
- Metropolitan Archbishop: Antônio Emídio Vilar, S.D.B.
- Bishops emeritus: Otacílio Luziano Da Silva; Valdir Mamede

Map
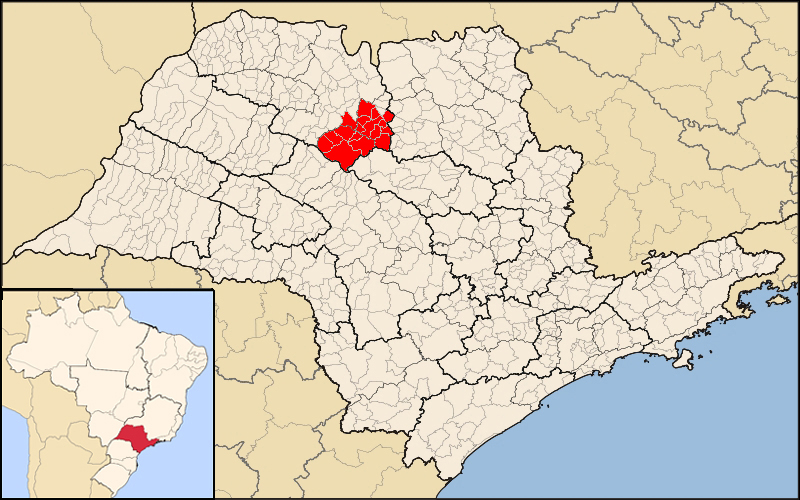

Website
- www.diocesedecatanduva.org.br

The Roman Catholic Diocese of Catanduva (Latin: Dioecesis Catanduvensis) is a diocese located in the city of Catanduva in the ecclesiastical province of São José do Rio Preto in Brazil.

== History ==
- 9 February 2000: Established as Diocese of Catanduva from the Diocese of Jaboticabal, Diocese of Rio Preto and Diocese of São Carlos

== Leadership ==
- Bishops of Catanduva (Roman rite)
  - Antônio Celso Queiroz (9 Feb 2000 - 21 Oct 2009)
  - Otacílio Luziano Da Silva (21 Oct 2009 - 10 Oct 2019)
  - Valdir Mamede (10 July 2019 - 1 November 2023)
  - José Benedito Cardoso (4 January 2024 - ...)
