= Granarolo (disambiguation) =

Granarolo is an Italian food company.

Granarolo may also refer to:

- Granarolo Bologna, an Italian professional basketball club based in Bologna, Italy
- Granarolo dell'Emilia, a municipality in the Metropolitan City of Bologna, Italy
