= Celso Pereira de Almeida =

Brazilian Catholic bishop

Celso Pereira de Almeida O.P.
- Bishop of Itumbiara
- Church: Catholic Church
- Diocese: Diocese of Itumbiara
- In office: 25 January 1995 – 6 May 1998
- Predecessor: José Carlos Castanho de Almeida
- Successor: Antônio Lino da Silva Dinis
- Previous posts: Bishop of Porto Nacional (1976-1995); Coadjutor Bishop of Porto Nacional (1975-1976); Titular Bishop of Camplum (1972-1976); Auxiliary Bishop of Porto Nacional (1972-1975)

Orders
- Ordination: 4 August 1953
- Consecration: 22 April 1972 by Fernando Gomes dos Santos

Personal details
- Born: 7 March 1928 Santa Cruz do Rio Pardo, São Paulo, Republic of the United States of Brazil
- Died: 11 May 2014 (aged 86)

Celso Pereira de Almeida (7 March 1928 – 11 May 2014) was a Brazilian Catholic bishop.

Ordained to the priesthood in 1953, Pereira de Almeida was appointed auxiliary bishop of the Diocese of Porto Nacional in 1972. He was appointed coadjutor bishop of the same diocese in 1975 and became Bishop there in 1976. In 1995, he was appointed bishop of the Diocese of Itumbiara.

Pereira de Almeida resigned in 1998.
