= Antônio Fernando Brochini =

Brazilian Roman Catholic prelate (1946–2024)

His Excellency Antônio Fernando Brochini C.S.S.
- Bishop Emeritus of Itumbiara
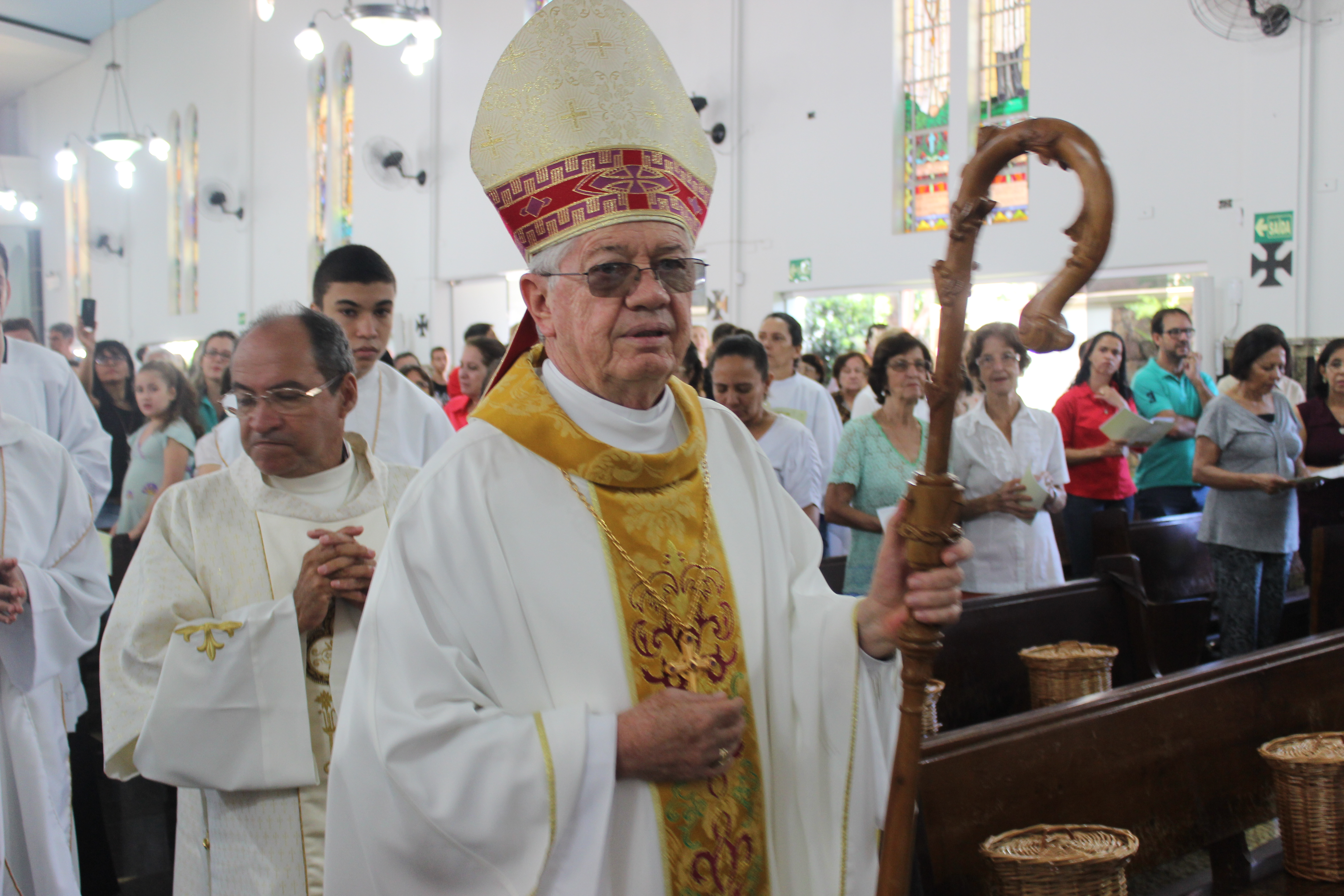
- Metropolis: Goiânia
- Installed: 12 December 2001
- Term ended: 13 July 2023
- Predecessor: Antônio Lino da Silva Dinis
- Successor: José Aparecido Gonçalves de Almeida
- Previous post: Bishop of Jaboticabal

Orders
- Ordination: 8 December 1973
- Consecration: 3 March 2002 by Luíz Eugênio Pérez

Personal details
- Born: 10 November 1946 Rio Claro, São Paulo, Brazil
- Died: 15 March 2024 (aged 77) Uberlândia, Brazil
- Motto: Testimonium communionis
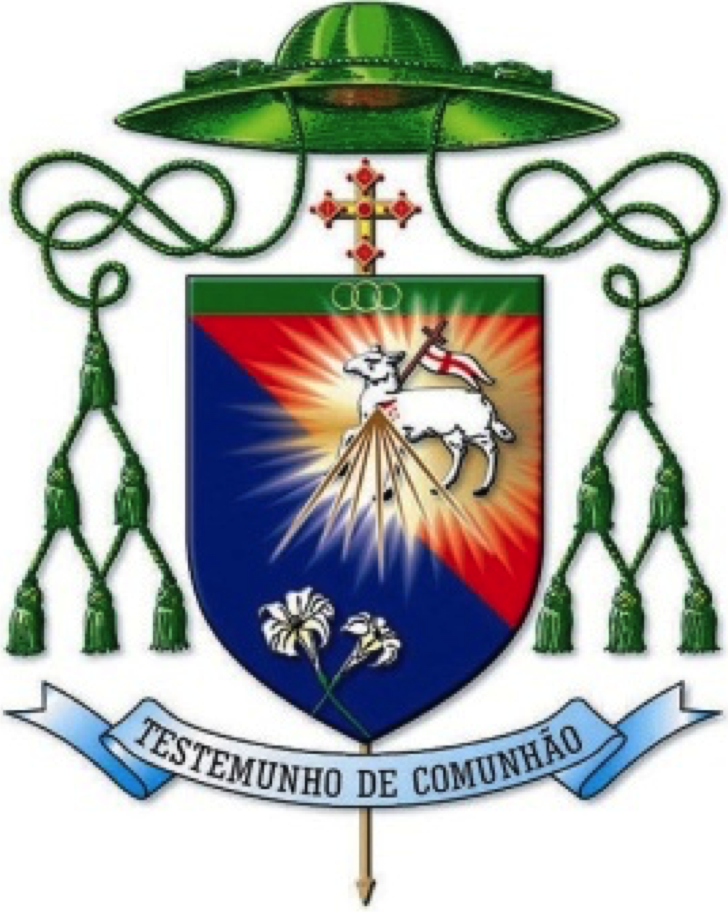
- Coat of arms

Antônio Fernando Brochini (10 November 1946 – 15 March 2024) was a Brazilian Roman Catholic prelate. He was bishop of Jaboticabal from 2003 to 2014 and bishop of Itumbiara from 2014 to 2023.

Catholic Church titles
Preceded by Luíz Eugênio Pérez	Bishop of Jaboticabal; 2003–2014	Succeeded by Eduardo Pinheiro da Silva
Preceded by Antônio Lino da Silva Dinis	Bishop of Itumbiara; 2014–2023	Succeeded by José Aparecido Gonçalves de Almeida
