= Luíz Eugênio Pérez =

Luiz Eugênio Perez
- Bishop of Jaboticabal
- Church: Catholic Church
- Diocese: Diocese of Jaboticabal
- In office: 7 June 1981 – 25 June 2003
- Predecessor: José Varani
- Successor: Antônio Fernando Brochini
- Previous post: Bishop of Jales (1970-1981)

Orders
- Ordination: 8 December 1954
- Consecration: 11 June 1970 by Umberto Mozzoni

Personal details
- Born: 5 May 1928 Orlândia, São Paulo, Republic of the United States of Brazil
- Died: 14 November 2012 (aged 84)

Luíz Eugênio Pérez (5 May 1928 – 14 November 2012) was the Catholic bishop of the Diocese of Jaboticabal, Brazil.

Ordained to the priesthood in 1954, Pérez was named bishop in 1970 and retired in 2003.
