= Diocese of Santos =

Catholic ecclesiastical territory

Diocese of Santos Dioecesis Santosensis

Catholic
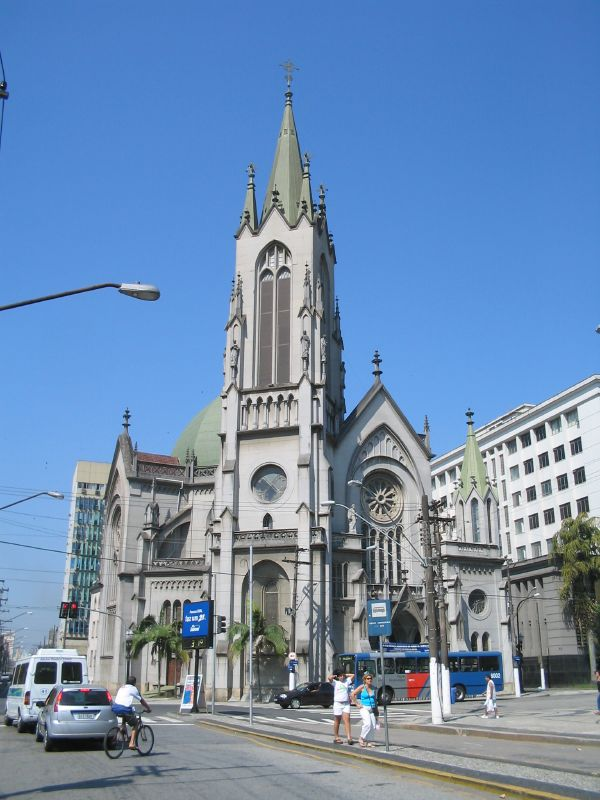
- Our Lady of the Rosary Cathedral, Santos

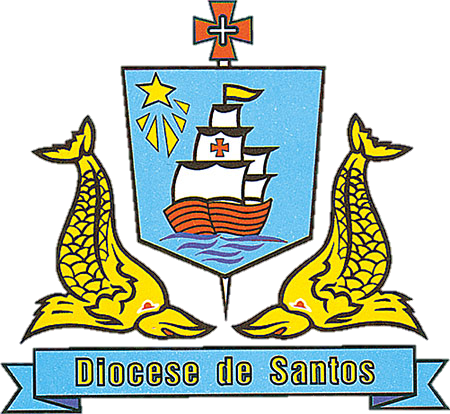
- Coat of arms

Location
- Country: Brazil
- Ecclesiastical province: São Paulo

Statistics
- Area: 2,369 km^{2} (915 sq mi)
- Population: Total; Catholics: (as of 2004); 1,530,874; 1,310,551 (85.6%)

Information
- Rite: Latin Rite
- Established: 4 July 1924 (102 years ago)
- Cathedral: Catedral Nossa Senhora do Rosário
- Patron saint: Our Lady of the Rosary

Current leadership
- Pope: Leo XIV
- Bishop: Tarcísio Scaramussa (until Wednesday, May 6, 2015, when Pope Francis accepted Bishop Braido's resignation, he was Coadjutor Bishop of Santos under Bishop Braido)
- Metropolitan Archbishop: Odilo Scherer
- Bishops emeritus: Jacyr Francisco Braido, C.S.

Map
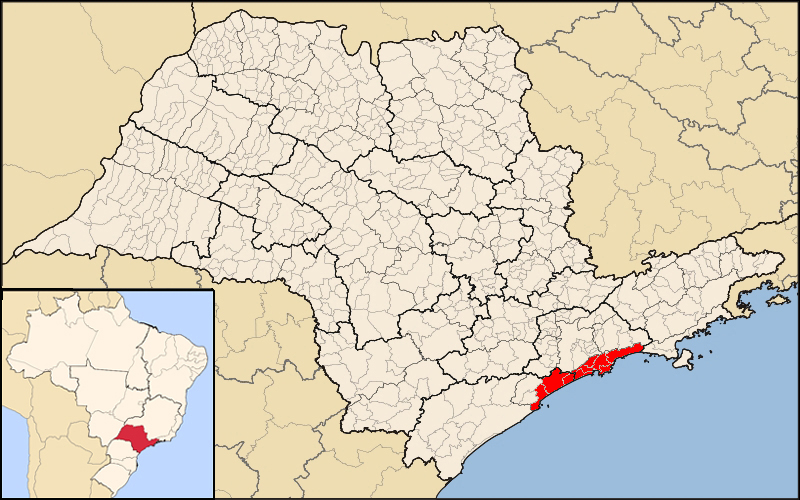

Website
- www.diocesedesantos.com.br

The Roman Catholic Diocese of Santos (Latin: Dioecesis Santosensis) is a diocese located in the city of Santos in the ecclesiastical province of São Paulo in Brazil.

== History ==
- 4 July 1924: Established as Diocese of Santos from the Metropolitan Archdiocese of São Paulo
- 12 April 2024: Pope Francis decrees through the Dicastery for Divine Worship and the Discipline of the Sacraments, proclaiming the Blessed Virgin Mary as "Our Lady of the Rosary" as the patroness of the diocese.

== Special churches ==
- Minor Basilicas:
  - Basílica Santo Antônio do Embaré

== Bishops ==
- Bishops of Santos (Roman rite), in reverse chronological order
  - Bishop Tarcísio Scaramussa, S.D.B. (2015.05.06 – present); formerly, Coadjutor Bishop of the Diocese under Bishop Braido
  - Bishop Jacyr Francisco Braido, C.S. (2000.07.26 – 2015.05.06)
  - Bishop David Picão (1966.11.21 – 2000.07.26)
  - Bishop Idílio José Soares (1943.06.12 – 1966.11.21)
  - Bishop Paulo de Tarso Campos (1935.06.01 - 1941.12.14), appointed Bishop of Campinas; future Archbishop
  - Bishop José Maria Perreira Lara (1924.12.18 – 1934.09.28), appointed Bishop of Caratinga, Minas Gerais

=== Coadjutor bishops ===
- David Picão (1963-1966)
- Jacyr Francisco Braido, C.S. (1995-2000)
- Tarcísio Scaramussa, S.D.B. (2014-2015)

=== Auxiliary bishops ===
- Walmor Battú Wichrowski (1958-1960), appointed Bishop of Nova Iguaçu, Rio de Janeiro
- José Carlos Castanho de Almeida (1982-1987), appointed Bishop of Itumbiara, Goias
