= Jales =

- Municipality
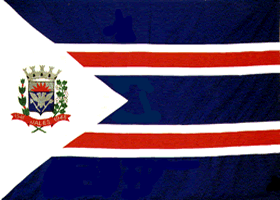
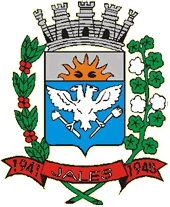
- Flag Coat of arms

- Location of Jales

- Location within Brazil
- Coordinates: 20°16′08″S 50°32′45″W
- Country: Brazil
- Region: Southeast
- State: São Paulo
- Mesoregion: São José do Rio Preto
- Established: 2013

Government
  - Mayor: Flavio Prandi Franco (DEM)

Area
  - Total: 368.5 km^{2} (142.3 sq mi)
- Elevation: 478 m (1,568 ft)

Population (2020)
  - Total: 49,201
  - Density: 127.57/km^{2} (330.4/sq mi)
- Time zone: UTC-3 (UTC-3)
  - Summer (DST): UTC-2 (UTC-2)
- Postal Code: 15700-000
- Area code: +55 17
- 'HDI (UNDP/2000): 0.804 – high
- Website: Prefecture of Jales, São Paulo

Jales is a municipality in the state of São Paulo, Brazil. The population in 2020, according to the IBGE, is 49,201 inhabitants. The city is located 601 km from the city of São Paulo.

It is the seat of the Roman Catholic Diocese of Jales.

== History ==
The city was founded on April 15, 1941 and the municipality was created by state law in 1948.

Map of the state of São Paulo (1948).

== Demographics ==
Historical population (municipality)
Year	Population	%±
1950	32,048	—
1960	36,457	13.8%
1970	38,436	5.4%
1980	38,601	0.4%
1991	45,956	19.1%
2000	46,186	0.5%
2010	47,012	1.8%
2022	48,776	3.8%

=== Statistics ===
- Area: 368.5 km^{2}
- Population density: 127.57/km² (IBGE/2010) - 222.90/km² (SEADE/2011)
- Urbanization: 94.1% (2010)
- Sex ratio (Males to Females): 95.4 (2011)
- Birth rate: 10.77/1,000 inhab. (2009)
- Infant mortality: 15.8/1,000 births (2009)
- Homicide rate: 4.0/100 thousand ppl (2008)
- HDI: 0.804 (UNDP/2000)

All statistics are from SEADE and IBGE.

== Economy ==
The Tertiary sector corresponds to 72.6% of the Jales GDP. Industry has a participation of 23,51%, and the Primary sector corresponds to 3.89% of the GDP.

== Media ==
In telecommunications, the city was served by Telecomunicações de São Paulo. In July 1998, this company was acquired by Telefónica, which adopted the Vivo brand in 2012. The company is currently an operator of cell phones, fixed lines, internet (fiber optics/4G) and television (satellite and cable).

== Notable people ==
- Régis, football player

== See also ==
- List of municipalities in São Paulo
- Interior of São Paulo
