= José Aparecido Gonçalves de Almeida =

Brazilian bishop

- Bishop of Itumbiara
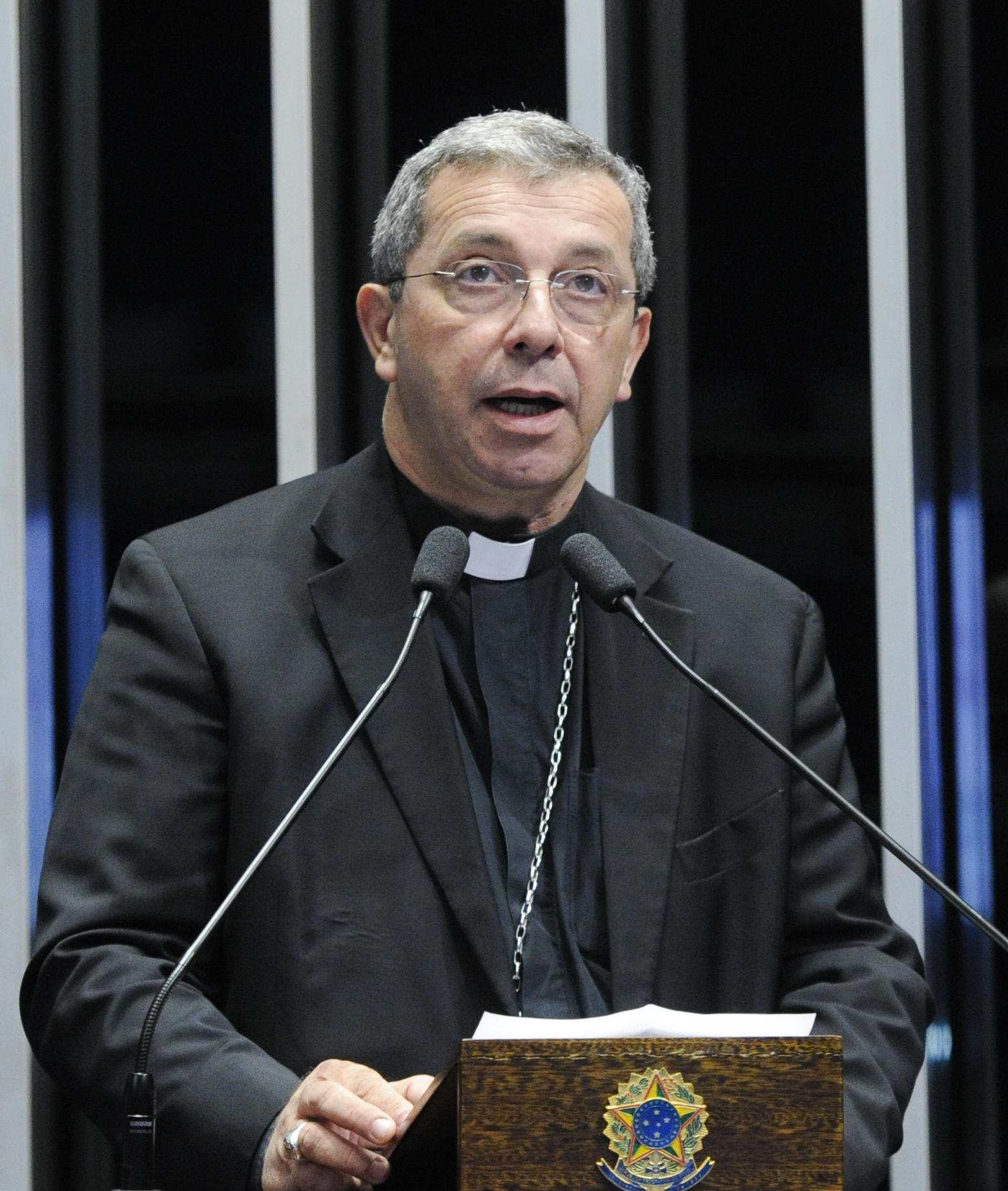
- José Aparecido Gonçalves de Almeida in 2018
- Church: Catholic Church
- Diocese: Diocese of Itumbiara
- Appointed: 13 July 2023
- Predecessor: Antônio Fernando Brochini
- Previous posts: Titular Bishop of Enera (2013-2023); Administrator of Brasília (2020); Auxiliary Bishop of Brasília (2013-2023)

Orders
- Ordination: 21 December 1986
- Consecration: 13 July 2013 by Sérgio da Rocha

Personal details
- Born: 21 July 1960 (age 65) Ourinhos, São Paulo, United States of Brazil
- Coat of arms

José Aparecido Gonçalves de Almeida (born 21 July 1960) is a Brazilian Roman Catholic bishop. He had previously served as Under-Secretary of the Pontifical Council for Legislative Texts. Gonçalves de Almeida was born in the city of Ourinhos. He felt a vocation to the priesthood. He attended a course in Philosophy at the FAI - "Faculdades Associadas do Ipiranga" in São Paulo (1980-1982) and the Bachelor of Theology at the "Faculdade Nossa Senhora da Assunção," São Paulo (1983-1986). He also holds a Doctorate in Canon Law at the Pontifical University of the Holy Cross. He was ordained on 21 December 1986 at the age of 26 for the Diocese of Santo Amaro.

In the course of his priestly ministry he served as parochial vicar of the parish and then Administrator of the Parish "Santa Cruz" from 1987–1988. He was pastor of the parish of "Nossa Senhora do Socorro Perpétuo" from 1988–1990. He was called to work in the Roman Curia as an official of the Pontifical Council for Legislative Texts from 1994. On 14 June 2010 he was appointed as Under-Secretary by Pope Benedict XVI. He held the office until 8 May 2013 when Pope Francis appointed him Titular Bishop of Enera and Auxiliary Bishop of Brasília.

His episcopal consecration took place on 13 July with Archbishop Sérgio da Rocha as principal consecrator and Bishop Fernando Antônio Figueiredo, O.F.M. of Santo Amaro and Bishop Juan Ignacio Arrieta Ochoa de Chinchetru as principal co-consecrators.
