= Antônio Lino da Silva Dinis =

Brazilian Roman Catholic bishop (1943–2013)

- Bishop of Itumbiara
- Church: Catholic Church
- Diocese: Diocese of Itumbiara
- In office: 24 February 1999 – 1 December 2013
- Predecessor: Celso Pereira de Almeida
- Successor: Antônio Fernando Brochini

Orders
- Ordination: 15 August 1966
- Consecration: 1 May 1999 by Alfio Rapisarda

Personal details
- Born: 22 February 1943 São Mateus de Oliveira (part of present-day Vila Nova de Famalicão), Braga District, Portugal
- Died: 1 December 2013 (aged 70) Goiânia, Goiás, Brazil

Antônio Lino da Silva Dinis (22 February 1943 in São Mateus de Oliveira − 1 December 2013 in Goiânia) was a Portuguese-born Brazilian Roman Catholic bishop.

Ordained to the priesthood on 15 August 1966, Lino da Silva Dinis was named bishop of the Roman Catholic Diocese of Itumbiara, Brazil on 24 February 1999 and died while still in office on 1 December 2013.
