= Tomé Ferreira da Silva =

Tomé Ferreira da Silva OFM
- Bishop Emeritus of São José do Rio Preto
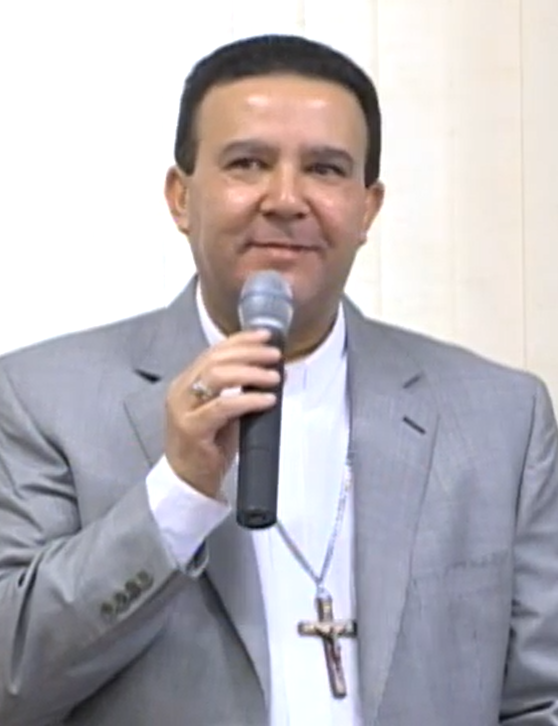
- See: São José do Rio Preto (Emeritus)
- Appointed: 26 September 2012
- Installed: 16 November 2012
- Term ended: 18 August 2021
- Predecessor: Paulo Mendes Peixoto
- Successor: Antônio Emídio Vilar, S.D.B.

Orders
- Ordination: 1 January 1987 by Tarcisio Ariovaldo Amaral
- Consecration: 13 May 2005 by Cláudio Hummes

Personal details
- Born: 17 May 1961 (age 65)

Tomé Ferreira da Silva (born 17 May 1961) was a Roman Catholic prelate and is a priest in the Latin Rite. He was Bishop of the Roman Catholic Diocese of São José do Rio Preto from 16 November 2012 until 18 August 2021. When ordained a bishop, the diocese he led had between 701,000 and 958,000 Roman Catholics, or almost 75% of the population.

== Early life and formation ==
Ferreira da Silva was born on 17 May 1961. The son of Sebastião Ferreira da Silva and Ana Ferreira da Silva, he joined the diocesan seminary Nossa Senhora das Dores in Campanha in 1975. He graduated with a degree in philosophy from the São José diocesan seminary, in Três Corações and in theology at the Sagrado Coração de Jesus Theological Institute, in Taubaté. He also completed undergraduate courses in social studies and history at the Vale do Rio Verde University, in Três Corações. He holds a master's degree in philosophy from the Pontifical Gregorian University in Rome. He was ordained on 1 January 1987.

== Episcopate ==
On 9 March 2005 he was named by Pope John Paul II to be titular Bishop of Giufos and as an auxiliary bishop of Sao Paulo, Brazil. He received his episcopal ordination in the city of Cristina on 13 May of that same year, at the hands of Bishop Cláudio Hummes. He also served as vicar general of the Archdiocese of São Paulo, moderator of the Metropolitan Curia of São Paulo and advisor to the Movements and Lay Associations, catechesis in the Archdiocese of São Paulo and seminars of the Archdiocese and of Vocation Ministry. His episcopal motto is Holiness in Truth and Charity. He was the responsible bishop for the Ipiranga Episcopal Region.

On 26 September 2012 he was named by Pope Benedict XVI to the diocesan bishop of Sao Jose do Rio Preto. He was installed as the ordinary on 16 November 2012.

The Vatican investigated allegations of misconduct against the bishop in 2018, in particular his failure to investigate priests accused of sexual misconduct against children.

== Resignation and removal ==
On 18 August 2021, Pope Francis removed Ferreira da Silva as bishop after a sexual scandal, when he submitted his resignation to the Pope. On 13 August 2021, a video leaked to the public "in which he is seen semi-naked with another man." Ferreira da Silva admitted publicly that the video was authentic and had been taped by him. The bishop claims it was leaked by someone he knew.

Ferreira da Silva was replaced by Moacir Silva, archbishop of Ribeirao Preto as apostolic administrator sede vacante.

Catholic Church titles
Preceded by Paulo Mendes Peixoto	Bishop of São José do Rio Preto; 26 September 2012-18 August 2021	Succeeded by Antônio Emídio Vilar, S.D.B.
