= Luiz Castanho de Almeida =

Luiz Castanho de Almeida (November 6, 1904 in Guareí - February 28, 1981, in Sorocaba) was a priest, historian and writer. Son of Colonel Anibal Castanho de Almeida and Ana Candida Rolim. He published several books under the pseudonym of Aluisio de Almeida. In 1918, he entered the seminary and attended Philosophy and Theology. Was ordered a priest on May 8, 1927, the Sorocaba Metropolitan Cathedral. After serving as a priest in Itararé, Itapetininga and Guareí in 1933 moved to Sorocaba, where he moved and took over the parish of "Bom Jesus dos Aflitos", in the neighborhood Alem-ponte, Sorocaba. Between 1940 and 1944, he was rector of the diocesan Minor Seminary of São Carlos Borromeu of Sorocaba. He became nationally known for articles that discuss folklore, customs, history, biography, and religion. He worked devotedly for the preservation of memory of Sorocaba. He left some 22 books published and unpublished, which are on file of the Historical, Geographical and Genealogical Institute of Sorocaba - Ihggs, located in the "House of Aluisio de Almeida." The library of the University of Sorocaba takes its name.

== Bibliography ==
- A Diocese de Sorocaba e o seu primeiro Bispo. Sorocaba. 1974.
- A revolução liberal de 1842. Coleção Documentos Brasileiros. Livraria José Olympio Editora. RJ. 1944.
- Contos do povo brasileiro. Editora Vozes Ltda. Petrópolis, RJ. 1949.
- Dom Lúcio. 2ª ed. Editora Vozes Ltda. 1956.
- História de Sorocaba. I Volume (1589–1822) Sorocaba. 1951.
- História de Sorocaba. Instituto Histórico de Sorocaba. 1969.
- História de Sorocaba para crianças. 1ª ed. Instituto de Ciências e Letras de Sorocaba. 1968.
- História de Sorocaba para crianças. 2ª ed. Prefeitura Municipal de Sorocaba. 1980.
- Luiz Matheus Maylasky, Visconde de Sapucaí (em colaboração com Antônio Francisco Gaspar) São Paulo. 1938.
- Sorocaba, 1842. São Paulo. 1938.
- O sacerdote Diogo Antônio Feijó. Editora Vozes Ltda. 1951.
- O tropeirismo e a feira de Sorocaba. Sorocaba. 1968.
- Velhas e novas anedotas. Editora Vozes Ltda. 1953.
- Vida e morte do tropeiro. 2ª ed. Livraria Martins Editora Edusp. São Paulo. 1981.
- 50 Contos populares de São Paulo. 1ª ed. Sorocaba. 1947.
- 50 contos populares de São Paulo 2ª ed. Conselho estadual de Cultura. São Paulo. 1973.
- Brasil de Nossa Senhora
- Campina do Monte Alegre
