= Enera =

Africa Proconsularis (125 AD).

Enera was a Roman–Berber civitas (town) in the province of Numidia. It is believed to have been located in modern Algeria. The town was also a former Roman Catholic diocese.

The only known bishop of this bishopric was Massimino, who took part in the Council of Carthage (411). Enera is now a titular bishopric. Its current bishop is José Aparecido Gonçalves de Almeida, of Brasília.
