= Granarolo =

Italian food company

Granarolo S.p.A.
- Type: Joint-stock company
- Industry: Food
- Founded: 1957 in Bologna
- Headquarters: Italy
- Number of locations: 21 production plants (13 Italy, 2 France, 1 Germany, 3 Brazil, 1 USA, 1 New Zealand)
- Areas served: 90 countries
- Key people: Stanislao Fabbrino (Chairman); Filippo Marchi (General Director)
- Products: Milk and dairy products, vegetable specialities.
- Revenue: € 1.813 billion € (2025)
- Net income: € 5,5 million (2025)
- Number of employees: 2,625 (2025)
- Subsidiaries: 14 branches (France, United Kingdom, Sweden, Switzerland, Poland, Estonia, Belgium/Luxemburg, Germany, Greece, USA, Brazil, Chile, New Zealand, China) + 1 commercial offices (Spain)
- Website: granarologroup.com

Granarolo S.p.A. is a food company in Italy founded in 1957 and based in Bologna. It operates in the dairy sector (milk, yoghurt, desserts, fresh cream and long-life cream, fresh and hard cheeses, and milk-based baby food).

== History ==
=== 1957: "The Granarolo" is launched ===
In 1957, the Bologna Consortium of Milk Producers (CBPL) was founded in Granarolo dell’Emilia (BO), with the aim of producing, processing and marketing milk, and it took the name "Granarolo" as its trademark for marketing its milk.

=== 1970s: CERPL, the first Italian unitary consortium ===
In 1972, the Felsinea Latte Cooperative joined the consortium, giving rise to the Consorzio Emiliano-Romagnolo Produttori Latte (CERPL) which was immediately joined by the Cooperativa Latte Estense of Ferrara, the Cooperativa Produttori Latte of Forlì, the Cooperativa of Ravenna and the Cooperativa of Rimini.

=== 1980s: Granarolo grows ===
During the 1980s, the Cooperativa Latte Estense of Ferrara and the Cooperativa Produttori Latte of Forlì left the consortium, while at the same time, CERPL was joined by the Consorzio Granterre of Modena, and Daunia Natura of Foggia, Sogecla of Anzio, and the Cooperativa Latte Verbano of Novara (the latter went bankrupt in 1992) were acquired.

=== 1990s: the Granlatte Cooperative and Granarolo S.p.A. ===
Under the guidance of Luciano Sita, who was appointed president in 1991, in 1992, the Group launched the Granarolo Felsinea S.p.A. Company and acquired Dilat S.p.A. in Soliera. The acquisitions during the 1990s involved the following companies: Latte San Giorgio of Locate di Triulzi (MI) in 1994, Interpack S.r.l. of Gualtieri (Reggio Emilia), Fiore S.r.l. of Udine, Sail S.p.A. of Bari (operating in Puglia under the 'Perla' brand) and Latte Cerulli of Teramo. In 1998 the cooperative that controlled the Granarolo Felsinea S.p.A. took the name Granlatte and the next year, Granarolo Felsinea changed its name to Granarolo S.p.A..

=== 2000–2010: the acquisition campaign continues ===
In 2000, Granarolo completed further acquisitions: Centrale del Latte of Milano, Vogliazzi Specialità Gastronomiche of Vercelli, Centrale del Latte of Viterbo "Alto Lazio", half the capital in Centrale del Latte di Calabria S.p.A. and Latte Bianchi in Mogliano Veneto (Treviso).

Also, in 2004 it acquired the Yomo Group to save it from bankruptcy, including the brands Yomo, Torre in Pietra (excluding milk), Mandriot, Pettinicchio and Merlo brands, and the factories in Pasturago (Yomo), Sermoneta (Pettinicchio) and Acqui Terme (Merlo). The former Yomo Group also included the CSL - Centro Sperimentale del Latte [Milk Experimentation Centre], tasked with producing probiotics for alimentary and pharmaceutical use (sold to the Sacco Group in 2013). During 2006 the historical Centrale del Latte plant in Milan closed, because it was not included in the acquisition. Its production was transferred to what was previously the Yomo plant in Pasturago.

In 2008, the Group was reorganised, which lead to the closure of the subsidiary Agriok S.p.A. (which operated in the supply chain traceability sector), and the gastronomic branch of the company (Vogliazzi) was sold off, as was the Sermoneta cheese factory (whereas the Pettinicchio brand was retained), and the plant in Acqui Terme (selling the Merlo brand).

In 2009, after eighteen years, Luciano Sita left the leadership of the company. He was replaced by Gianpiero Calzolari.

In 2010 the Group set up Zeroquattro S.r.l., an integrated logistics services company with a specific, though not exclusive, vocation for transporting and distributing fresh food products, via a refrigerated chain at 0 °C to 4 °C.

On the social commitment front, Granarolo was one of the promoters, along with CEFA Onlus, of the Africa Milk Project, an international self-development cooperation project, set up to create a milk sector in Njombe, one of the poorest districts of Tanzania.

=== 2011–2014: from internationalisation to the first billion ===
In 2011, Granarolo unveiled its strategic internationalisation plan, based on four main pillars: dimensional growth, and diversification of products, markets, and countries. In line with this foreign development, Granarolo Iberica S.L. was set up for distributing food products in Spain, and the Italian dairy company Lat Bri was acquired, the third largest fresh cheeses manufacturer in Italy, as well as Ferruccio Podda, a Sardinian Company with a 60-year history, which marked the addition of aged cheeses to the Group's range.

Granarolo International S.r.l. was set up and its first operation was in France with the acquisition of the French cheese group CIPF Codipal (now Granarolo France S.A.S.), that produces and distributes fresh and aged cheeses under the Casa Azzurra, Les Fromagers de Ste Colombe and Les Fromagers de St Omer brands, with two productive facilities.

Subsequent operations abroad saw the opening of Granarolo UK, a cheese exporting company in the United Kingdom, as well as of the first commercial branch in Shanghai, China. A partnership was also formed with the Vivartia Group, which includes the largest Greek manufacturer of dairy and cheese products, Delta Foods S.A., and that distributes Greek yoghurt and cheeses in Italy.

Meanwhile, in Italy a partnership was sealed with Amalattea S.p.A., which manufactures and markets goat's cheese and derivatives, and Pinzani dairy company was acquired, which specialises in making pecorino "a latte crudo" (made from raw milk).

CSR's activities gave rise to Allattami, The Donated Human Milk Bank of Bologna. This project collects mothers' milk in collaboration with the Sant'Orsola Hospital of Bologna. The 2014 financial year closed with turnover of more than a billion Euro.

=== 2015–2023: Expo and new acquisitions ===
At Expo Milano 2015, Granarolo represented the Italian milk supply chain as a partner of the Italian Pavilion. It recorded more than 510,000 visitors from more than 30 countries, and Africa Milk Project was chosen as the best of 800 projects worldwide, for Best Practice in the "Sustainable development of small rural communities in marginal areas" category.

Various acquisition operations are part of the product diversification strategy, aimed at enhancing the Group's presence on international markets: Gennari S.p.A., a company in Parma that specialises in making Parmigiano Reggiano and Prosciutto di Parma, the long-standing Pastificio Granarolo, that makes and markets egg and semolina pasta, and Conbio, an important Italian company that specialises in making vegetable and organic gastronomic products.

At the end of 2016, the Group announced the acquisition of 30% (increased in 2017 to 60%) of San Lucio S.r.l., a company that owns GrokSì!, a brand linked to an innovative baked cheese snack, obtained using a patented method.

Granarolo made numerous acquisitions in those years: a company in Chile, now named Granarolo Chile S.p.A., European Foods Ltd, the leading importer and distributor of Made in Italy products in New Zealand, Yema Distribuidora de Alimentos Ltda, a company that specialises in producing and marketing cheese products in Brazil, with two productive facilities, and Vinaio OÜ, renamed Granarolo Baltics OÜ, a company that operates in the cheese and dairy products marketing sector and in importing quality Italian products into Estonia. Then there was, Matric Italgross AB, a leading Swedish company that distributes Italian brands, Comarsa SA, a Made in Italy food distribution company in Switzerland, Allfood Importação, Indùstria e Comércio SA Brazil, the leading importer and distributor of European products in Brazil, and 50% of Quality Brands International Greece, a leading Greek distributor.

In 2017, Granarolo's sixtieth anniversary, the company recorded a turnover of 1.27 billion euro, representing an increase of 7.8%. EBITDA fell by 13% to 70.1 million, while profits also decreased from 22.6 million in 2016 to 10.1 million in 2017. In terms of percentage, revenues from exports grew from 17% to 20%, revenues from Italy fell from 77% to 72% while revenues from Extra EU countries rose from 6% to 8%.

In February 2018, the company acquired Midland Food Group, with central offices in London and two distribution centres in Basingstoke and Birmingham, with production facilities in the latter.

In April 2019 Granarolo acquired Venchiaredo, a stracchino cheese production company with 80 employees and turnover of almost € 27 million. This made Granarolo one of the largest Italian producers of stracchino.

In October 2021, Granarolo acquired 100% of Calabro Cheese Corp., a Connecticut-based US company that produces and markets dairy products such as ricotta, mozzarella and burrata, and Mario Costa, a producer of Gorgonzola PDO.

In May 2022, Granarolo acquired majority stake in White & Seeds, a wellness startup.

In July 2022, Granarolo acquired in the majority of Industria Latticini G. Cuomo, a historic company specialising in the production of mozzarella, ricotta and cow's milk cheeses.

On the subject of sustainability, in 2022, Standard Ethics Aei assigned a sustainability rating of 'E+' on a scale of F to EEE in the SE Food&Beverage Sustainability Italian Benchmark.

With CEFA Onlus takes shape in 2022 AfricHand Project, a milk supply chain project in Mozambique, in the Beira region. A production plant is inaugurated in September 2022.

In September 2023 Simona Caselli is appointed as the new President of Granlatte, Gianpiero Calzolari remains Chairman of Granarolo S.p.A.

In October 2023, the Board of Directors of Granarolo S.p.A. approved the 2024-2027 strategic plan with investments of over €300 million. The approval of the plan follows the €160 million capital increase defined at the end of March 2023, which saw the simultaneous entry of Patrimonio Rilancio - Fondo Nazionale Strategico (National Strategic Fund), managed by Cassa Depositi e Prestiti (CDP), and Ente Nazionale di Previdenza per gli addetti e gli impiegati in Agricoltura (ENPAIA) into the shareholding structure of Granarolo S.p.A.

=== 2024-present: new domestic and international investments ===
In March 2024, Granarolo signed an agreement with Maremma 1961 S.r.l. to take over the milk production and marketing branch of the Consorzio Produttori Latte Maremma, with a production plant in Grosseto, in Tuscany.

On the occasion of International Workers’ Day on May 1st, the President of the Italian Republic, Sergio Mattarella, and the Minister of Labor and Social Policies, Marina Elvira Calderone, visited the Granarolo plant in Castrovillari. During the same year, the company obtained the UNI/PdR 125:2022 gender equality certification, a goal set in the 2024-2028 Industrial Plan following the capital entry of Cassa Depositi e Prestiti and ENPAIA.

In the field of sustainability, the project for the protection of bees and pollinators – developed in collaboration with Conapi (National Beekeepers Consortium) – was honored with The European Bee Award 2024 in Brussels.

In May 2025, the Group inaugurated the “Caseificio Perla” in Gioia del Colle, specializing in the production of Apulian dairy products for both domestic and international markets. In October, Granarolo acquired a 100% stake in West Horsley Dairy, followed by the opening of its fifth outlet in Ferrara in November. In December, the Group finalized the sale of “Pastificio Granarolo” to the Camerino-based company Entroterra S.p.A.

In April 2026, a dairy facility was opened at the Rocco D’Amato Prison (known as Dozza) in Bologna, starting the production of caciotta cheese and a vocational training and employment program for inmates. The project is linked to the “Fare Impresa in Dozza” initiative and is designed to reduce recidivism rates. The milk is supplied through donations from the Granlatte dairy farmers’ cooperative. The employed inmates receive regular remuneration in accordance with the national collective agreement.

During the same month, following the conclusion of Gianpiero Calzolari’s 17-year tenure as Chairman of the Group, the Board of Directors appointed Stanislao Giuseppe Fabbrino as the new Chairman.

In May 2026, Granarolo sold the company Unconventional S.r.l.

== Company structure ==
Granarolo S.p.A. is controlled by Granlatte (63.14%); the other shareholders are Intesa Sanpaolo (14.95%), National Strategic Fund (15.27%), Enpaia (4.58%). The 2.06% are treasury shares.

Granlatte Consortium is a cooperative company, a member of Legacoop and Confcooperative. The cooperative includes 421 individual affiliated farmers and 3 collection cooperatives for a total of 488 milk producers. Granlatte operates in 11 regions of Italy: Emilia-Romagna, Piemonte, Lombardia, Veneto, Friuli-Venezia-Giulia, Lazio, Campania, Puglia, Basilicata, Molise and Calabria (updated at 31/12/2025).

The Italian companies of Granarolo S.p.A. are:

- Casearia Podda S.r.l. (100% by Granarolo S.p.A.): operates in Sardinia and abroad, producing pecorino, yoghurt, and fresh cheeses.
- Centrale del Fresco S.r.l. (100% by Granarolo S.p.A.): manages Granarolo outlets and shops.
- Zeroquattro Logistica S.r.l. (100% by Granarolo S.p.A.): a company that heads development and commercial management of the sales channels (Normal Trade and Ho.re.ca.) and divided distribution to points of sale.
- Valetti S.r.l. (100% by Granarolo S.p.A.): a distribution company to point of sale.
- San Lucio S.r.l. (60% by Granarolo S.p.A.): producer of cheese snacks.
- Venchiaredo S.p.A. (97% by Granarolo S.p.A.), a company specialized in the production of stracchino.
- Maremma 1961 S.r.l. (100% by Granarolo S.p.A.): company that manages the milk production and marketing branch of the Consorzio Produttori Latte Maremma.
- Amalattea S.r.l. (100% by Granarolo S.p.A.): one of Italy’s leading producers and distributors of goat’s milk and goat’s milk products.

The foreign companies of Granarolo S.p.A. are:

- Granarolo Benelux Sarl (100% by Granarolo S.p.A.)
- Granarolo France SAS (100% by Granarolo S.p.A.) → Granarolo Deutschland GmbH (100% by Granarolo France) → S.A.S. CIPF Codipal (100% by Granarolo France) → S.A.S. Les Fromagers de St Omer (100% by Granarolo France)
- Granarolo Baltics OÜ (100% by Granarolo S.p.A.)
- Granarolo Suisse SA (89% by Granarolo S.p.A.)
- Granarolo Nordic AB (100% by Granarolo S.p.A.)
- Granarolo Hellas SA (60% by Granarolo S.p.A.)
- Granarolo UK Ltd (100% by Granarolo S.p.A.) → Midland Chilled Food Ltd (100% by Granarolo UK Ltd)) → West Horsley Dairy Ltd (100% by Granarolo UK Ltd)
- Granarolo Polska sp. z o.o. (100% by Granarolo S.p.A.)
- Allfood Importação Indústria e Comércio SA Brazil (60% by Granarolo S.p.A. and 40% by Yema Distribuidora de Alimentos Ltda.)
- Yema Distribuidora de Alimentos Ltda. (100% by Granarolo S.p.A.)
- Granarolo Chile S.p.A. (100% by Granarolo S.p.A.)
- Granarolo New Zealand Ltd (100% by Granarolo S.p.A.)
- Granarolo USA (52% by Granarolo S.p.A.) → Calabro Cheese Corporation (100% by Granarolo USA)
- Granarolo Trading Shanghai Co.Ltd (100% by Granarolo S.p.A.)

== Factories ==
The Group operates via 21 production plants: 13 located throughout Italy, 2 in France, 3 in Brazil, 1 in Germany, 1 in USA and 1 in New Zealand.

Plants in Italy

Bologna

- ESL Milk
- Pasteurised cream
- Mozzarella

Pasturago di Vernate (MI)

- ESL milk
- UHT milk
- Yoghurt and desserts

Usmate Velate (MB)

- Mozzarella
- Mascarpone
- Ricotta
- Cheese snacks

Soliera (MO)

- UHT milk
- ESL Milk
- Vegetable drinks
- Parmigiano Reggiano PDO

Castelfranco Emilia (MO)

- Parmigiano Reggiano PDO

Casalino (NO)

- Gorgonzola PDO

Grosseto

- ESL milk

Aprilia (LT)

- Mozzarella

Gioia del Colle (BA)

- Mozzarella
- Burrata
- Stracciatella
- ESL milk
- UHT milk
- UHT cream

Castrovillari (CS)

- ESL milk
- UHT milk
- Caciocavallo Silano PDO
- Provola
- Ricotta

Sestu (CA)

- Pecorino Sardo PDO
- Pecorino Romano PDO
- Goat's milk cheese
- Ricotta
- Yoghurt

Montemiccioli (PI)

- Pecorino Toscano PDO
- Cheeses from sheep's milk
- Ricotta

Ramuscello (PN)

- Stracchino

Plants outside Italy

Campagne-lès-Wardrecques (FR)

Saint-Genix-sur-Guiers (FR)

Auckland (NZ)

Grünenbach (DE)

Andrelândia (BR)

São Paulo (BR)

Guareí (BR)

East Haven (US)
