= Diocese of Itumbiara =

Catholic ecclesiastical territory

Diocese of Itumbiara Dioecesis Itumbiarensis

Catholic
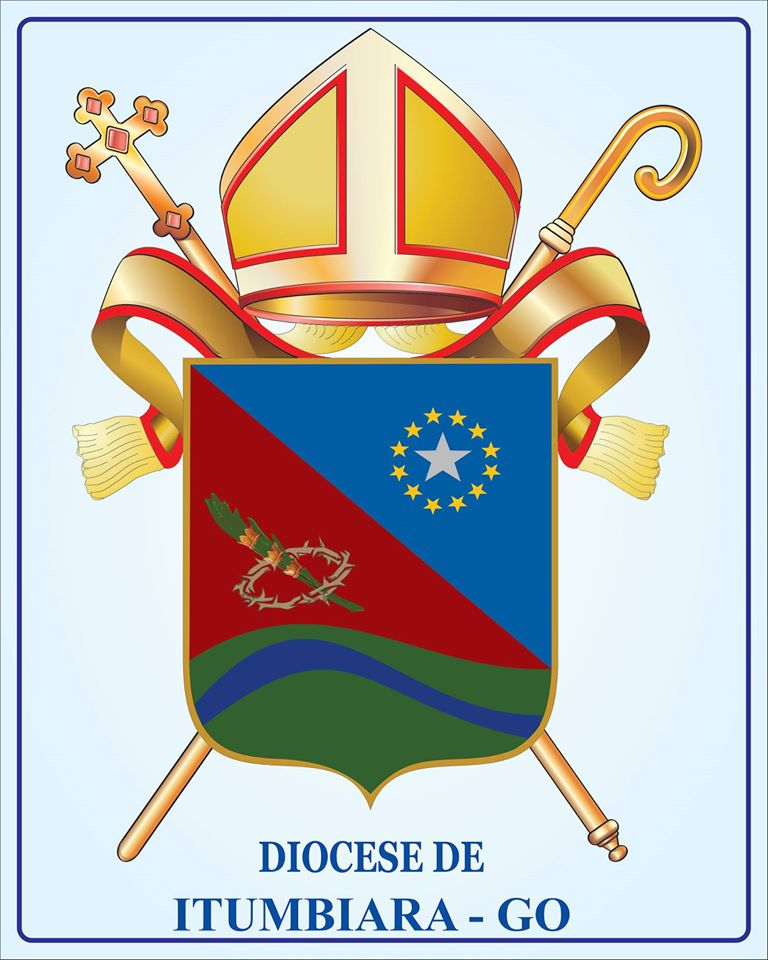
- Coat of arms

Location
- Country: Brazil
- Ecclesiastical province: Goiânia

Statistics
- Area: 21,871 km^{2} (8,444 sq mi)
- Population: Total; Catholics: (as of 2004); 283,383; 221,038 (78.0%)

Information
- Rite: Latin Rite
- Established: 11 October 1966 (60 years ago)
- Cathedral: Catedral Santa Rita de Cássia

Current leadership
- Pope: Leo XIV
- Bishop: José Aparecido Gonçalves de Almeida, C.S.S.

The Roman Catholic Diocese of Itumbiara (Latin: Itumbiaren(sis)) is a diocese located in the city of Itumbiara in the ecclesiastical province of Goiânia in Brazil.

== Statistics ==
According to the Pontifical Yearbook 2020 the diocese had at the end of 2019 a total of 234 170 baptized faithful.

== History ==
- October 11, 1966: Established as Diocese of Itumbiara from the Metropolitan Archdiocese of Goiânia.

== Leadership, in reverse chronological order ==
- Bishops of Itumbiara (Roman rite)
  - Bishop Antônio Fernando Brochini, C.S.S. (2014.10.15 - 2003. 06. 25)
  - Bishop Antônio Lino da Silva Dinis (1999.02.24 – 2013.12.01)
  - Bishop Celso Pereira de Almeida, O.P. (1995.01.25 – 1998.05.06)
  - Bishop José Carlos Castanho de Almeida (1987.09.05 – 1994.03.23), appointed Bishop of Araçatuba, São Paulo
  - Bishop José Belvino do Nascimento (1981.06.27 – 1987.02.06), appointed Coadjutor Bishop of Patos de Minas, Minas Gerais
  - Bishop José de Lima (1973.04.13 – 1981.06.07), appointed Bishop of Sete Lagoas, Minas Gerais
  - Bishop José Francisco Versiani Velloso (1966.10.27 – 1972.05.17)
