= José de Aquino Pereira =

Brazilian prelate

- Bishop of Diocese of São José do Rio Preto Emeritus
- Church: Roman Catholic Church
- See: Diocese of São José do Rio Preto
- In office: 1968–1997
- Predecessor: Lafayette Libânio
- Successor: Orani João Tempesta

Orders
- Ordination: December 3, 1944

Personal details
- Born: April 22, 1920 Andrães, Brazil
- Died: November 17, 2011 (aged 91)

José de Aquino Pereira (April 22, 1920 – November 17, 2011) was a Brazilian prelate of the Roman Catholic Church.

== Biography ==
Pereira was born in Brazil and ordained a priest on December 3, 1944, from the Diocese of São Carlos do Pinhal. Pereira was appointed Bishop of the Diocese of Dourados on January 23, 1958, and was ordained bishop on April 13, 1958. His next appointment would be to the Diocese of Presidente Prudente on March 26, 1960. Pereira's last appointment would be to the Diocese of São José do Rio Preto on May 6, 1968, where he served until his retirement on February 26, 1997.
