= Diocese of Araçatuba =

Catholic ecclesiastical territory

Coordinates: 21.2069°S 50.4386°W

Diocese of Araçatuba Dioecesis Arassatubensis Diocese de Araçatuba

Location
- Country: Brazil
- Ecclesiastical province: Botucatu
- Metropolitan: Botucatu

Statistics
- Area: 9,798 km^{2} (3,783 sq mi)
- Population: Total; Catholics: (as of 2012); 500,000; 424,550 (84.9%)

Information
- Rite: Latin Rite
- Established: 23 March 1994 (31 years ago)
- Cathedral: Cathedral of Our Lady of Aparecida in Araçatuba

Current leadership
- Pope: Leo XIV
- Bishop: Sérgio Krzywy
- Metropolitan Archbishop: Maurício Grotto de Camargo

Website
- Website of the Diocese

The Roman Catholic Diocese of Araçatuba (Latin: Dioecesis Arassatubensis) is a diocese located in the city of Araçatuba in the ecclesiastical province of Botucatu in Brazil.

== History ==
- March 23, 1994: Established as Diocese of Araçatuba from the Diocese of Lins

== Bishops ==
- Bishops of Araçatuba (Latin Rite)
  - José Carlos Castanho de Almeida (1994.03.23 – 2003.09.17)
  - Maurício Grotto de Camargo (Apostolic Administrator 2003.09.17 – 2004.05.24)
  - Sérgio Krzywy (2004.05.26 – ...)

=== Other priest of this diocese who became bishop ===
- Arnaldo Carvalheiro Neto, appointed Coadjutor Bishop of Itapeva, São Paulo

== Sources ==
- GCatholic.org
- Catholic Hierarchy
