= Abraham Castanho =

Spanish poet

Abraham Castanho was a Spanish Jewish poet who lived at Amsterdam in the middle of the 17th century. He was the author of an elegy on the martyr Abraham Nuñez Bernal, who was burned at Córdoba May 3, 1655. It was inserted in Elogios que Zelosos Dedicaron á la Felice Memoria, etc., published probably at Amsterdam in 1656.

== Bibliography ==
- Wolf, Johann Christoph, Bibliotheca Hebræa iii, Nos. cxlix. et seq.
- Kayserling, Meyer, Sephardim, p. 262
- —, Biblioteca Española-Portugueza-Judaica, p. 35
- Fürst, Julius, Bibliotheca Judaica i, 148.G. I. Br.
