= David Picão =

Brazilian bishop of the Roman Catholic Diocese of Santos

- Bishop of Santos
- Church: Catholic Church
- Diocese: Diocese of Santos
- In office: 21 November 1966 – 26 July 2000
- Predecessor: Idílio José Soares
- Successor: Jacyr Francisco Braido
- Previous posts: Titular Bishop of Thois (1963-1966); Coadjutor Bishop of Santos (1963-1966); Bishop of São João da Boa Vista (1960-1963)

Orders
- Ordination: 10 October 1948
- Consecration: 31 July 1960 by Armando Lombardi

Personal details
- Born: 18 August 1923 Ribeirão Preto, São Paulo, Republic of the United States of Brazil
- Died: 30 April 2009 (aged 85) Santos, São Paulo, Brazil

David Picão (18 August 1923 in Ribeirão Preto – 30 April 2009 in Santos) was the Brazilian bishop of the Roman Catholic Diocese of Santos from 21 November 1996, until his retirement on 26 July 2000. The diocese is headquartered in Santos, São Paulo. He was succeeded by Jacyr Francisco Braido.

Picão died on 30 April 2009 in Santos at the age of 85.
