= José Carlos Castanho de Almeida =

Brazilian priest (1930–2022)

- Bishop of Araçatuba
- Church: Catholic Church
- Diocese: Diocese of Araçatuba
- In office: 23 March 1994 – 17 September 2003
- Predecessor: Diocese erected
- Successor: Sérgio Krzywy
- Previous posts: Bishop of Itumbiara (1987-1994); Titular Bishop of Urusi (1982-1987); Auxiliary Bishop of Santos (1982-1987)

Orders
- Ordination: 8 December 1953
- Consecration: 2 May 1982 by Paulo Evaristo Arns

Personal details
- Born: 14 June 1930 Guareí, São Paulo, Republic of the United States of Brazil
- Died: 27 February 2022 (aged 91) Sorocaba, São Paulo, Brazil

José Carlos Castanho de Almeida (14 June 1930 – 27 February 2022) was a Brazilian Roman Catholic prelate.

Castanho de Almeida was born in Guareí, Brazil, and was ordained to the priesthood in 1953. He served as titular bishop of 'Urusi' and as auxiliary bishop of the Roman Catholic Diocese of Santos, Brazil, from 1982 to 1987. He then served as bishop of the Roman Catholic Diocese of Itumbiara, Brazil, from 1987 to 1994 and as bishop of the Roman Catholic Diocese of Araçatuba, Brazil, from 1994 until his resignation in 2003. Castanho de Almeida died in Sorocaba on 27 February 2022, at the age of 91.
