= Diocese of Jales =

Catholic ecclesiastical territory

Coordinates: 20.2688°S 50.5482°W

Diocese of Jales Dioecesis Ialespolitanus

Catholic

Location
- Country: Brazil
- Ecclesiastical province: São José do Rio Preto

Statistics
- Area: 12,788 km^{2} (4,937 sq mi)
- Population: Total; Catholics: (as of 2004); 359,702; 291,000 (80.9%)

Information
- Rite: Latin Rite
- Established: 12 December 1959 (66 years ago)
- Cathedral: Catedral Nossa Senhora da Assunção

Current leadership
- Pope: Leo XIV
- Bishop: José Reginaldo Andrietta
- Metropolitan Archbishop: Antônio Emídio Vilar, S.D.B.
- Bishops emeritus: Luiz Demétrio Valentini

Website
- www.diocesedejales.org.br

The Roman Catholic Diocese of Jales (Latin: Dioecesis Ialespolitanus) is a diocese located in the city of Jales in the ecclesiastical province of São José do Rio Preto in Brazil.

== History ==
- 12 December 1959: Established as Diocese of Jales from the Diocese of Rio Preto.

== Leadership ==
- Bishops of Jales (Roman rite), in reverse chronological order
  - Bishop José Reginaldo Andrietta (2015.10.21 - present)
  - Bishop Luiz Demétrio Valentini (1982.06.08 – 2015.10.21)
  - Bishop Luíz Eugênio Pérez (1970.03.09 – 1981.06.07)
  - Bishop Arturo Gerrit João Hermanus Maria Horsthuis, A.A. (1960.02.13 – 1968.11.07)
