= Caconde =

Municipality in the state of São Paulo, Brazil

- Municipality
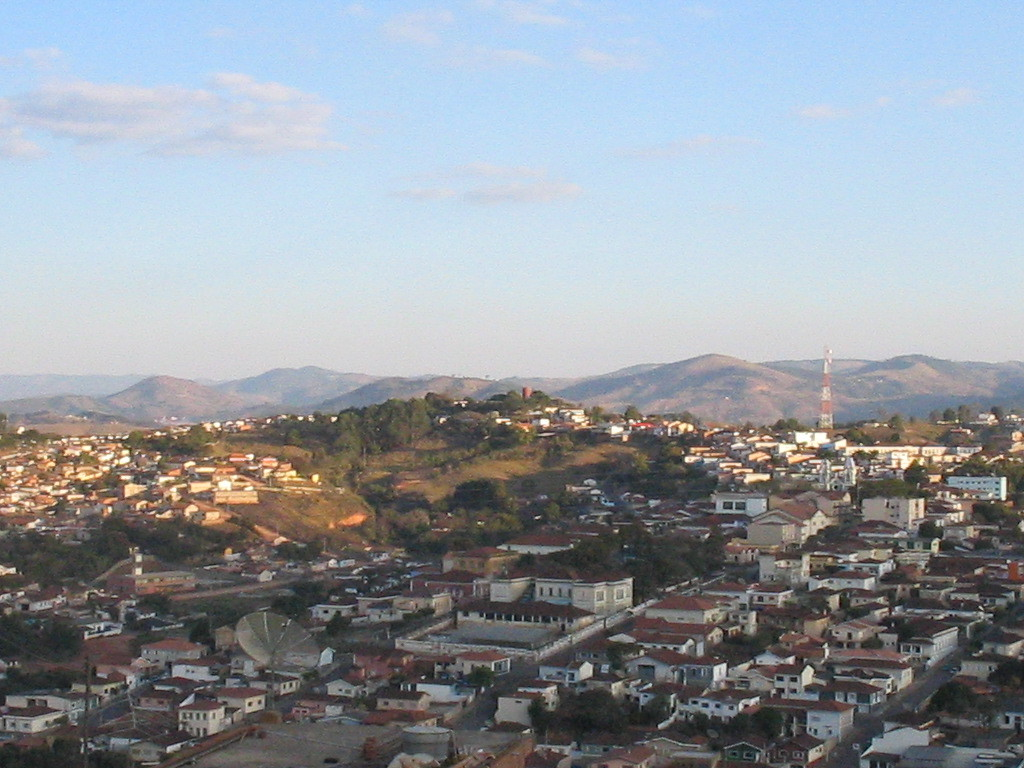

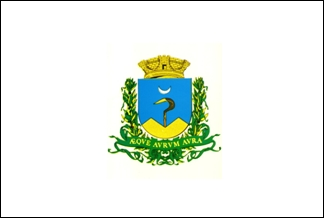
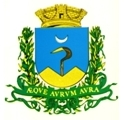
- Flag Coat of arms

- Location in São Paulo state

- Location in Brazil
- Coordinates: 21°31′44″S 46°38′38″W
- Country: Brazil
- Region: Southeast
- State: São Paulo

Area
  - Total: 468 km^{2} (181 sq mi)
- Elevation: 860 m (2,820 ft)

Population (2020)
  - Total: 19,009
  - Density: 40.6/km^{2} (105/sq mi)
- Time zone: UTC−3 (BRT)
- Postal code: 13770-000

Caconde is a municipality in the state of São Paulo in Brazil. The population is 19,009 (2020 est.) in an area of 468 km^{2} (181 sq mi).

== Demographics ==
Historical population (municipality)
Year	Population	%±
1920	24,791
1940	17,314	−30.2%
1950	15,834	−8.5%
1960	18,158	14.7%
1970	15,248	−16.0%
1980	16,418	7.7%
1991	17,283	5.3%
2000	18,378	6.3%
2010	18,538	0.9%
2022	17,101	−7.8%

== Media ==
In telecommunications, the city was served by Telecomunicações de São Paulo. In July 1998, this company was acquired by Telefónica, which adopted the Vivo brand in 2012. The company is currently an operator of cell phones, fixed lines, internet (fiber optics/4G) and television (satellite and cable).

== See also ==
- List of municipalities in São Paulo
