= Archdiocese of São José do Rio Preto =

Catholic ecclesiastical territory

Archdiocese of São José do Rio Preto Archidioecesis Riopretensis

Catholic
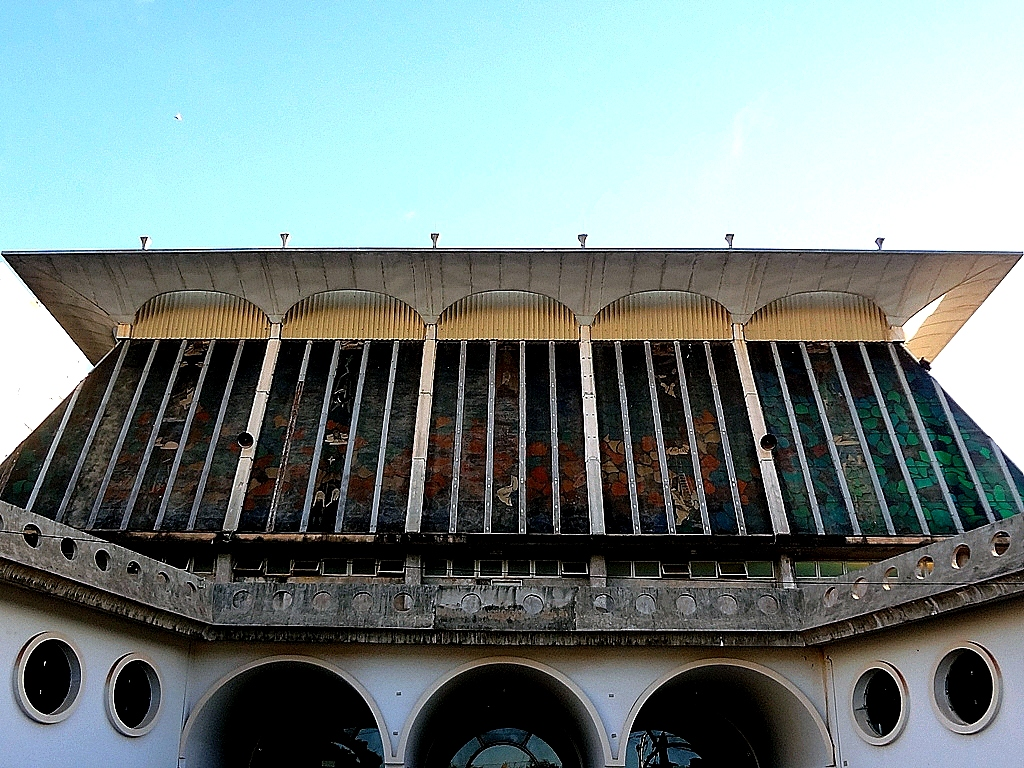

Location
- Country: Brazil

Statistics
- Area: 7,784 km^{2} (3,005 sq mi)
- Population: Total; Catholics: 934,000; 701,000 (75.05%)

Information
- Rite: Roman Rite
- Established: 25 January 1929 (97 years ago)
- Cathedral: Catedral São José

Current leadership
- Pope: Leo XIV
- Metropolitan Archbishop: Antônio Emídio Vilar, S.D.B.
- Bishops emeritus: Tomé Ferreira da Silva

Map
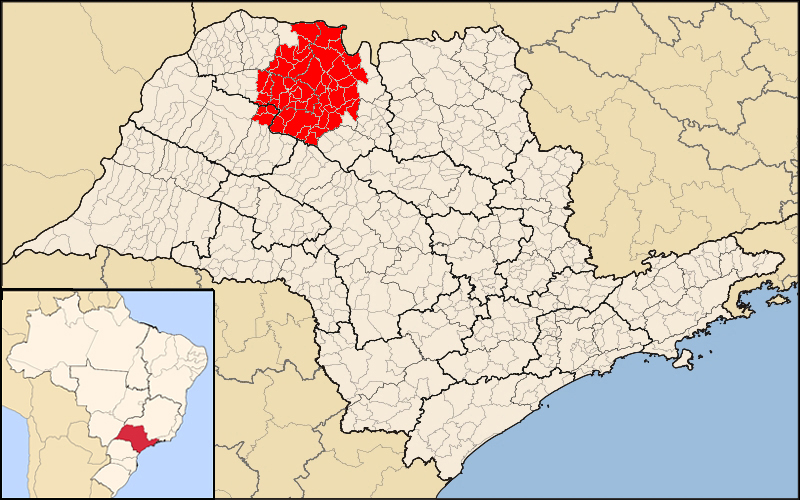

Website
- www.bispado.org.br

The Roman Catholic Archdiocese of São José do Rio Preto (Latin: Archidioecesis Riopretensis) is an archdiocese located in the city of São José do Rio Preto in Brazil.

== History ==
- 25 January 1929: Established as Diocese of Rio Preto from the Diocese of São Carlos do Pinhal
- 12 December 1959: Lost territory to the erection of the Diocese of Jales
- 14 April 1973: Lost territory to the erection of the Diocese of Barretos
- 9 February 2000: Lost territory to the erection of the Diocese of Catanduva
- 11 December 2002: Renamed as Diocese of São José do Rio Preto
- 20 July 2016: Lost territory to the erection of the Diocese of Votuporanga
- 22 May 2025: Elevated to the rank of a metropolitan archdiocese; the ecclesiastical province of São José do Rio Preto was erected by Pope Leo XIV.

== Special churches ==
- Minor Basilicas:
  - Basílica Nossa Senhora Aparecida, Rio Preto

== Suffragan dioceses ==
- Diocese of Barretos
- Diocese of Catanduva
- Diocese of Jales
- Diocese of Votuporanga

== Bishops ==
=== Ordinaries, in reverse chronological order ===
- Bishops of São José do Rio Preto (Roman rite), below
  - Bishop Antônio Emídio Vilar, S.D.B. (19 January 2022 – present)
  - Bishop Tomé Ferreira da Silva (16 November 2012 – 18 August 2021)
  - Bishop Paulo Mendes Peixoto (25 February 2006 – 7 March 2012); elevated to Archbishop of Uberaba
  - Bishop Orani João Tempesta, O. Cist. (25 April 1997 – 8 December 2004); elevated to Archbishop of Belem do Para, then Archbishop of Sao Sebastio Rio de Janeiro; future Cardinal
- Bishops of Rio Preto (Roman Rite), below
  - Bishop José de Aquino Pereira (4 August 1968 – 26 February 1997)
  - Bishop Lafayette Libânio (27 December 1930 – 3 November 1966)

=== Auxiliary bishop ===
- José Joaquim Gonçalves (1957-1973), appointed Bishop of Cornélio Procópio, Parana

=== Other priest of this diocese who became bishop ===
- David Dias Pimentel, appointed Auxiliary Bishop of Belo Horizonte, Minas Gerais in 1996
