= Diocese of Jaboticabal =

Catholic ecclesiastical territory

Diocese of Jaboticabal Dioecesis Iaboticaballensis

Catholic
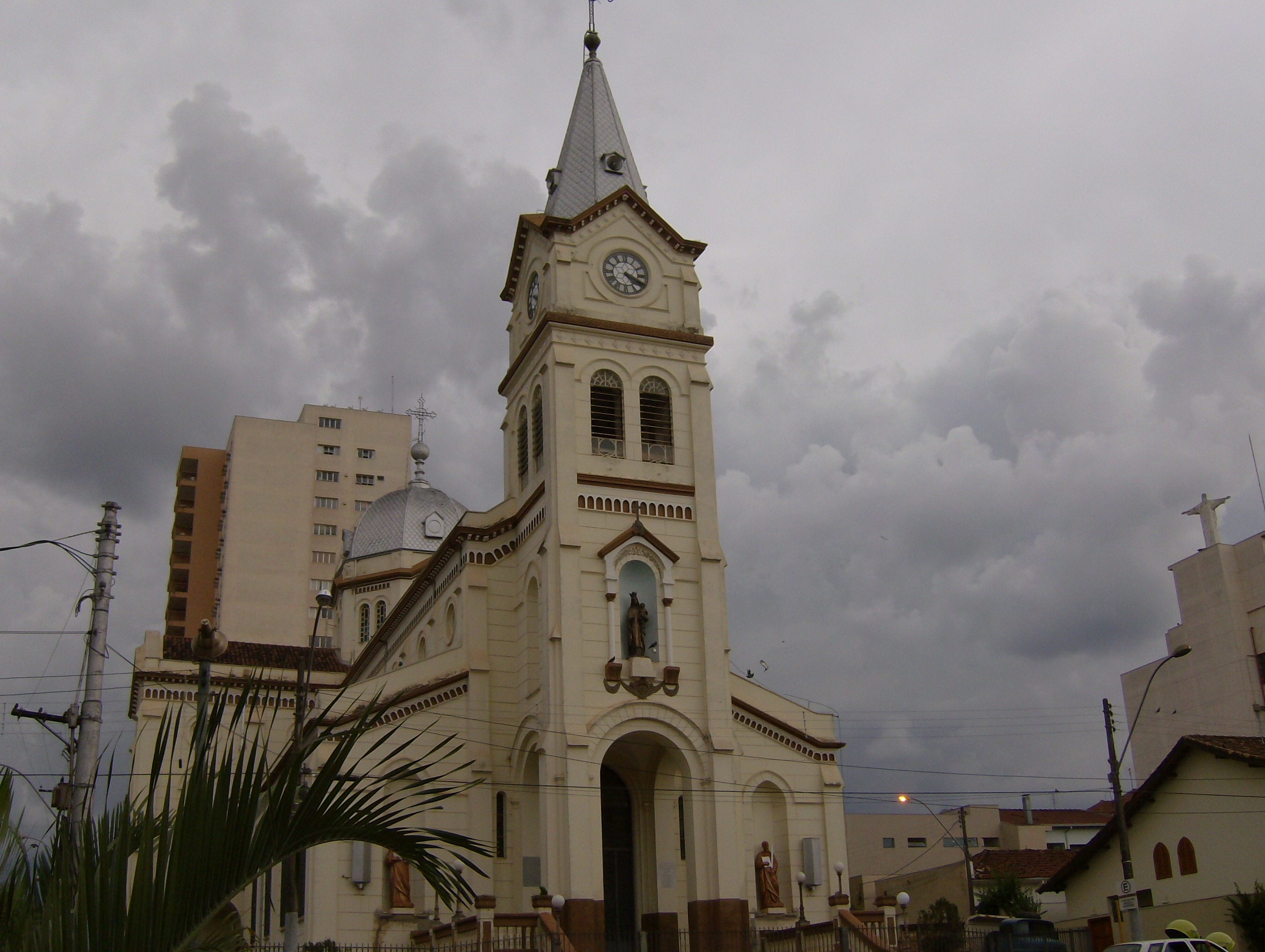
- Catedral Nossa Senhora do Carmo in 2008

Location
- Country: Brazil
- Ecclesiastical province: Ribeirão Preto

Statistics
- Area: 5,175 km^{2} (1,998 sq mi)
- Population: Total; Catholics: (as of 2006); 446,000; 327,000 (73.3%)

Information
- Rite: Latin Rite
- Established: 25 January 1929 (97 years ago)
- Cathedral: Catedral Nossa Senhora do Carmo

Current leadership
- Pope: Leo XIV
- Bishop: Eduardo Pinheiro da Silva, S.D.B.
- Metropolitan Archbishop: Moacir Silva

Website
- www.diocesejaboticabal.org.br

The Roman Catholic Diocese of Jaboticabal (Latin: Dioecesis Iaboticaballensis) is a diocese located in the city of Jaboticabal in the ecclesiastical province of Ribeirão Preto in Brazil.

== History ==
- 25 January 1929: Established as Diocese of Jaboticabal from the Diocese of São Carlos do Pinhal

== Bishops ==
- Bishops of Jaboticabal (Roman rite), in reverse chronological order
  - Bishop Eduardo Pinheiro da Silva, S.D.B. (2015.04.22 - ...)
  - Bishop Antônio Fernando Brochini, C.S.S. (2003.06.25 – 2014.10.05), appointed;Bishop of Itumbiara, Goias
  - Bishop Luíz Eugênio Pérez (1981.06.07 – 2003.06.25)
  - Bishop José Varani (1961.02.07 – 1981.06.07)
  - Archbishop (personal title) Antônio Augusto de Assis (1931.07.31 – 1961.02.07)

=== Coadjutor bishops ===
- José Varani (1950-1961)
- Fernando Antônio Brochini, C.S.S. (2001-2003)

=== Auxiliary bishop ===
- Gabriel Paulino Bueno Couto, O. Carm. (1946-1954), appointed Auxiliary Bishop of Curitiba, Parana

=== Other priests of this diocese who became bishops ===
- José de Lanza Neto, appointed Auxiliary Bishop of Londrina, Parana in 2004
- Milton Kenan Júnior, appointed Auxiliary Bishop of São Paulo in 2009
- Wilson Luís Angotti Filho, appointed Auxiliary Bishop of Belo Horizonte, Minas Gerais in 2011
