= Pedro Fré =

Brazilian Roman Catholic bishop

Pedro Fré CSsR (August 30, 1924 – April 3, 2014) was a Catholic bishop.

Ordained to the priesthood in 1950, Fré was named bishop of the Diocese of Corumbá, Brazil, in 1985. In 1989, he was appointed Bishop of the Diocese of Barretos and retired in 2000.
