= Anhumas =

- Municipality
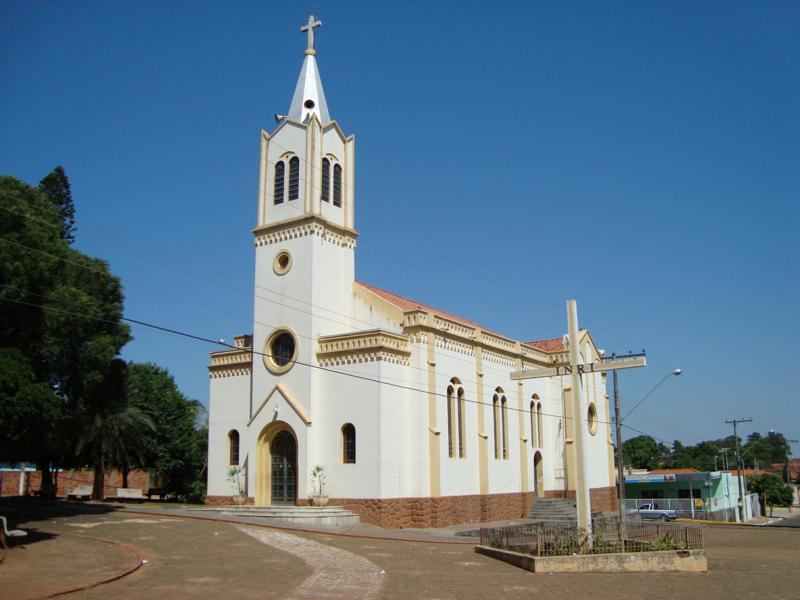
- The Church of Santa Luzia in Anhumas

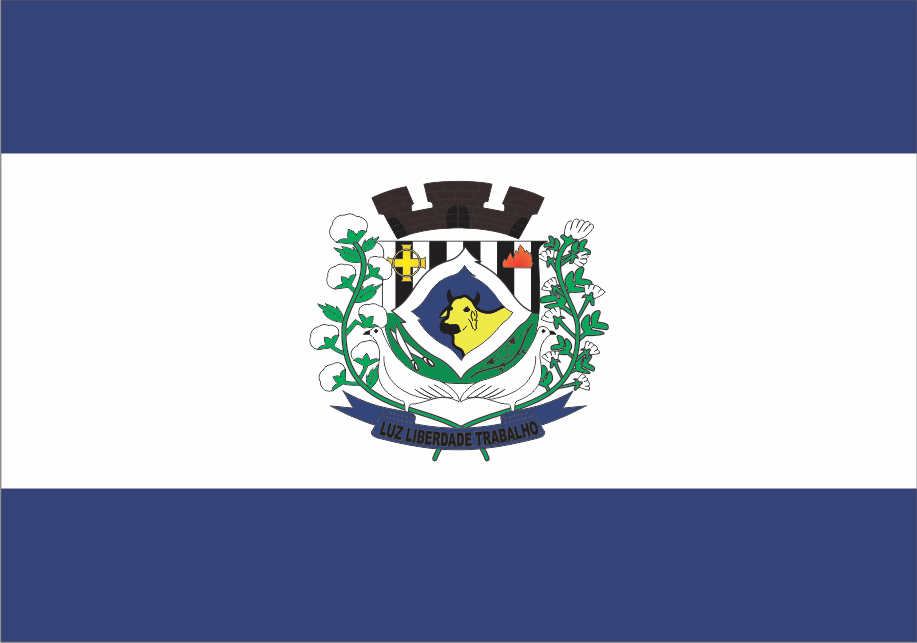
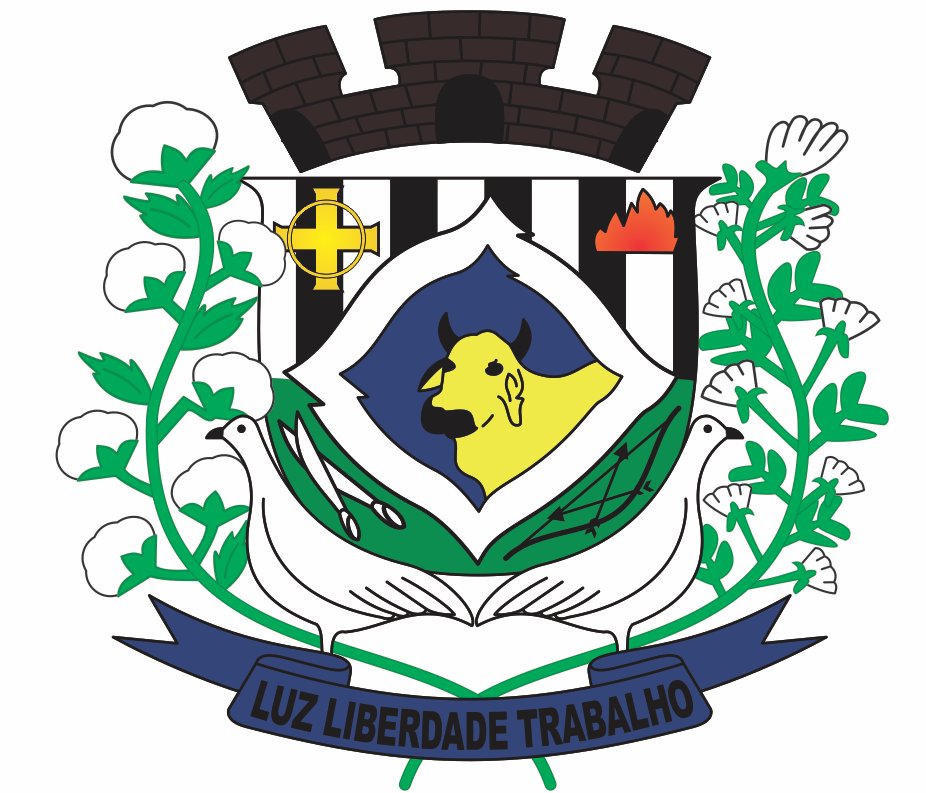
- Flag Coat of arms

- Location in São Paulo state

- Location in Brazil
- Coordinates: 22°17′44″S 51°23′15″W
- Country: Brazil
- Region: Southeast
- State: São Paulo

Area
  - Total: 321 km^{2} (124 sq mi)

Population (2020)
  - Total: 4,144
  - Density: 12.9/km^{2} (33.4/sq mi)
- Time zone: UTC−3 (BRT)

Anhumas is a Brazilian municipality in the southern region of the state of São Paulo. Situated at 422 m above sea level, Anhumas is 500 km from the city of São Paulo. The population is 4,144 (2020 est.) in an area of 321 km^{2} (124 sq mi).

== History ==
The beginnings of the town can be traced back to 1875 when the Sorocabana Railroad opened up the region bounded by the Anhumas, Paranapanema, Peixe, and Aguapeí rivers. Initially, it was only a tiny village serving two farms which between them covered 30,000 acres. With the influx of immigrants, Anhumas had grown to 120 households by 1928 with 500 farmers working the surrounding land which was planted with 4,000,000 coffee trees. At that time, the town was under the governance of the municipality of Presidente Prudente.

Until 1938, when the first wooden house was built, all the town's buildings were made from mudbricks, including its first chapel, which was built in 1921 and serviced by visiting priests. The town received its own parish and resident priest in 1936. The cornerstone for the parish church, dedicated to Santa Luzia, was laid in 1941. The church was completed in 1953, the same year in which Anhumas was granted status as an independent municipality.

== Demographics ==
Historical population (municipality)
Year	Population	%±
1960	6,668	—
1970	5,609	−15.9%
1980	3,421	−39.0%
1991	3,242	−5.2%
2000	3,411	5.2%
2010	3,738	9.6%
2022	4,023	7.6%

The population of Anhumas had reached its height in 1950 when the town had 8,843 inhabitants. However its population fell over the ensuing years. By 1960 the population was 6,668; by 1980 it was 3,242.

== Geography ==
Anhumas lies in the Mata Atlântica, a biome with a subtropical climate and characterised by moist broadleaf forests. Its economy remains largely agriculture-based.

== Media ==
In telecommunications, the city was served by Telecomunicações de São Paulo. In July 1998, this company was acquired by Telefónica, which adopted the Vivo brand in 2012.

The company is currently an operator of cell phones, fixed lines, internet (fiber optics/4G) and television (satellite and cable).

== Religion ==
Christianity is present in the city as follows:

=== Catholic Church ===
The Catholic church in the municipality is part of the Roman Catholic Diocese of Presidente Prudente.

=== Protestant Church ===
The most diverse evangelical beliefs are present in the city, mainly Pentecostal, including the Assemblies of God in Brazil (the largest evangelical church in the country), Christian Congregation in Brazil, among others. These denominations are growing more and more throughout Brazil.

== See also ==
- List of municipalities in São Paulo
