= Rodovia Assis Chateaubriand =

Highway in Saõ Paulo, Brazil

SP-425
- Rodovia Assis Chateaubriand
- Map of the itinerary of Assis Chateubriand Highway (in red)

Route information
- Maintained by the Department of Roads of the State of São Paulo (DER)
- Length: 499 km (310 mi)

Major junctions
- East end: Miguelópolis, SP
- Rodovia Transbrasiliana; Rodovia Marechal Cândido Rondon
- West end: Pirapozinho, SP

Location
- Country: Brazil
- State: São Paulo

Highway system
- Highways in Brazil; Federal; São Paulo State Highways

Rodovia Assis Chateubriand (officially designated SP-425) is a highway in the state of São Paulo, Brazil. Its name honours the Brazilian journalist and press tycoon Assis Chateaubriand.

The highway, which is single-lane in most of its length, crosses the state in the northeast–southwest direction. It starts in the city of Guaíra, and passes through Barretos, Olímpia and São José do Rio Preto, where it interconnects with the Rodovia Transbrasiliana (BR-153). The route continues to Presidente Prudente, passing through Penápolis and Martinópolis.

It is managed and maintained by the Department of Roads of the State of São Paulo (DER). It has two toll stations, one near Indiana and the other near Martinópolis.

== See also ==
- Highway system of São Paulo
- Brazilian Highway System
