= Pablo (footballer, born 1987) =

Brazilian footballer

Personal information
- Full name: Pablo Freitas Cardoso Mello
- Date of birth: May 5, 1987 (age 39)
- Place of birth: Presidente Prudente, Brazil
- Height: 1.70 m (5 ft 7 in)
- Position: Striker

Youth career
- 1998–2000: São Paulo
- 2000–2002: Portuguesa
- 2002–2008: São Paulo

Senior career*
Years	Team	Apps	(Gls)
2008	→ Metropolitano (Loan)	0	(0)
2008–2009	São Paulo	1	(0)
2009	→ Toledo (Loan)	0	(0)
2010	São Bento		
2010	Oeste		
2011	São Bento		
2011	Juventus		
2012	CRB		
2012	Luverdense		
- * Club domestic league appearances and goals as of January 11, 2009

Pablo Freitas Cardoso Mello or simply Pablo (born May 5, 1987 in Presidente Prudente), is a Brazilian striker. He currently plays for Luverdense.

== Titles ==
São Paulo

- Brazilian League: 1

2008

== See also ==
- Football in Brazil
- List of football clubs in Brazil
