= Alfredo Marcondes =

Municipality in Brazil

- Municipality
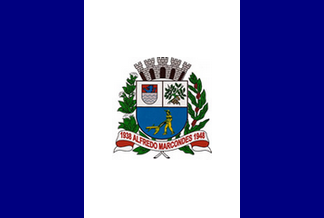
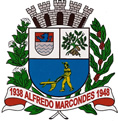
- Flag Coat of arms

- Location in São Paulo state

- Location in Brazil
- Coordinates: 21°57′19″S 51°24′48″W
- Country: Brazil
- Region: Southeast
- State: São Paulo

Area
  - Total: 119 km^{2} (46 sq mi)

Population (2020)
  - Total: 4,184
  - Density: 35.2/km^{2} (91.1/sq mi)
- Time zone: UTC−3 (BRT)

Alfredo Marcondes is a Brazilian municipality located in the state of São Paulo. The population is 4,184 (2020 est.) in an area of 119 km^{2} (46 sq mi).

== History ==
The municipality was created by state law in 1948.

Map of the state of São Paulo (1948).

== Demographics ==
Historical population (municipality)
Year	Population	%±
1950	16,054	—
1960	7,679	−52.2%
1970	6,867	−10.6%
1980	4,309	−37.3%
1991	3,493	−18.9%
2000	3,697	5.8%
2010	3,891	5.2%
2022	4,445	14.2%

== Media ==
In telecommunications, the city was served by Telecomunicações de São Paulo. In July 1998, this company was acquired by Telefónica, which adopted the Vivo brand in 2012.

The company is currently an operator of cell phones, fixed lines, internet (fiber optics/4G) and television (satellite and cable).

== Religion ==
Christianity is present in the city as follows:

=== Catholic Church ===
The Catholic church in the municipality is part of the Roman Catholic Diocese of Presidente Prudente.

=== Protestant Church ===
The most diverse evangelical beliefs are present in the city, mainly Pentecostal, including the Assemblies of God in Brazil (the largest evangelical church in the country), Christian Congregation in Brazil, among others. These denominations are growing more and more throughout Brazil.

== See also ==
- List of municipalities in the state of São Paulo by population
- Interior of São Paulo
