= Rio do Peixe (Paraná River tributary) =

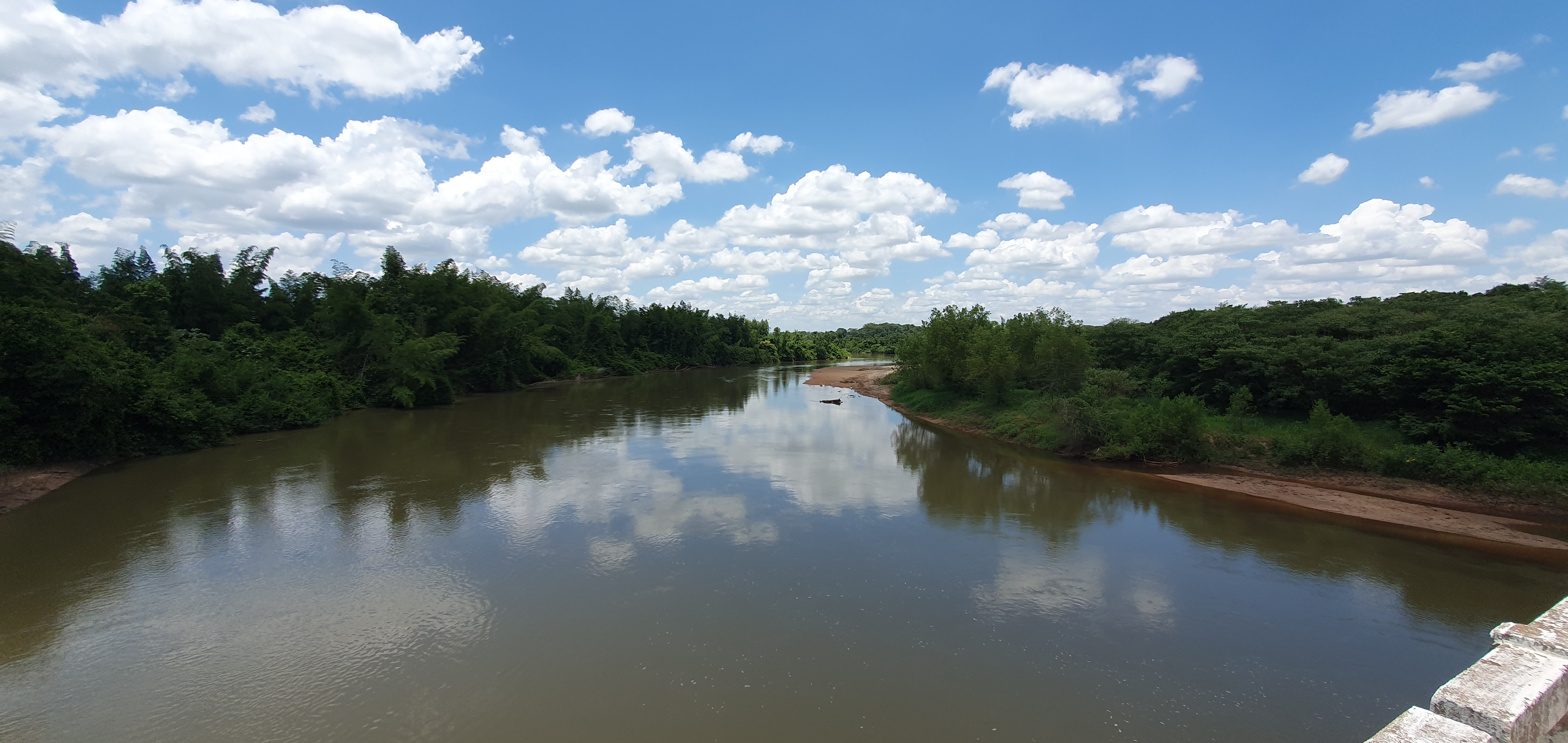

- Location within Brazil

Location
- Country: Brazil

Physical characteristics
- Source
  - location: São Paulo state
- Mouth
  - coordinates: 21.568°S 51.916°W

Basin features
- River system: Paraná River

The Rio do Peixe is a river of São Paulo state in southeastern Brazil. It is a left tributary of the Paraná River.

The 7,720 hectares (19,100 acres) Rio do Peixe State Park, created in 2002, protects the margins of the Rio do Peixe in a region near its mouth where it meanders through várzea interspersed with permanent or temporary lagoons. Due to its similarity with the Pantanal, this section of the Rio do Peixe is sometimes called the "São Paulo Pantanal". The park is known for its marsh deer (Blastocerus dichotomus), the largest deer in South America at up to 2 metres (6 ft 7 in) in length, which is found in marshes with high vegetation from southern Peru and Brazil to Uruguay.

== See also ==
- List of rivers of São Paulo
