= Eugênio Sales =

Cardinal of the Roman Catholic Church (1920–2012)

His Eminence Eugênio Sales
- Cardinal, Archbishop Emeritus of Rio de Janeiro
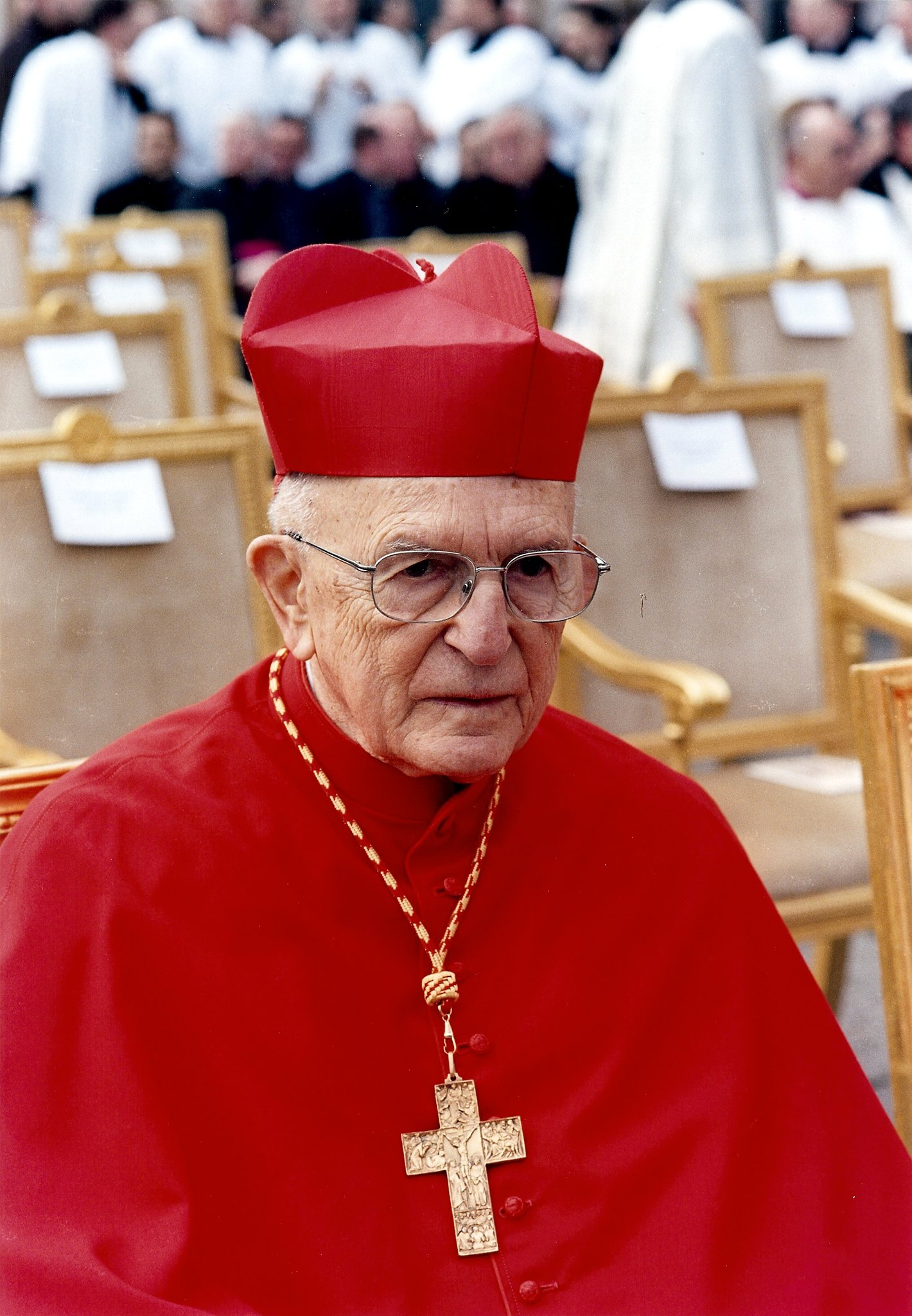
- Church: Roman Catholic Church
- Archdiocese: São Sebastião do Rio de Janeiro
- See: São Sebastião do Rio de Janeiro
- Appointed: 13 March 1971
- Term ended: 25 July 2001
- Predecessor: Jaime de Barros Câmara
- Successor: Eusébio Scheid
- Other posts: Cardinal-Priest of San Gregorio VII (1969–2012); Cardinal Protopriest (2009–2012)
- Previous posts: Titular Bishop of Thibica (1954-68); Auxiliary Bishop of Natal (1954-68); Apostolic Administrator sede plena of Natal (1961-65); Apostolic Administrator sede plena of São Salvador da Bahia (1964-68); Archbishop of São Salvador da Bahia (1968–71); Ordinary of Brazil of the Eastern Rite (1972-2001)

Orders
- Ordination: 21 November 1943 by Marcolino Esmeraldo de Souza Dantas
- Consecration: 15 August 1954 by José de Medeiros Delgado
- Created cardinal: 28 April 1969 by Pope Paul VI
- Rank: Cardinal-priest

Personal details
- Born: Eugênio de Araújo Sales; 8 November 1920 Acari, Rio Grande do Norte Brazil
- Died: 9 July 2012 (aged 91) Rio de Janeiro, Brazil
- Buried: Rio de Janeiro Cathedral
- Parents: Celso Dantas Sales; Josefa de Araujo Sales
- Motto: Impendam et superimpendar
- Coat of arms

Eugênio de Araújo Sales (8 November 1920 – 9 July 2012) was a cardinal in the Roman Catholic Church, having been elevated by Pope Paul VI on 28 April 1969. He served as archbishop of São Sebastião do Rio de Janeiro for thirty years until his resignation was accepted in 2001, when he had already passed the maximum age for voting in a papal conclave. He was the Cardinal Protopriest of the Holy Roman Church and also the longest-serving living Cardinal of the Catholic Church from 16 February 2009 until his death.

== Early life and ordination ==
Sales was born in Acari, Rio Grande do Norte, Brazil to a prominent upper-class family: his father, Celso Dantas Sales, was a judge in the Court of Appeals of the State of Rio Grande do Norte. Eugênio Sales did humanistic studies as a teenager and entered the minor seminary at Natal in 1936. After spending one year in the minor seminary, Sales graduated to the major seminary at Fortaleza, where he prepared to the priesthood from 1937 to 1943.

He was ordained to the priesthood on 21 November 1943, and spent the following decade in pastoral work in the Archdiocese of Natal.

== Bishop ==
Pope Pius XII appointed Sales to the episcopate, naming him titular bishop of Thibica and auxiliary bishop of Natal on 1 June 1954. Sales was consecrated a bishop on 15 August 1954.

On 9 January 1962, Pope John XXIII named Sales Apostolic Administrator of Natal, and on 9 July 1964 Pope Paul VI transferred him to the Primatial See of São Salvador da Bahia also as apostolic administrator sede plena.

Bishop Sales attended all the sessions of the Second Vatican Council between 1962 and 1965.

On 29 October 1968, Sales, until then apostolic administrator, was appointed Metropolitan Archbishop of São Salvador da Bahia, becoming ex officio the Primate of Brazil.

== Cardinal ==
Styles of Eugênio de Araújo Sales
- Reference style: His Eminence
- Spoken style: Your Eminence
- Informal style: Cardinal
- See: São Sebastião do Rio de Janeiro (emeritus)

On the consistory of 28 April 1969, Pope Paul created Archbishop Sales a Cardinal of the Holy Roman Church. On 30 April 1969 Cardinal Sales received his red biretta and the title of Cardinal-Priest of S. Gregorio VII.

Sales, then Metropolitan Archbishop of Salvador and Primate of Brazil was appointed papal legate to the Brazilian National Eucharistic Congress held in 1970 and in that capacity he presided over the aforementioned gathering, which took place in Brasília, the Nation's capital.

On 13 March 1971, Pope Paul VI transferred Sales to the Metropolitan Archdiocese of São Sebastião do Rio de Janeiro. Sales took possession of his new See on 27 March 1971. In 1972 Sales received the additional responsibility of Ordinary to the Faithful of Oriental Rite in Brazil without their own Ordinary.

As a Cardinal-elector, Sales participated in the August and October 1978 conclaves.

Sales led the Metropolitan Archdiocese of Saint Sebastian of Rio de Janeiro for thirty years, between 1971 and 2001.

In the Roman Curia, Sales was appointed a member of the Council of Cardinals for the Study of the Organizational and Economic Problems of Holy See in 1981.

While serving as Archbishop of Rio de Janeiro, Sales attended the II Ordinary Assembly of the Synod of Bishops in 1971, the III General Conference of the Latin American Episcopate in 1979, the Extraordinary Consistory (plenary meeting of the College of Cardinals) also in 1979, the V Ordinary Assembly of the Synod of Bishops, the Extraordinary Consistory of 1982, the VI Ordinary Assembly of the Synod of Bishops, in 1983, the Extraordinary Consistory of 1985 and the Second Extraordinary Assembly of the Synod of Bishops, also in 1985, the 4th General Conference of the Latin American Episcopate, in 1992.

Arms of Cardinal de Araújo Sales

Chosen by Pope John Paul II, he served as president-delegate of the Special Synod of Bishops for America that was held in 1997.

In addition to his service as papal legate a latere in 1970 and of his legation as president delegate of the Special Assembly for America of the Synod of Bishops in 1997, Sales also served as Special Papal Envoy on three occasions: the first was when, in 1991, he presided over the 12th National Eucharistic Congress of Brazil held in the city of Natal; his second appointment as special papal envoy came after his retirement as Archbishop of Rio, when he represented the Pope during the celebrations held in Aparecida marking three events: the centennial of the Coronation of the image of Our Lady Aparecida by mandate of Pope Pius X in 1904, the 150th anniversary of the proclamation of the dogma of the Immaculate Conception, and a renewed Papal Coronation of the image of Our Lady Aparecida, performed by Sales on behalf of Pope Jonh Paul II; the triple celebration took place on 8 September 2004. Sales' third mission as special papal envoy was performed when he travelled to Braga, Portugal, and there presided, on 8 December 2004 over celebrations commemorating the centennial of the coronation of the image of Our Lady of Sameiro and the sesquicentennial of the dogma of the Immaculate Conception.

As of July 2011, Pope Benedict XVI held three days of prayer and reflection, each on the eve of an ordinary public consistory for the creation of new Cardinals. Although those days of prayer and reflection were not convoked as formal extraordinary consistories, all members of the College of Cardinals (electors and non-electors) were summoned to attend the meetings, together with the prelates that were about to be raised to the cardinalate. Sales attended all three of those meetings, on 23 March 2006, 23 November 2007 and 19 November 2010.

== Retirement ==
In accordance with Canon Law, Sales tendered his resignation from the See of Rio de Janeiro when he became 75 years old in 1995, and he reiterated the letter of resignation a few times in the succeeding years, but Pope John Paul II only accepted Sales' resignation on 25 July 2001. Sales had already completed 80 years of age in the previous year and had thus lost, since 8 November 2000, the right to take part in a papal conclave and his membership in the Dicasteries of the Roman Curia. The fact that he was allowed to continue serving as Archbishop of Rio de Janeiro after that milestone was extremely unusual.

As is the normal practice, by mandate of the Holy See, Sales, now Archbishop emeritus, continued to govern the See of Rio de Janeiro as Apostolic Administrator from the acceptance of his resignation on 25 July 2001 until the installation of his successor on 22 September 2001. Sales's transition to retirement was completed on 3 October 2001 when his resignation from the office of Ordinary to the Faithful of Oriental Rite in Brazil without their own Ordinary was accepted by Pope John Paul II.

At the death of Pope John Paul II, Sales was the second-longest-serving cardinal in the Church and as such, although at 84 unable to vote in the 2005 Papal conclave, he played an important role in the pre-conclave discussions. He presided at one of the funeral masses for John Paul II during the Novemdiales (nine days of mourning for the deceased Pope) as senior Cardinal-Priest present in Rome during the 2005 sede vacante. Also in that capacity, Sales was present in the first and third (non-public) parts of the funeral of Pope John Paul II, and was one of those who signed the rogito (the parchment containing biographical data that was placed inside the papal coffin). Cardinal Stephen Kim Sou-hwan, the then Cardinal Protopriest, was ill and was not present in Rome during the days of the sede vacante. As the next Cardinal in the order of precedence, Sales therefore performed the duties of the Protopriest at that time. Cardinal Kim did manage to arrive for the installation of the new Roman Pontiff, Pope Benedict XVI.

After the death of Cardinal Kim in February 2009, Sales became both the Cardinal protoprete and also the longest serving living Cardinal of the Catholic Church. On 28 April 2009, Sales completed 40 years as a member of the College of Cardinals.

On 8 November 2010 the Archdiocese of Rio de Janeiro held celebrations to commemorate the Cardinal's 90th birthday; by the time of his 90th birthday, Sales was already the last living Cardinal created in the Consistory of 28 April 1969. He was thus the last living person to have been raised to the Cardinalate before the entry into force of the modern form of the Mass promulgated by Pope Paul VI with the Constitution Missale Romanum.

Although retired, Sales still engaged in pastoral activities. He still kept the commitment of writing a weekly article on a topic of faith or morals, which was published in the O Globo newspaper, and as of March 2011 he was still often seen celebrating Mass on Sundays or other holy days in the parish church of Our Lady of Peace in the neighbourhood of Ipanema. That parish church is adjacent to a Church owned office building where Sales maintained an office.

In May 2011 the 90-year-old Cardinal stopped publishing his weekly articles in O Globo (he had written weekly articles for the newspaper for 40 years, since his installation as Archbishop of Rio in 1971) and, on his recommendation, the Archbishop of Rio de Janeiro, Orani João Tempesta, was invited by the owners of the newspaper to continue the religious articles and he agreed to assume that task. Sales' last article was published on 25 April 2011.

== Death ==
Sales died at age 91 during his sleep on 9 July 2012 from a heart attack. His funeral mass and burial were on Wednesday, 11 July 2012, with Rio de Janeiro's current archbishop, Orani João Tempesta, presiding along with the other prelates of the archdiocese.

== Views ==
=== Protests against human rights violations ===
As Archbishop of São Sebastião do Rio de Janeiro from 1971, Sales protested the many human rights violations in Brazil during the period of military rule that lasted from 31 March 1964 to 15 March 1985. His work supporting those tortured by the regime in this era has been only recently noted by historians of Brazil.

=== Fight against dissent ===
Following the fall of the military dictatorship and Pope John Paul II's reining in of theological dissent, Sales became the Church in Brazil's most prominent voice against what he saw as dissent from Catholic moral teaching in the country. In the 1990s he made many efforts to become a cultural leader in this struggle: going so far as to oppose the traditional Carnival in Rio de Janeiro with a "festival of prayer" which he saw as opposing trends towards sexual libertinism in modern Brazil.

Catholic Church titles
Preceded by Augusto da Silva	Archbishop of São Salvador da Bahia; 29 October 1968 – 13 March 1971	Succeeded by Avelar Brandão Vilela
Preceded by Jaime de Barros Câmara	Archbishop of Rio de Janeiro; 13 March 1971 – 25 July 2001	Succeeded by Eusébio Scheid
Preceded by Stephen Kim	Cardinal Protopriest; 16 February 2009 – 9 July 2012	Succeeded by Paulo Evaristo Arns
