= Eusébio Scheid =

Brazilian Catholic cardinal (1932–2021)

His Eminence Eusébio Oscar Scheid S.C.J.
- Archbishop of São Sebastião do Rio de Janeiro
- Church: Roman Catholic Church
- Appointed: 25 July 2001
- Installed: 22 September 2001
- Term ended: 27 February 2009
- Predecessor: Eugênio de Araújo Sales
- Successor: Orani João Tempesta
- Other post: Cardinal Priest of Santi Bonifacio ed Alessio (2003–2021)
- Previous posts: Bishop of São José dos Campos (1981–1991); Archbishop of Florianópolis (1991–2001); Ordinary for the Faithful of Eastern Rites in Brazil (2001–2010)

Orders
- Ordination: 3 July 1960 by Inácio João Dal Monte
- Consecration: 1 May 1981 by Carmine Rocco
- Created cardinal: 21 October 2003 by Pope John Paul II
- Rank: Cardinal priest

Personal details
- Born: 8 December 1932 Luzerna, Santa Catarina, Brazil
- Died: 13 January 2021 (aged 88) São José dos Campos, São Paulo, Brazil
- Education: Pontifical Gregorian University
- Motto: Deus é bom ('God is good')

Styles of Eusébio Scheid
- Reference style: His Eminence
- Spoken style: Your Eminence
- Informal style: Cardinal
- See: Rio de Janeiro

Eusébio Oscar Scheid S.C.J. (8 December 1932 – 13 January 2021) was a Brazilian prelate of the Catholic Church who was Archbishop of Rio de Janeiro from 2001 to 2009. He was raised to the rank of cardinal in 2003. He was previously Bishop of São José dos Campos from 1981 to 1991 and Archbishop of Florianópolis from 1991 to 2001.

== Biography ==
Born in Bom Retiro, Joaçaba, Brazil, to Alberto Reinaldo Scheid and Rosália Joana Scheid, he studied at the Dehonian Fathers' seminary; he earned a doctorate of Sacred Theology in Christology and was ordained a priest in Rome on 3 July 1960. He then taught dogmatic theology and liturgy in Brazil.

On 11 February 1981, Pope John Paul II appointed him Bishop of São José dos Campos and he was consecrated on 1 May 1981.

Appointed Archbishop of Florianópolis on 23 January 1991, he served in that post for ten years before being named Archbishop of São Sebastião do Rio de Janeiro and Ordinary for Eastern-Rite faithful resident in Brazil on 25 July 2001. He officially took over the diocese of Rio de Janeiro on 22 September 2001. In South America, Scheid also served as President of South Region IV of the Brazilian Bishops' Conference and Counsellor of the Pontifical Commission for Latin America (as of 25 November 2002).

Pope John Paul II elevated Scheid to the rank of cardinal in the consistory of 21 October 2003, granting him the title of Cardinal-Priest of Santi Bonifacio e Alessio.

In the months during which the health of Pope John Paul II was failing, Scheid spoke in favor of having an African pope, which many interpreted as support for Francis Arinze. En route to the 2005 conclave, Scheid told an interviewer that he did not think of Brazilian president President Lula as a "true Catholic", but rather "chaotic", since Lula self-identifies as Catholic but does not practice his faith. Lula responded that he was indeed a Catholic and that his relationship with God was of a very personal nature. Asked the same question, Cardinal Cláudio Hummes said that Lula was "Catholic in his own way"; Scheid declined to comment further.

Scheid retired in 2009 from the see of Rio de Janeiro.

After having dealt with age-related illnesses for a few months, Scheid died in São José dos Campos on 13 January 2021. He had tested positive for COVID-19 during the COVID-19 pandemic in São Paulo and been admitted to the hospital on 12 January with a possible case of pneumonia.

== Honors and awards ==
- Santos Dumont Medal (19 September 2002)
- Honorary citizen of the Rio de Janeiro State – conferred by the State's Legislative Assembly on 19 August 2002
- Aeronautical Medal of Honor (23 October 2002)
- The Collar of Judiciary Honor – conferred by the Rio de Janeiro State Judiciary on 8 December 2002
- Pedro Ernesto Medal – conferred by the Rio de Janeiro City Council on 10 September 2003
- Motion of Honor from the Niterói City Council, in honor of his Cardinalate, on 8 October 2003
- Vote of Applause from the Senate of Brazil, in honor of his being made a cardinal, on 7 October 2003
- Motion of Admiration and Congratulations from the Rio de Janeiro City Council, in honor of his being made a cardinal, on 30 October 2003

Catholic Church titles
Preceded by Eugênio de Araújo Sales	Archbishop of Rio de Janeiro; 25 July 2001 – 27 February 2009	Succeeded by Orani João Tempesta
