= Jaime de Barros Câmara =

Brazilian Catholic cardinal

His Eminence Jaime de Barros Câmara
- Archbishop of São Sebastião do Rio de Janeiro
- The then-archbishop pictured in 1943.
- Church: Roman Catholic Church
- Archdiocese: São Sebastião do Rio de Janeiro
- See: São Sebastião do Rio de Janeiro
- Appointed: 3 July 1943
- Installed: 15 September 1943
- Term ended: 18 February 1971
- Predecessor: Sebastião Leme da Silveira Cintra
- Successor: Eugênio de Araújo Sales
- Other posts: Cardinal-Priest of Santi Bonifacio ed Alessio (1946-71); Ordinary of Brazil of the Eastern Rite (1951-71)
- Previous posts: Bishop of Mossoró (1935-41); Archbishop of Belém do Pará (1941-43); Military Vicar of Brazil (1950-63); President of the Brazilian Episcopal Conference (1958-64)

Orders
- Ordination: 1 January 1920 by Joaquim Domingues de Oliveira
- Consecration: 2 February 1936 by Joaquim Domingues de Oliveira
- Created cardinal: 18 February 1946 by Pope Pius XII
- Rank: Cardinal-Priest

Personal details
- Born: Jaime de Barros Câmara; 3 July 1894 São José, Brazil
- Died: 18 February 1971 (aged 76) Palácio Paulino, Aparecida, Brazil
- Buried: Rio de Janeiro Cathedral
- Parents: Joaquim Xavier de Oliveira Cãmara; Anna de Carvalho Barros
- Motto: Ignem veni mittere
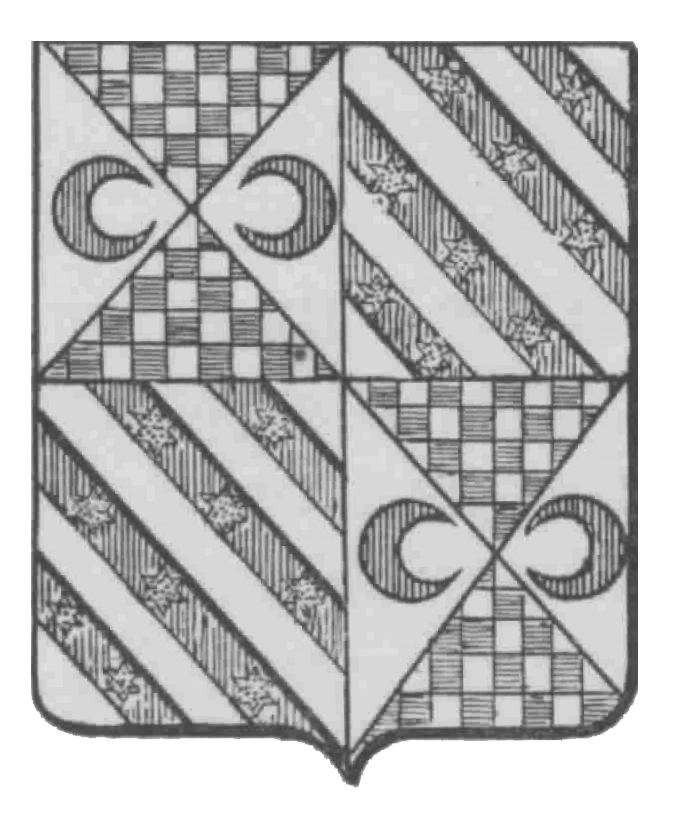
- Coat of arms

Styles of Jaime de Barros Câmara
- Reference style: His Eminence
- Spoken style: Your Eminence
- Informal style: Cardinal
- See: São Sebastião do Rio de Janeiro

Jaime de Barros Câmara (July 3, 1894 – February 18, 1971) was a Brazilian Cardinal of the Roman Catholic Church. He served as Archbishop of São Sebastião do Rio de Janeiro from 1943 to 1971, and was elevated to the cardinalate in 1946 by Pope Pius XII.

== Biography ==
Born in São José, Jaime de Barros Câmara studied at the seminary in São Leopoldo before being ordained to the priesthood by Archbishop Joaquim Domingues de Oliveira on January 1, 1920. After doing pastoral work in Florianópolis until 1935, he was made rector of the seminary in that same city. Câmara was raised to the rank of Privy Chamberlain of His Holiness on April 18, 1935.

On December 19, 1935, Câmara was appointed the first Bishop of Mossoró by Pope Pius XI. He received his episcopal consecration on February 2, 1936, from Archbishop Domingues de Oliveira, with Bishops Pio de Freitas Silveira and Daniel Hostin serving as co-consecrators. Câmara was later named Archbishop of Belém do Pará on September 15, 1941, and Archbishop of São Sebastião do Rio de Janeiro on July 3, 1943.

Pope Pius XII created him Cardinal Priest of Santi Bonifacio ed Alessio in the consistory of February 18, 1946. Câmara was made the first Bishop of the Catholic Military Ordinariate of Brazil on November 6, 1950 (a post which he resigned on November 9, 1963), and the first Ordinary for the Eastern Catholics in Brazil on November 14, 1951. The Cardinal attended the first general conference of the Latin American Episcopal Conference in 1955, served as President of the Brazilian Episcopal Conference from 1958 to 1963, and participated in the conclave of 1958. From 1962 to 1965, he attended the Second Vatican Council, during the course of which he served as a cardinal elector in the 1963 papal conclave that selected Pope Paul VI. Along with Lawrence Shehan, he assisted Leo Joseph Suenens in delivering one of the closing messages of the Council delivered by cardinals on December 8, 1965.

During his tenure as Rio de Janeiro's archbishop, Câmara delivered a televised condemnation of Communism. He was also opposed to gambling and the popular Brazilian religious leader, Alziro Zarur.

In 1971, Cardinal Câmara died while in the city of Aparecida, at age 76. He is buried in metropolitan cathedral of Rio de Janeiro.

Catholic Church titles
Preceded by none	Bishop of Mossoró; 1935–1941	Succeeded by João Portocarrero Costa
Preceded by Antônio de Almeida Lustosa, SDB	Archbishop of Belém do Pará; 1941–1943	Succeeded by Mário de Miranda Villas-Boas
Preceded by Sebastião da Silveira Cintra	Archbishop of São Sebastião do Rio de Janeiro; 1943–1971	Succeeded by Eugênio de Araújo Sales
