= Diocese of Mossoró =

Catholic ecclesiastical territory

Diocese of Mossoró Dioecesis Mossorensis

Catholic
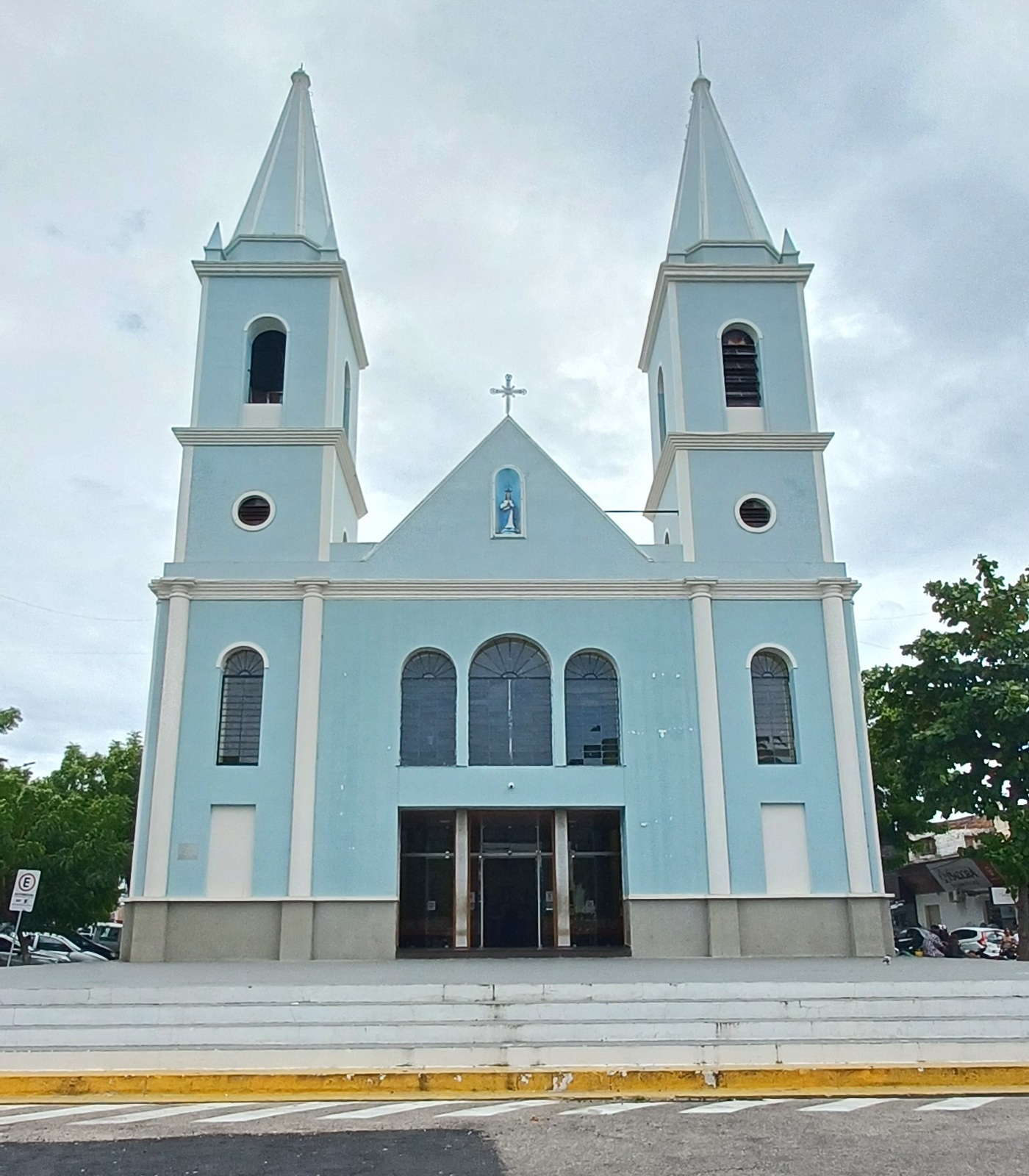
- Cathedral of St. Lucy

Location
- Country: Brazil
- Ecclesiastical province: Natal

Statistics
- Area: 18,832 km^{2} (7,271 sq mi)
- Population: Total; Catholics: (as of 2004); 825,000; 793,000 (96.1%)

Information
- Rite: Latin Rite
- Established: 28 July 1934 (92 years ago)
- Cathedral: Catedral Santa Luzia

Current leadership
- Pope: Leo XIV
- Bishop: Francisco de Sales Alencar Batista, O. Carm.
- Metropolitan Archbishop: João Santos Cardoso

Website
- diocesedemossoro.com

The Roman Catholic Diocese of Mossoró (Latin: Dioecesis Mossorensis) is a diocese located in the city of Mossoró in the ecclesiastical province of Natal in Brazil.

== History ==
- July 28, 1934: Established as Diocese of Mossoró from the Diocese of Natal

== Bishops ==
- Bishops of Mossoró (Roman rite), in reverse chronological order
  - Bishop Francisco de Sales Alencar Batista, O. Carm. (2023.11.18 – present)
  - Bishop Mariano Manzana (2004.10.17 – 2023.11.18)
  - Bishop José Freire de Oliveira Neto (1984.03.14 – 2004.06.15)
  - Bishop Gentil Diniz Barreto (1960.06.11 – 1984.03.14)
  - Bishop Elizeu Simões Mendes (1953.09.19 – 1959.10.17), appointed Bishop of Campo Mourão, Parana
  - Bishop João Batista Portocarrero Costa (1943.07.31 – 1953.07.03), appointed Coadjutor Archbishop of Olinda e Recife, Pernambuco
  - Bishop Jaime de Barros Câmara (1935.12.19 – 1941.09.15), appointed Archbishop of Belém do Pará; future Cardinal)

=== Coadjutor bishop ===
- José Freire de Oliveira Neto (1979-1984)

=== Auxiliary bishop ===
- José Freire de Oliveira Neto (1973-1979), appointed Coadjutor here
