= João d'Avila Moreira Lima =

Brazilian bishop

João d’Avila Moreira Lima
- Titular Bishop of Lesina
- Church: Roman Catholic Church
- See: Titula See of Lesina
- In office: 1982 – 2002
- Predecessor: Emilio Bianchi di Cárcano
- Successor: Current
- Previous post(s): Bishop

Orders
- Ordination: April 8, 1944

Personal details
- Born: August 30, 1919; Itabirito, Brazil
- Died: September 30, 2011 (aged 92)

João d’Avila Moreira Lima (August 30, 1919 – September 30, 2011) was a Brazilian bishop of the Roman Catholic Church.

== Biography ==
Lima was born in Itabirito, Brazil and ordained a priest on April 8, 1944. He was appointed an auxiliary bishop of the Archdiocese of São Sebastião do Rio de Janeiro as well as Titular Bishop on June 21, 1982 and ordained bishop on August 24, 1982. Lima retired as auxiliary bishop from the Archdiocese of São Sebastião do Rio de Janeiro on March 20, 2002.
