= Archdiocese of Rio de Janeiro =

Catholic ecclesiastical territory

Coordinates: 22.9000°S 43.1833°W

Archdiocese of São Sebastião do Rio de Janeiro Archidioecesis Sancti Sebastiani Fluminis Ianuarii

Catholic
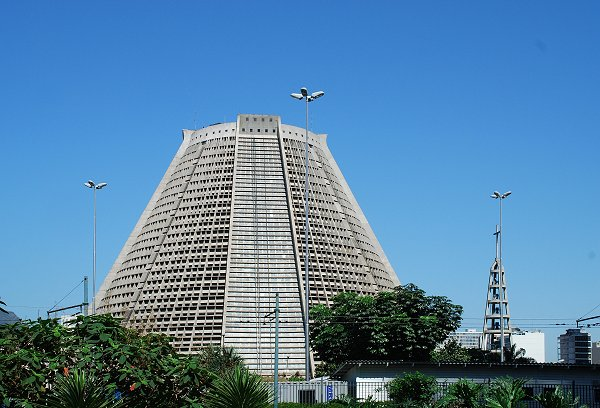
- Metropolitan Cathedral of St. Sebastian

- Coat of arms

Location
- Country: Brazil
- Ecclesiastical province: Province of São Sebastião do Rio de Janeiro

Statistics
- Population: Total; Catholics: (as of 2017); 6,498,837; 3,320,334 (51.1%)

Information
- Denomination: Catholic
- Sui iuris church: Latin Church
- Rite: Roman Rite
- Established: July 19, 1575
- Cathedral: Rio de Janeiro Cathedral
- Patron saint: Saint Sebastian (principal) and Saint Anne (secondary)

Current leadership
- Pope: Leo XIV
- Archbishop: Orani João Tempesta OCist
- Auxiliary Bishops: Roque Costa Souza; Paulo Alves Romão; Zdzisław Stanisław Błaszczyk; Célio da Silveira Calixto Filho; Antônio Luiz Catelan Ferreira; Joselito Ramalho Nogueira; Hiansen Vieira Franco; José Maria Pereira
- Bishops emeritus: Assis Lopes

Website
- arquidiocese.org.br

There is also a Diocese of Rio de Janeiro (and a Bishop of Rio de Janeiro) in the Anglican Episcopal Church of Brazil.

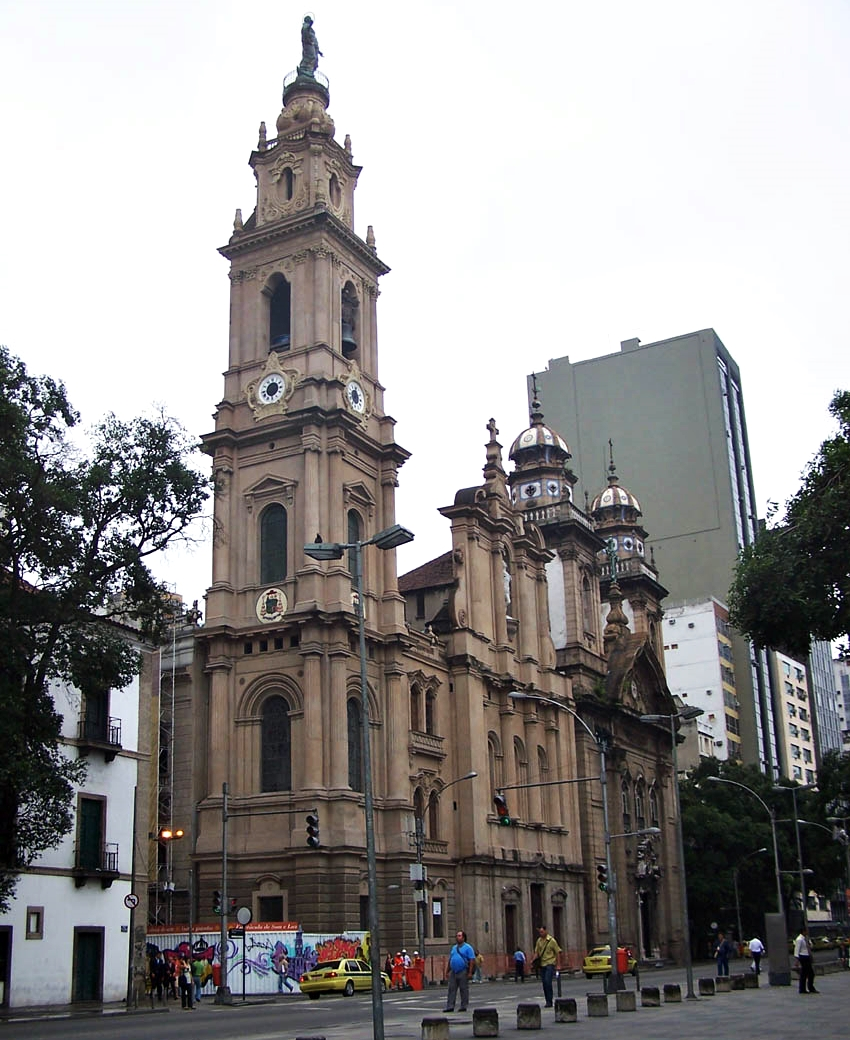
Old Cathedral of Rio de Janeiro

The Archdiocese of São Sebastião do Rio de Janeiro (Latin: Archidioecesis Sancti Sebastiani Fluminis Ianuarii, lit. "Archdiocese of St. Sebastian of Rio de Janeiro") in Brazil was established as a territorial prelature on July 19, 1575. It was elevated to the status of a diocese on November 16, 1676. It was later elevated to a metropolitan archdiocese on April 27, 1892. On May 6, 2003, the territorial abbey of Nossa Senhora do Monserrate do Rio de Janeiro lost its territorial rank and was added to the archdiocese. Cardinal Orani João Tempesta OCist has been its Archbishop since 2009. Cardinal Eusébio Scheid SCI, who died on January 13, 2021, was Archbishop Emeritus.

== Leadership ==
Territorial Prelates

- Bartolomeu Simões Pereira (11 May 1577 Appointed – 1591 Resigned)
- João da Costa (1603 Appointed – 1606 Died)
- Bartholomeu Lagarto (1606 Appointed – 1606 Died)
- Mateus da Costa Aborim (1606 Appointed – 1629 Died)
- Máximo Pereira OSB ( 1629 Appointed – 1629 Died)
- Lourenço de Mendonça (22 Jul 1631 Appointed – 1637 Resigned)
- Pedro Homem Albernaz (1639 Appointed – 1643 Died)
- Antonio de Mariz Loureiro (8 Oct 1643 Appointed – 1657 Died)
- Manuel de Sousa e Almada (12 Dec 1658 Appointed – 1671 Died)
- Francisco da Silveira Dias (1671 Appointed – 14 Dec 1671 Resigned)
- Manuel Pessoa de Figueiredo (15 Feb 1673 Appointed – 28 Aug 1673 Died)

Bishops

- Manoel Pereira OP (22 Nov 1676 Appointed – 1680 Resigned. Manoel Pereira, OP was consecrated a Bishop due to his appointment as Bishop of Rio de Janeiro but he resigned the office in 1680 without ever having taken canonical possession of his see.)
- José de Barros Alarcão (19 Aug 1680 Appointed – 6 Apr 1700 Died. Bishop Alarcão is counted as the first Bishop of Rio de Janeiro, because his predecessor never travelled to the city and never took canonical possession of the newly erected See; Bishop Alarcão was therefore the first Bishop of Rio to be actually installed in the office.)
- Francisco de São Jerõnimo de Andrade SCI (8 Aug 1701 Appointed – 7 Mar 1721 Died)
- Antônio de Guadalupe OFM (21 Feb 1725 Appointed – 31 Aug 1740 Died)
- João da Cruz Salgado de Castilho OCD (19 Dec 1740 Appointed – 4 Dec 1745 Resigned)
- Antônio de Nossa Senhora do Desterro Malheiro OSB (15 Dec 1745 Appointed – 5 Dec 1773 Died)
- José Joaquim Justiniano Mascarenhas Castello Branco (20 Dec 1773 Succeeded – 28 Jan 1805 Died). Then Father Castello Branco had been selected by the King of Portugal and nominated to the Holy See to be coadjutor bishop of Rio de Janeiro, with the right of succession, due to the failing health of bishop Antonio de Nossa Senhora do Desterro Malheiro OSB, on 17 August 1773 (Kings of Portugal had the right of nomination due to the padroado regime, that continued in the imperial era after the independence of Brazil, in accordance with the agreements between the State and the Holy See). Bishop Malheiro died on 5 December 1773 before the Holy See confirmed the nomination of Father Castello Branco as coadjutor bishop. On 20 December 1773, still unaware of the demise of the diocesan Bishop, the Pope granted the confirmation to the nomination of Castello Branco as coadjutor bishop of Rio de Janeiro, and appointed him titular bishop of Tipasa in Mauretania, with the right of succession to the see of Rio de Janeiro. Because of the prior death of the diocesan Bishop, Castello Branco immediately succeeded to the See of Rio de Janeiro upon the confirmation of his appointment as coadjutor Bishop. Accordingly, his appointment as titular bishop became without effect and he at once acquired the jurisdiction of bishop of Rio de Janeiro, in accordance with the norms of canon law then in force, on 20 December 1773. Because he was still only a priest, he was consecrated as Bishop on 30 January 1774.
- José Caetano da Silva Coutinho (26 Aug 1806 Appointed – 27 Jan 1833 Died. From 1808 to 1822 he also served as Major Chaplain of the Royal Chapel, providing religious services to the Portuguese Royal Court then established in Rio de Janeiro. After the independence of Brazil, the Royal Chapel became the Imperial Chapel, continuing under the leadership of the Bishop of Rio de Janeiro. Accordingly, Bishop José Caetano da Silva Coutinho became Major Chaplain of the Imperial Chapel, serving the Brazilian Imperial Family, from 1822 until his death. Due to holding those royal and imperial offices he was known as Bishop Major Chaplain.) He was also elected for life as a Senator of the Empire of Brazil in 1826, and, chosen by his peers, served as the President of the Senate from 1827 to 1832.
- Manoel de Monte Rodrigues de Araújo, later Count of Irajá (23 Dec 1839 Appointed – 11 Jun 1863 Died. Also served ex officio as Major Chaplain of the Imperial Chapel during his tenure as Bishop of Rio de Janeiro, and was accordingly known as The Bishop Major Chaplain.) Created Count of Irajá in the Peerage of the Empire of Brazil in 1845.
- Pedro Maria de Lacerda, later Count of Santa Fé (24 Sep 1868 Appointed – 12 Nov 1890 Died. Also served as Major Chaplain of the Imperial Chapel from the start of his tenure as Bishop of Rio de Janeiro until the abolition of the Monarchy in 1889, holding during that period the title of Bishop Major Chaplain.) Created Count of Santa Fé in the Peerage of the Empire of Brazil in 1888.
- José Pereira da Silva Barros, Count of Santo Agostinho (25 Jun 1891 Appointed – 1 Sep 1893 Resigned. During his tenure, in 1892, the Diocese was raised to the rank of Metropolitan Archdiocese; however he was not promoted to the rank of Metropolitan Archbishop, and continued leading the particular Church as Bishop, until the acceptance of his resignation on 1 September 1893. Days later, on 12 September 1893, the first Metropolitan Archbishop of Rio de Janeiro was appointed.) Bishop José Pereira da Silva Barros had been created Count of Santo Agostinho in the Peerage of the Empire of Brazil in 1888, before he was named Bishop of Rio de Janeiro, while serving as Bishop of Olinda and Recife. He was appointed Titular Archbishop after his resignation from the See of Rio de Janeiro.

Metropolitan Archbishops

Since Pope Pius X appointed Archbishop Joaquim Arcoverde de Albuquerque Cavalcanti a cardinal in 1905, all his successors who were not already cardinals have been made cardinals while archbishop.

- João Fernando Santiago Esberrard (12 Sep 1893 Appointed – 22 Jan 1897 Died)
- Cardinal Joaquim Arcoverde de Albuquerque Cavalcanti (24 Aug 1897 Appointed – 18 Apr 1930 Died. Created Cardinal in 1905)
- Cardinal Sebastião Leme da Silveira Cintra (18 Apr 1930 Succeeded – 17 Oct 1942 Died. Created Cardinal in 1930)
- Cardinal Jaime de Barros Câmara (3 Jul 1943 Appointed – 18 Feb 1971 Died. Created Cardinal in 1946)
- Cardinal Eugênio de Araújo Sales (13 Mar 1971 Appointed – 25 Jul 2001 Retired. He had been created Cardinal in 1969)
- Cardinal Eusébio Scheid SCI (25 Jul 2001 Appointed – 27 Feb 2009 Retired. Created Cardinal in 2003)
- Cardinal Orani João Tempesta OCist (27 Feb 2009 Appointed – Incumbent. Created Cardinal in 2014)

=== Coadjutor bishops ===
- Vicente da Gamal Leao (1756–1773), did not succeed to see
- José Joaquim Justiniano Mascarenhas Castello Branco (1773)
- Sebastião da Silveira Cintra (1921–1930), coadjutor archbishop; future Cardinal

=== Auxiliary bishops ===
Current

- Antônio Augusto Dias Duarte (2005–present)
- Roque Costa Souza (2012–present)
- Joel Portella Amado (2016–present)
- Paulo Alves Romão (2016–present)
- Juarez Delorto Secco (2017–present)
- Paulo Celso Dias do Nascimento (2017–present)
- Zdzisław Stanisław Błaszczyk (2019–present)
- Célio da Silveira Calixto Filho (2020–present)
- Antônio Luiz Catelan Ferreira (2021-present)
- Joselito Ramalho Nogueira (2025-present)
- Hiansen Vieira Franco (2025-present)
- José Maria Pereira (2025-present)

Former

- Joaquim Silvério de Souza (1909-1910), as Archbishop (personal title); appointed Archbishop (personal title) of Diamantina
- Sebastião da Silveira Cintra (1911-1916), appointed Archbishop of Olinda (later returned here as Coadjutor and then Archbishop); future Cardinal
- Rosalvo Costa Rêgo (1946-1954), elevated to Archbishop in 1952
- Jorge Marcos de Oliveira (1946-1954), appointed Bishop of Santo André, Sao Paulo
- Hélder Pessoa Câmara (1952-1964), elevated to Archbishop in 1955; appointed Archbishop of Olinda e Recife, Pernambuco
- José Vicente Távora (1954-1957), appointed Bishop of Aracajú
- Othon Motta (1955-1959), appointed Coadjutor Bishop of Campanha, Minas Gerais
- Wilson Laus Schmidt (1957-1962), appointed Bishop of Chapecó, Santa Catarina
- Honorato Piazera, SCI (1959-1961), appointed Bishop of Nova Iguaçu, Rio de Janeiro
- José Gonçalves da Costa, CSsR (1962-1969), appointed Bishop of Presidente Prudente, Sao Paulo
- Cândido Rubens Padín, OSB (1962-1966), appointed Bishop of Lorena, Sao Paulo
- Waldyr Calheiros Novaes (de Novais) (1964-1966), appointed Bishop of Barra do Piraí-Volta Redonda, Rio de Janeiro
- José Alberto Lopes de Castro Pinto (1964-1976), appointed Bishop of Guaxupé, Minas Gerais
- Alberto Trevisan, SAC (1966-1973)
- Mário Teixeira Gurgel, SDS (1967-1971), appointed Bishop of Itabira
- Eduardo Koaik (1973-1979), appointed Coadjutor Bishop of Piracicaba, Sao Paulo
- Karl Josef Romer (1975-2002), appointed Secretary of the Pontifical Council for the Family
- Carlos Alberto Etchandy Gimeno Navarro (1975-1981), appointed Bishop of Campos, Rio de Janeiro
- Celso José Pinto da Silva (1978-1981), appointed Bishop of Vitória da Conquista, Bahia
- Affonso Felippe Gregory (1979-1987), appointed Bishop of Imperatriz, Maranhão
- João d'Avila Moreira Lima (1982-2002)
- José Palmeira Lessa (1982-1987), appointed Bishop of Propriá, Sergipe
- José Carlos de Lima Vaz, SJ (1986-1995), appointed Bishop of Petrópolis, Rio de Janeiro
- Narbal da Costa Stencel (1987-2002)
- Rafael Llano Cifuentes (1990-2004), appointed Bishop of Nova Friburgo, Rio de Janeiro
- Augusto José Zini Filho (1994-2003), appointed Bishop of Limeira, Sao Paulo
- Filippo Santoro (1995-2004), appointed Bishop of Petrópolis, Rio de Janeiro
- Wilson Tadeu Jönck, SCI (2003-2010), appointed Bishop of Tubarão, Santa Catarina
- Dimas Lara Barbosa (2003-2011), appointed Archbishop of Campo Grande, Mato Grosso do Sul
- Assis Lopes (2003-2011)
- Edney Gouvêa Mattoso (2005-2010), appointed Bishop of Nova Friburgo, Rio de Janeiro
- Edson de Castro Homem (2005-2015), appointed Bishop of Iguatú, Ceara
- Nelson Francelino Ferreira (2010-2014), appointed Bishop of Valença, Rio de Janeiro
- Pedro Cunha Cruz (2010-2015), appointed Coadjutor Bishop of Campanha, Minas Gerais
- Paulo Cezar Costa (2010-2016), appointed Bishop of São Carlos, Sao Paulo
- Luiz Henrique da Silva Brito (2012-2019), appointed Bishop of Barra do Piraí-Volta Redonda, Rio de Janeiro

=== Other priests of this diocese who became bishops ===
- Luiz Antônio dos Santos, appointed Bishop of Fortaleza (Ceará) in 1860
- Eduardo Duarte e Silva, appointed Bishop of Goiás in 1891
- Carlos Duarte Costa, appointed Bishop of Botucatu in 1924
- João Batista da Mota e Albuquerque, appointed Bishop of Espírito Santo in 1957

== Suffragan dioceses ==
- Diocese of Barra do Piraí-Volta Redonda
- Diocese of Duque de Caxias
- Diocese of Itaguaí
- Diocese of Nova Iguaçu
- Diocese of Valença
