= Military Cathedral of St. Mary Queen of Peace, Brasília =

Military Cathedral of St. Mary Queen of Peace
- Catedral Militar Santa Maria dos Militares Rainha da Paz
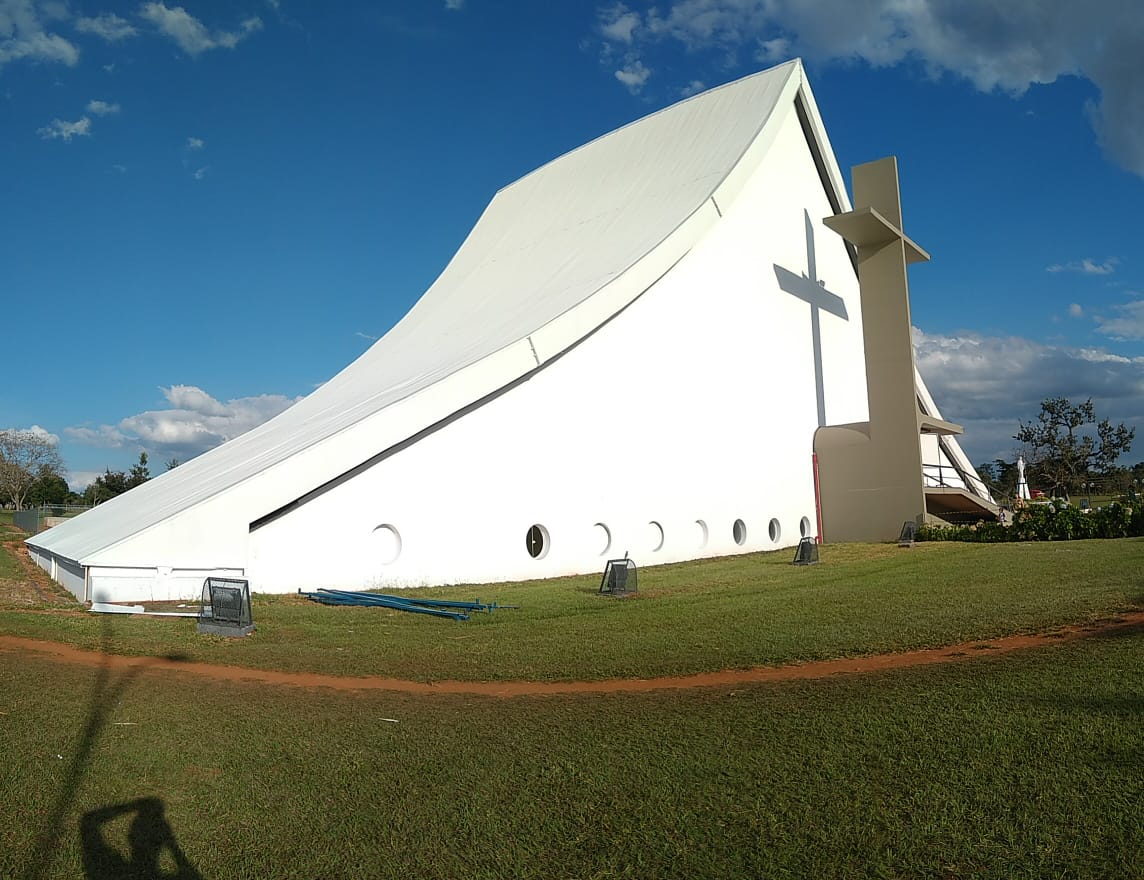
- Military Cathedral
- Military Cathedral of St. Mary Queen of Peace
- Location: Brasília
- Country: Brazil
- Denomination: Roman Catholic Church
- Website: Catedral Rainha da Paz

Administration
- Diocese: Military Ordinariate of Brazil

The Military Cathedral of St. Mary Queen of Peace (also Military Cathedral of Brasília; Portuguese: Catedral Militar Santa Maria dos Militares Rainha da Paz) is a Roman Catholic church in the city of Brasília, the capital of Brazil.

It is located on the west side, between the N1 and S1 tracks of the Monumental Axis, close to the Urban Military Sector (SMU).

It was designed by the Brazilian architect Oscar Niemeyer and inaugurated on September 12, 1994. It belongs to the Military Ordinariate of Brazil and has as archbishop Marcony Vinícius Ferreira.

Its architecture in triangular format refers to a tent. Pope John Paul II laid the foundation stone in 1991 during his visit to Brazil.

== See also ==
- Roman Catholicism in Brazil
- Military Ordinariate of Brazil
