= Old Cathedral of Rio de Janeiro =

Roman Catholic church in Rio de Janeiro, Brazil

Igreja de Nossa Senhora do Monte Carmo da Antiga Sé
- Church of Our Lady of Mount Carmel of the Ancient See
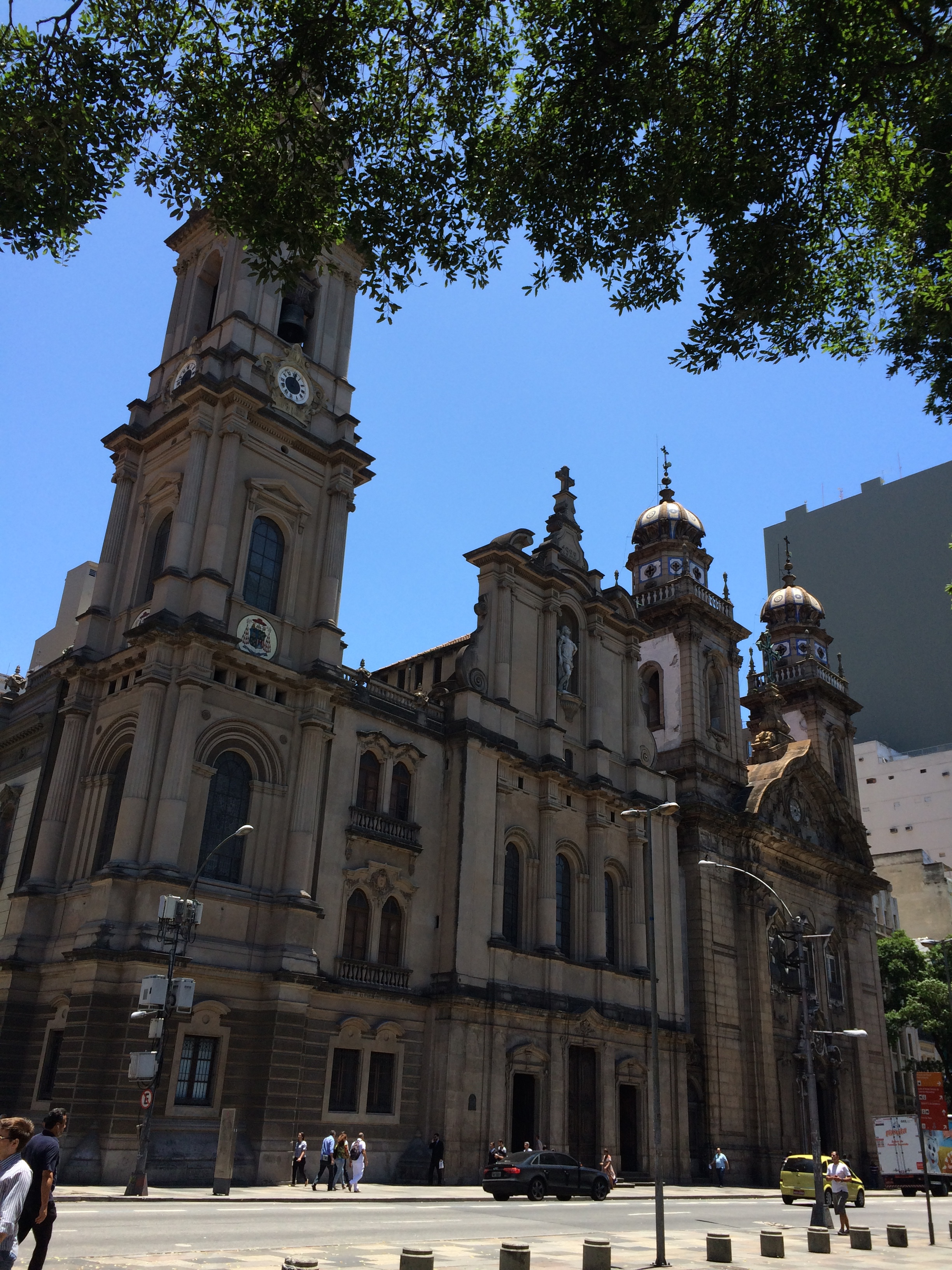

Religion
- Affiliation: Roman Catholic
- Province: Archdiocese of São Sebastião do Rio de Janeiro
- Year consecrated: 1761
- Status: Active

Location
- Location: Rio de Janeiro, Brazil
- Interactive map of Igreja de Nossa Senhora do Monte Carmo da Antiga Sé
- Coordinates: 22°54′12″S 43°10′32″W

Architecture
- Architect: Manuel Alves Setúbal
- Style: Baroque
- Completed: 1770

The Old Cathedral of Rio de Janeiro dedicated to Our Lady of Mount Carmel (full name in Portuguese: Igreja de Nossa Senhora do Monte do Carmo da antiga Sé, lit. 'Church of Our Lady of Mount Carmel of the Ancient See') is an old Carmelite church which served as cathedral (Sé) of Rio de Janeiro from around 1808 until 1976. During the 19th century, it was also used successively as Royal and Imperial Chapel by the Portuguese Royal Family and the Brazilian Imperial Family, respectively. It is located in the Praça XV square, in downtown Rio. It is one of the most important historical buildings in the city.

== History ==
=== Carmelite Church in the Colonial era ===
When the Carmelite Order arrived in Rio in 1590, they settled in a small chapel near Guanabara Bay. During the 17th and 18th centuries, the order built a large convent and renovated the chapel, referred to as the Igreja de Nossa Senhora do Monte do Carmo (Church of Our Lady of Mount Carmel). Building of the present church started around 1761, and was probably directed by Portuguese architect Manuel Alves Setúbal. The church was consecrated in 1770, still with the façade unfinished. The inner decoration, in gilded woodwork in Rococo style, was carved after 1785 by master Inácio Ferreira Pinto, one of the main sculptors of 18th-century Rio de Janeiro.

The Church is adjacent to the Carmelite Convent; the religious services of the Carmelites housed in the convent took place in the neighboring Church. In the 18th century, another church, the Church of the Third Order of the Carmelites was built immediately next to the already existing Carmelite church. The three buildings thus formed a Carmelite complex, integrated by the Carmelite Convent, the Carmelite Church (occupying the central position among the three buildings), and the Church of the Carmelite Third Order. The Vice-Regal Palace, the seat of the Portuguese colonial administration of Brazil (subsequently renamed as Royal Palace and Imperial Palace), stood in the square facing the Church and the complex of Carmelite religious buildings.

=== Royal Chapel and Cathedral ===
In 1808, prince regent John, the future King John VI of Portugal and his court arrived in Rio, fleeing Napoleonic troops which had invaded Portugal. Several of the buildings of Rio started being used by the Portuguese court, including the old Vice-Regal Palace (now known as Paço Imperial), the Carmelite Convent (in which the Prince Regent's mother, Queen Maria I of Portugal, was housed) and the nearby Carmelite Church, which was converted into a Royal Chapel and soon afterwards into the new Cathedral of Rio.

As Royal Chapel, the then Cathedral was a witness to several important events in this period. The Funeral Rites after the death of Queen Maria I in March 1816, and the Te Deum following the solemnity of the Acclamation of her son and heir, John VI, as King of the United Kingdom of Portugal, Brazil and the Algarves (6 February 1818) are among them. Prince Pedro, future Emperor of Brazil as Pedro I and Archduchess Leopoldina of Austria received the nuptial blessing in the chapel on 6 November 1817, having previously entered into marriage by proxy.

=== Imperial Chapel ===
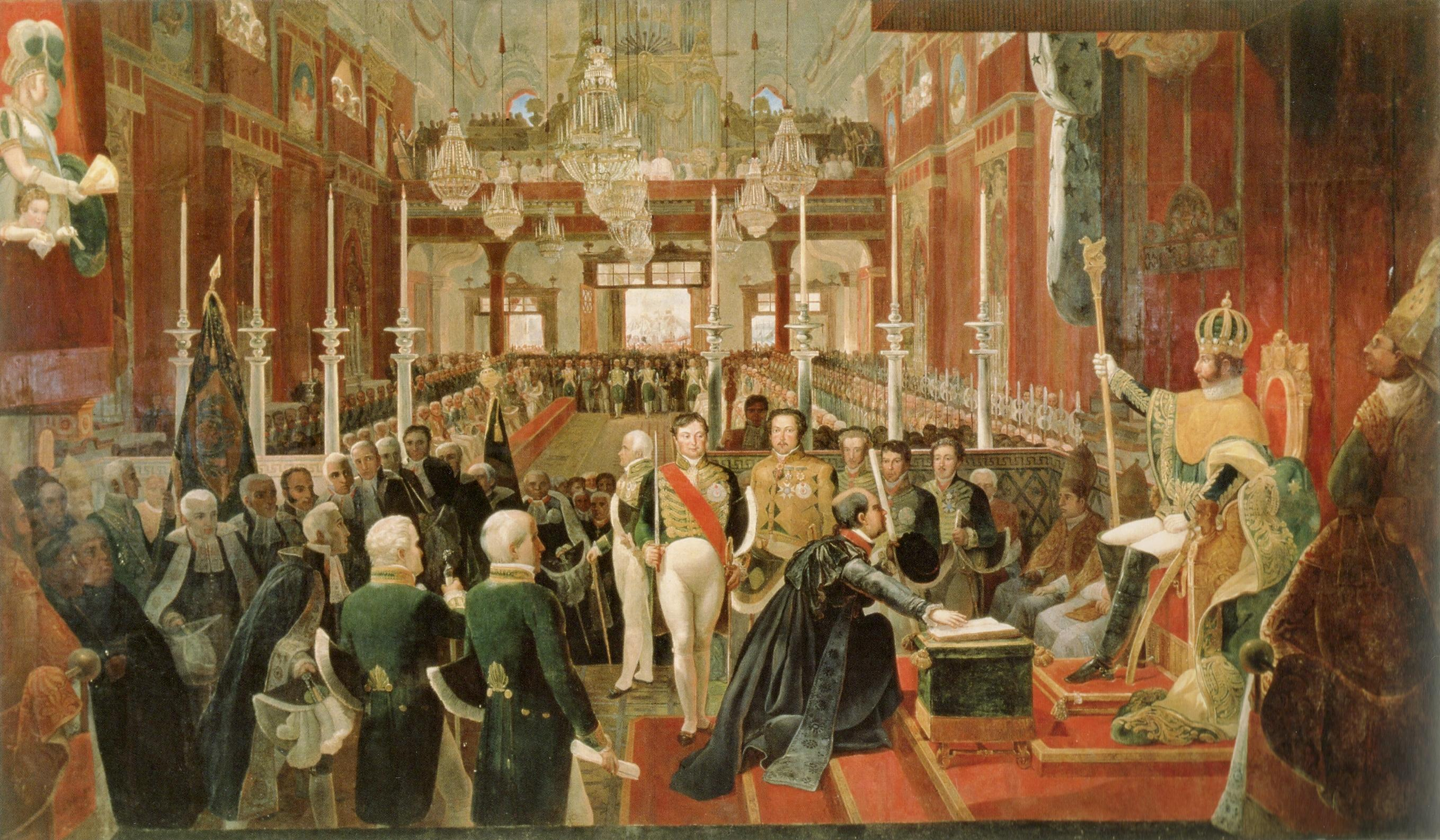
Coronation ceremony of Emperor Pedro I on December 1, 1822. Painting by Jean Baptiste Debret.

With the declaration of the Independence of Brazil in 1822 and the foundation of the Empire of Brazil, the Cathedral church became the Imperial Chapel. The façade was completed around this time by Portuguese architect Pedro Alexandre Cavroé, who added a pediment in Neoclassical style to the church.

Important events in the Imperial Chapel include the coronations of Emperor Pedro I (on 1 December 1822) and his successor, Pedro II (on 18 July 1841); the signing of the Constitution of the Empire of Brazil, followed by the Emperor's oath to the Constitution and by a Te Deum (on 25 March 1824); the bestowal of the Nuptial Blessing upon Emperor Pedro I and his second wife, Empress Amélia (on 16 October 1829; the couple having previously entered into marriage by proxy); the bestowal of the Nuptial Blessing upon Emperor Pedro II and his wife Empress Teresa Cristina (on 4 September 1843; the couple having previously entered into marriage by proxy); and the wedding of Isabel, Princess Imperial of Brazil with Gaston, comte d'Eu (on 15 October 1864).

The Coronation Masses of Emperors Pedro I and Pedro II, in 1822 and 1841, respectively, remain, to this day, the only two Christian rites of Coronation to have taken place in the South American continent, and both were held in the Imperial Chapel.

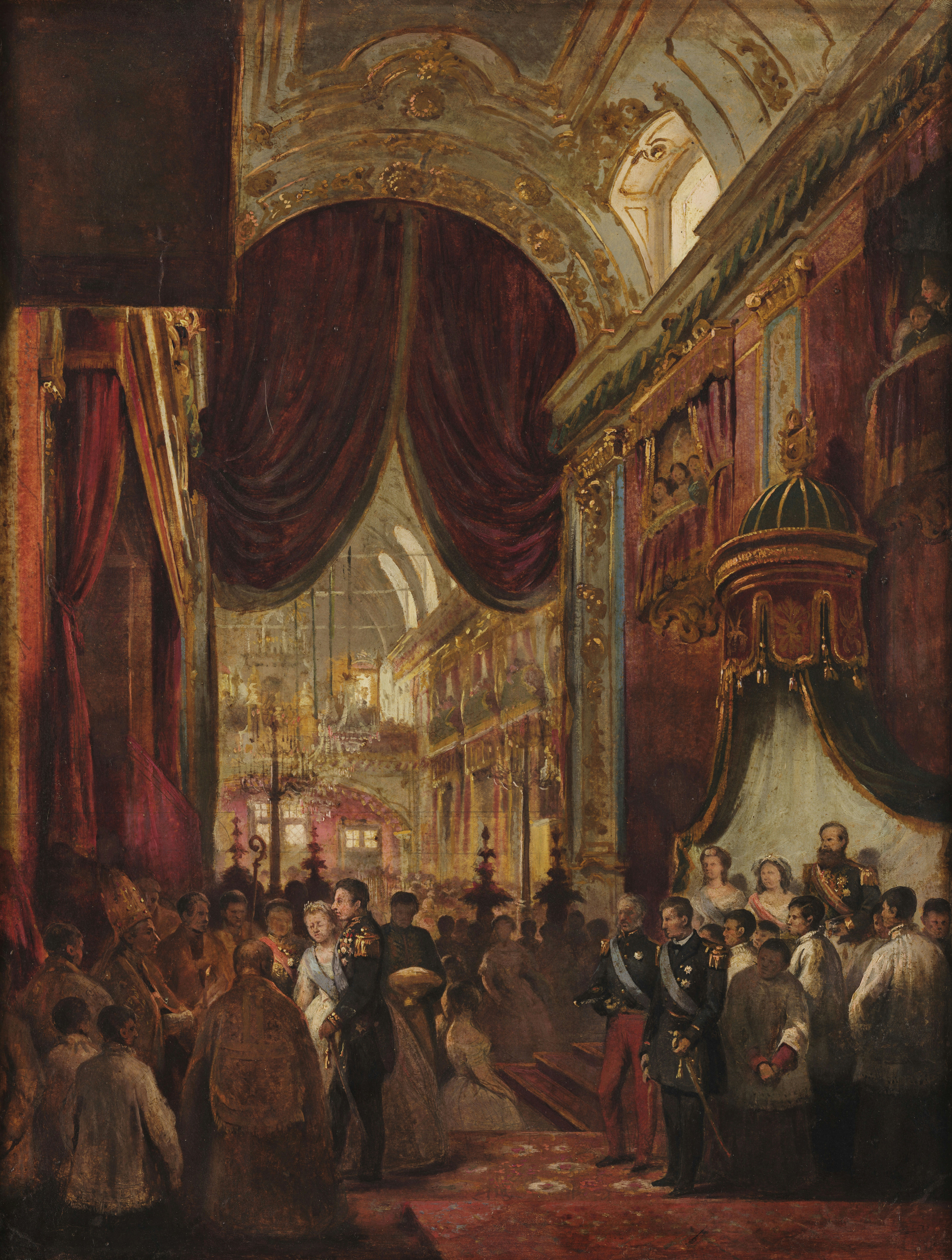
Wedding of Isabel, Princess Imperial and Prince Gaston, Count of Eu in 1864, painted by Victor Meirelles.

Due to the double role of the church as the city's cathedral and as the Imperial Chapel where the emperors of Brazil and the imperial court worshipped and where religious ceremonies of State were held, the bishops of Rio de Janeiro were also appointed during that period to the office of major chaplain to the imperial court, and a bishop of Rio de Janeiro, during that period, was accordingly known by the title of bishop major chaplain.

Brazil's Imperial Parliament (the General Assembly) also worshipped at the Imperial Chapel. In particular, an annual Solemn Mass of the Holy Spirit was celebrated there in the presence of members of the Senate and of the Chamber of Deputies, before the ceremony of the opening of Parliament, when the Emperor appeared in full regalia in the Senate Chamber to deliver his Speech from the Throne. In the first year of a new Legislature, the Mass of the Holy Spirit was celebrated on the first day of the preparatory meetings of the General Assembly, before both Houses elected its presiding officers and before the date of the Speech from the Throne: in that case the members of both Houses took their oaths of office during the Solemn Mass.

=== Republic ===
With coup d'état that proclaimed Brazil a Republic (15 November 1889), the church lost its title of Imperial Chapel but remained the Cathedral of Rio de Janeiro. Shortly thereafter, the Provisional Government of the Republic issued the decree on the Separation of Church and State (7 January 1890). Accordingly, in the new republican era, the Cathedral was no longer the site of State ceremonies.

Still, in the following decades, the Brazilian people, and the population of the city of Rio de Janeiro, remained predominantly Catholic, and so the Cathedral retained its prestige and cultural significance. Furthermore, until the transfer of the Federal Capital to the newly built city of Brasília in 1960, Rio de Janeiro remained the Capital of Brazil, and so the church retained, until 1960, the status as the Cathedral of the Nation's capital city.

With the elevation of the Diocese of St. Sebastian of Rio de Janeiro to the rank of a Metropolitan Archdiocese in 1892, the Cathedral gained the status of Metropolitan Cathedral of the new ecclesiastical province.

In 1905, with the elevation of the then Archbishop of Rio, Joaquim Arcoverde de Albuquerque Cavalcanti, to the rank of Cardinal of the Holy Roman Church (the first Brazilian member of the College of Cardinals), the Church became the first seat of a Cardinal in Brazil.

The façades of the church were remodelled in the early decades of the 20th century. A large statue of the Virgin Mary sits atop the present tower, which was rebuilt between 1905 and 1913 by the Italian architect Rafael Rebecchi. The main and lateral façades were also extensively altered during this period.

In 1976, when the modern Rio de Janeiro Cathedral was completed, the church lost its status as seat of the Archdiocese of São Sebastião do Rio de Janeiro, and became known as the Old Cathedral ("Antiga Sé", literally "Old See"). However, it has remained one of the most important historical churches in Rio and in all of Brazil. The Old Cathedral is now a parish church, and ranks as a proto-cathedral. Its status as a proto-cathedral is marked by the inclusion of a reference to the Ancient See in the church's present official name: Church of Our Lady of Mount Carmel of the Ancient See.

== Notable characteristics ==
=== Art ===
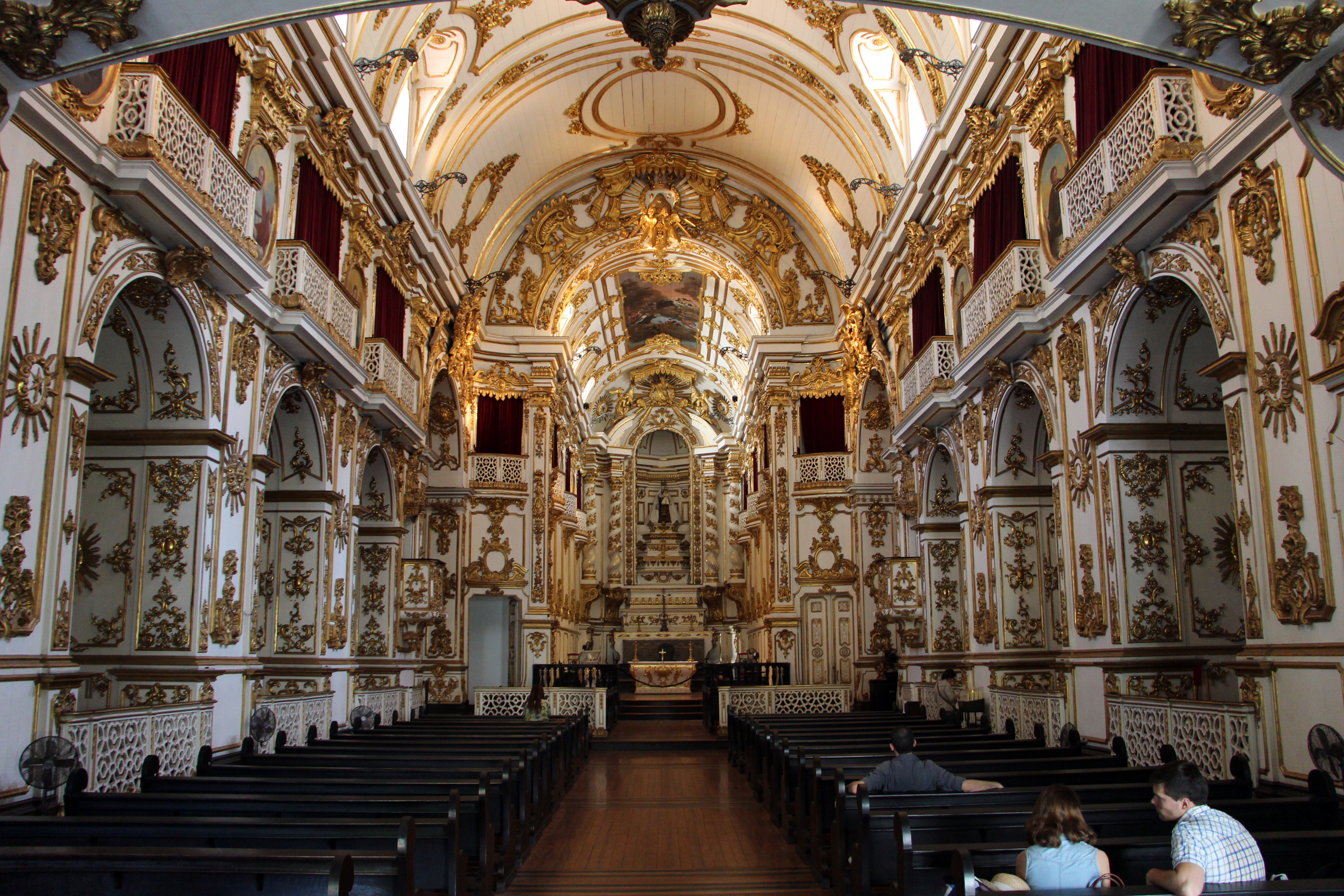
Interior

The Old Cathedral of Rio de Janeiro, apart from being of exceptional historical value for the city and the country, has one of the most harmonious interior decorations among the churches in Rio. The walls, chapels and ceiling are covered with ornate Rococo (late Baroque) woodwork showing lightness and unity in style. The decoration was executed after 1785, mainly by one of Rio's best Rococo wood carvers of the period, Inácio Ferreira Pinto. He was also responsible for the main altarpiece. The upper walls of the one-aisled nave have a series of balconies and oval paintings of the Apostles by painter José Leandro de Carvalho.

Later reforms did not substantially alter the inner decoration, but the façades were almost completely remodelled in the early 20th century. Only the lower part of the main façade, with its three portals, is still original.

=== Music ===
The Old Cathedral of Rio was an important setting for classical music in Brazil. In 1808 the Brazilian composer Father José Maurício Nunes Garcia (1767–1830) was appointed Master of the Royal Chapel by Prince Regent John. Father José Maurício is considered the best composer of the period. He was later replaced by another important musical figure, the Portuguese Marcos Portugal (1762–1830).

== Gallery ==
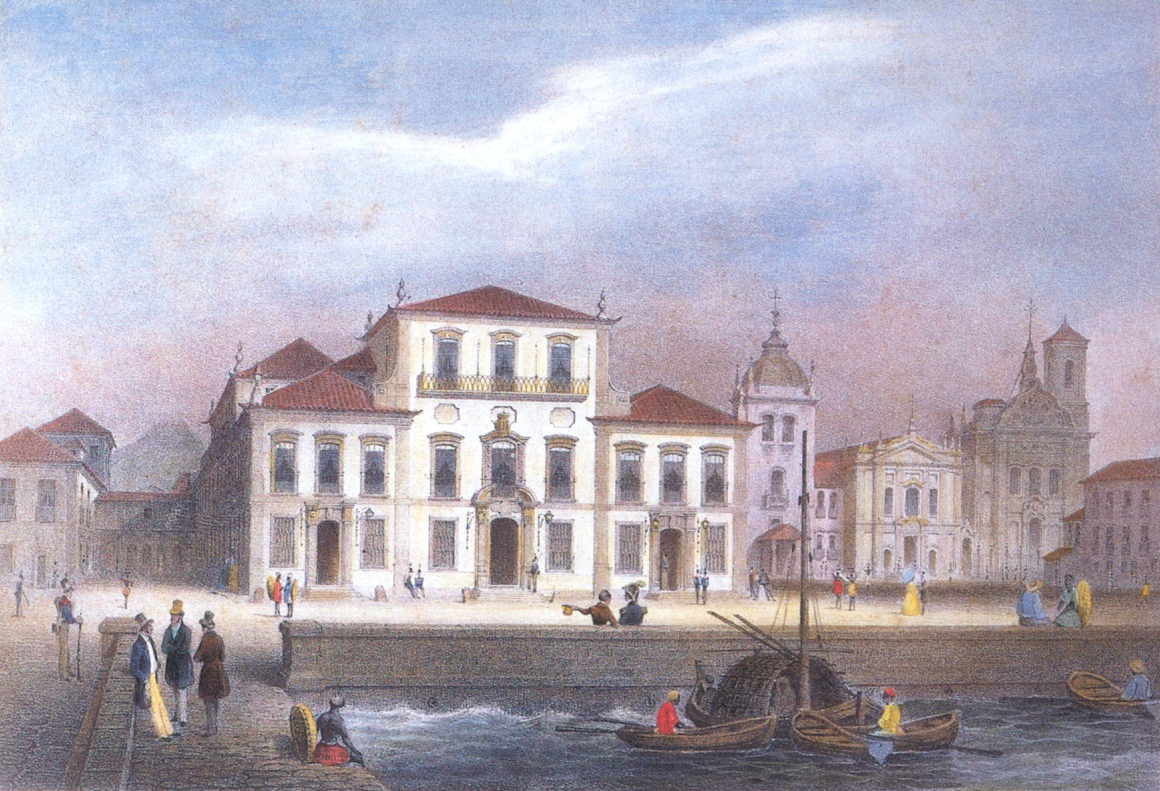
Paço Imperial, the official workplace of the monarchs of Brazil and the then Royal Chapel at right, 1818

Wedding of Emperor Pedro I and Amélie of Leuchtenberg in 1829

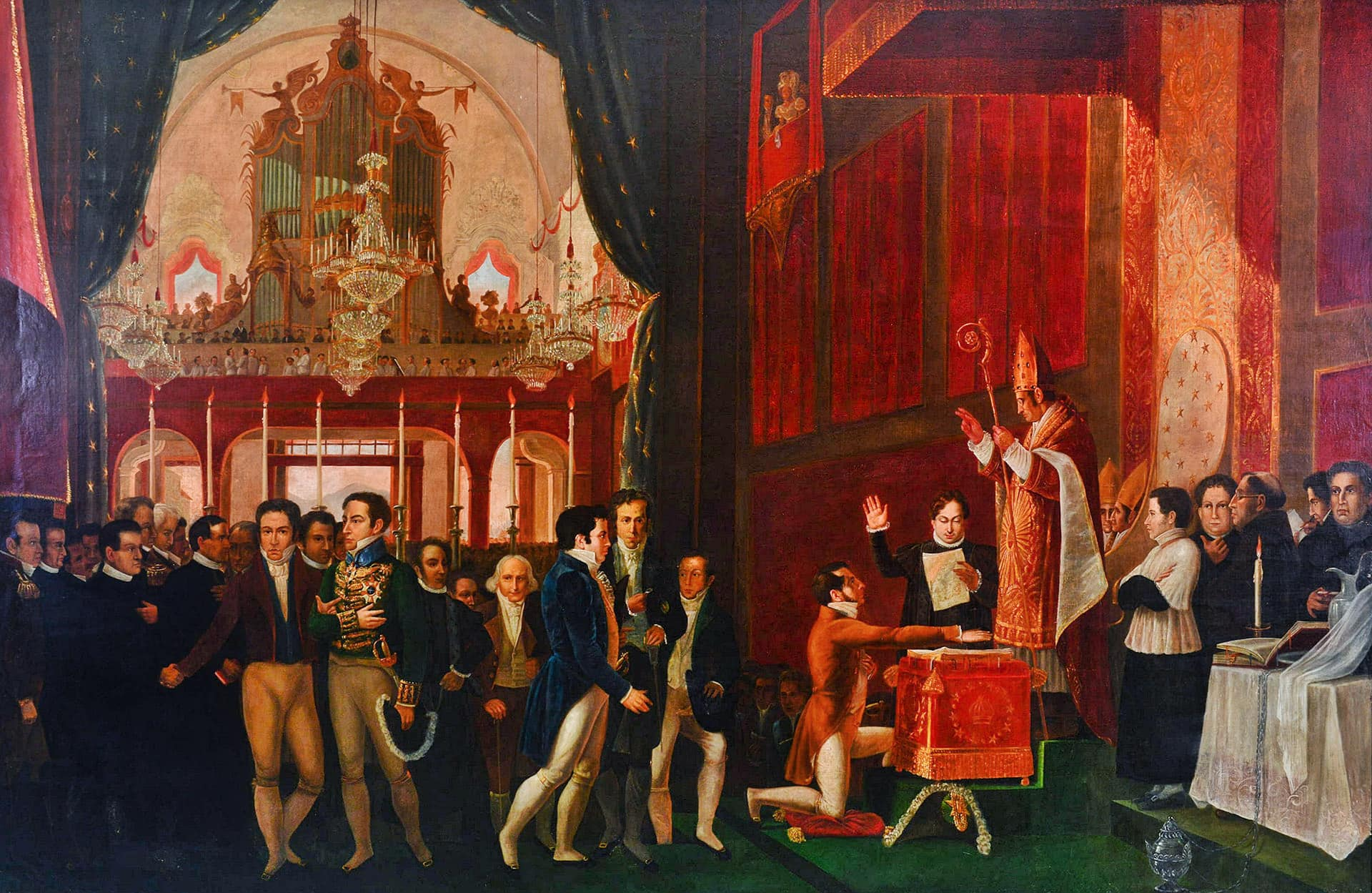
The oath of the provisional triumviral regents of the Empire of Brazil in the chapel in 1831, at the beginning of the Regency period.

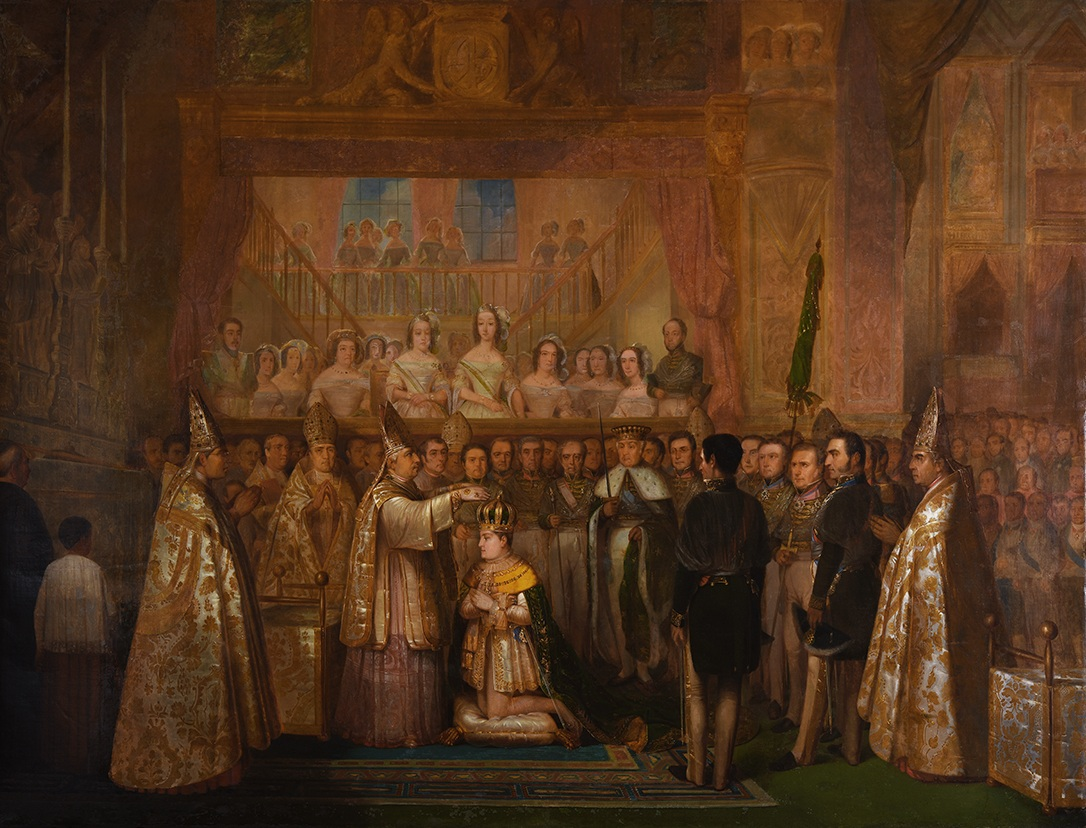
Coronation of Pedro II, 1842

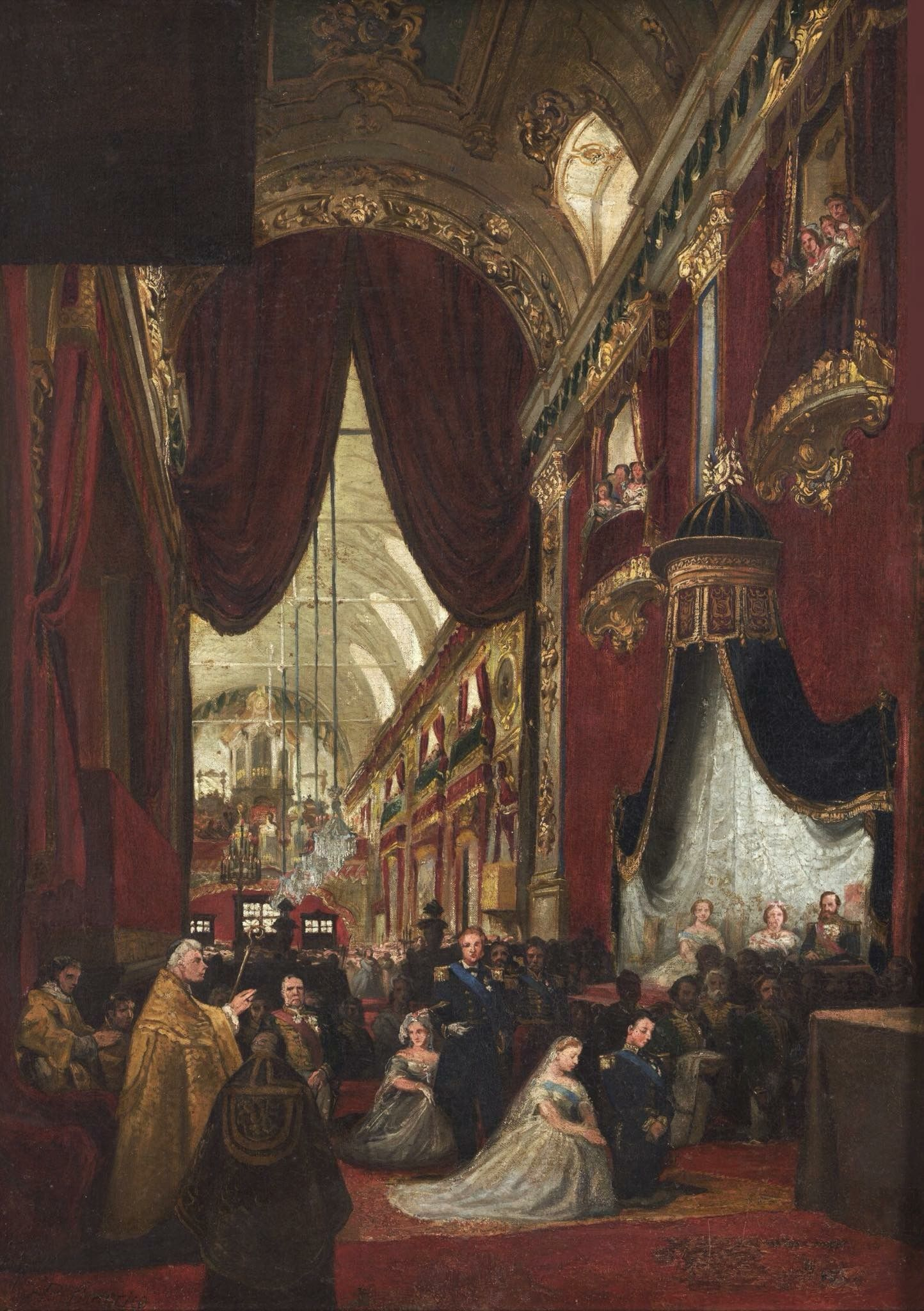
Wedding of Princess Isabel and Prince Gaston in 1864, painted by Pedro Américo. Another version of the same event in the image above in the article.

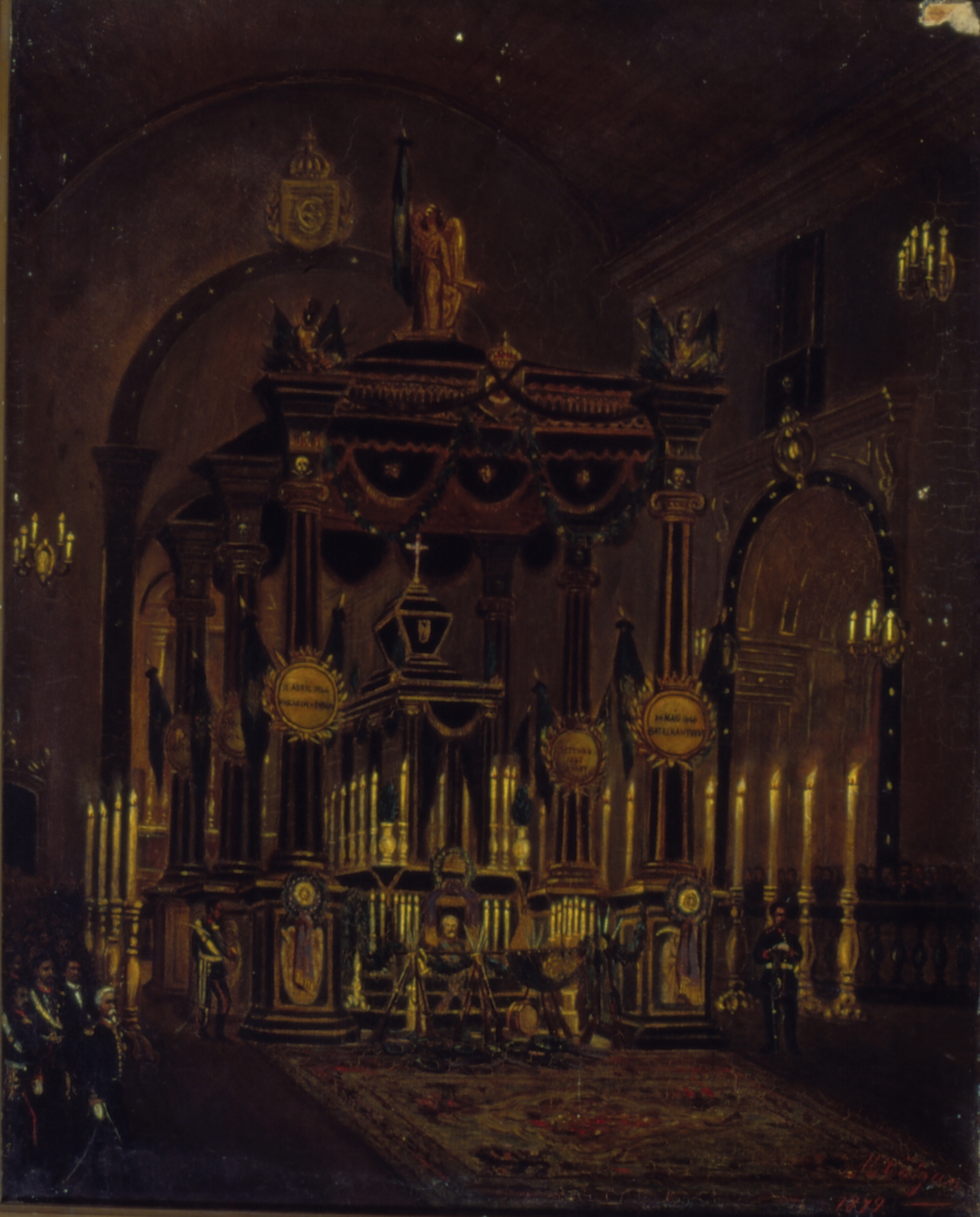
Funeral of the Marquis of Erval, 1879

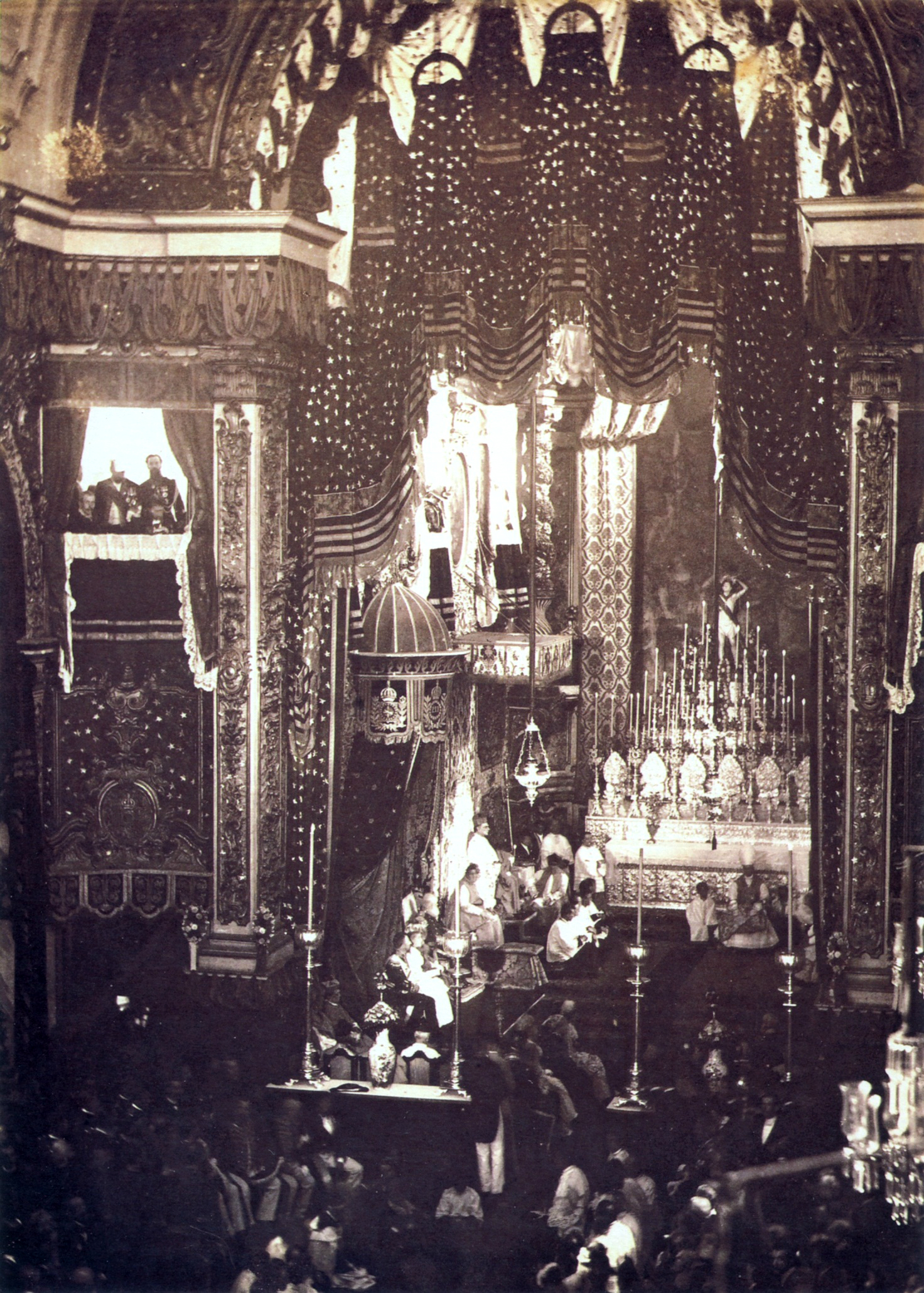
Delivery of the Golden Rose sent by Pope Leo XIII to Princess Isabel, April 1889.

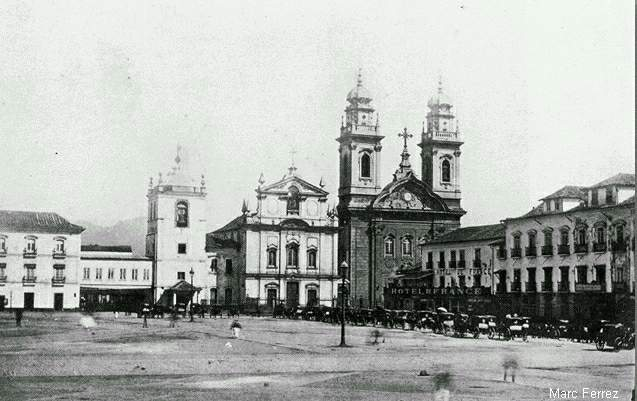
View from Carmo Square, c. 1890

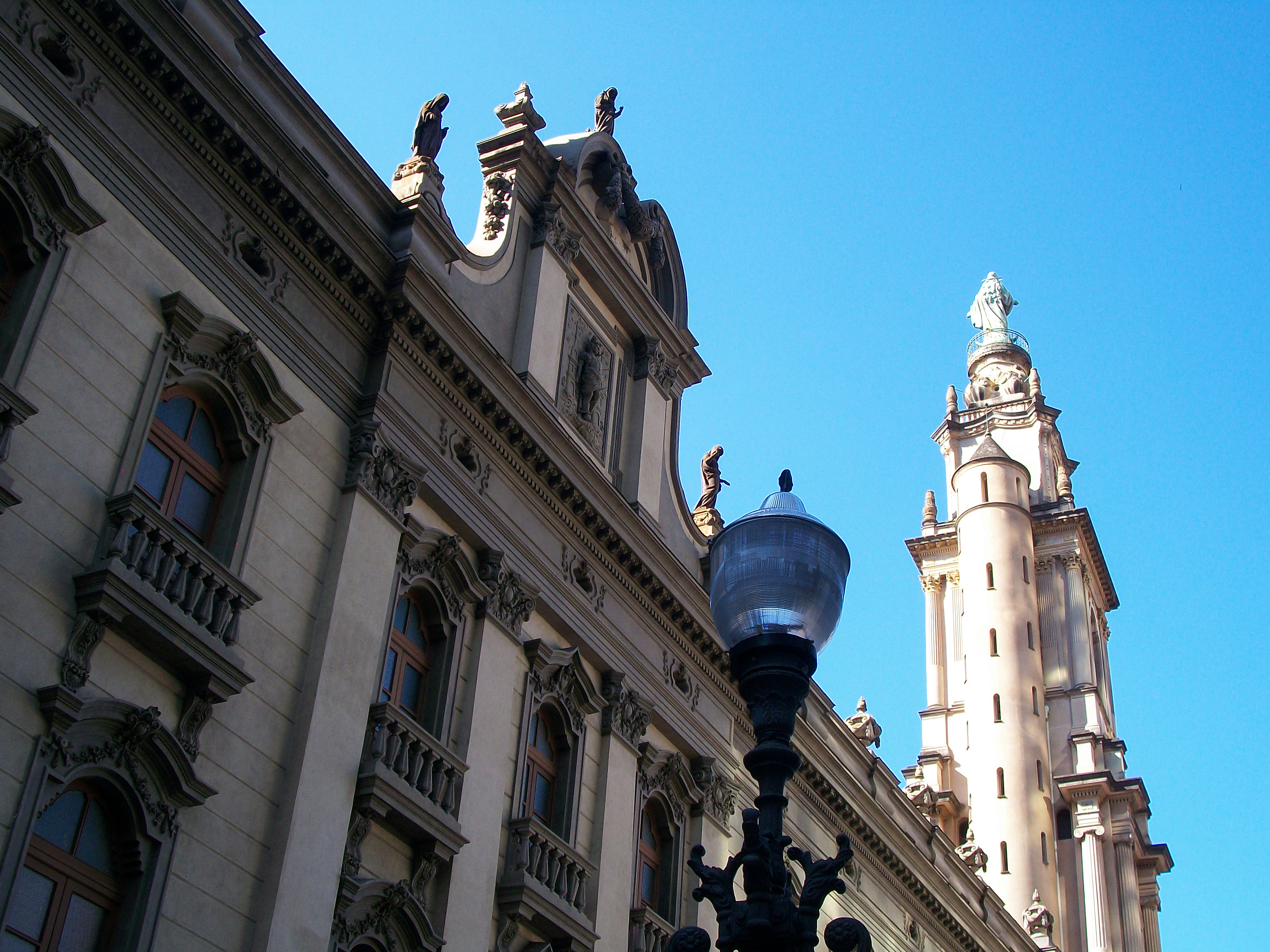
Rear view of the former Imperial Chapel

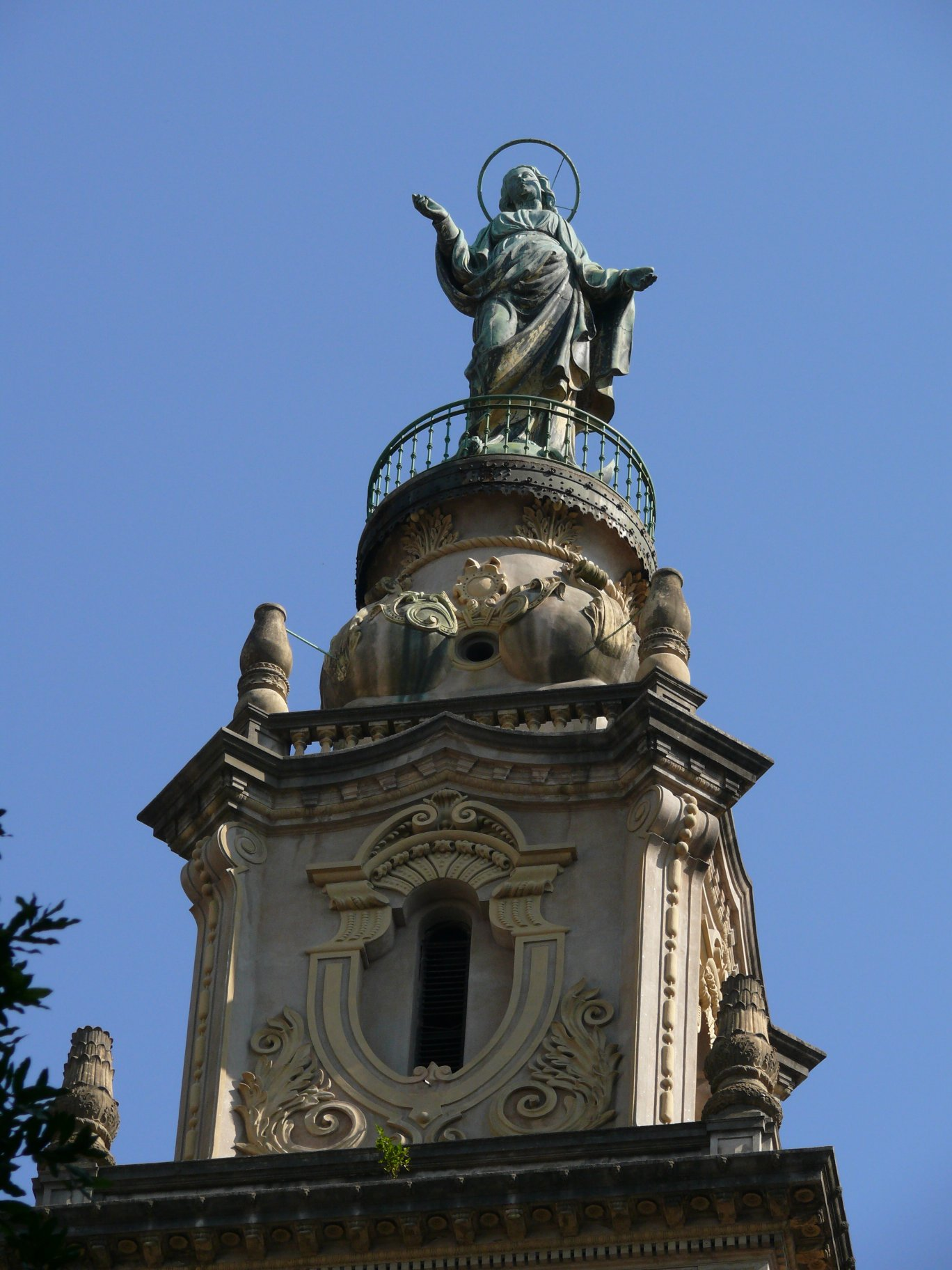
Statue of Our Lady of Mount Carmel

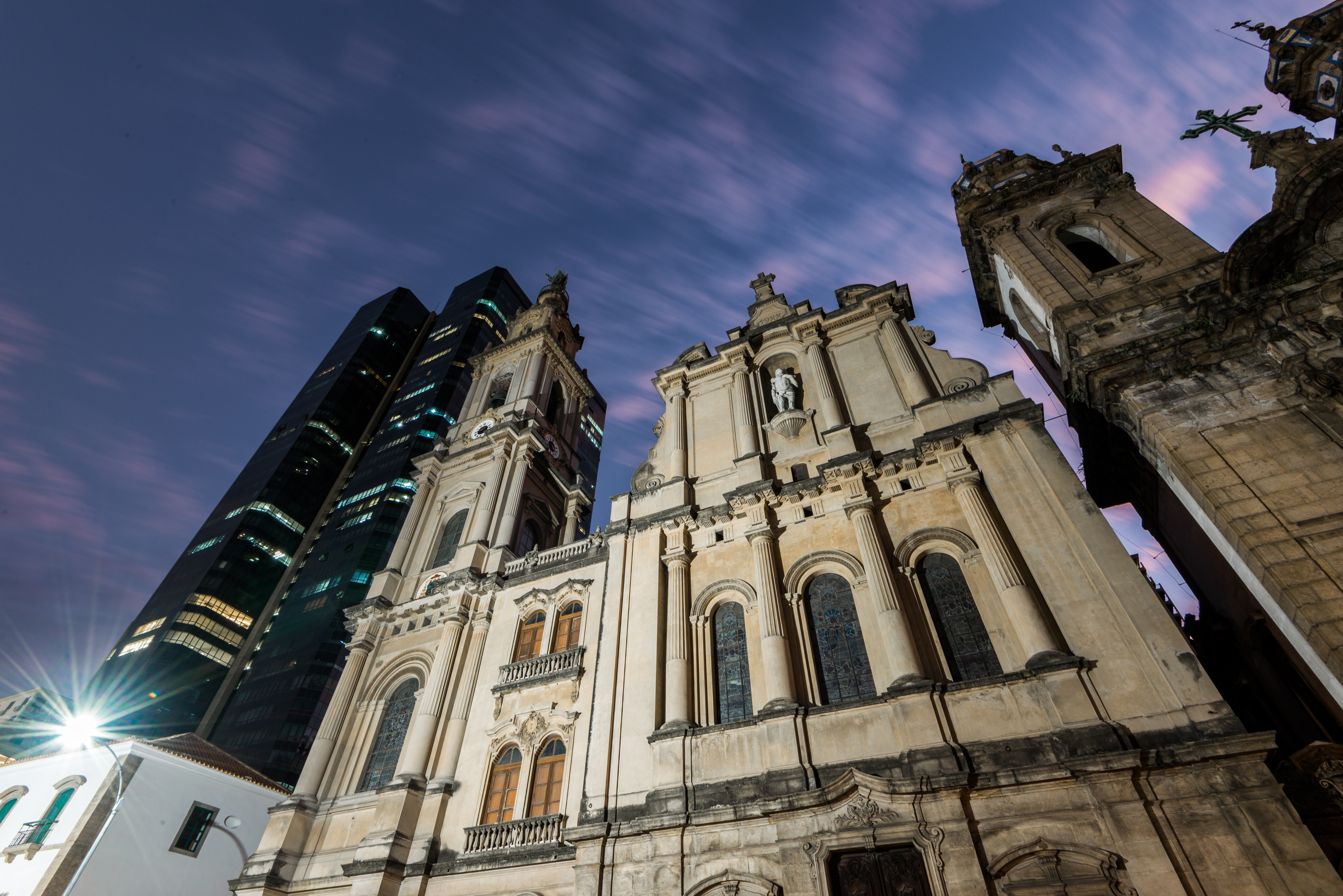
Facade at dusk

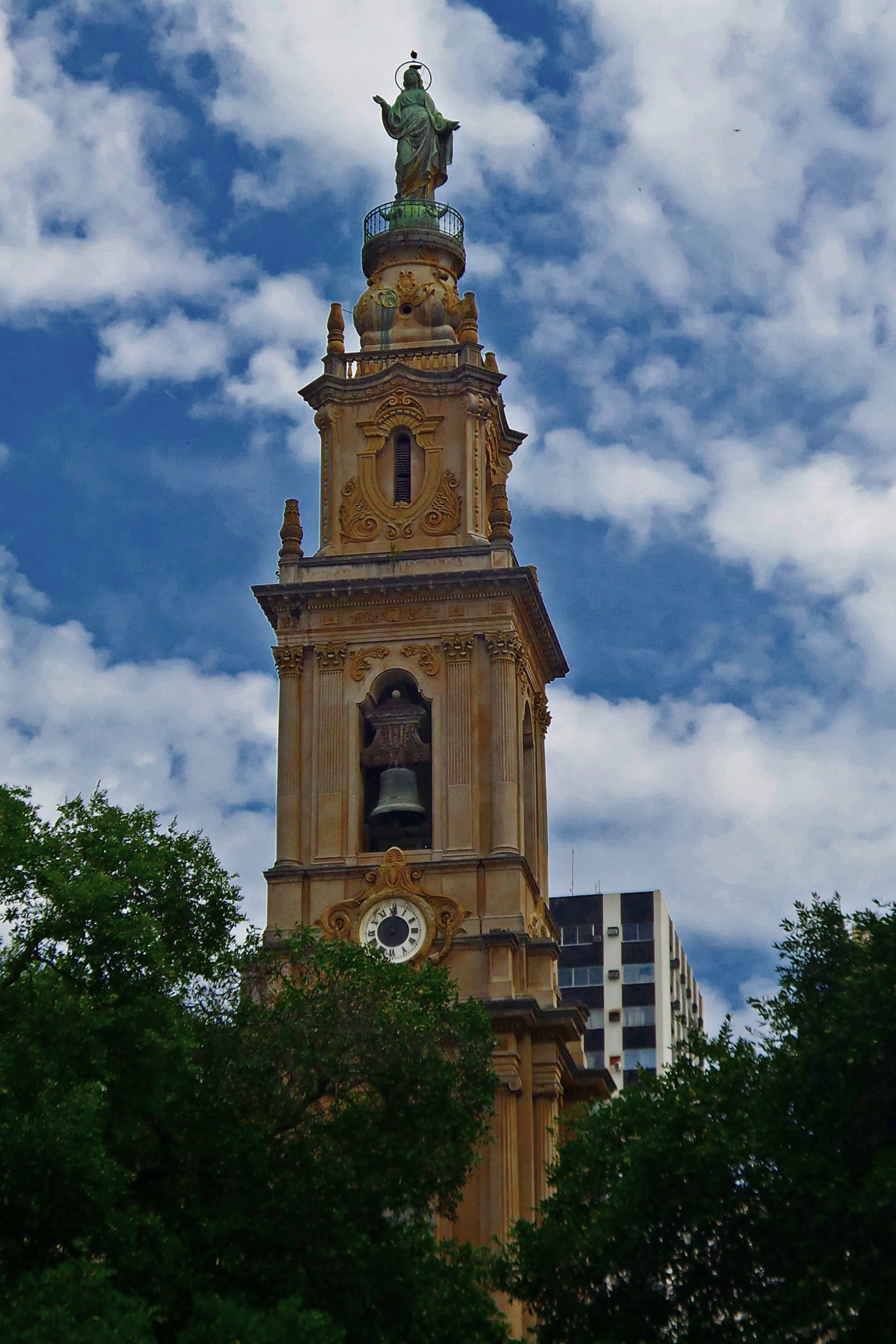
Bell tower

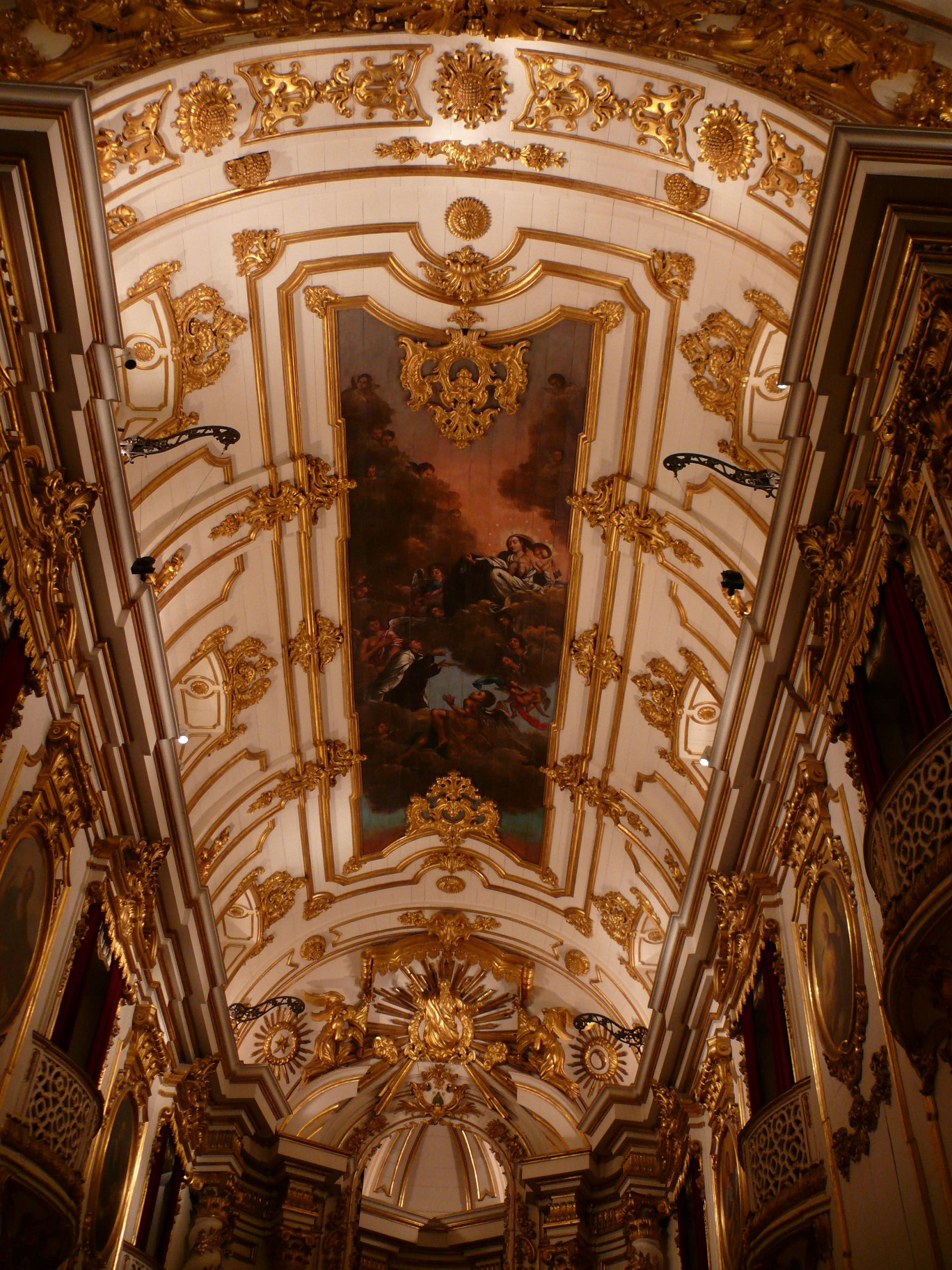
Nave

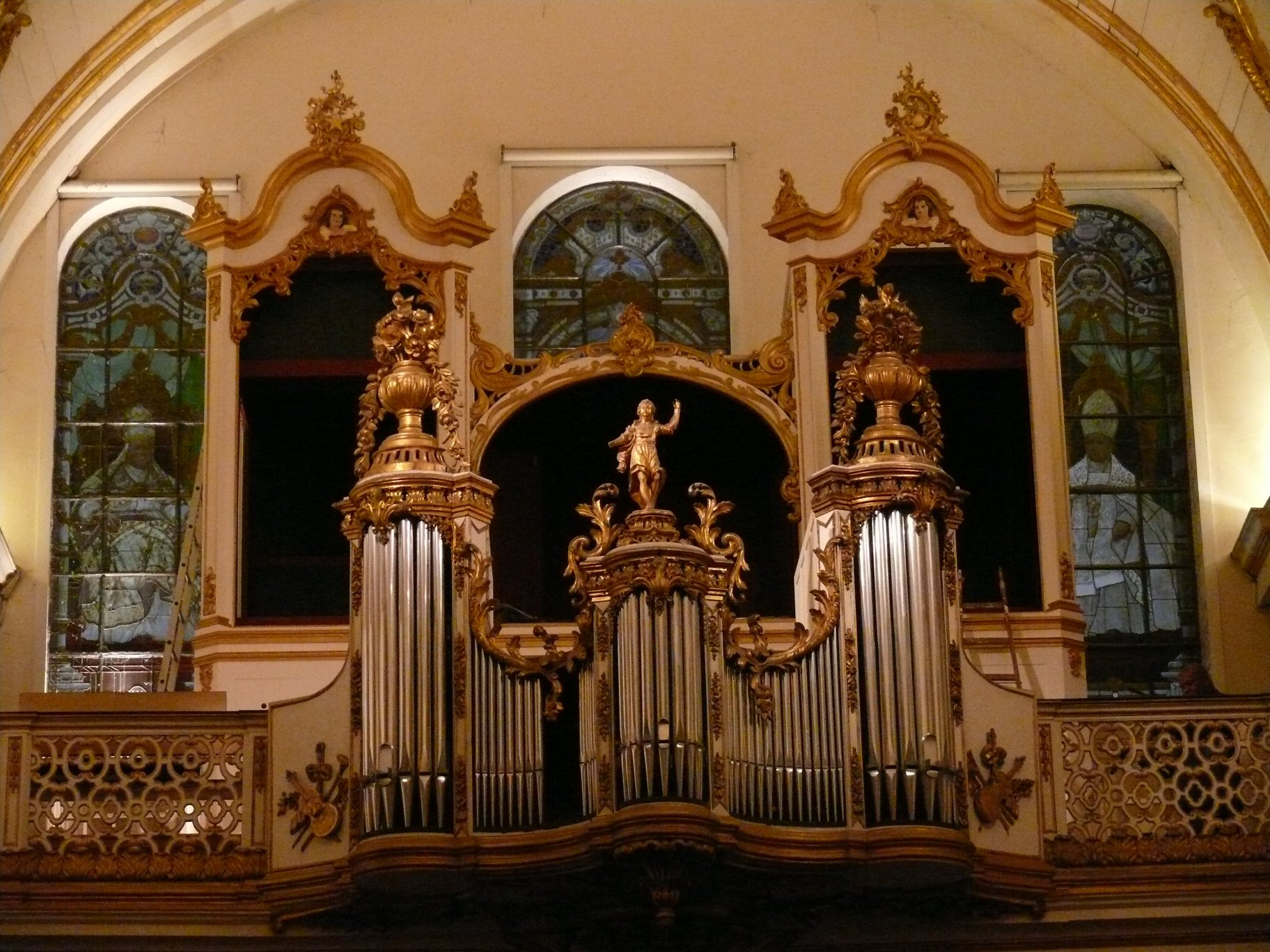
The tribune organ

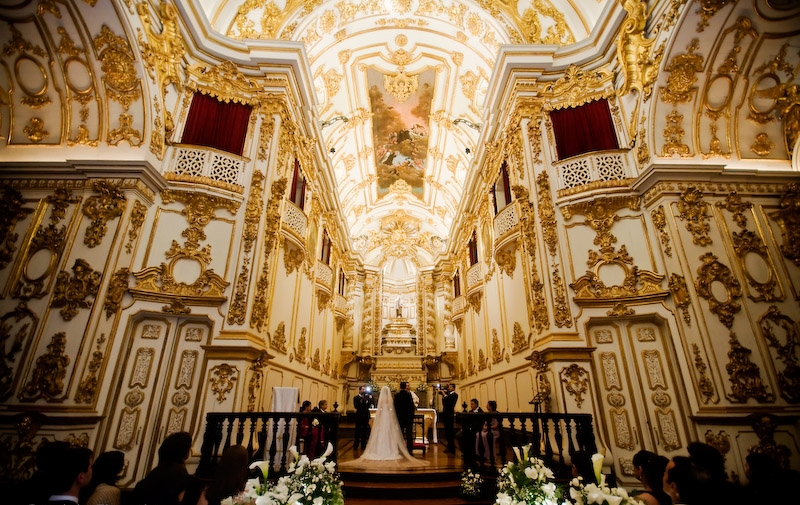
Wedding ceremony in the church
