= José Freire de Oliveira Neto =

Brazilian Roman Catholic bishop

- Bishop of Mossoró
- Church: Catholic Church
- Diocese: Diocese of Mossoró
- In office: 14 March 1984 – 15 June 2004
- Predecessor: Gentil Diniz Barreto
- Successor: Mariano Manzana
- Previous posts: Coadjutor Bishop of Mossoró (1979-1984); Titular Bishop of Illici (1973-1979); Auxiliary Bishop of Mossoró (1973-1979)

Orders
- Ordination: 22 September 1956
- Consecration: 2 June 1974 by Gentil Diniz Barreto

Personal details
- Born: 9 March 1928 Apodi, Rio Grande do Norte, Brazil
- Died: 10 January 2012 (aged 83)

José Freire de Olivera Neto (9 March 1928 – 10 January 2012) was a Brazilian Roman Catholic bishop of the Diocese of Mossoró, Brazil.

Ordained to the priesthood in 1956, Freire de Olivera Neto became bishop in 1973 retiring in 2004.
