= Diocese of São José dos Campos =

Catholic ecclesiastical territory

Diocese of São José dos Campos Dioecesis Sancti Iosephi in Brasilia Diocese de São José dos Campos

Catholic

Location
- Country: Brazil
- Ecclesiastical province: Aparecida

Statistics
- Area: 3,271 km^{2} (1,263 sq mi)
- Population: Total; Catholics: (as of 2010); 872,654; 680,670 (78%)

Information
- Sui iuris church: Latin Church
- Rite: Roman Rite
- Established: 30 January 1981 (45 years ago)
- Cathedral: Cathedral of St Dismas in São José dos Campos

Current leadership
- Pope: Leo XIV
- Bishop: José Valmor César Teixeira

Map
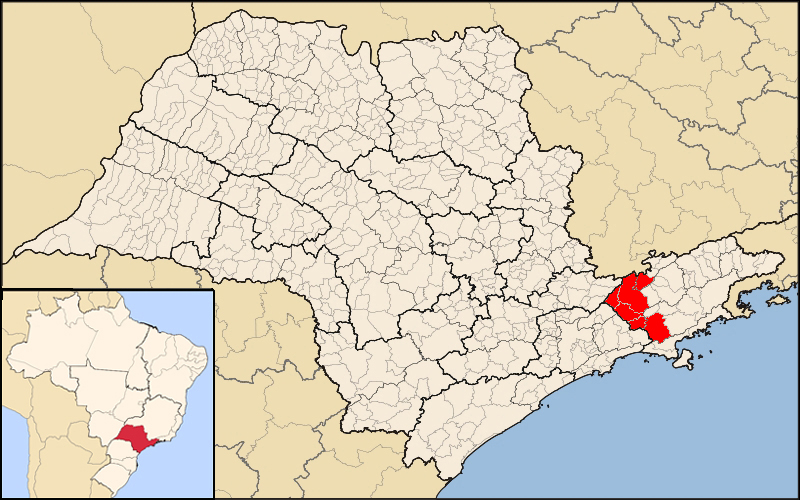

Website
- www.diocese-sjc.org.br

The Roman Catholic Diocese of São José dos Campos (Latin: Dioecesis Sancti Iosephi in Brasilia) is a diocese located in the city of São José dos Campos, in the ecclesiastical province of Aparecida in Brazil.

== History ==
- January 30, 1981: Established as Diocese of São José dos Campos from the Diocese of Mogi das Cruzes and Diocese of Taubaté

== Bishops ==
- Bishops of São José dos Campos (Latin Church)
  - Bishop Eusébio Oscar Scheid, S.C.I. Dehonians (1981.02.11 – 1991.01.23), appointed Archbishop of Florianópolis, Santa Catarina (Cardinal in 2003)
  - Bishop José Nelson Westrupp, S.C.I. (1991.05.11 – 2003.10.01), appointed Bishop of Santo André, São Paulo
  - Bishop Moacir Silva (2004.10.20 – 2013.04.24), appointed Archbishop of Ribeirão Preto by Pope Francis
  - Bishop José Valmor César Teixeira, S.D.B. (2014.03.20 - present)

=== Other priests of this diocese who became bishops ===
- Dimas Lara Barbosa was appointed Auxiliary Bishop of São Sebastião do Rio de Janeiro in 2003
