= Military Ordinariate of Brazil =

Catholic ecclesiastical jurisdiction

Military Ordinariate of Brazil Ordinariatus Militaris Brasilia Ordinariado Militar do Brasil
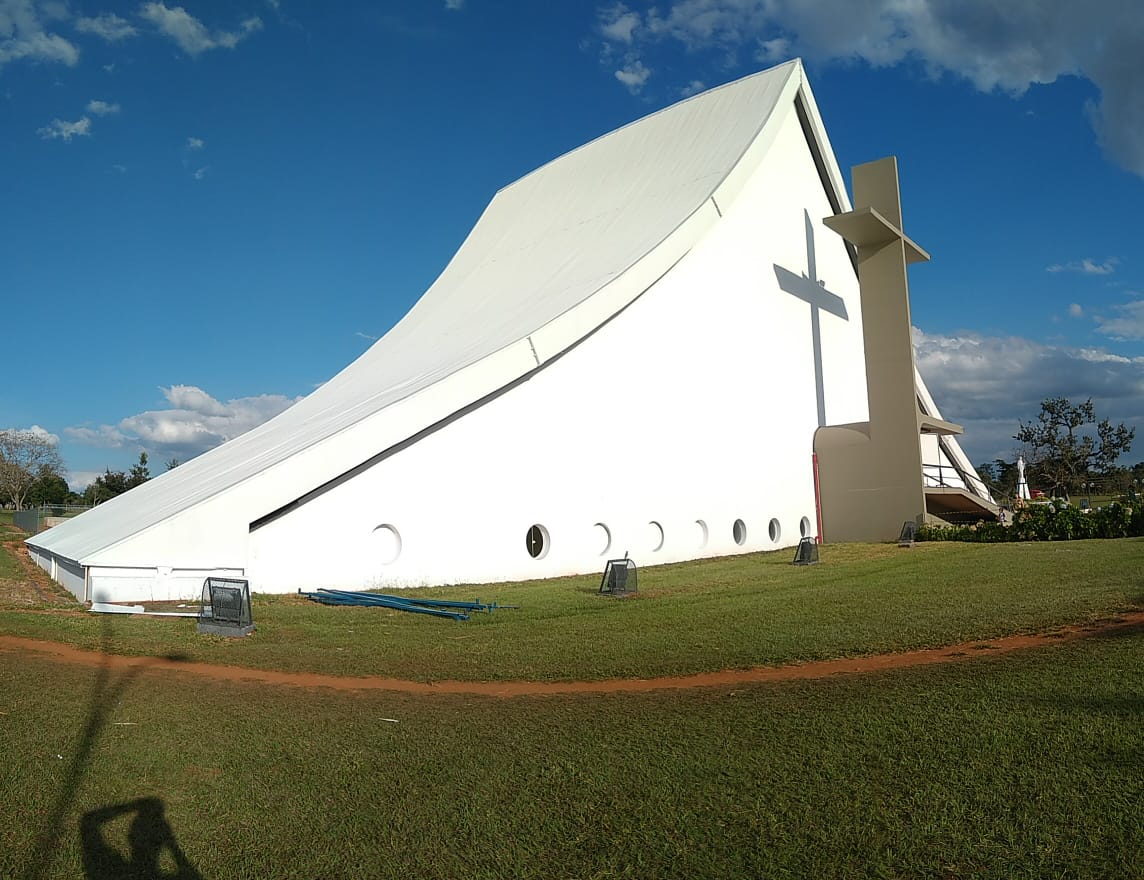

- Coat of arms

Location
- Country: Brazil
- Ecclesiastical province: Immediately exempt to the Holy See

Information
- Denomination: Catholic Church
- Sui iuris church: Latin Church
- Rite: Roman Rite
- Established: 6 November 1950 (75 years ago)
- Cathedral: Military Cathedral of St. Mary Queen of Peace, Brasília
- Patron saint: Ignatius of Loyola

Current leadership
- Pope: Leo XIV
- Archbishop: Marcony Vinícius Ferreira
- Auxiliary Bishops: Fabrício do Prado Nunes
- Bishops emeritus: Osvino José Both; Fernando José Monteiro Guimarães, C.SS.R.

Website
- https://arquidiocesemilitar.org.br/

The Military Ordinariate of Brazil (Portuguese: Ordinariado Militar do Brasil) is a Latin Church military ordinariate of the Catholic Church. Immediately exempt to the Holy See, it provides pastoral care to Catholics serving in the Brazilian Armed Forces and their families.

== History ==
It was created as a military vicariate on 6 November 1950, with the first military vicar appointment on the same day. It was elevated to a military ordinariate on 21 July 1986. The military ordinary's seat is located at the Military Cathedral of Saint Mary of the Military Queen of Peace (Catedral Militar Santa Maria dos Militares Rainha da Paz) in the city of Brasília.

== Bishops ==
=== Ordinaries ===
Military vicars

- Jaime de Barros Câmara (appointed 6 November 1950 – resigned 9 November 1963)
- Jose Newton de Almeida Baptista (appointed 9 November 1963 – became military ordinary 21 July 1986)

Military ordinaries

- Jose Newton de Almeida Baptista (appointed 21 July 1986 – retired 31 October 1990)
- Geraldo do Espírito Santo Ávila (appointed 31 October 1990 – died 14 November 2005)
- Osvino José Both (appointed 7 June 2006 – retired 6 August 2014)
- Fernando José Monteiro Guimarães, C.SS.R. (appointed 6 August 2014 – retired 12 March 2022)
- Marcony Vinícius Ferreira (appointed 12 March 2022 – incumbent)

=== Auxiliary bishops ===
- Alberto Trevisan, S.A.C. (1964–1966), appointed auxiliary bishop of São Sebastião do Rio de Janeiro
- Augustinho Petry (2000–2007), appointed coadjutor bishop of Rio do Sul, Santa Catarina
- José Francisco Falcão de Barros (2011–?)
- Fabrício do Prado Nunes (2016–present), titular bishop of Tadamata
