= Rio de Janeiro Cathedral =

Seat of the Catholic Archdiocese of Rio de Janeiro

Metropolitan Cathedral of Saint Sebastian
- Portuguese: Catedral Metropolitana de São Sebastião
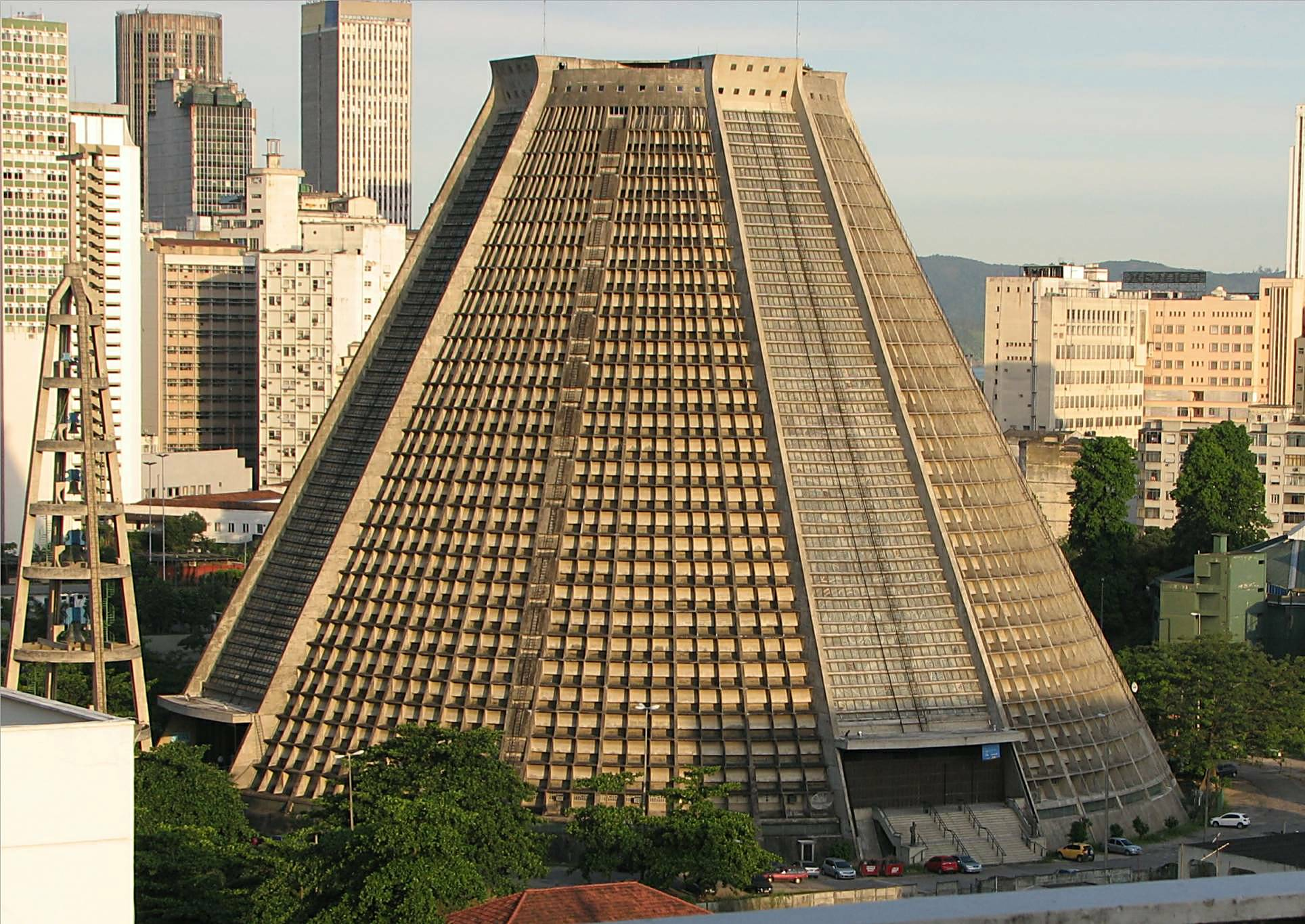
- Rio de Janeiro Cathedral exterior

Religion
- Affiliation: Catholic Church
- Diocese: Archdiocese of Rio de Janeiro
- Ecclesiastical or organisational status: Cathedral

Location
- Location: Rio de Janeiro, Brazil
- Interactive map of Metropolitan Cathedral of Saint Sebastian
- Coordinates: 22°54′39″S 43°10′51″W

Architecture
- Architect: Edgar Fonseca
- Type: Church
- Style: Modernist
- Groundbreaking: 1964
- Completed: 1979
- Capacity: 20,000

The Metropolitan Cathedral of Saint Sebastian (Portuguese: Catedral Metropolitana de São Sebastião), better known as the Metropolitan Cathedral of Rio de Janeiro (Catedral Metropolitana do Rio de Janeiro) or as the Cathedral of St. Sebastian of Rio de Janeiro (Catedral de São Sebastião do Rio de Janeiro), is a cathedral of the Catholic Church and the seat of the Archdiocese of Rio de Janeiro. The cathedral is home to the cathedra of the Archbishops of the city of Rio de Janeiro, Brazil. The church is dedicated to Saint Sebastian, the patron saint of Rio de Janeiro.

== Architecture ==
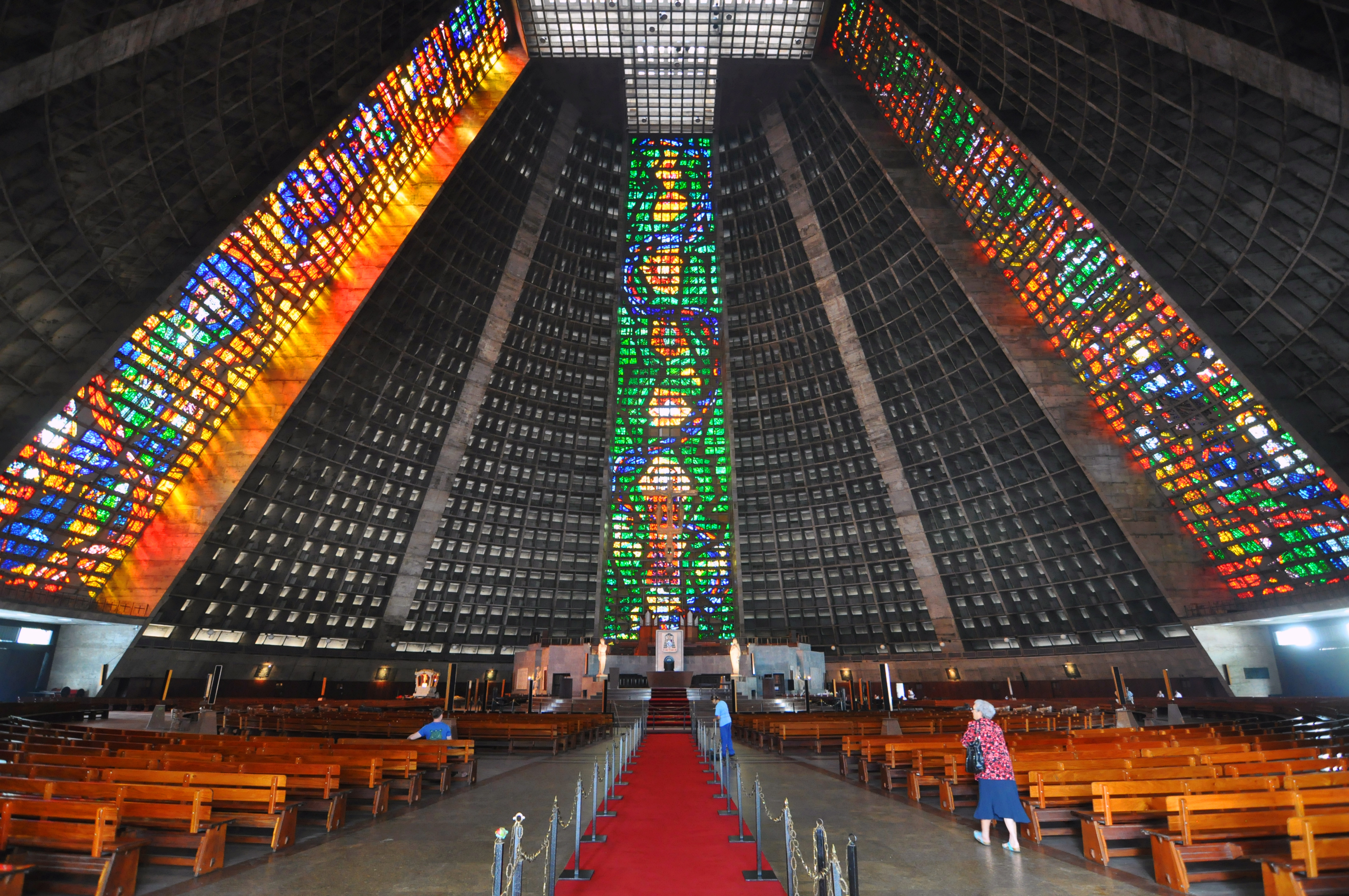
Inside the Cathedral

The cathedral was designed by Edgar de Oliveira da Fonseca in a modern style based on Mayan architectural style of pyramids. The current cathedral was built between 1964 and 1979 and replaced as seat of the Archdiocese a series of churches that had served as cathedrals since 1676, the most recent and notable of those being the Church of Our Lady of Mount Carmel of the Ancient See, now known as the Old Cathedral, built in the 18th century, and that had been declared Rio's cathedral in the early 19th century.

The New Cathedral, as it is sometimes called, is located in the center of the city. Conical in form and with a 96 metres (315 ft) internal diameter — 106 metres of external diameter — and an overall height of 75 metres (246 ft). Inside, the area measures 8,000 square meters and sufficient 5,000 seats (it has a standing-room capacity of 20,000 people).

The cathedral's four rectilinear stained glass windows soar 64 metres (210 ft) from floor to ceiling.

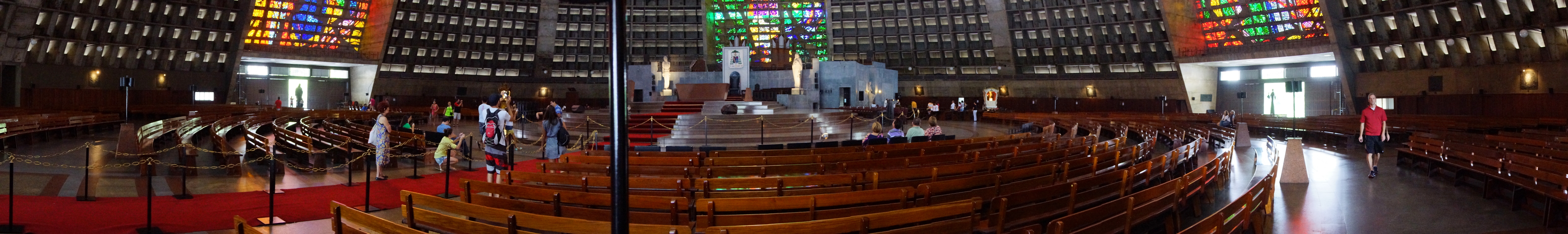
Interior panorama of the Cathedral São Sebastião

== See also ==
- Old Cathedral of Rio de Janeiro
