= List of Brazilian cardinals =

List of cardinals from Brazil

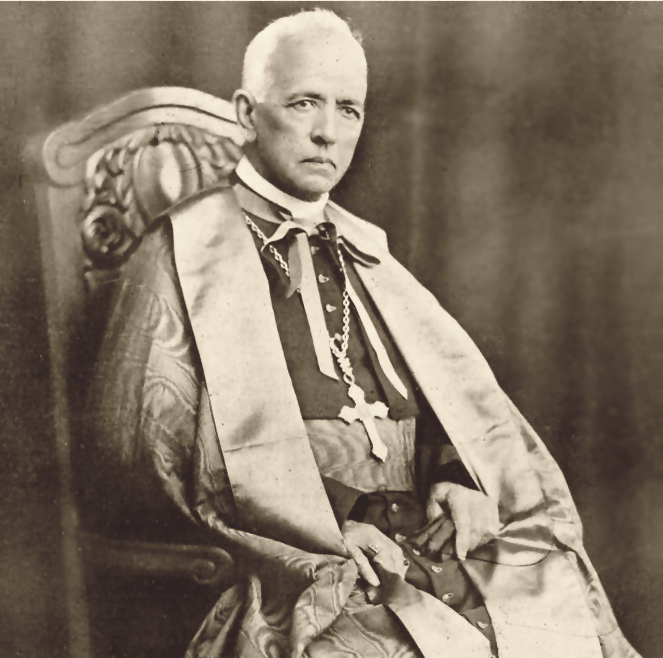
Joaquim Arcoverde de Albuquerque Cavalcanti, from Pernambuco, was the first bishop to be elevated to the title and dignity of cardinal in Latin America.

The following is a list of Brazilian cardinals in the Roman Catholic Church ordered by years of consistory which elevated them to cardinalcy.

Of the twenty-five Brazilian cardinals, six are from Santa Catarina, five from Minas Gerais, four from Rio Grande do Sul, four from São Paulo, two from Pernambuco, one from Alagoas, one from Ceará, one from Rio Grande do Norte and one from Rio de Janeiro. By region, ten are from the Southeast, ten from the South and five from the Northeast.

#	Elevated to cardinalate	Pope	Image	Name	Order	Lifespan	Mission	Coat of Arms
1	1905	Pius X		Joaquim Arcoverde de Albuquerque Cavalcanti	—N/a	1850 — 1930	Archdiocese of Rio de Janeiro	
2	1930	Pius XI		Sebastião Leme da Silveira Cintra	—N/a	1882 — 1942	Archdiocese of Rio de Janeiro	
3	1946	Pius XII		Carlos Carmelo de Vasconcelos Motta	—N/a	1890 — 1982	Archdiocese of São Paulo; Archdiocese of Aparecida	
4	1946	Pius XII		Jaime de Barros Câmara	—N/a	1894 — 1971	Archdiocese of Rio de Janeiro	
5	1953	Pius XII		Augusto Álvaro da Silva	—N/a	1876 — 1968	Archdiocese of Salvador	
6	1965	Paul VI		Agnelo Rossi	—N/a	1913 — 1995	Archdiocese of São Paulo	
7	1969	Paul VI		Alfredo Vicente Scherer	—N/a	1903 — 1996	Archdiocese of Porto Alegre	
8	1969	Paul VI		Eugênio de Araújo Sales	—N/a	1920 — 2012	Archdiocese of Salvador	
9	1973	Paul VI		Avelar Brandão Vilela	—N/a	1912 — 1986	Archdiocese of Salvador	
10	1973	Paul VI		Frei Paulo Evaristo Arns	O.F.M.	1921 — 2016	Archdiocese of São Paulo	
11	1976	Paul VI		Frei Aloísio Lorscheider	O.F.M.	1924 — 2007	Archdiocese of Fortaleza; Archdiocese of Aparecida	
12	1988	John Paul II		José Freire Falcão	—N/a	1925 — 2021	Archdiocese of Brasília	
13	1988	John Paul II		Frei Lucas Moreira Neves	O.P.	1925 — 2002	Archdiocese of Salvador	
14	1998	John Paul II		Serafim Fernandes de Araújo	—N/a	1924 — 2019	Archdiocese of Belo Horizonte	
15	2001	John Paul II		Frei Cláudio Hummes	O.F.M.	1934 — 2022	Archdiocese of São Paulo	
16	2001	John Paul II		Geraldo Majella Agnelo	—N/a	1933 — 2023	Archdiocese of Salvador	
17	2003	John Paul II		Eusébio Oscar Scheid	S.C.J.	1932 — 2021	Archdiocese of Rio de Janeiro	
18	2007	Benedict XVI		Odilo Pedro Scherer	—N/a	1949 —	Archdiocese of São Paulo	
19	2010	Benedict XVI		Raymundo Damasceno Assis	—N/a	1937 —	Archdiocese of Aparecida	
20	2012	Benedict XVI		João Braz de Aviz	—N/a	1947 —	Congregação para os Institutos de Vida Consagrada e Sociedades de Vida Apostólica	
21	2014	Francis		Orani João Tempesta	O.Cist	1950 —	Archdiocese of Rio de Janeiro	
22	2016	Francis		Sérgio da Rocha	—N/a	1959 —	Archdiocese of Brasília; Archdiocese of Salvador	
23	2022	Francis		Frei Leonardo Ulrich Steiner	O.F.M.	1950 —	Archdiocese of Manaus	
24	2022	Francis		Paulo Cezar Costa	—N/a	1967 —	Archdiocese of Brasília	
25	2024	Francis		Jaime Spengler	O.F.M.	1960 —	Archdiocese of Porto Alegre	
