= Cathédrale du Sacré-Cœur =

Cathédrale du Sacré-Cœur may refer to any of these cathedrals:

== Africa ==
- Cathédrale du Sacré-Cœur d'Alger, Algeria
- Cathédrale du Sacré-Cœur d'Oran, Algeria
- Cathédrale du Sacré-Cœur de Moundou, Chad
- Cathédrale du Sacré-Cœur de Casablanca, Morocco
- Cathédrale du Sacré-Cœur de Bamako, Mali
- Cathédrale du Sacré-Cœur de Brazzaville, Republic of Congo
- Cathédrale du Sacré-Cœur de Lomé, Togo

== Asia ==
- Cathédrale du Sacré-Cœur de Buôn Ma Thuột, Vietnam

== Europe ==
- Sacré-Cœur de Paris, France

== Oceania ==
- Cathédrale du Sacré-Cœur de Port Vila, Vanuatu

== See also ==
- Sacred Heart Cathedral (disambiguation)
