= Algiza =

Ancient city

Algiza is a former ancient city (under the name Argiza) and bishopric in Asia Minor, now a Latin Catholic titular see.

Its modern location is Baliapasakov in Asian Turkey.

== History ==
Algiza was important enough in the Late Roman province of Asia Prima to be a suffragan of its capital Ephesus's Metropolitan Archbishop, but faded.

=== Titular see ===
The diocese was nominally restored as a Latin Catholic titular bishopric, first under the name Argiza, since 1929 renamed Algiza.

It is vacant, having had the following 20th-century incumbents, of the lowest (episcopal) rank except the last of archiepiscopal (intermediary) rank :

- Fiorenzo Umberto Tessiatore (戴夏德), Friars Minor (O.F.M.) (1928.05.18 – 1932.04.10)
- Carlos Carmelo de Vasconcelos Motta (1932.07.29 – 1935.12.19) as Auxiliary Bishop of Diamantina (Brazil) (1932.07.29 – 1935.12.19), later Metropolitan Archbishop of São Luís do Maranhão (Brazil) (1935.12.19 – 1944.08.13), Metropolitan Archbishop of São Paulo (Brazil) (1944.08.13 – 1964.04.18), created Cardinal-Priest of S. Pancrazio (1946.02.22 – 1982.09.18), President of National Conference of Bishops of Brazil (1952 – 1958), Apostolic Administrator of Aparecida (Brazil) (1958.04.19 – 1964.04.18), succeeding as Metropolitan Archbishop of Aparecida (1964.04.18 – 1982.09.18), Apostolic Administrator of Lorena (Brazil) (1970 – 1971.11.03), Protopriest of Sacred College of Cardinals (1977.08.02 – 1982.09.18)
- Auguste-Maurice Clément (1936.03.02 – 1939.03.03)
- Ignacio de Alba y Hernández (1939.04.29 – 1949.06.30)
- John Patrick Kavanagh (1949.07.14 – 1957.12.26)
- Titular Archbishop Mario Brini (1961.10.14 – death 1995.12.09), as papal diplomat: Apostolic Delegate to Indochina (1959 – 1962), Apostolic Internuncio to United Arab Republic (1962 – 1965), Secretary of Sacred Congregation for the Oriental Churches (1965 – 1982)

== Source and External links ==
- GCatholic, with titular incumbent biography links
