= Sacred Heart Cathedral, Changwon =

Catholic church in Changwon, South Korea

Sacred Heart Cathedral
- 양덕동성당
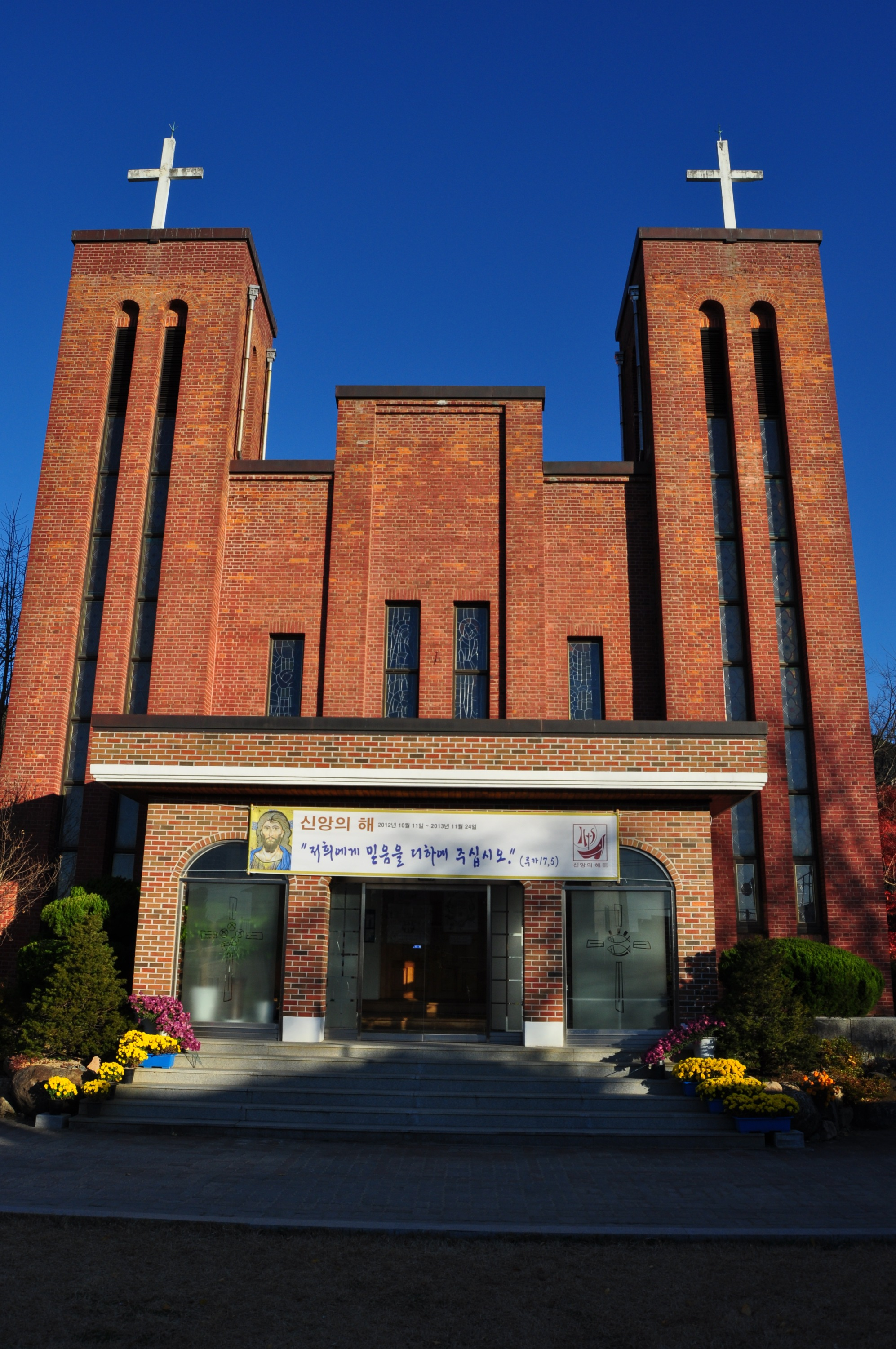
- Sacred Heart Cathedral
- Location: Changwon
- Country: South Korea
- Denomination: Roman Catholic Church

The Sacred Heart Cathedral (Korean: 양덕동성당) also called Yangdok-dong Cathedral of the Sacred Heart is a religious building that is affiliated with the Catholic Church and is located in the city of Changwon in South Gyeongsang Province, in the South part of the Asian country of South Korea.

The colored brick clad building is adorned with 2 two identical towers topped by crosses. The temple follows the Roman or Latin rite and is the principal church of the Diocese of Masan (Dioecesis Masanensis; 마산 교구) that was created by Pope Paul VI in 1966 by bull "siquidem catholicae".

The church is under the pastoral responsibility of the Bishop Constantine Bae Ki-hyen.

== See also ==
- Roman Catholicism in South Korea
- Sacred Heart Cathedral (disambiguation)
