= Antônio Afonso de Miranda =

Brazilian prelate (1920–2021)

The Right Reverend Antônio Afonso de Miranda, S.D.N.
- Bishop of Diocese of Taubaté Emeritus
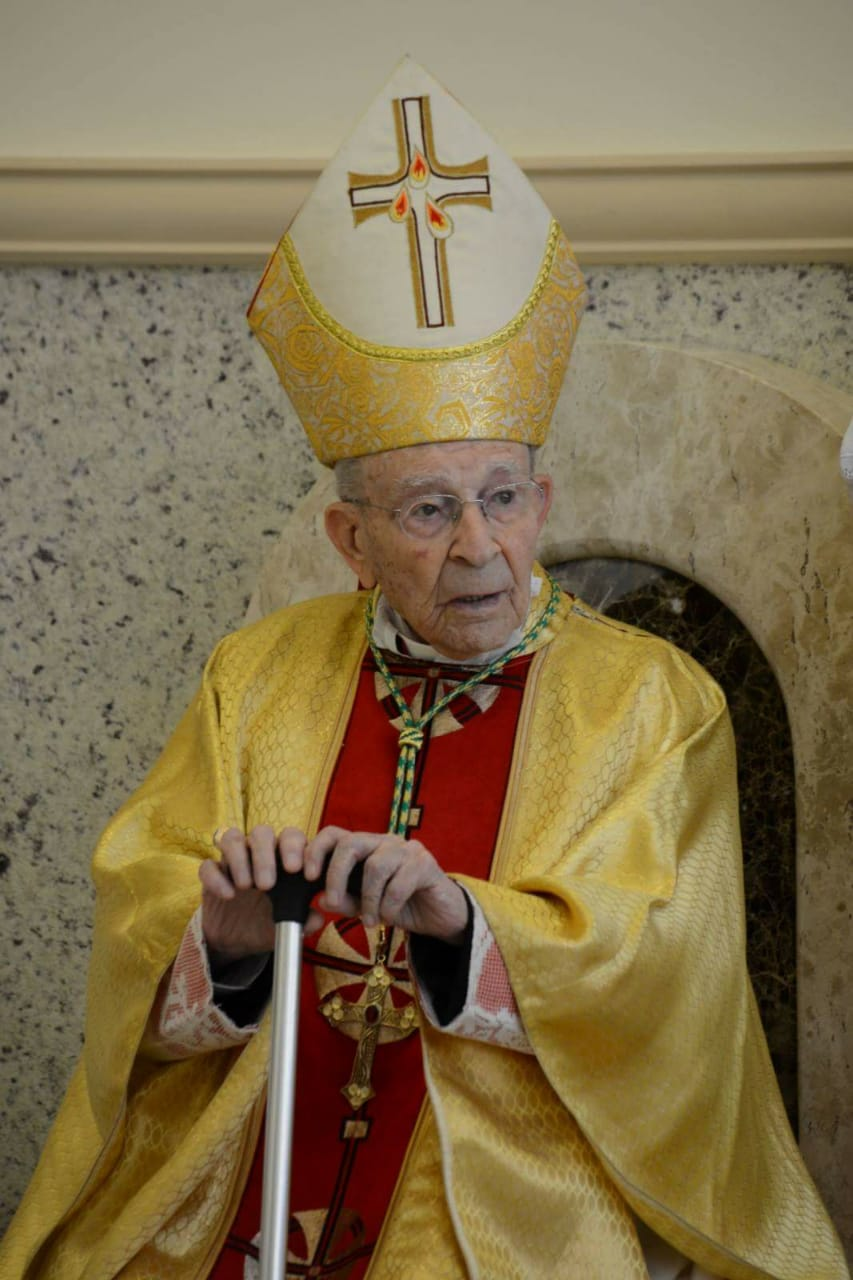
- Church: Roman Catholic Church
- See: Diocese of Taubaté
- In office: 1981–1996
- Predecessor: José Antônio do Couto, S.C.I.
- Successor: Carmo João Rhoden, S.C.J.

Orders
- Ordination: 1 November 1945

Personal details
- Born: 14 April 1920 Cipotânea, Minas Gerais, Brazil
- Died: 11 October 2021 (aged 101) Cipotânea, Minas Gerais, Brazil
- Motto: De uno pane

Antônio Afonso de Miranda (14 April 1920 – 11 October 2021) was a Brazilian prelate of the Roman Catholic Church.

== Biography ==
Afonso de Miranda was born in Cipotânea, Brazil in April 1920. He was ordained a priest on 1 November 1945 in the Congregation of the Sacred Heart of Jesus. He was appointed Bishop of the Diocese of Lorena on 3 November 1971 and was consecrated on 27 December. He was appointed Coadjutor Bishop of the Diocese of Campanha on 11 July 1977. Afonso de Miranda's final appointment was to the Diocese of Taubaté on 6 August 1981, where he served until his retirement on 22 May 1996.

He died on 11 October 2021, at the age of 101.

== See also ==
- Roman Catholic Diocese of Taubaté
- Roman Catholic Diocese of Campanha
- Roman Catholic Diocese of Lorena
- Institute of Consecrated Life
