= Argesis =

Argesis may refer to:

- Argiza, a town in ancient Mysia, Anatolia
- Argeș River, in Romania
