= Carlos Carmelo Vasconcellos Motta =

Brazilian Catholic Cardinal

His Eminence Carlos Carmelo de Vasconcellos Motta
- Archbishop of Aparecida
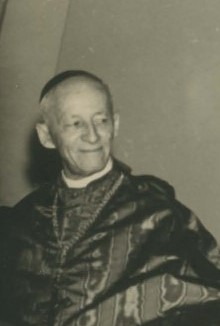
- Church: Roman Catholic Church
- Archdiocese: Aparecida
- See: Aparecida
- Appointed: 18 April 1964
- Term ended: 18 September 1982
- Successor: Geraldo María de Morais Penido
- Other posts: Cardinal-Priest of San Pancrazio (1946–1982); Protopriest (1977–1982)
- Previous posts: Titular Bishop of Algiza (1932–1935); Auxiliary Bishop of Diamantina (1932–1935); Archbishop of São Luís do Maranhão (1935–1944); Apostolic Administrator of Pinheiro (1940–1944); Archbishop of São Paulo (1944–1964); President of the Brazilian Episcopal Conference (1952–1958); Apostolic Administrator of Aparecida (1958–1964); Apostolic Administrator of Lorena (1970–1971)

Orders
- Ordination: 29 June 1918 by Silvério Gomes Pimenta
- Consecration: 30 October 1932 by Antônio dos Santos Cabral
- Created cardinal: 18 February 1946 by Pope Pius XII
- Rank: Cardinal-Priest

Personal details
- Born: Carlos Carmelo de Vasconcellos Motta; 16 July 1890 Bom Jesus do Amparo, Mariana, Brazil
- Died: September 18, 1982 (aged 92) Santa Casa de Misericórdia, Aparecida, Brazil
- Buried: Basilica of Our Lady of Aparecida
- Parents: João de Vasconcellos Teixeira da Motta; Francisca Josina dos Santos Motta
- Motto: In sinu Jesu
- Coat of arms

Styles of Carlos Carmelo Vasconcellos Motta
- Reference style: His Eminence
- Spoken style: Your Eminence
- Informal style: Cardinal
- See: São Paulo; Aparecida

Carlos Carmelo Vasconcellos Motta (16 July 1890 – 18 September 1982) was a long-serving cardinal. Until Eugênio de Araújo Sales surpassed him in 2005, he was the longest-serving Brazilian cardinal, and during his cardinalate the Church in Brazil underwent tremendous expansion, involving the development of many new movements that were to develop after he had largely disappeared from the scene.

== Biography ==
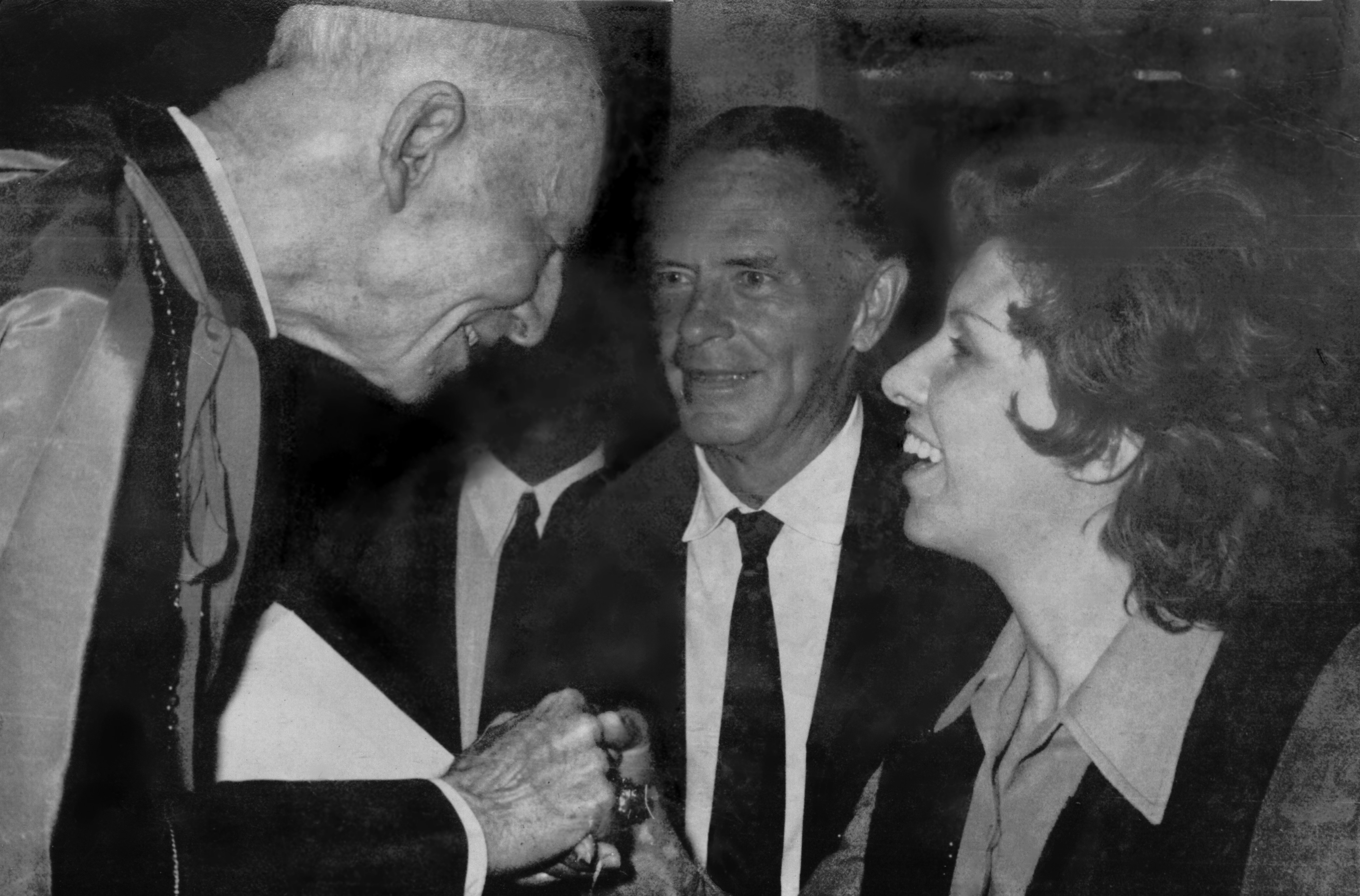
D. Vasconcellos Motta, in 1971.

Originally from a small village in the state of Minas Gerais, the future Cardinal gained his education in the local seminary in the city of Mariana. He was ordained in 1918, and spent much of the next fifteen years in the state capital of Belo Horizonte as a seminary rector. He became a bishop in 1932, but only of a titular see. His first proper appointment as a diocesan bishop was to the Archdiocese of São Luis in the remote state of Maranhão three years later, but Motta attracted no wider attention until he was promoted to Brazil's most prestigious see of São Paulo in 1944.

With his appointment as a cardinal by Pope Pius XII in the consistory of 18 February 1946, Motta became effectively the leader of the Church in Brazil for the next twenty years or so until a new generation of leaders (Sales, Arns, Lorscheider) emerged. In this role, Cardinal Motta was faced with the difficult task of what policy to take when confronted with widespread anguish at the great social inequality so characteristic of Brazil. In the 1950s, he became the first archbishop in the Catholic Church to regularly hold episcopal synods – something that became regular practice after Vatican II. Amongst his closest pupils was the latterly famous Hélder Câmara. On the other side, Motta had to contend with the ultra-right-wing group Tradition, Family and Property, which aimed to win him over with a still-extant letter in 1956. Regarded as a quiet man who did not like publicity, Motta's reply has characteristically not survived.

Motta was the effective leader of the First General Conference of South American Bishops in 1955. Motta attended the sessions of the Second Vatican Council and was transferred to the see of Aparecida in 1964. His role in the Church declined significantly after this, however, as new generations of Church leaders contended with the problems of Brazil's 1964 military coup.

He participated in the conclaves of 1958 and 1963, but lost his right to participate by being older than eighty in 1971. When he died in 1982, Motta had been a cardinal longer than anyone else living. He was the third-last surviving cardinal elevated by Pope Pius XII behind Paul-Émile Léger and Giuseppe Siri, and the last surviving cardinal elevated in the 1946 consistory.

Catholic Church titles
Preceded by Manuel Gonçalves Cerejeira	Cardinal Protopriest; 2 Agosto 1977 – 18 September 1982	Succeeded by Giuseppe Siri
Records
Preceded by Antonio Caggiano	Oldest living Member of the Sacred College; 23 October 1979 – 14 September 1982	Succeeded by Pietro Parente
