= Aloísio Roque Oppermann =

Brazilian Roman Catholic bishop

Aloísio Roque Oppermann S.C.I.
- Archbishop of Uberaba
- Church: Catholic Church
- Archdiocese: Archdiocese of Uberaba
- In office: 28 February 1996 – 7 March 2012
- Predecessor: Benedito de Ulhôa Vieira
- Successor: Paulo Mendes Peixoto
- Previous posts: Bishop of Campanha (1991-1996); Coadjutor Bishop of Campanha (1988-1991); Bishop of Ituiutaba (1983-1988)

Orders
- Ordination: 29 June 1961 by Francisco do Borja Pereira do Amaral
- Consecration: 21 April 1983 by Carlo Furno

Personal details
- Born: 19 June 1936 Montenegro, São Pedro do Rio Grande do Sul, Brazil
- Died: 26 April 2014 (aged 77)

Aloísio Roque Oppermann (19 June 1936 – 26 April 2014) was a Roman Catholic bishop.

Ordained to the priesthood in 1961, he was named bishop of the Diocese of Ituitaba, Brazil, in 1983 and then coadjutor bishop of Campanha in 1988 succeeding as diocesan bishop in 1991. In 1996, Oppermann was named Archbishop of Uberaba and retired in 2012.
