= Diocese of Campanha =

Catholic ecclesiastical territory

Coordinates: 21.8348°S 45.3997°W

Diocese of Campanha Dioecesis Campaniensis in Brasilia

Catholic
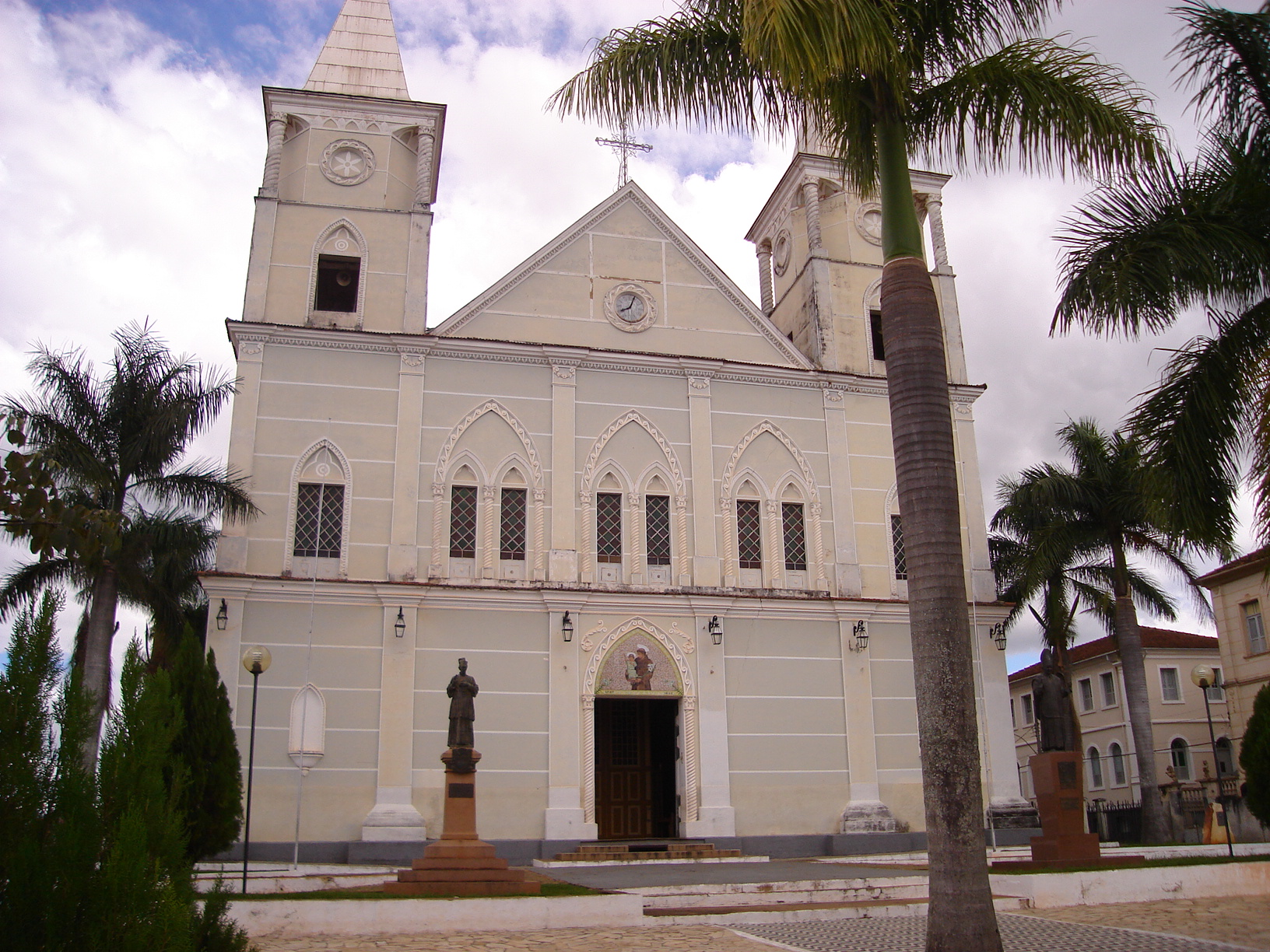
- Saint Anthony Cathedral

Location
- Country: Brazil
- Ecclesiastical province: Pouso Alegre

Statistics
- Area: 15,420 km^{2} (5,950 sq mi)
- Population: Total; Catholics: (as of 2004); 662,483; 647,433 (97.7%)

Information
- Denomination: Catholic Church
- Rite: Latin Rite
- Established: 8 September 1907 (119 years ago)
- Cathedral: Catedral Santo Antônio

Current leadership
- Pope: Leo XIV
- Bishop: Walter Jorge Pinto
- Metropolitan Archbishop: José Luiz Majella Delgado
- Bishops emeritus: Diamantino Prata de Carvalho, O.F.M.

The Roman Catholic Diocese of Campanha (Latin: Dioecesis Campaniensis in Brasilia) is a diocese located in the city of Campanha in the ecclesiastical province of Pouso Alegre in Brazil.

== History ==
- 8 September 1907: Established as Diocese of Campanha from the Diocese of São Paulo

== Special churches ==
- Minor Basilicas:
  - Basílica Nossa Senhora da Conceição, Conceição do Rio Verde, Minas Gerais
  - Basílica Nossa Senhora das Dores, Boa Esperança, Minas Gerais

== Bishops ==
- Bishops of Campanha (Roman rite), in reverse chronological order
  - Bishop Walter Jorge Pinto (2025.11.07 – Present)
  - Bishop Pedro Cunha Cruz (2015.11.25 – 2025.07.02), appointed Bishop of Nova Friburgo
  - Bishop Diamantino Prata de Carvalho, O.F.M. (1998.03.25 – 2015.11.25)
  - Bishop Aloísio Roque Oppermann, S.C.J. (1991.05.15 – 1996.02.28), appointed Archbishop of Uberaba, Minas Gerais
  - Bishop Aloísio Ariovaldo Amaral, C.Ss.R. (1984.04.14 – 1991.05.15)
  - Bishop Othon Motta (1960.05.16 – 1982.01.16)
  - Bishop Inocêncio Engelke, O.F.M. (1935.12.25 – 1960.06.16)
  - Bishop João de Almeida Ferrão (1909.04.29 – 1935.12.25)

=== Coadjutor bishops ===
- Inocêncio Engelke, O.F.M. (1924-1935)
- Othon Motta (1959-1960)
- Antônio Afonso de Miranda, S.D.N. (1977-1981), did not succeed to see; appointed Bishop of Taubaté, São Paulo
- Aloísio Roque Oppermann, S.C.I. (1988-1991)
- Pedro Cunha Cruz (2015)

=== Other priests of this diocese who became bishops ===
- José Costa Campos, appointed Bishop of Valença, Rio de Janeiro in 1960
- Tomé Ferreira da Silva, appointed Auxiliary Bishop of São Paulo in 2005
