= Joaquim Cavalcanti =

Brazilian Catholic cardinal

His Eminence Joaquim Cavalcanti
- Cardinal, Archbishop of Rio de Janeiro
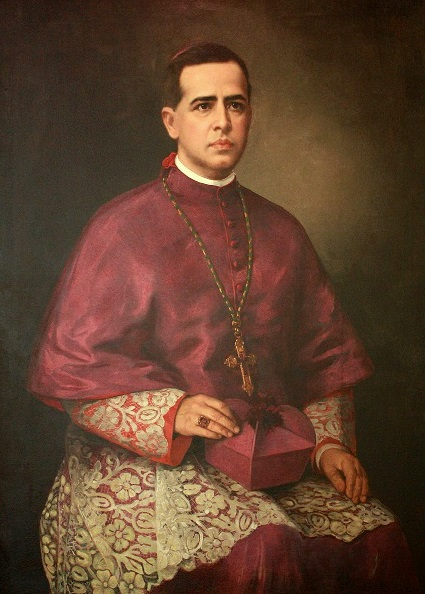
- Cardinal Arcoverde; portrait by Almeida Júnior
- Archdiocese: Rio de Janeiro
- Province: Rio de Janeiro
- In office: 24 August 1897 - 18 April 1930
- Predecessor: João Fernando Santiago Esberard
- Successor: Sebastião da Silveira Cintra

Orders
- Created cardinal: December 11, 1905 by Pope Pius X
- Rank: Cardinal-priest

Personal details
- Born: Cardinal Dom Joaquim Arcoverde de Albuquerque Cavalcanti; January 17, 1850 Cimbres, Brazil
- Died: April 18, 1930 (aged 80) Rio de Janeiro, Brazil
- Denomination: Roman Catholic
- Coat of arms

Styles of Joaquim Arcoverde de Albuquerque Cavalcanti
- Reference style: His Eminence
- Spoken style: Your Eminence
- Informal style: Cardinal
- See: São Sebastião do Rio de Janeiro

Cardinal Dom Joaquim Arcoverde de Albuquerque Cavalcanti (January 17, 1850 – April 18, 1930) was a Brazilian prelate of the Catholic Church, who served as Archbishop of Rio de Janeiro from 1897 to 1930. He was made a cardinal in 1905, the first cardinal born in Latin America.

== Biography ==
=== Early life and ministry ===
Arcoverde was born into a prominent family in Cimbres, province of Pernambuco, in the Northeast of Brazil. He showed an early vocation for the priesthood but the absence of local seminaries meant that he did all his studies prior to becoming a priest in Rome. However, after being ordained in 1874, Arcoverde returned to Olinda to become rector of the new seminary there. He was nominated a bishop by Pope Leo XIII in 1888 but refused; however, when Pope Leo, obviously believing very firmly in his ability, nominated him again three years later to the diocese of Goiás he accepted his nomination very willingly.

=== Archbishop ===
In 1897 Arcoverde was promoted to the archiepiscopal see of São Sebastião do Rio de Janeiro, then clearly the highest position on the Latin American Church. Pope Pius X made him a cardinal in his second consistory on December 11, 1905. He was the first cardinal born in Latin America. He was only the second cardinal to serve as ordinary of a diocese located in the Southern Hemisphere behind Francis Patrick Moran, the Irish-born Archbishop of Sydney who had been elevated in 1885. Arcoverde was the first cardinal to be born in the Southern Hemisphere.

He participated in the conclave in 1914 but did not attempt to reach Rome in time for the 1922 conclave, due to ill health.

=== Death ===
Arcoverde led the See of Rio de Janeiro for more than 30 years, until his death in 1930, although in his later years (from 1921 onwards), due to failing health, he was aided by a coadjutor archbishop. He died in Rio de Janeiro, then the Brazilian capital.

Preceded by João Fernando Santiago Esberard	Archbishop of Rio de Janeiro; 24 August 1897–18 April 1930	Succeeded by Sebastião da Silveira Cintra

== See also ==
- List of cardinals of Brazil
