= Campanha =

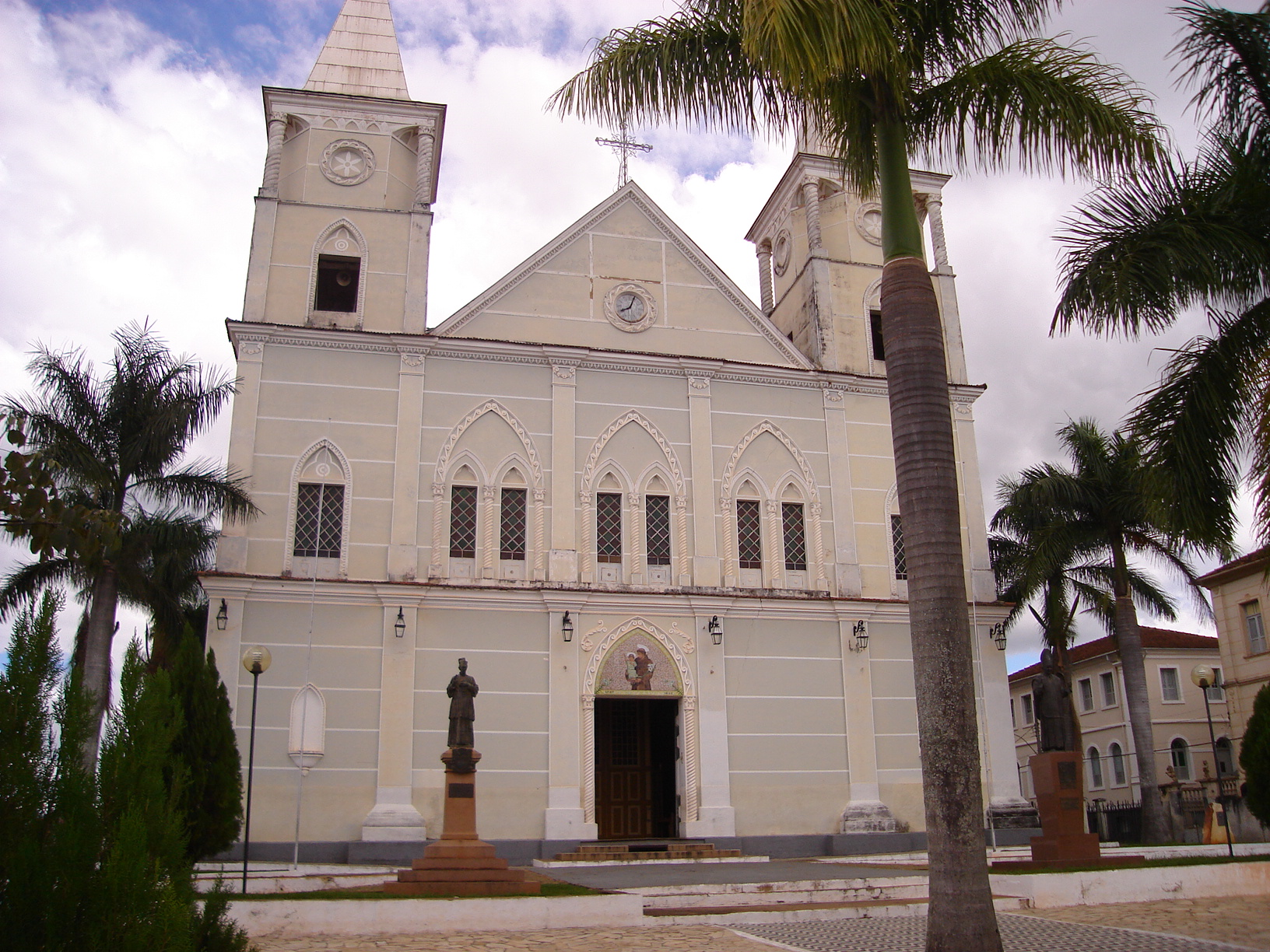

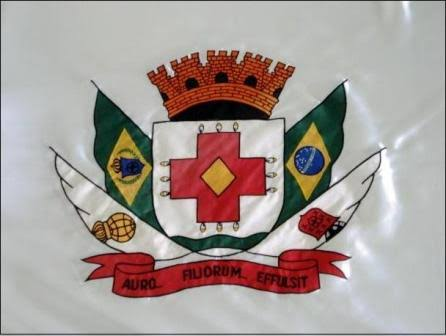
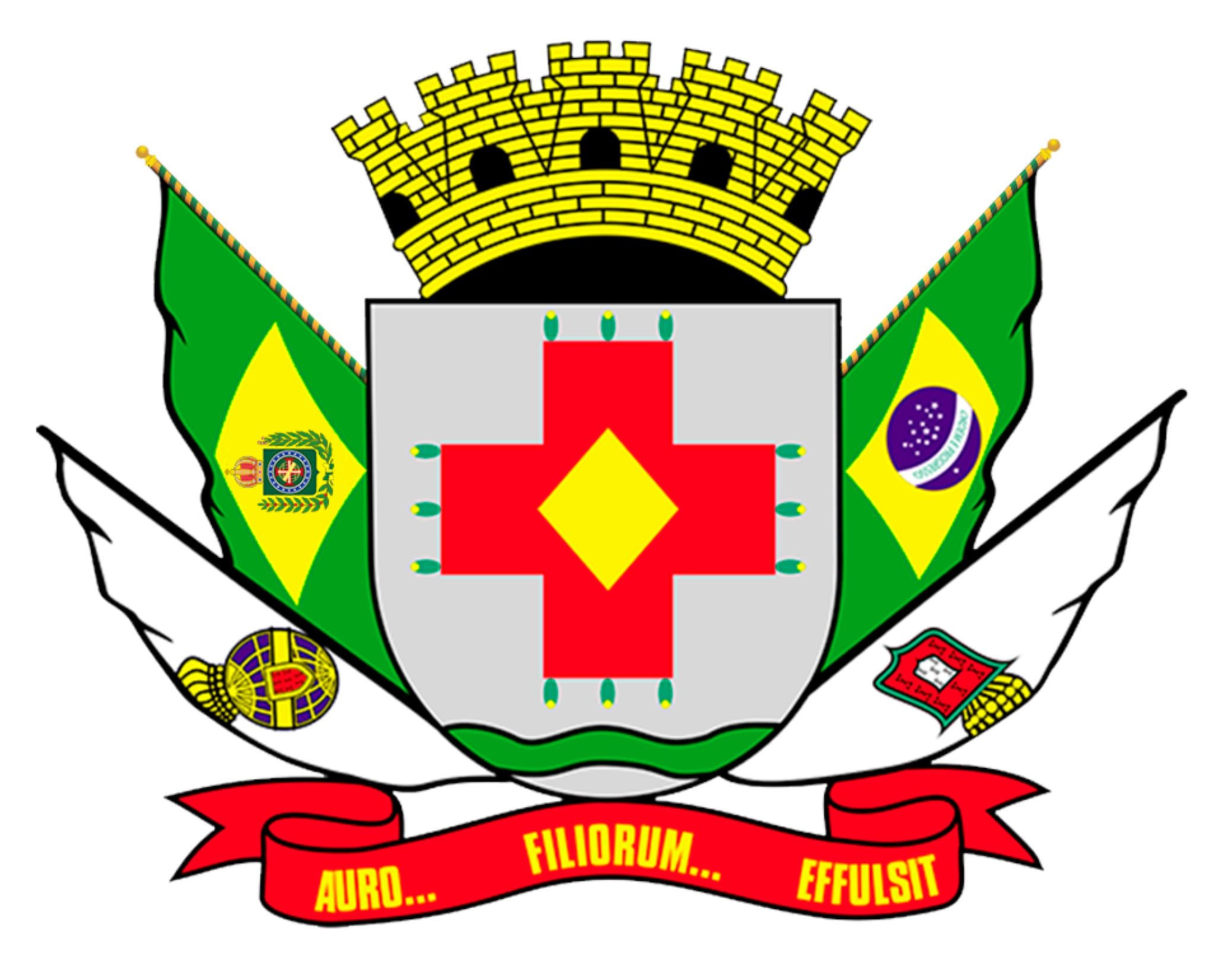
- Flag Coat of arms

- Location in Minas Gerais

- Location within Brazil
- Coordinates: 21°50′20″S 45°23′29″W
- Country: Brazil
- Region: Southeast
- State: Minas Gerais

Population (2020)
  - Total: 16,762
- Website: Campanha Online

Campanha is a town (município) in the Brazilian state of Minas Gerais. In 2020 its population was estimated at 16,762 inhabitants. The town is the seat of the Roman Catholic Diocese of Campanha.

== Notable people ==
- Vital Brazil (1865–1950), physician and biomedical scientist, born in Campanha

== See also ==
- List of municipalities in Minas Gerais
