= Sacred Heart Cathedral, Mandalay =

Sacred Heart Cathedral
- ရွှေနှလုံးတော် ကက်သလစ် ဘုရားရှိခိုးကျောင်း
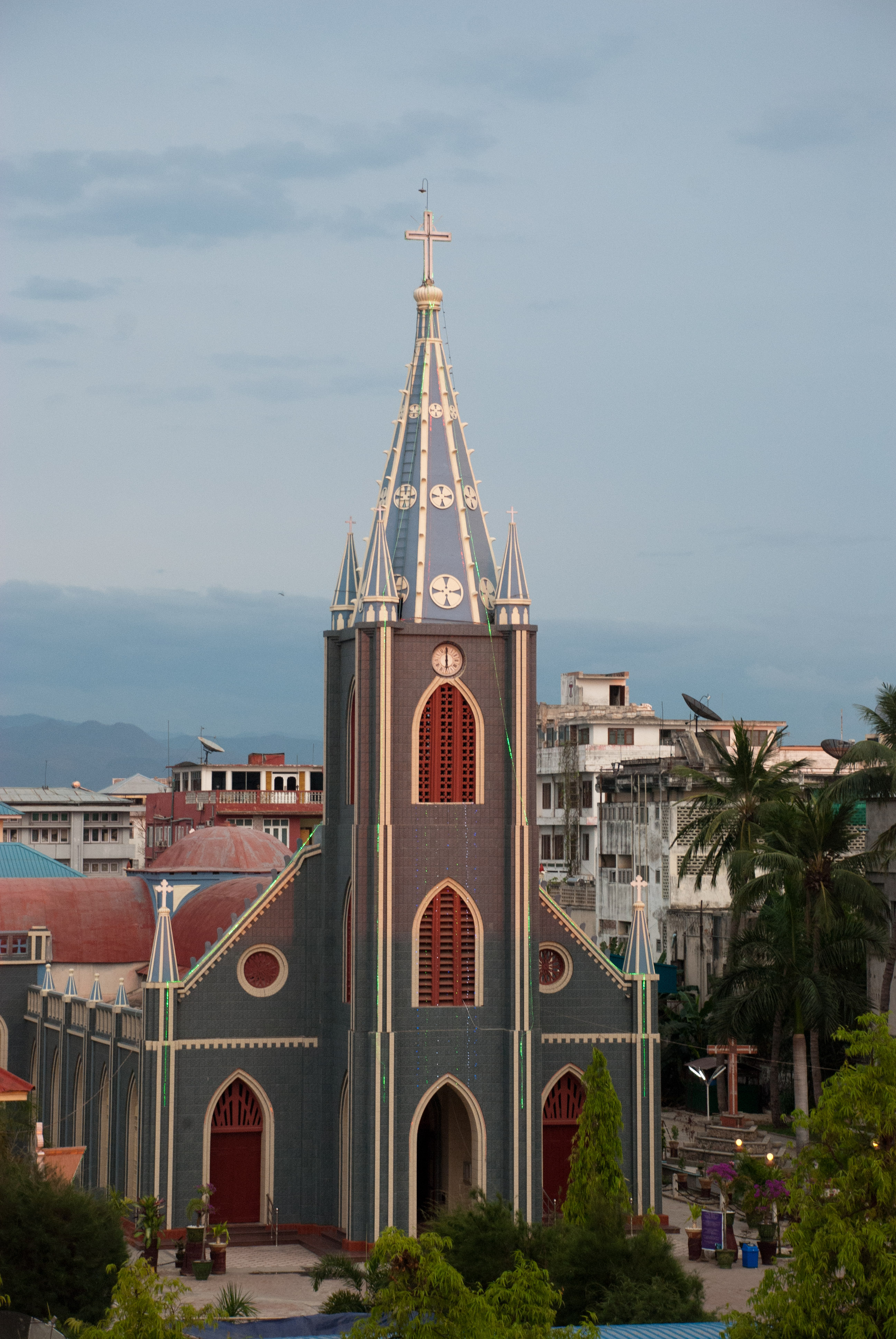
- Sacred Heart Cathedral
- 21°59′02″N 96°04′48″E
- Location: 81st Road, bet. 25th and 26th Streets; Aungmyethazan, Mandalay
- Country: Myanmar
- Denomination: Roman Catholic Church

History
- Consecrated: 8 December 1890

The Sacred Heart Cathedral (Burmese: ရွှေနှလုံးတော် ကက်သလစ် ဘုရားရှိခိုးကျောင်း) is a Roman Catholic cathedral in Mandalay, Myanmar.

Construction of the cathedral began in 1873 and progressed through several development phases before its consecration on 8 December 1890. The cathedral is located on 81st Road between 25th and 26th streets.

It serves as the headquarters of the Metropolitan Archdiocese of Mandalay (Archidioecesis Mandalayensis), follows the Roman or Latin rite and is decorated with blue and white colors. It was dedicated as its name indicates the Sacred Heart of Jesus a traditional Catholic devotion honoring the Heart of Jesus of Nazareth, as a symbol of divine love.

The cathedral offers Burmese language masses all week and Friday and Saturday some services in English. On the outside of the cathedral is located a small chapel with the image of Jesus.

== See also ==
- Roman Catholicism in Myanmar
- Sacred Heart Cathedral (disambiguation)
