= Archdiocese of Uberaba =

Catholic ecclesiastical territory

Archdiocese of Uberaba Archidioecesis Uberabensis

Catholic
- Sacred Heart of Jesus Cathedral, Uberaba

- Coat of arms

Location
- Country: Brazil
- Ecclesiastical province: Uberaba
- Coordinates: 19.7509°S 47.9372°W

Statistics
- Area: 27,228 km^{2} (10,513 sq mi)
- Population: Total; Catholics: (as of 2004); 693,185; 444,081 (64.1%)

Information
- Rite: Latin Rite
- Established: 29 September 1907 (119 years ago)
- Cathedral: Sacred Heart of Jesus Cathedral, Uberaba

Current leadership
- Pope: Leo XIV
- Archbishop: Paulo Mendes Peixoto

Website
- www.arquidiocesedeuberaba.org.br

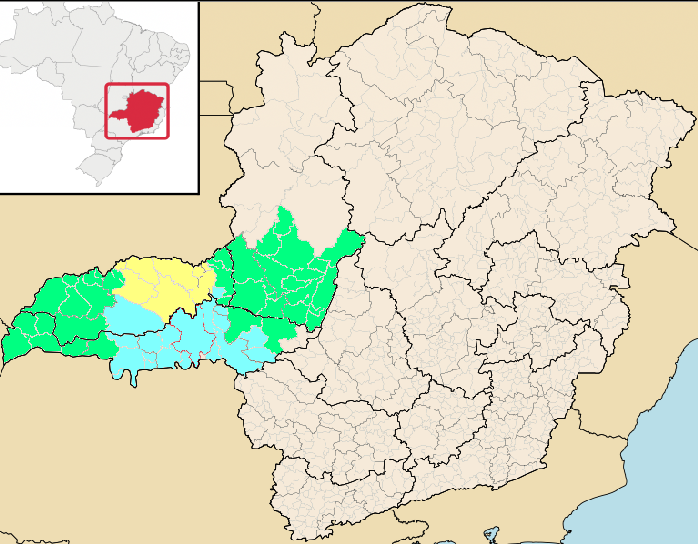
Ecclesiastical Province of Uberaba.

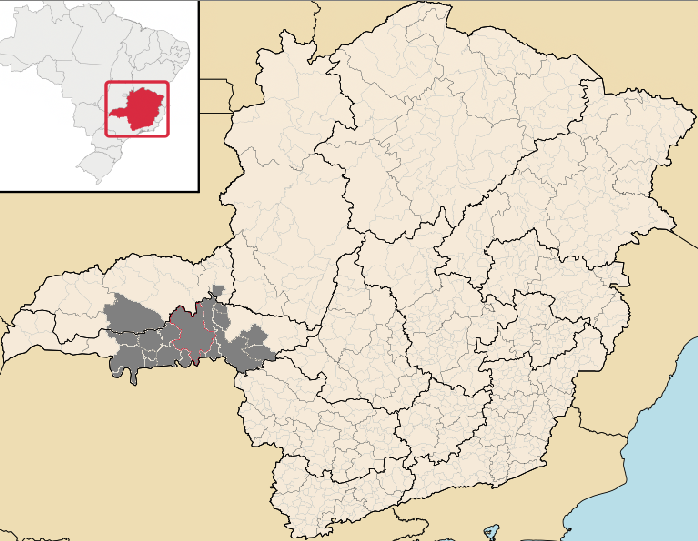
Diocese of Uberaba.

The Roman Catholic Archdiocese of Uberaba (Latin: Archidioecesis Uberabensis) is an archdiocese located in the city of Uberaba in Brazil.

== History ==
- 29 September 1907: Established as Diocese of Uberaba from the Diocese of Goiás
- 14 April 1962: Promoted as Metropolitan Archdiocese of Uberaba

== Bishops ==
=== Ordinaries, in reverse chronological order ===
- Archbishops of Uberaba (Roman rite), below
  - Archbishop Paulo Mendes Peixoto, (2014.03.07)
  - Archbishop Aloísio Roque Oppermann, S.C.J. (1996.02.28 – 2012.03.07)
  - Archbishop Benedito de Ulhôa Vieira (1978.07.14 – 1996.02.28)
  - Archbishop Alexandre Gonçalves do Amaral (1962.04.14 – 1978.07.14)
- Bishops of Uberaba (Roman Rite), below
  - Bishop Alexandre Gonçalves do Amaral (later Archbishop) (1939.08.05 – 1962.04.14)
  - Bishop Antonio Colturato, O.F.M. Cap. (1929.08.02 – 1938.04.12), appointed Bishop of Botucatu
  - Bishop Antônio de Almeida Lustosa, S.D.B. (1924.07.04 – 1928.12.17), appointed Bishop of Corumbá, Mato Grosso do Sul; future Archbishop
  - Bishop José Tupinambá da Frota (1923.04.06 – 1924.03.10), appointed Bishop of Sobral, Ceara
  - Bishop Eduardo Duarte e Silva (1907.11.06 – 1923.05.14), appointed titular Archbishop upon resignation

=== Coadjutor archbishop ===
- José Pedro de Araújo Costa (1968-1978), did not succeed to see

=== Other priests of this diocese who became bishops ===
- Almir Marques Ferreira, appointed Auxiliary Bishop of Sorocaba in 1957
- Antônio Braz Benevente, appointed Bishop of Jacarezinho, Parana in 2010

== Suffragan dioceses ==
- Diocese of Ituiutaba
- Diocese of Patos de Minas
- Diocese of Uberlândia

== Sources ==
- GCatholic.org
- Catholic Hierarchy
- website (Portuguese)
