= Sacred Heart Cathedral, Anqing =

Sacred Heart Cathedral
- 安庆耶稣圣心主教座堂
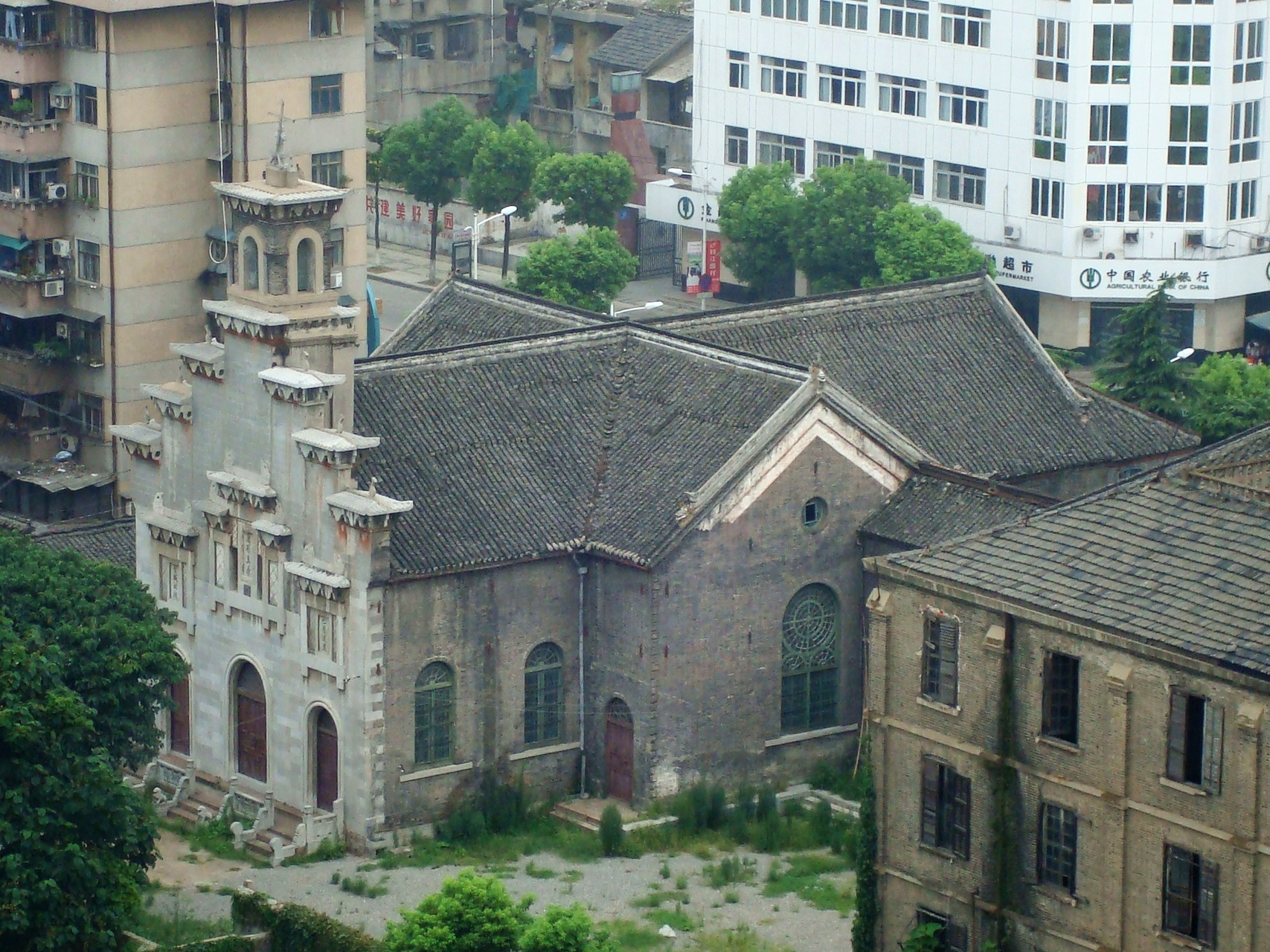
- Sacred Heart Cathedral
- Location: Anqing
- Country: China
- Denomination: Roman Catholic Church

The Sacred Heart Cathedral (Chinese: 安庆耶稣圣心主教座堂) is a religious building of the Catholic Church, which is part of the Metropolitan Archdiocese of Anqing in China (安慶). Following the changes of 2001, it is considered by the Chinese authorities as a church belonging to the great diocese of Anhui. Neither the state nor the administrative divisions are recognized by the Holy See.

== History ==
The church follows the Roman or Latin rite and was built in 1872 under the direction of the French Jesuits. On February 21, 1929, with the creation of the Archdiocese of Anqing, the church received the status of cathedral. Between 1957 and 1983, the Catholic religion was banned. With the political and economic opening of China and the change in religious policy, the cathedral once again became a place of worship, and has been that way since 1983. It is also part of the protected monuments of Anhui Province.

== See also ==
- Roman Catholicism in China
- Sacred Heart Cathedral (disambiguation)
