= Sacred Heart Cathedral, Pretoria =

Cathedral of the Sacred Heart
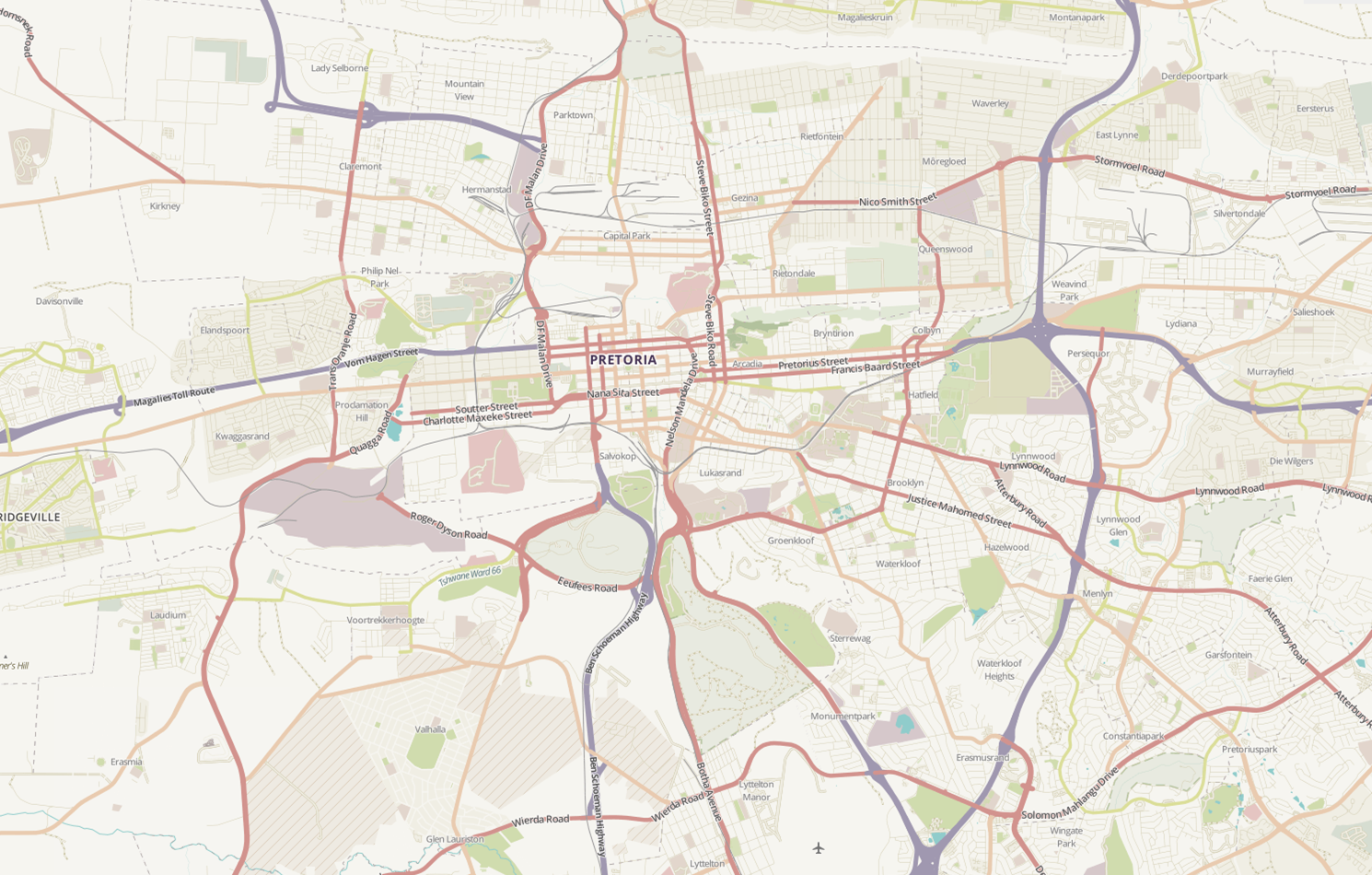
- Location within Pretoria Location within Gauteng
- 25.751409°S 28.185829°E
- Location: Pretoria
- Country: South Africa
- Denomination: Roman Catholic Church

The Cathedral of the Sacred Heart or just Pretoria Catholic Cathedral is a religious building belonging to the Catholic Church and is located in the Bosman street of the town of Pretoria, in Gauteng province in South Africa.

The cathedral was built in 1877 in the Gothic architectural style, follows the Roman or Latin rite and serves as headquarters of the Metropolitan Archdiocese of Pretoria (Archidioecesis Praetoriensis) which was created in 1951 by the bull Suprema Nobis of Pope Pius XII. It has the dignity of cathedral since 1948.

== See also ==
- Roman Catholicism in South Africa
- Sacred Heart Cathedral (disambiguation)
