= Benedito de Ulhôa Vieira =

Brazilian prelate

- Archbishop of Archdiocese of Uberaba Emeritus
- Church: Roman Catholic Church
- See: Archdiocese of Uberaba
- In office: 1978 - 1996
- Predecessor: Alexandre Gonçalves do Amaral
- Successor: Aloísio Roque Oppermann S.C.J.

Orders
- Ordination: December 8, 1948

Personal details
- Born: October 9, 1920 Mococa, Brazil
- Died: August 2, 2014 (aged 93)

Benedito de Ulhôa Vieira (October 9, 1920 – August 3, 2014) was a Brazilian prelate of the Roman Catholic Church.

Vieira was born in Mococa, Brazil and ordained a priest on December 8, 1948. Vieira was appointed auxiliary bishop of the Archdiocese of São Paulo as well as titular bishop of Bitettumon November 29, 1971 and was ordained bishop on January 25, 1972. Vieira was appointed archbishop of the Archdiocese of Uberaba on July 14, 1978, where he served until his retirement on February 28, 1996.
