= Mário Antônio da Silva =

21st-century Brazilian Catholic bishop

The Most Reverend Mário Antônio da Silva
- Archbishop of Aparecida
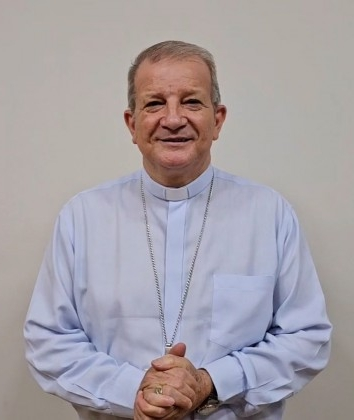
- Archbishop Mário Antônio
- Church: Catholic Church
- Archdiocese: Aparecida
- See: Aparecida
- Appointed: 2 March 2026
- Installed: 2 May 2026
- Predecessor: Orlando Brandes
- Previous posts: Auxiliary Bishop of Manaus (2010–2016); Bishop of Roraima (2016-2022); Archbishop of Cuiabá (2022-2026)

Personal details
- Born: Mário Antônio da Silva; 17 October 1966 (age 59) Itararé, São Paulo, Brazil
- Denomination: Roman Catholic
- Motto: Testificari et Ministrare (To witness and minister)
- Coat of arms

Styles of Mário Antônio da Silva
- Reference style: The Most Reverend
- Spoken style: Your Excellency
- Religious style: Archbishop

Mário Antônio da Silva (born 17 October 1966) is a Brazilian prelate of the Catholic Church who has been the Archbishop of Aparecida since 2026. He was Auxiliary bishop of Manaus from 2010 to 2016, Bishop of Roraima from 2016 to 2022 and Archbishop of Cuiabá from 2022 to 2026.

== Biography ==
Mário Antônio da Silva was born in Itararé, State of São Paulo, on 17 October 1966. He studied philosophy and theology at the Divine Mestre Diocesan Seminary in Jacarezinho from 1985 to 1991. He then earned a licentiate in moral theology at the Alphonsian Academy in Rome (1996-1998).

On 21 December 1991 he was ordained a priest of the Diocese of Jacarezinho, where he worked as Spiritual Director (1992-1993) and then Rector of the Minor Seminary Nossa Senhora da Assunção (1994-1996); Coordinator of Vocation Ministry (1993-1996); Professor of Moral Theology and Spiritual Director of the Divine Major Seminary Mestre; Parochial Vicar; Pastor and Chancellor.

On 9 June 2010, Pope Benedict XVI named him auxiliary bishop of Manaus. He received his episcopal consecration on 20 August that year from Mauro Aparecido dos Santos, Archbishop of Cascavel. On 22 June 2016, Pope Francis named him as Bishop of Roraima, and later on 23 February 2022, appointed him as Archbishop of Cuiabá. On 2 March 2026, Pope Leo XIV named Monsignor Mário Antônio as Archbishop of Aparecida. He was enthroned 2 months later.

He is vice president of the Episcopal Conference of Brazil.

He was a participant in the Synod of Bishops for the Pan-Amazon region in 2019. He was one of four Synod prelates elected on 7 October to the thirteen-person committee to prepare the Synod's concluding document. (Note: Five other members are synod officials who serve ex offico and four are named by Pope Francis.)
