= Sacred Heart Cathedral =

Sacred Heart Cathedral may refer to:

== Africa ==
- Sacred Heart Cathedral, Bamako, Mali
- Sacred Heart Cathedral, Bloemfontein, South Africa
- Sacred Heart Cathedral, Brazzaville, Republic of Congo
- Sacred Heart Cathedral, Freetown, Sierra Leone
- Sacred Heart Cathedral, Lomé, Togo
- Sacred Heart Cathedral, Moundou, Chad
- Sacred Heart Cathedral, Pretoria, South Africa
- Sacred Heart Cathedral, Harare, Zimbabwe

== Americas ==
=== Brazil ===
- Sacred Heart of Jesus Cathedral, Londrina
- Sacred Heart Cathedral, Petrolina
- Sacred Heart of Jesus Cathedral, Porto Velho
- Sacred Heart of Jesus Cathedral, Uberaba

=== Canada ===
- Sacred Heart Cathedral (Bathurst, New Brunswick)
- Sacred Heart Cathedral (Kamloops), British Columbia
- Sacred Heart Cathedral (Prince George), Prince George, British Columbia

=== Mexico ===
- Sacred Heart of Jesus Cathedral, Ciudad Obregón
- Ciudad Victoria Cathedral
- Sacred Heart of Jesus Cathedral, Ecatepec

=== United States ===
- Basilica of the Co-Cathedral of the Sacred Heart (Charleston, West Virginia)
- Cathedral Basilica of the Sacred Heart, Newark, New Jersey
- Cathedral of the Most Sacred Heart of Jesus (Knoxville, Tennessee)
- Cathedral of the Sacred Heart (Pensacola, Florida)
- Cathedral of the Sacred Heart (Pueblo, Colorado), listed on the NRHP in Colorado
- Cathedral of the Sacred Heart (Richmond, Virginia), listed on the NRHP in Virginia
- Cathedral of the Sacred Heart (San Angelo, Texas)
- Cathedral of the Sacred Heart (Winona, Minnesota)
- Co-Cathedral of the Sacred Heart (Houston), Texas
- Sacred Heart Cathedral (Amarillo, Texas)
- Sacred Heart Cathedral (Davenport, Iowa), listed on the NRHP in Iowa
- Sacred Heart Cathedral (Dodge City, Kansas), listed on the NRHP in Kansas
- Sacred Heart Cathedral (Fairbanks, Alaska)
- Sacred Heart Cathedral (Gallup, New Mexico)
- Sacred Heart Cathedral (Raleigh, North Carolina)
- Sacred Heart Cathedral (Rochester, New York)
- Sacred Heart Cathedral, Sacred Heart School and Christian Brothers Home, Duluth, Minnesota, listed on the NRHP in Minnesota
- Sacred Heart Cathedral (Salina, Kansas)

== Asia ==
=== China ===
- Sacred Heart Cathedral, Anqing
- Sacred Heart Cathedral (Guangzhou)
- Sacred Heart of Jesus Cathedral, Harbin
- Sacred Heart Cathedral, Hohhot
- Sacred Heart Cathedral (Jinan)
- Sacred Heart Cathedral, Kaifeng
- Sacred Heart of Jesus Cathedral, Shenyang
- Sacred Heart Cathedral (Xuzhou)
- Sacred Heart Cathedral, Yangzhou

=== India ===
- Cathedral of the Sacred Heart, Dibrugarh, Dibrugarh, Assam
- Cathedral of the Sacred Heart, Asansol, Asansol, West Bengal
- Sacred Heart Cathedral, Shimoga, Shimoga, Karnataka
- Sacred Heart Cathedral, New Delhi
- Sacred Heart Cathedral, Rourkela, Odisha
- Sacred Heart Cathedral, Dharmapuri, Tamil Nadu
- Sacred Heart Cathedral, Ooty, Tamil Nadu
- Sacred Heart Cathedral, Tanjore, Tanjore, Tamil Nadu
- Sacred Heart Cathedral, Tuticorin, Tuticorin, Tamil Nadu
- Sacred Heart Syro-Malabar Cathedral, Rajkot, Gujarat

=== Malaysia ===
- Cathedral of the Sacred Heart of Jesus, Johor Bahru, Malaysia
- Sacred Heart Cathedral, Kota Kinabalu, Malaysia
- Sacred Heart Cathedral, Sibu, Malaysia

=== Elsewhere in Asia ===
- Sacred Heart Cathedral, Maliana, East Timor
- Sacred Heart Cathedral, Yokohama, Japan
- Sacred Heart Cathedral, Vientiane, Laos
- Sacred Heart Cathedral, Mandalay, Myanmar
- Sacred Heart Cathedral, Lahore, Pakistan
- Sacred Heart Cathedral, Tashkent, Uzbekistan

== Europe ==
- Sacred Heart Cathedral, Sarajevo, Bosnia and Herzegovina
- Sacred Heart Cathedral, Rēzekne, Latvia
- Cathedral of the Sacred Heart of Jesus (Skopje), North Macedonia

== Oceania ==
=== Australia ===
- Sacred Heart Cathedral, Bendigo, Victoria
- Sacred Heart Cathedral, Broken Hill, New South Wales
- Sacred Heart Cathedral, Hamilton, New South Wales
- Sacred Heart Cathedral, Townsville, Queensland

=== Elsewhere in Oceania ===
- Sacred Heart Cathedral, Suva, Fiji
- Sacred Heart Cathedral, Kiribati, Micronesia
- Sacred Heart Cathedral, Wellington, New Zealand

== See also ==
- Sacré-Cœur, Paris
- Sacred Heart (disambiguation)
- Sacred Heart Church (disambiguation)
- Cathédrale du Sacré-Cœur (disambiguation)
