= Diocese of Taubaté =

Catholic ecclesiastical territory

Diocese of Taubaté Dioecesis Taubatensis Diocese de Taubaté

Catholic

Location
- Country: Brazil
- Ecclesiastical province: Aparecida
- Metropolitan: Aparecida

Statistics
- Area: 4,626 km^{2} (1,786 sq mi)
- Population: Total; Catholics: (as of 2010); 666,000; 567,000 (85.1%)

Information
- Rite: Latin Rite
- Established: 7 June 1908 (118 years ago)
- Cathedral: Cathedral of St Francis of Assisi in Taubaté

Current leadership
- Pope: Leo XIV
- Bishop: Wilson Luís Angotti Filho
- Metropolitan Archbishop: Orlando Brandes
- Bishops emeritus: Carmo João Rhoden, S.C.J.

Website
- Website of the Diocese

The Roman Catholic Diocese of Taubaté (Latin: Dioecesis Taubatensis) is a diocese located in the city of Taubaté in the ecclesiastical province of Aparecida in Brazil.

== History ==
- 7 June 1908: Established as Diocese of Taubaté from the Diocese of São Paulo

== Special churches ==
- Minor Basilicas:
  - Basílica do Senhor Bom Jesus, Tremembé, São Paulo

== Leadership ==
- Bishops of Taubaté (Roman rite) in reverse chronological order
  - Bishop Wilson Luís Angotti Filho (15 April 2015 – present)
  - Bishop Carmo João Rhoden, S.C.J. (22 May 1996 – 14 April 2015)
  - Bishop Antônio Afonso de Miranda, S.D.N. (6 August 1981 – 22 May 1996)
  - Bishop José Antônio do Couto, S.C.I. (5 May 1976 – 6 August 1981)
  - Bishop Francisco do Borja Pereira do Amaral (3 October 1944 – 5 May 1976)
  - Bishop André Arcoverde de Albuquerque Cavalcanti (8 August 1936 – 8 November 1941)
  - Bishop Epaminondas Nuñez de Ávila e Silva (29 April 1909 – 29 June 1935)

== Other affiliated bishops ==
=== Coadjutor bishop ===
- José Antônio do Couto, S.C.I. (1974-1976)

=== Auxiliary bishop ===
- Gabriel Paulino Bueno Couto, O. Carm. (1955-1965), appointed Auxiliary Bishop of São Paulo

=== Other priest of this diocese who became bishop ===
- Benedito Beni dos Santos, appointed Auxiliary Bishop of São Paulo in 2001
