= Sacred Heart of Jesus Cathedral, Uberaba =

Sacred Heart of Jesus Cathedral
- Catedral Metropolitana Sagrado Coração de Jesus
- Sacred Heart of Jesus Cathedral
- Location: Uberaba
- Country: Brazil
- Denomination: Roman Catholic Church

Administration
- Archdiocese: Uberaba

The Sacred Heart of Jesus Cathedral (Portuguese: Catedral Metropolitana Sagrado Coração de Jesus) Also Uberaba Cathedral It is a Catholic church located in the city of Uberaba, in the state of Minas Gerais in Brazil. It is the seat of the Archdiocese of Uberaba, whose jurisdiction covers 20 municipalities in the Triângulo Mineiro and Alto Paranaíba.

== Description ==
The cathedral also houses a parish whose head is the Sacred Heart of Jesus and whose patron saint is St. Anthony and St. Sebastian. The parish has three chapels dependent on it: the Chapel of St. Peter and the Chapel of St. Paul, in the Jockey Park, and the Chapel of the House of St. Joseph. At present, the cathedral is under the administration of the parish priest Monsignor Valmir Ribeiro.

The construction of the cathedral was completed on September 30, 1905, but it was only inaugurated on January 27, 1907.

== See also ==
- Roman Catholicism in Brazil
- Sacred Heart of Jesus Cathedral
