= Diocese of Lorena =

Catholic ecclesiastical territory

Diocese of Lorena Dioecesis Lorenensis Diocese de Lorena

Catholic

Location
- Country: Brazil
- Ecclesiastical province: Aparecida
- Metropolitan: Aparecida

Statistics
- Area: 5,055 km^{2} (1,952 sq mi)
- Population: Total; Catholics: (as of 2004); 263,590; 198,938 (75.5%)

Information
- Rite: Latin Rite
- Established: 31 July 1937 (89 years ago)
- Cathedral: Cathedral of Our Lady of Mercy in Lorena, São Paulo

Current leadership
- Pope: Leo XIV
- Bishop: Joaquim Wladimir Lopes Dias
- Metropolitan Archbishop: Orlando Brandes
- Bishops emeritus: Benedito Beni dos Santos

Map
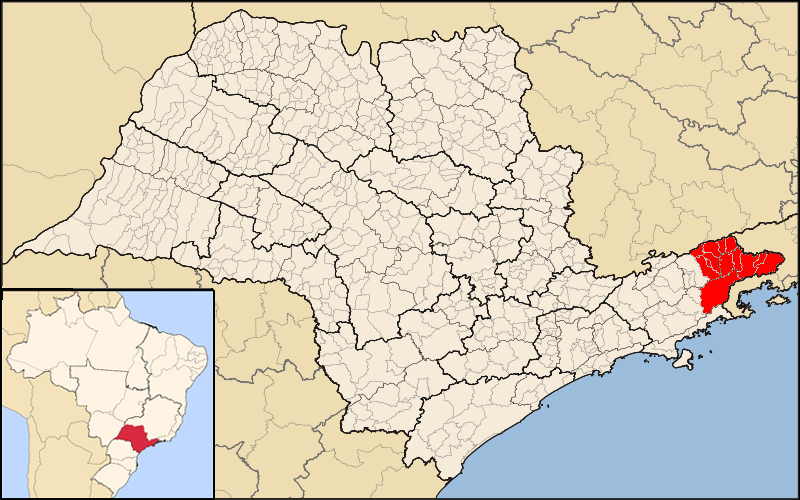

Website
- www.mitralorena.com.br

The Roman Catholic Diocese of Lorena (Latin: Dioecesis Lorenensis) is a diocese located in the city of Lorena, São Paulo, in the ecclesiastical province of Aparecida in Brazil.

On Tuesday, 18 August 2012, the then-Bishop of Lorena, Bishop Benedito Beni dos Santos, was named by Pope Benedict XVI to serve as one of the papally-appointed Synod Fathers for the October 2012 13th Ordinary General Assembly of the Synod of Bishops on the New Evangelization.

== History ==
- 31 July 1937: Established as Diocese of Lorena from the Diocese of Taubaté

== Leadership ==
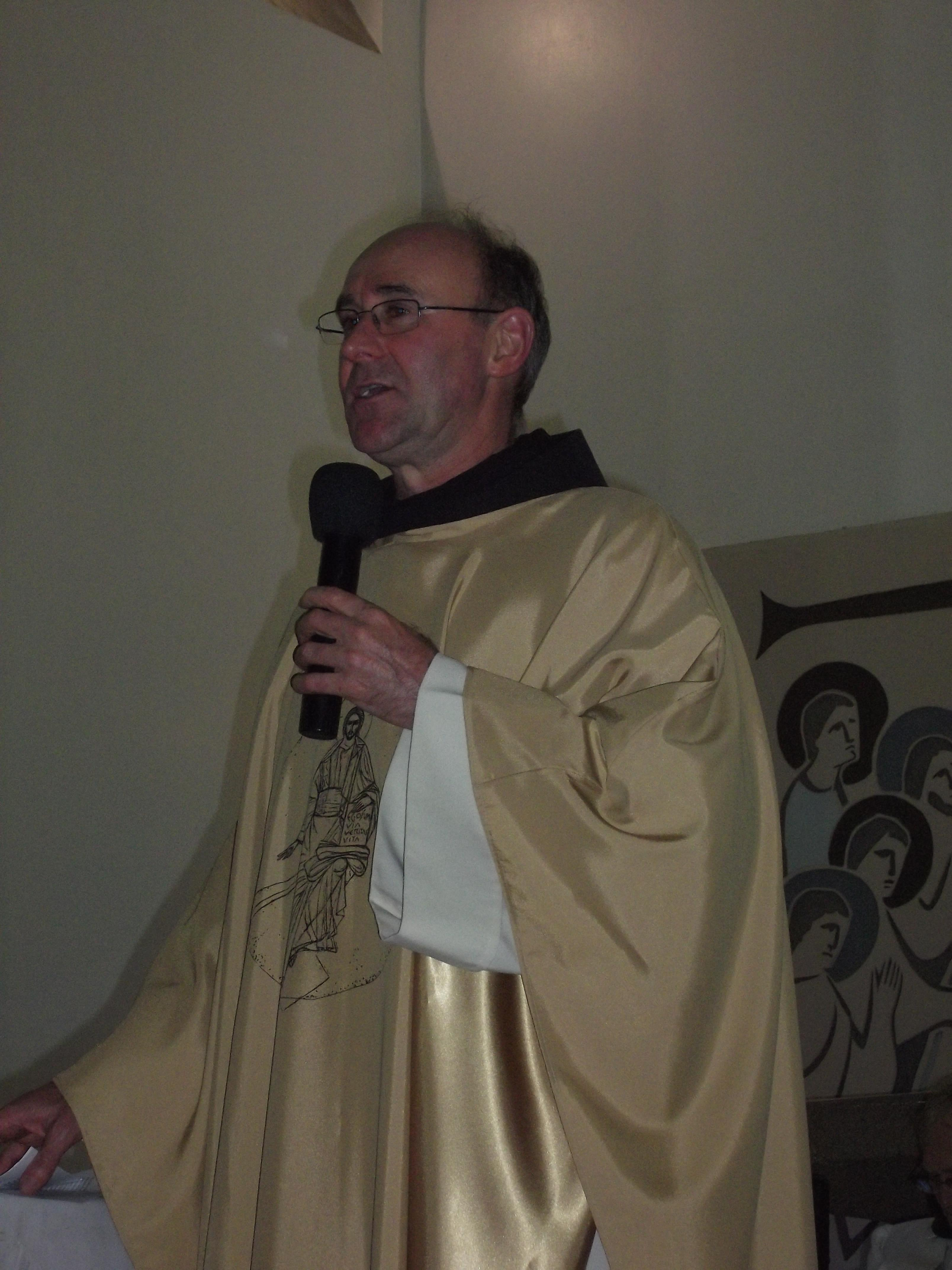
Fr. João Inácio Müller, OFM

- Bishops of Lorena (Roman rite), listed in reverse chronological order
  - Bishop Joaquim Wladimir Lopes Dias (13 January 2021 – present)
  - Bishop João Inácio Müller, O.F.M. (25 September 2013 – 15 May 2019); formerly, Minister Provincial for the Franciscans in Rio Grande do Sul, Brazil; appointed Archbishop of Campinas, São Paulo
  - Bishop Benedito Beni dos Santos (26 April 2006 – 25 September 2013)
  - Bishop Eduardo Benes de Sales Rodrigues (10 January 2001 – 4 May 2005), appointed Archbishop of Sorocaba, São Paulo)
  - Bishop João Hipólito de Morais (11 July 1977 – 10 January 2001)
  - Bishop Antônio Afonso de Miranda, S.D.N. (3 November 1971 – 11 July 1977), appointed Coadjutor Bishop of Campanha, Minas Gerais
  - Bishop Cândido Rubens Padín, O.S.B. (3 January 1966 – 27 April 1970), appointed Bishop of Bauru, São Paulo
  - Bishop José Melhado Campos (29 May 1960 – 22 February 1965), appointed Coadjutor Bishop of Sorocaba
  - Bishop Luís Gonzaga Peluso (13 June 1946 – 25 July 1959), appointed Coadjutor Bishop of Sorocaba
  - Bishop Francisco do Borja Pereira do Amaral (21 December 1940 – 3 October 1944), appointed Bishop of Taubaté, São Paulo
