= Sacred Heart Cathedral, Yangzhou =

- 扬州耶稣圣心堂
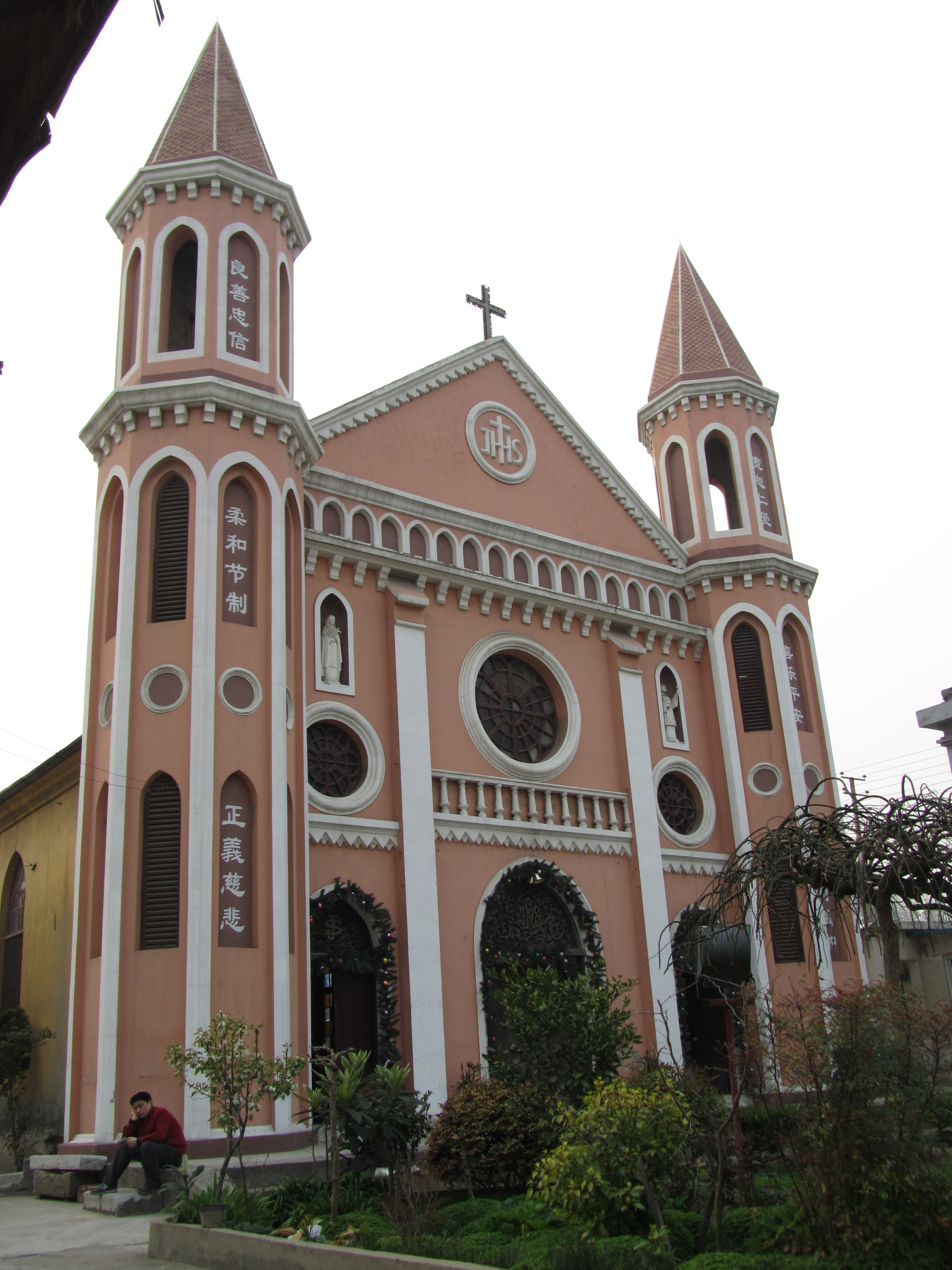
- Sacred Heart Cathedral, Yangzhou in 2011

- Location in Jiangsu
- 32°23′25″N 119°26′49″E
- Location: Yangzhou, Jiangsu, China
- Denomination: Roman Catholic

History
- Status: Parish church
- Founded: 1873
- Founder: Henri Le Lec

Architecture
- Functional status: Active
- Architectural type: Church building
- Style: Gothic Revival architecture
- Groundbreaking: 1873
- Completed: 1875

Specifications
- Materials: Granite

Chinese name
- Simplified Chinese: 扬州耶稣圣心堂
- Traditional Chinese: 揚州耶穌聖心堂
Transcriptions
Standard Mandarin
- Hanyu Pinyin: Yángzhōu Yēsū Shèngxīn Táng

The Sacred Heart Cathedral, Yangzhou (Chinese: 扬州耶稣圣心堂), also known as Catholic Church of the Sacred Heart of Jesus, is a Gothic Revival Roman Catholic cathedral in Yangzhou, Jiangsu, China. It is the seat of the Apostolic Prefecture of Yangzhou.

== History ==
In 1873, French Jesuit priest Henri Le Lec (刘德耀) came to Yangzhou, Jiangsu, to buy a piece of land to build a church. The construction project of the church was launched in 1973 and was completed in 1875. French Jesuit and missionary Adrien Languillat consecrated the church on 1 January 1876.

In 1949, the Roman Curia set up the Apostolic Prefecture of Yangzhou and the church has served as the cathedral since then. In 1966, the Cultural Revolution broke out, the bell tower and Crucifixion were removed and the altar was smashed by the Red Guards. The church was subsequently repurposed as a factory floor. The church was officially reopened to the public in 1982. It was renovated and refurbished in 1985. In April 1995, it was designated as a provincial cultural relic preservation organ by the Jiangsu government.

== Architecture ==
The church faces east in the west with a Gothic Revival architecture style, covering an area of 357-square-metre (3,840 sq ft). It has two 17-metre (56 ft) high bell towers.
