= Sacred Heart Cathedral, Bamako =

Coordinates: 12.6435°N 7.9996°W

Sacred Heart Cathedral
- Cathédrale du Sacré-Cœur-de-Jésus de Bamako
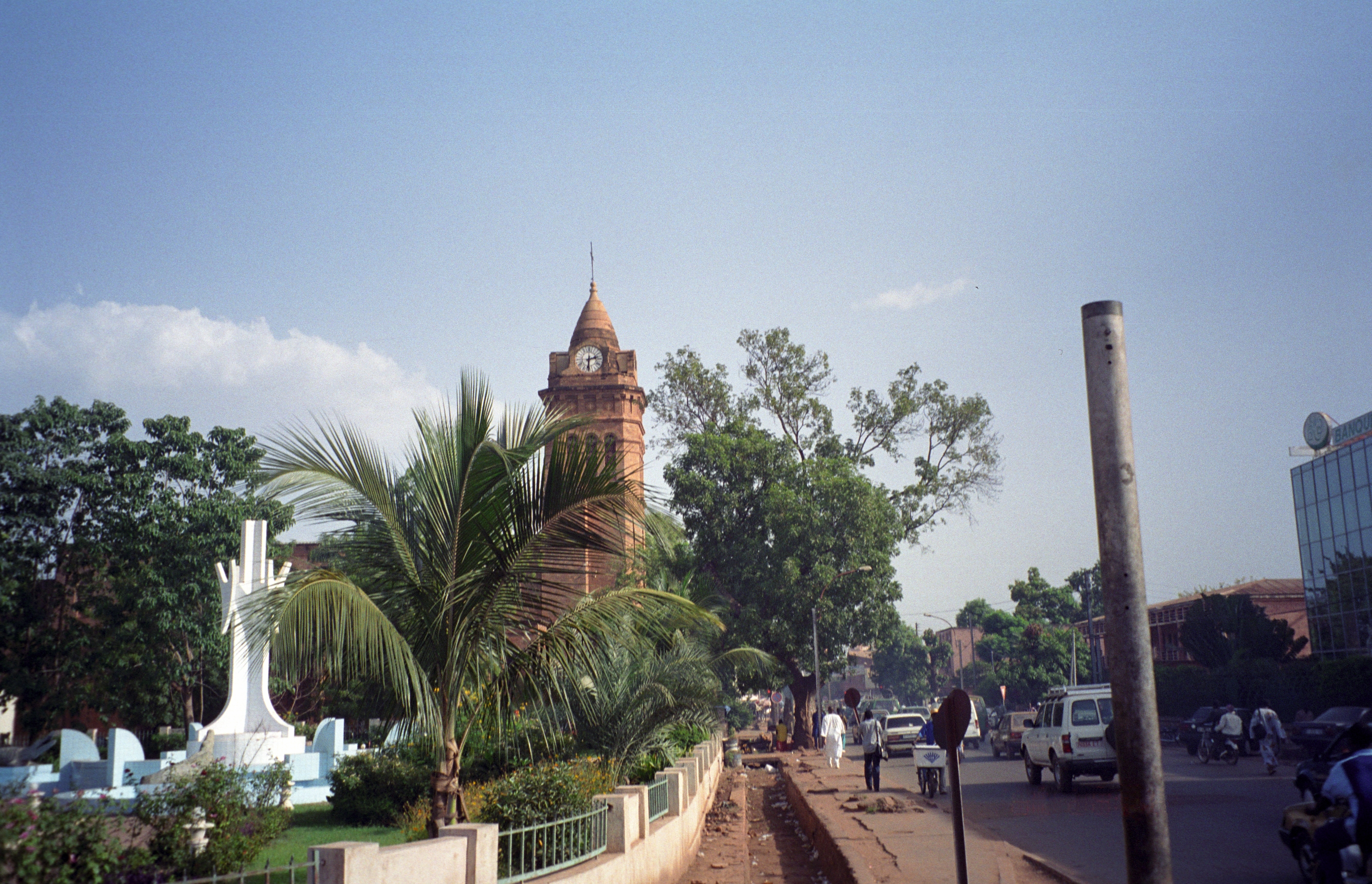
- Sacred Heart Cathedral
- Location: Bamako
- Country: Mali
- Denomination: Roman Catholic Church

The Sacred Heart Cathedral (French: Cathédrale du Sacré-Cœur-de-Jésus de Bamako) is located in Bamako, the capital of Mali, and serves as the cathedral of the Archdiocese of Bamako.

== History ==
Bamako was originally a traditional village. It gradually urbanized in the late nineteenth century, increasingly attracting newcomers, particularly after being designated as the seat of government of the colony in 1897. It was in Kati (about 15 km from Bamako) that, by the end of 1897, the first Catholic mission was established, from which Catholic priests visited Christians in Bamako, primarily officers, merchants, workers, and soldiers. In 1907, the Catholic mission of Kati acquired land in Bamako and, in 1910, built a building that served as a chapel for regular services. Construction of the cathedral began, however, on February 21, 1925, with the blessing of the first stone by Archbishop Souvart, in the presence of Marshal Petain. Two years later, the building came into service. The cathedral was completed in 1936. Until 1957, it was the only official place of Catholic worship in the city. Bishop Pierre-Louis Leclerc was installed as the first archbishop of Bamako on February 21, 1956. He was buried in the cathedral in 1988.

== See also ==
- Roman Catholicism in Mali
- Sacred Heart Cathedral (disambiguation)
