= Francisco do Borja Pereira do Amaral =

Brazilian bishop

- Bishop of Taubaté
- Church: Catholic Church
- Diocese: Diocese of Taubaté
- In office: 3 October 1944 – 5 May 1976
- Predecessor: André Arcoverde de Albuquerque Cavalcanti
- Successor: José Antônio do Couto
- Previous post: Bishop of Lorena (1940-1944)

Orders
- Ordination: 15 August 1922
- Consecration: 16 February 1941 by Franciscus de Campos Barreto

Personal details
- Born: 10 October 1898 Campinas, São Paulo, Brazil
- Died: 1 May 1989 (aged 90)

Francisco do Borja Pereira do Amaral (10 October 1898–1 May 1989) was a Brazilian bishop. He served as Bishop of Lorena (1941-1944) and Bishop of Taubaté (1944-1976). He attended all four sessions of the Second Vatican Council. He was a supporter of lay apostolates, especially Catholic Action.
