= Cipotânea =

Brazilian municipality located in the state of Minas Gerais

Coordinates: 20°54′S 43°22′W

- Municipality
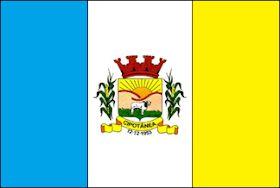
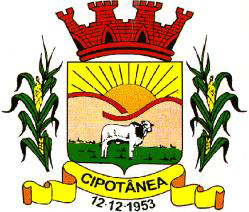
- Flag Coat of arms
- Interactive map of Cipotânea
- Country: Brazil
- State: Minas Gerais
- Region: Southeast

Population (2022 Census)
  - Total: 5,581
  - Estimate (2025): 5,549
- Time zone: UTC−3 (BRT)

Location of Cipotânea within Minas Gerais

Cipotânea is a Brazilian municipality located in the state of Minas Gerais. The city belongs to the mesoregion of Zona da Mata and to the microregion of Viçosa. Its area is 153.435 km^{2} (59.242 sq mi). As of 2025, the estimated population was 5,549.

== See also ==
- List of municipalities in Minas Gerais
