= Sacred Heart Cathedral, Brazzaville =

Coordinates: 4.27034°S 15.27399°E

Sacred Heart Cathedral
- Cathédrale du Sacré-Cœur de Brazzaville
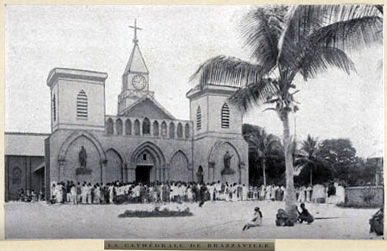
- Sacred Heart Cathedral
- Location: Brazzaville
- Country: Republic of the Congo
- Denomination: Roman Catholic Church

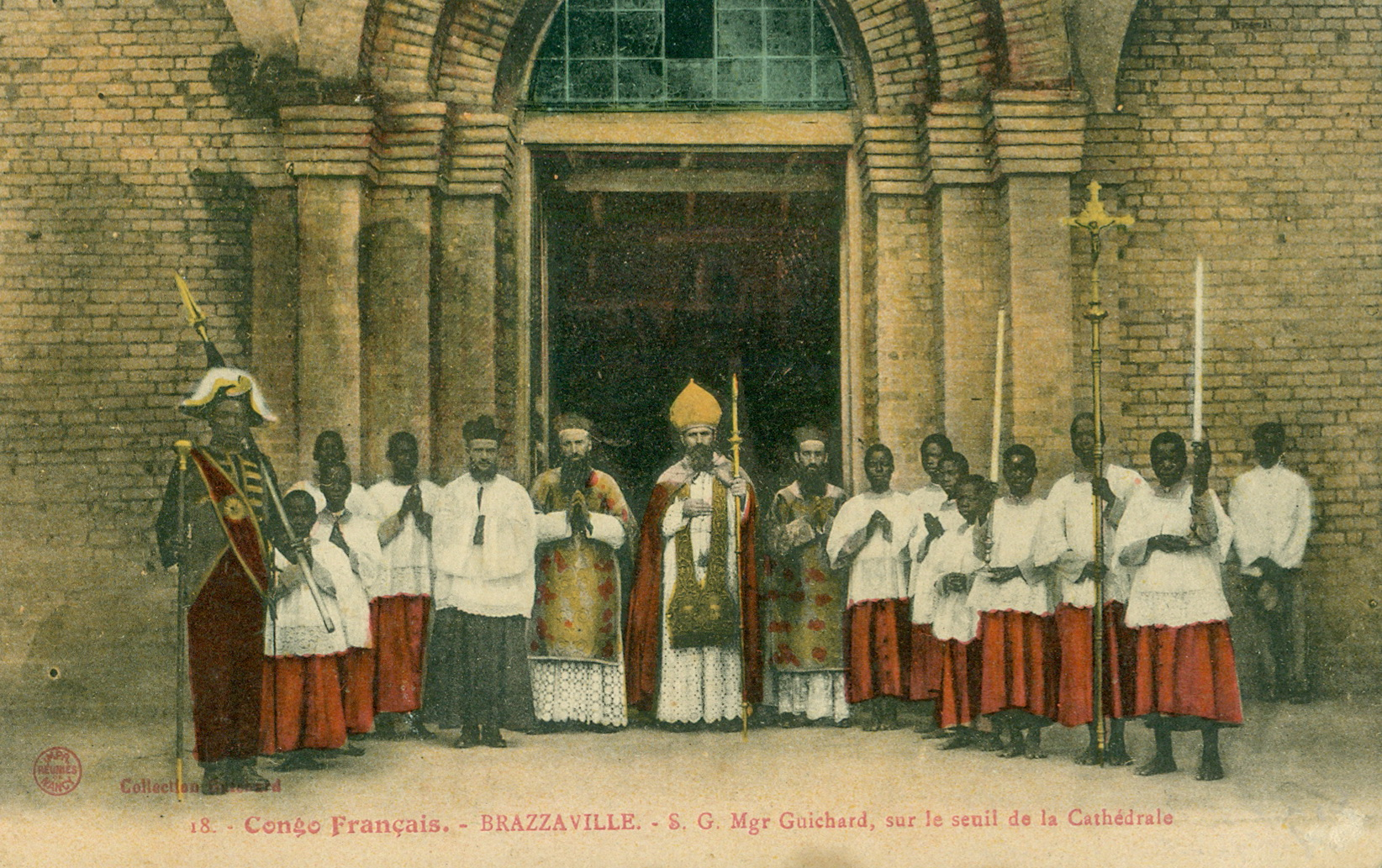
French Postcard from beginning of 20th century: French Congo Brazzaville - S.G Mgr Guichard on the senil of the cathedral

The Sacred Heart Cathedral (French: Cathédrale du Sacré-Cœur de Brazzaville) or simply Cathedral of Brazzaville, is a religious building belonging to the Catholic Church and is located in the city of Brazzaville in the African country of the Republic of Congo.

The church is the seat of the Bishop of the Archdiocese of Brazzaville and is the oldest existing cathedral in central Africa. The building was built in 1892 and consecrated in 1894. The space was renovated in 1952 and 1993. The main entrance faces east and is decorated with two large polychrome statues of St. Paul and St. Peter, dating from before 1914. Charles de Gaulle visited it in 1944 and Pope John Paul II did the same in 1980.

== See also ==
- Roman Catholicism in the Republic of the Congo
- Sacred Heart Cathedral (disambiguation)
