= Argiza =

Greek town

Coordinates: 39°50′37″N 27°24′34″E

Argiza (Ancient Greek: Ἄργιζα) was a Greek town located in ancient Mysia and later in the Byzantine province of Hellespontus. On the Tabula Peutingeriana it is spelled Argesis and placed between Pergamum and Cyzicus. Pliny the Elder notes the town as Erizii and in his day it belonged to the conventus of Adramyttium. In later times it was Christianized and became a bishopric. No longer a residential see, it was restored under the name Algiza by the Roman Catholic Church as a titular see.

Its site is located near Pazarköy in Asiatic Turkey.
