= Raymundo Damasceno Assis =

Brazilian Catholic cardinal (born 1937)

His Eminence Raymundo Damasceno Assis
- Cardinal, Archbishop emeritus of Aparecida
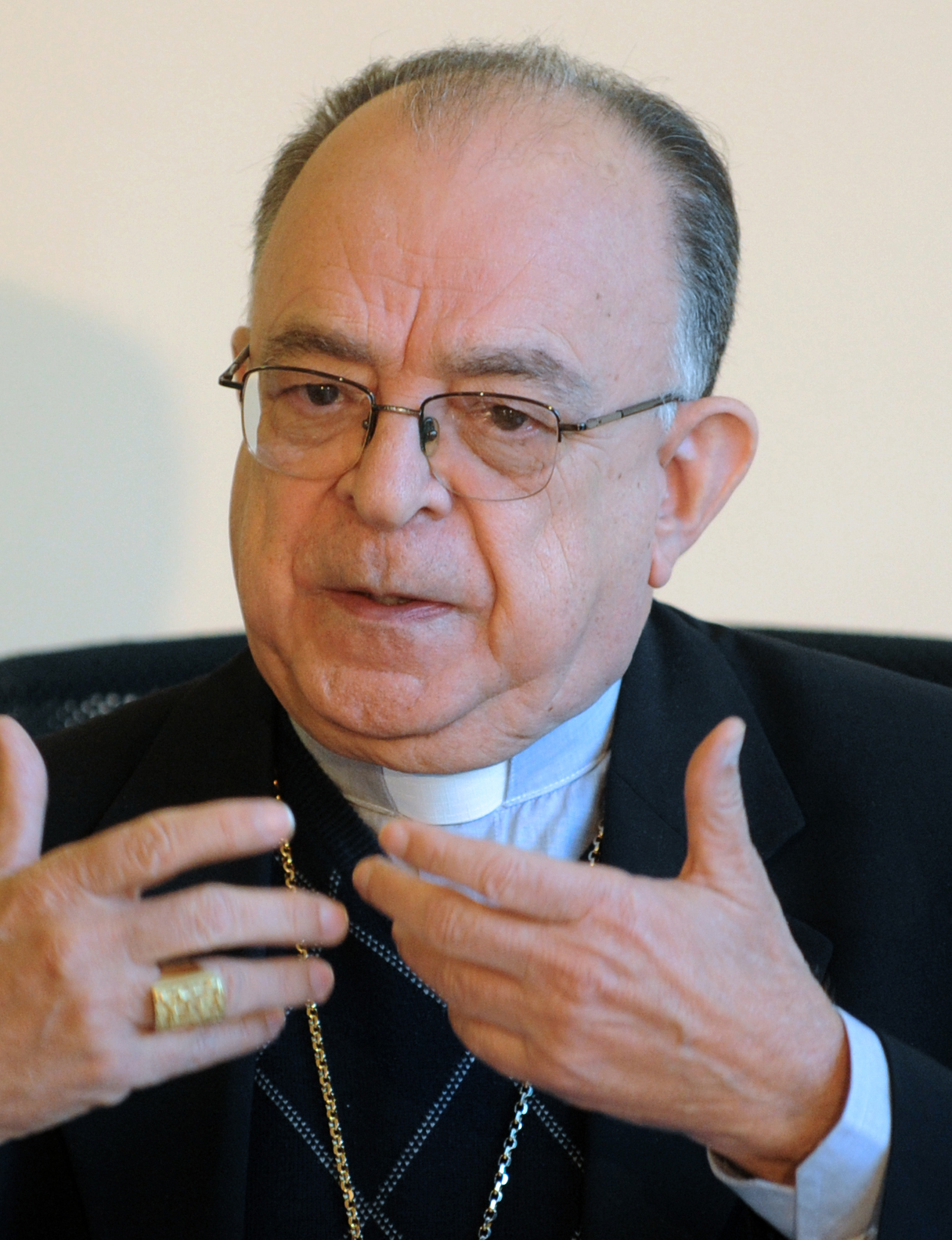
- Archdiocese: Aparecida
- See: Aparecida
- Appointed: 28 July 2004
- Installed: 25 August 2004
- Term ended: 16 November 2016
- Predecessor: Aloísio Lorscheider
- Successor: Orlando Brandes
- Other post: Cardinal-Priest of Immacolata al Tiburtino
- Previous posts: Auxiliary Bishop of Brasília (1986–2004); Titular Bishop of Nova Petra (1986–2004)

Orders
- Ordination: 19 March 1968 by Jose Newton de Almeida Baptista
- Consecration: 15 September 1986 by José Freire Falcão
- Created cardinal: 20 November 2010 by Pope Benedict XVI
- Rank: Cardinal-Priest

Personal details
- Born: Raymundo Damasceno Assis; 15 February 1937 (age 89) Capela Nova, Brazil
- Denomination: Roman Catholic
- Motto: In Gaudiom Domini (In the Joy of the Lord)
- Coat of arms: Raymundo Damasceno Assis's coat of arms

Raymundo Damasceno Assis (Portuguese pronunciation: [ʁajˈmũdu damaˈsenu aˈsis]; born 15 February 1937) is a Brazilian cardinal of the Roman Catholic Church. He was Auxiliary Bishop of Brasília from 1986 to 2004 and Archbishop of Aparecida from 2004 to 2016.

== Biography ==
=== Early life and ordination ===
Damasceno Assis was born 15 February 1937 in Capela Nova. In 1948, he entered the Juvenato São José of the Marist Brothers, in the city of Mendes where he completed his basic elementary education; then he discerned that his vocation was for the priesthood and returned home to Conselheiro Lafaiete, archdiocese of Mariana, where the family had moved. In 1955, he entered the Minor Seminary of the archdiocese of Mariana, where he did his secondary studies; and then the Major Seminary, where he studied philosophy. In 1960, Archbishop Oscar de Oliveira, of Mariana, sent him to the newly established archdiocese of Brasília, as a help to that new local church, inaugurated on 21 April of that same year. In 1961, Brasília's archbishop, sent him to Rome to study theology at the Pontifical Gregorian University, where he obtained a licentiate; he resided at Colegio Pio Brasileiro during those years, the Second Vatican Council was occurring. In 1965, he was sent to Germany, where he concluded his formation at the Superior Institute of Catechesis in Münich. He returned to Brazil in 1968. He did post graduate studies in the philosophy of science at the University of Brasília and at the Pontifical Catholic University of Minas Gerais.

He was ordained a priest on 19 March 1968 in Conselheiro Lafaiete by José Newton de Almeida Baptista, Archbishop of Brasília. In the Archdiocese of Brasília, he served as coordinator of catechesis and pastor of the parish of Santíssimo Sacramento. He was also chancellor and co-founder and professor of the Major Seminary Nossa Senhora de Fatima and professor in the Department of Philosophy of the University of Brasília.

=== Bishop ===
He was appointed titular bishop of Nova Petra and auxiliary bishop of Brasília on 18 June 1986. He received his episcopal consecration on 15 September from José Freire Falcão, Archbishop of Brasilia. He was general secretary of the Episcopal Conference of Latin America (CELAM) from 1991 to 1995 and secretary general of the Episcopal Conference of Brazil from 1995 to 1998 and from 1999 to 2003.

He was named metropolitan Archbishop of Aparecida on 28 January 2004.

In 2007 he was elected to a four-year term as president of the Episcopal Council of Latin America (CELAM).

Styles of Raymundo Damasceno Assis
- Reference style: His Eminence
- Spoken style: Your Eminence
- Religious style: Monsignor
- Informal style: Cardinal
- See: Aparecida

=== Cardinal ===
Benedict XVI made him a cardinal on 20 November 2010, assigning him to the rank of cardinal priest and the title of Immacolata al Tiburtino.

In 2011 he was elected to a four-year term as president of the National Conference of Bishops of Brazil.

He was one of the cardinal electors who participated in the 2013 papal conclave that elected Pope Francis.

Pope Francis accepted his retirement on 16 November 2016 and named Orlando Brandes to succeed him.

Catholic Church titles
Preceded by Carlos Ambrosio Lewis	— TITULAR — Titular Bishop of Nova Petra; 18 June 1986 – 28 January 2004	Succeeded by Raffaello Funghini
Preceded by Óscar Andrés Rodríguez Maradiaga	General Secretary of the Latin American Episcopal Council; 1991 – 1995	Succeeded by Jorge Enrique Jiménez Carvajal
Preceded by Antônio Celso Queiroz	General Secretary of the Brazilian Episcopal Conference; 1995 – 2003	Succeeded by Odilo Pedro Scherer
Preceded by Aloísio Lorscheider	Archbishop of Aparecida; 28 January 2004 − 16 November 2016	Succeeded by Orlando Brandes
Preceded by Francisco Javier Errázuriz Ossa	President of the Latin American Episcopal Council; 12 July 2007 – 19 May 2011	Succeeded by Carlos Aguiar Retes
Preceded by Ernesto Corripio Ahumada	Cardinal-Priest of Immacolata al Tiburtino; 20 November 2010 −	Incumbent
Preceded by Geraldo Lyrio Rocha	President of the Brazilian Episcopal Conference; 10 May 2011 – 20 April 2015	Succeeded by Sérgio da Rocha
Order of precedence
Preceded by Geraldo Alckmin as Vice President of Brazil	Brazilian order of precedence 3rd in line as Brazilian cardinal	Followed by Foreign ambassadors
