= Sacred Heart Cathedral, Moundou =

Coordinates: 8.5671°N 16.0929°E

Sacred Heart Cathedral
- Cathédrale du Sacré-Cœur de Moundou
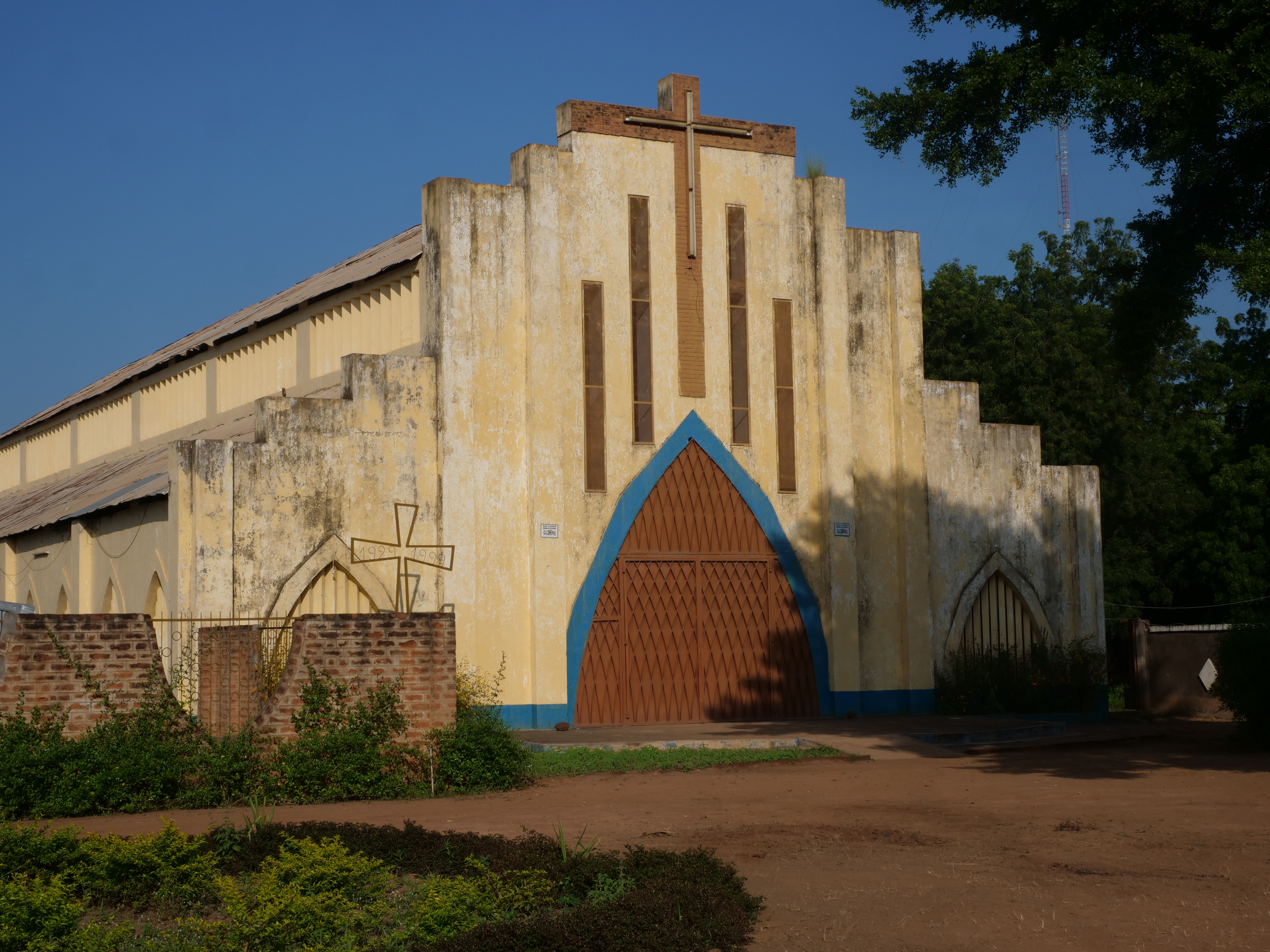
- Sacred Heart Cathedral
- Location: Moundou
- Country: Chad
- Denomination: Roman Catholic Church

The Sacred Heart Cathedral (French: Cathédrale du Sacré-Cœur de Moundou) It is a religious building of the Catholic Church that serves as the seat of the diocese of Moundou in Chad. It is dedicated to the Sacred Heart of Jesus. In the 1950s, his vicar was Bishop Samuel Gaumain. In 1993, its facilities suffered by sectarian unrest. On March 18, 1998, some soldiers entered it during the Mass and brutally detained the priest and the faithful. The construction of the new Cathedral of Moundou were launched in late 1999, in the district of Dombao. Its facilities are home to some Missionaries.

== See also ==
- Roman Catholicism in Chad
- Sacred Heart Cathedral (disambiguation)
