= Orlando Brandes =

21st-century Brazilian Catholic bishop

The Most Reverend Orlando Brandes
- Archbishop Emeritus of Aparecida
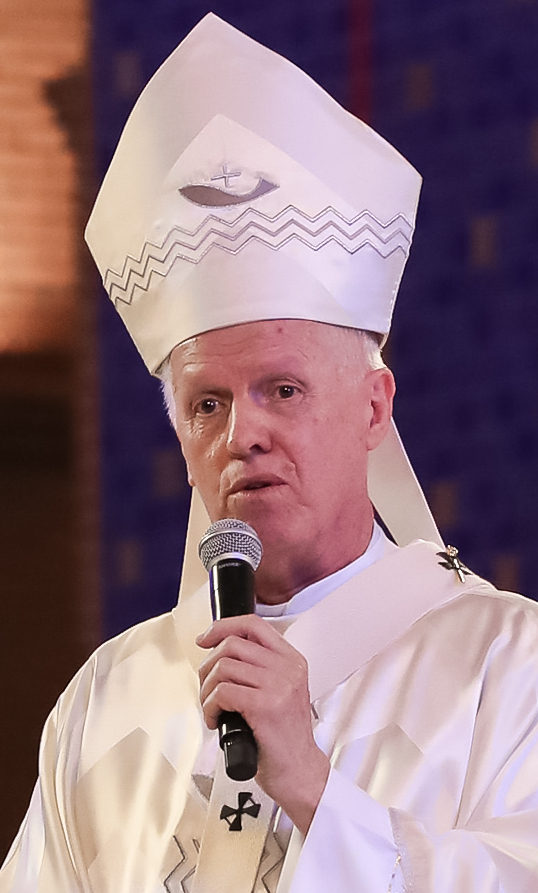
- Orlando Brandes in the Mass of the Day of Our Lady of Aparecida in 2019.
- Church: Catholic Church
- Archdiocese: Aparecida
- Province: São Paulo
- Metropolis: Aparecida
- See: Aparecida
- Appointed: 16 November 2016
- Installed: 21 January 2017
- Predecessor: Raymundo Damasceno Assis
- Successor: Mário Antônio da Silva
- Previous posts: Bishop of Joinville (1994–2006); Archbishop of Londrina (2006-2016)

Orders
- Ordination: 6 July 1974
- Consecration: 5 June 1994 by João Oneres Marchiori
- Rank: Archbishop

Personal details
- Born: Orlando Brandes; 13 April 1946 (age 80) Urubici, Santa Catarina, Brazil
- Denomination: Roman Catholic
- Motto: Somos Operários de Deus (We are God's workers)
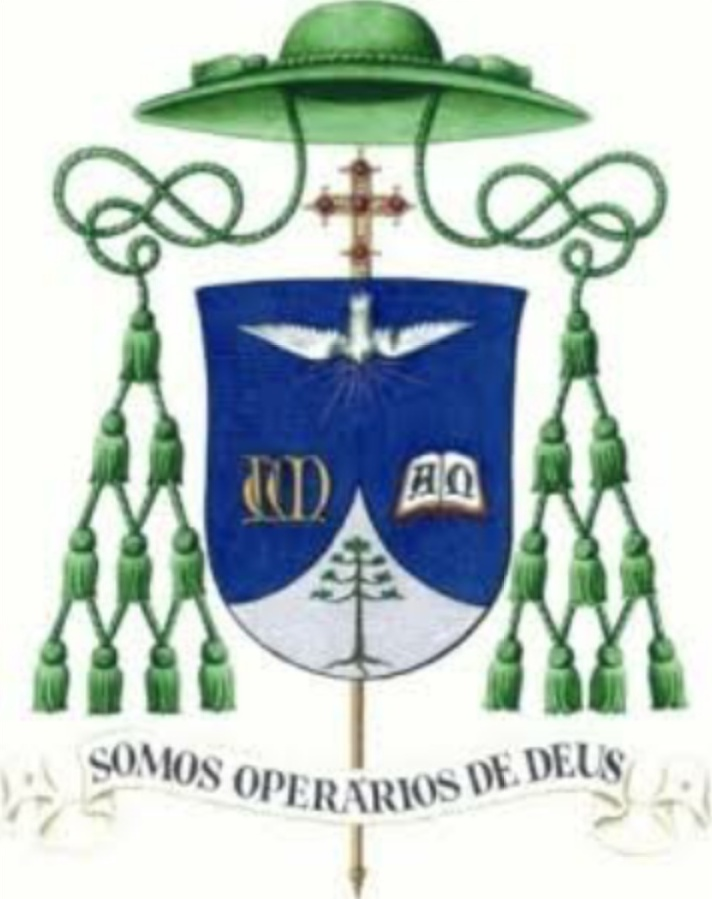
- Coat of arms

Styles of Orlando Brandes
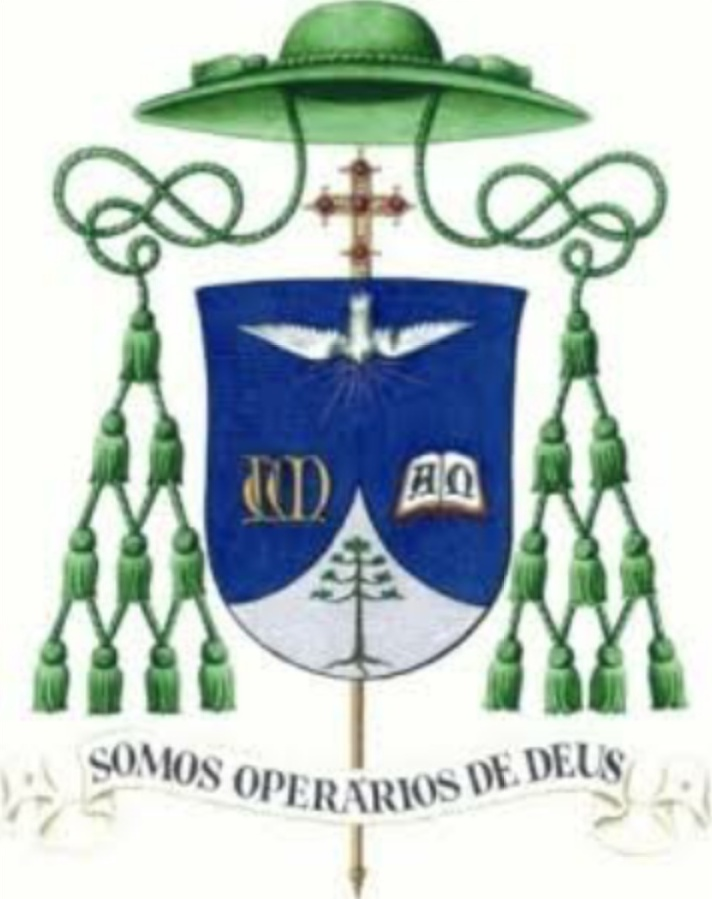
- Reference style: The Most Reverend
- Spoken style: Your Excellency
- Religious style: Archbishop

Orlando Brandes (born 13 April 1946) is a Brazilian prelate of the Catholic Church who was Archbishop of Aparecida from 2017 to 2026. He was Bishop of Joinville from 1994 to 2006 and Archbishop of Londrina from 2006 to 2016.

== Early life ==
Brandes was born on 13 April 1946 in Urubici, Brazil. He completed his primary and secondary studies in Urubici and Lages. He studied Philosophy in Curitiba, then did his theological studies at the Pontifical Gregorian University in Rome. He did post-graduate studies in moral theology in Rome.

Brandes was ordained as a priest on 6 July 1974 in Francisco Beltrão. As a priest, he exercised the following duties: Professor of Theology at the Institute of Theology of Santa Catarina; Rector of the Major Seminary in Florianópolis; Preacher of Spiritual Retreats; Director of the Institute of Theology of Santa Catarina; Member of the Ecclesiastical Court of Florianópolis; lecturer and preacher of missions.

== Bishop and archbishop ==
On 9 March 1994, Pope John Paul II appointed Brandes Bishop of Joinville. He was ordained as a bishop there on 5 June 1994 by bishops João Oneres Marchiori, Eusebio Oscar Scheid, SCI and Gregório Warmeling. He was secretary of the south region of the National Conference of Bishops of Brazil.

On 10 May 2006, Pope Benedict XVI appointed Brandes as Archbishop of Londrina. where he was installed on 23 July.

On 16 November 2016, Pope Francis appointed him Archbishop of Aparecida; he was installed on 21 January 2017.

On October 12, 2019, during the Amazon Synod, he drew national attention for giving a sermon in Aparecida in a Morning Mass condemning what he saw as a "violent" and "unjust" right wing ideology, a "dragon of traditionialism" which he saw as "firing on the Pope [Francis], on the [Amazon] Synod, and the Second Vatican Council" a few hours later, the President of Brazil Jair Bolsonaro, known for being of the political right, went to Mass in the National Shrine of Aparecida at 4 pm and read the biblical text as Reader.

Catholic Church titles
| Preceded by Gregório Warmeling | Bishop of Joinville; 1994-2006 | Succeeded by Ireneu Roque Scherer |
| Preceded by Albano Bortoletto Cavallin | Archbishop of Londrina; 2006-2016 | Succeeded by Geremias Steinmetz |
| Preceded by Raymundo Damasceno Assis | Archbishop of Aparecida; 2016-present | Incumbent |
