= Aloísio Lorscheider =

Brazilian Catholic cardinal (1924–2007)

His Eminence Aloísio Lorscheider O.F.M.
- Archbishop Emeritus of Aparecida
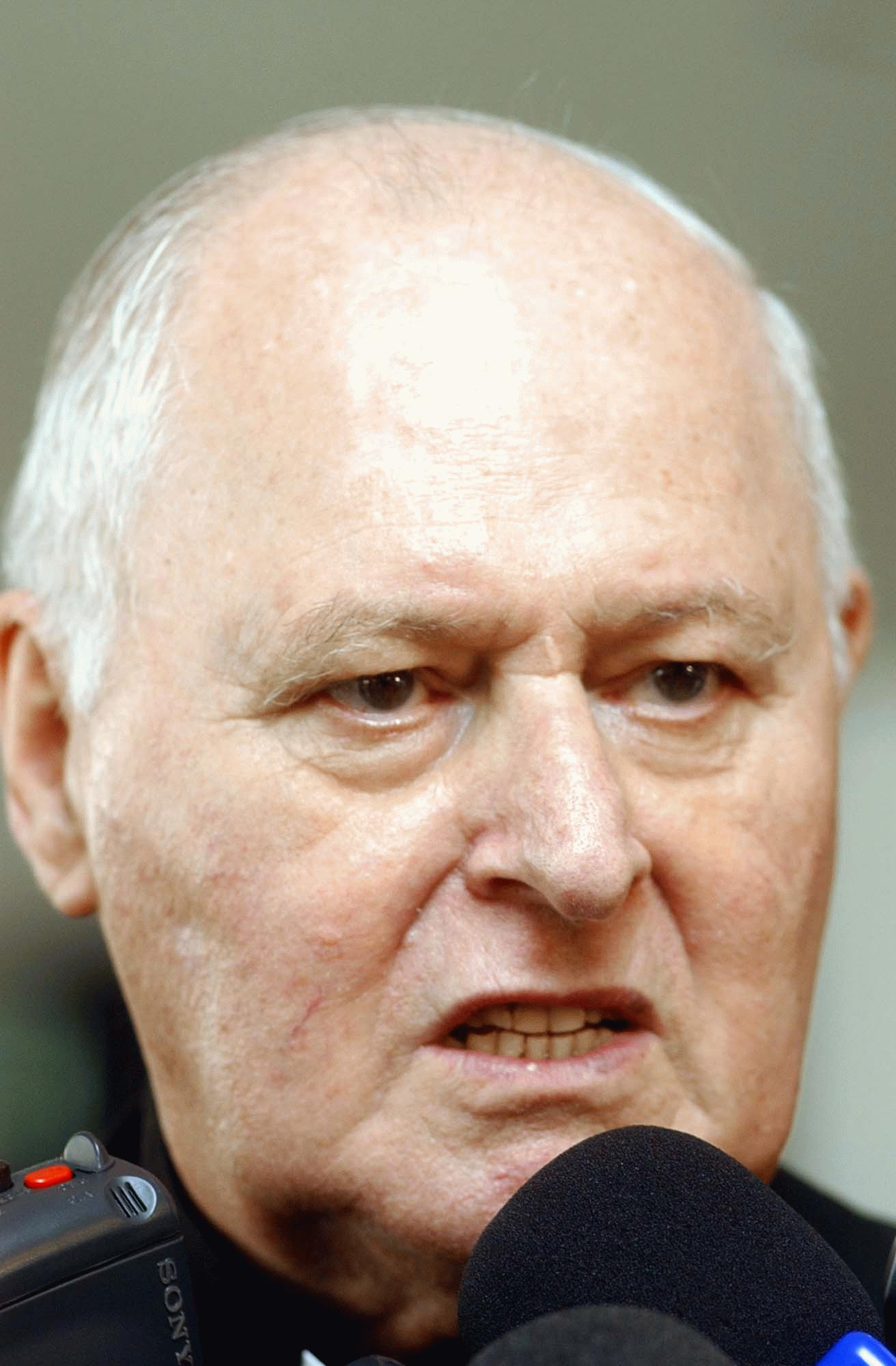
- Cdl. Aloísio Lorscheider.
- Archdiocese: Aparecida
- See: Aparecida
- Appointed: 12 July 1995
- Term ended: 28 July 2004
- Predecessor: Geraldo Penido
- Successor: Raymundo Damasceno
- Other post: Cardinal-Priest of San Pietro in Montorio (1976–2007)
- Previous posts: Bishop of Santo Ângelo (1962–1973); First Vice-President of the Latin American Episcopal Council (1972–1975); Archbishop of Fortaleza (1973–1995); President of Caritas Internationalis (1974–1975); President of the Latin American Episcopal Council (1975–1979)

Orders
- Ordination: 22 August 1948
- Consecration: 20 May 1962 by Alfredo Scherer
- Created cardinal: 24 May 1976 by Pope Paul VI
- Rank: Cardinal-Priest

Personal details
- Born: Aloísio Leo Arlindo Lorscheider; 8 October 1924 Estrela, Rio Grande do Sul, Brazil
- Died: 23 December 2007 (aged 83) Porto Alegre, Rio Grande do Sul, Brazil
- Denomination: Catholic
- Motto: In cruce salus et vita

Styles of Aloísio Lorscheider
- Reference style: His Eminence
- Spoken style: Your Eminence
- Informal style: Cardinal

Aloísio Leo Arlindo Lorscheider, O.F.M. (8 October 1924 – 23 December 2007) was a Brazilian Catholic cardinal prominent during the 1970s and 1980s. He was known as an advocate of liberation theology in the 1970s and was seen by some observers as a serious candidate for the papacy in the two conclaves of 1978.

== Early life and ordination ==
Lorscheider was of German descent, born in Estrela, Rio Grande do Sul, Brazil. He entered the local Franciscan minor seminary of Taquari at the age of nine years. He began his novitiate in December 1942 and was ordained as a priest on 22 August 1948.

== Professor and bishop ==
Lorscheider taught a number of subjects, such as German, mathematics, and Latin, but it was not long before he went to Rome to study dogmatic theology. Lorscheider received his doctorate in 1952, and returned to Brazil to teach that same subject at the Franciscan Seminary of Divinopolis. In 1958, Lorscheider was called back to Rome to teach, and in 1962 made bishop of Santo Ângelo. Lorscheider attended the Second Vatican Council between 1962 and 1965, and he was named Archbishop of Fortaleza in the northeastern state of Ceará in 1973. After the first meeting between Church and Freemasonry which had been held on 11 April 1969 at the convent of the Divine Master in Ariccia, he was the protagonist of a series of public handshakes between high prelates of the Roman Catholic Church and the heads of Freemasonry.

== Cardinal ==
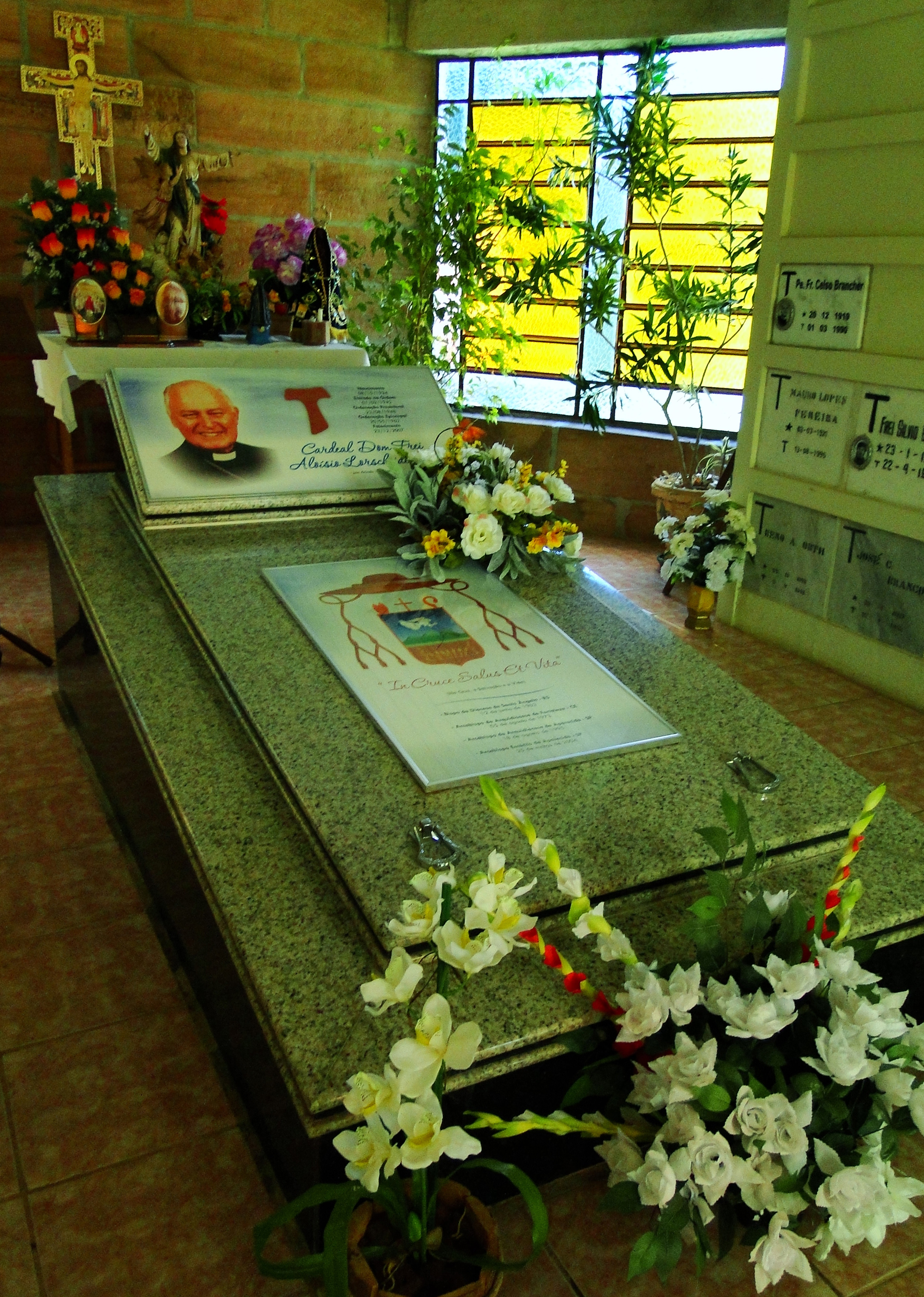
Cardinal Lorscheider's tomb

As Lorscheider grew in popularity with his flock and his ability as a prelate was recognised, Pope Paul VI gave him a cardinal's hat in May 1976, becoming Cardinal-Priest of San Pietro in Montorio. Although at the time he was the fourth-youngest cardinal in the college, Lorscheider already doubted his own health; however, some oddsmakers with Ladbrokes (who had him at odds of 33 to 1) considered him a serious papabile in the August 1978 conclave. Lorscheider headed the National Conference of Brazilian Bishops from 1971 to 1978. He led the Latin American Episcopal Conference in 1976.

In 1995, Pope John Paul II named Lorscheider Archbishop of Aparecida in São Paulo State. He resigned the pastoral government of the Aparecida archdiocese at the beginning of 2004. It is also thought Lorscheider was one of the most vital supporters of Albino Luciani's rise to the papacy, and also of Karol Wojtyła's in the October 1978 conclave.

After the death of John Paul II in 2005, Lorscheider said that the European cardinals' "sense of superiority" would not allow them to elect a non-European pope. In poor health and ineligible to vote because he was over the age of 80, he did not attend the pre-conclave discussions at the 2005 conclave that elected Joseph Ratzinger to succeed John Paul II.

=== Liberation theology ===
Lorscheider defended Leonardo Boff when that theologian was brought to heel by Ratzinger in the 1980s, and continued his strong social activism, being jailed briefly in 1993 as a result of participating in a protest against government policy. With the crackdown on dissent in the John Paul II papacy, especially after Ratzinger became prefect of the Congregation for the Doctrine of the Faith in 1981, Lorscheider found himself opposing brother cardinals whom he had been very firmly associated with during the papacy of Pope Paul VI.

During his Church career, Lorscheider developed his outspoken stance on the appalling poverty that blighted the region. He believed that the Church was obliged to take a firm stand against this poverty and his hard-working and personable character allowed him to develop links with the poor that he observed to be lacking in previous generations of priests. He was a vehement critic of the Brazilian military dictatorship and its torture of political opponents, and favoured a flexible approach to church structure.

== Death ==
Lorscheider died on 23 December 2007 in Porto Alegre after a long hospitalization.
