= Archdiocese of Aparecida =

Catholic ecclesiastical territory

Coordinates: 22.8425°S 45.2308°W

Metropolitan Archdiocese of Aparecida Archidioecesis Metropolitae Apparitiopolitana Arquidiocese Metropolitano de Aparecida

Catholic
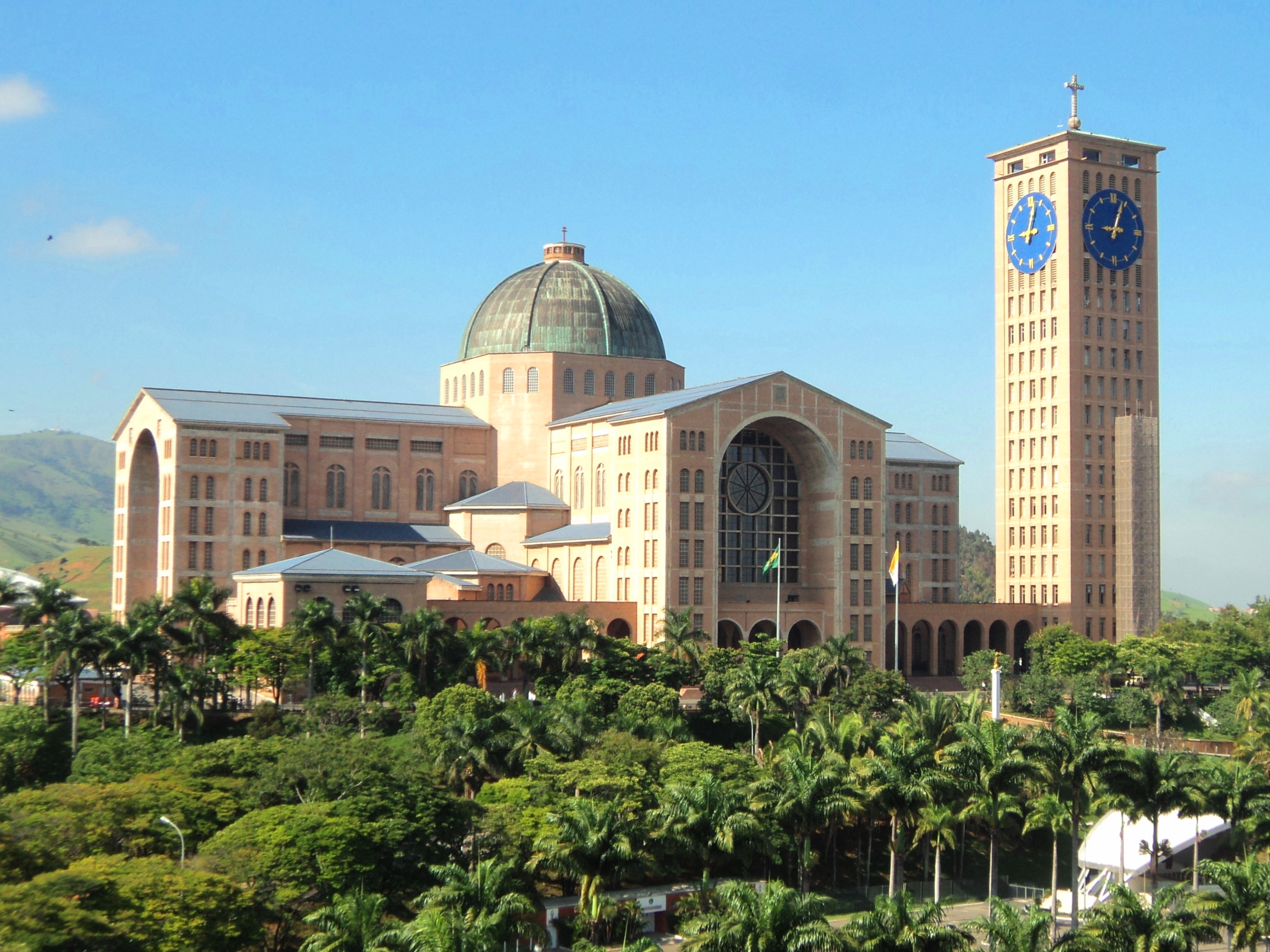
- Cathedral Basilica and National Shrine of Our Lady of Conception Aparecida

- Coat of arms

Location
- Country: Brazil
- Ecclesiastical province: Aparecida

Statistics
- Area: 1,300 km^{2} (500 sq mi)
- Population: Total; Catholics: (as of 2018); 195,511; 164,040 (▲83.9%%)

Information
- Sui iuris church: Latin Church
- Rite: Roman Rite
- Established: 19 April 1958 (68 years ago)
- Cathedral: Cathedral Basilica and National Shrine of Our Lady of Conception Aparecida
- Patron saint: Our Lady Aparecida

Current leadership
- Pope: Leo XIV
- Metropolitan Archbishop: Mário Antônio da Silva
- Bishops emeritus: Orlando Brandes; Raymundo Damasceno Assis

Map
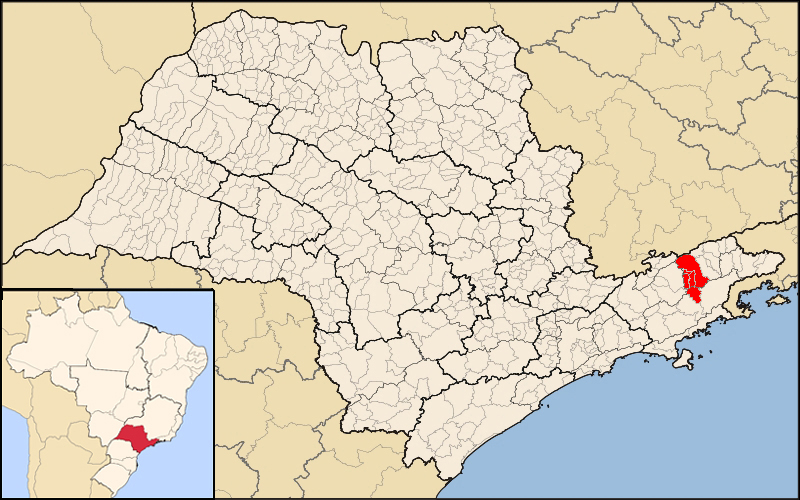

Website
- www.arquidioceseaparecida.org.br

The Roman Catholic Metropolitan Archdiocese of Aparecida (Latin: Archidioecesis Metropolitae Apparitiopolitana) is an archdiocese located in the city of Aparecida in Brazil.

== History ==
- 19 April 1958: Established as Metropolitan Archdiocese of Aparecida from the Metropolitan Archdiocese of São Paulo and Diocese of Taubaté

== Bishops ==
=== Metropolitan Archbishops of Aparecida ===
- Cardinal Carlos Carmelo de Vasconcelos Motta (1964–1982)
- Geraldo María de Morais Penido (1982–1995)
- Cardinal Aloísio Lorscheider, O.F.M. (1995–2004)
- Cardinal Raymundo Damasceno Assis (2004–2016)
- Orlando Brandes (2016–2026)
- Mário Antônio da Silva (2026–present)

=== Coadjutor archbishops ===
- Antônio Ferreira de Macedo, C.SS.R. (1964-1977); did not succeed to see
- Geraldo María de Morais Penido (1977-1982)

=== Auxiliary bishop ===
- Darci José Nicioli, C.SS.R. (2012-2016), appointed Archbishop of Diamantina, Minas Gerais

== Suffragan dioceses ==
- Diocese of Caraguatatuba
- Diocese of Lorena
- Diocese of São José dos Campos
- Diocese of Taubaté

== Sources ==
- Catholic Hierarchy
