= Jalo =

Jalo may refer to:

- Jalo Oasis in Libya
- Jalu, a city in the oasis
- Jalo (name), a Finnish given name and surname (including a list of people with the name)

== See also ==
- Jaloo, Khyber Pakhtunkhwa, a village in Pakistan
- Jalo Bhati, a village in Punjab, India
- Jallo Park, in Punjab, Pakistan
