= Jaloo =

Jaloo may refer to:

- Jaloo, Libya, a city in Libya
  - Jalo oasis
- Jaloo, Mansehra, a Union Council in Mansehra district, Pakistan
- Jaloo (singer), Brazilian singer-songwriter

== See also ==
- Jalo (name), a Finnish given name and surname
