= José Luis Azcona Hermoso =

Brazilian Roman Catholic prelate (1940–2024)

His Excellency José Luis Azcona Hermoso
- Prelate Emeritus of Marajó
- Church: Catholic Church
- Archdiocese: Belém do Pará
- Diocese: Marajó
- Appointed: 16 February 1987
- Term ended: 1 June 2016
- Predecessor: Alquilio Alvarez Diez
- Successor: Evaristo Pascoal Spengler

Orders
- Ordination: 21 December 1963
- Consecration: 5 April 1987 by Alberto Gaudêncio Ramos

Personal details
- Born: 28 March 1940 Pamplona, Spain
- Died: 20 November 2024 (aged 84) Belém, Pará, Brazil
- Denomination: Roman Catholic
- Residence: Belém, Pará, Brazil
- Motto: In Nomine Domini
- Coat of arms: José Luis Azcona Hermoso's coat of arms

Styles of José Luis Azcona Hermoso
- Reference style: His Excellency
- Spoken style: Your Excellency
- Religious style: Bishop

José Luis Azcona Hermoso (28 March 1940 – 20 November 2024) was a Brazilian Roman Catholic prelate who was bishop of the Territorial Prelature of Marajó from 1987 to 2016. Born in Pamplona, he was ordained a priest of the Order of Augustinian Recollects in 1963 and was appointed prelate of Marajó by Pope John Paul II in 1987.

Catholic Church titles
Preceded by Alquilio Alvarez Diez	Prelate of Marajó; 1987–2016	Succeeded by Evaristo Pascoal Spengler
