= Diocese of Abaetetuba =

Catholic ecclesiastical territory

Coordinates: 1.7230°S 48.8876°W

Diocese of Abaetetuba Dioecesis Abaëtetubensis Diocese de Abaetetuba

Catholic

Location
- Country: Brazil
- Ecclesiastical province: Belém do Pará
- Metropolitan: Belém do Pará

Statistics
- Area: 28,256 km^{2} (10,910 sq mi)
- Population: Total; Catholics: (as of 2022); 669,878; 334,438 (49.9%)

Information
- Rite: Roman Rite
- Established: 4 August 1981 (45 years ago)
- Cathedral: Cathedral of Our Lady of the Immaculate Conception in Abaetetuba

Current leadership
- Pope: Leo XIV
- Bishop: José Maria Chaves dos Reis
- Metropolitan Archbishop: Júlio Endi Akamine

The Roman Catholic Diocese of Abaetetuba (Latin: Dioecesis Abaëtetubensis) is a diocese located in the city of Abaetetuba in the ecclesiastical province of Belém do Pará in Brazil.

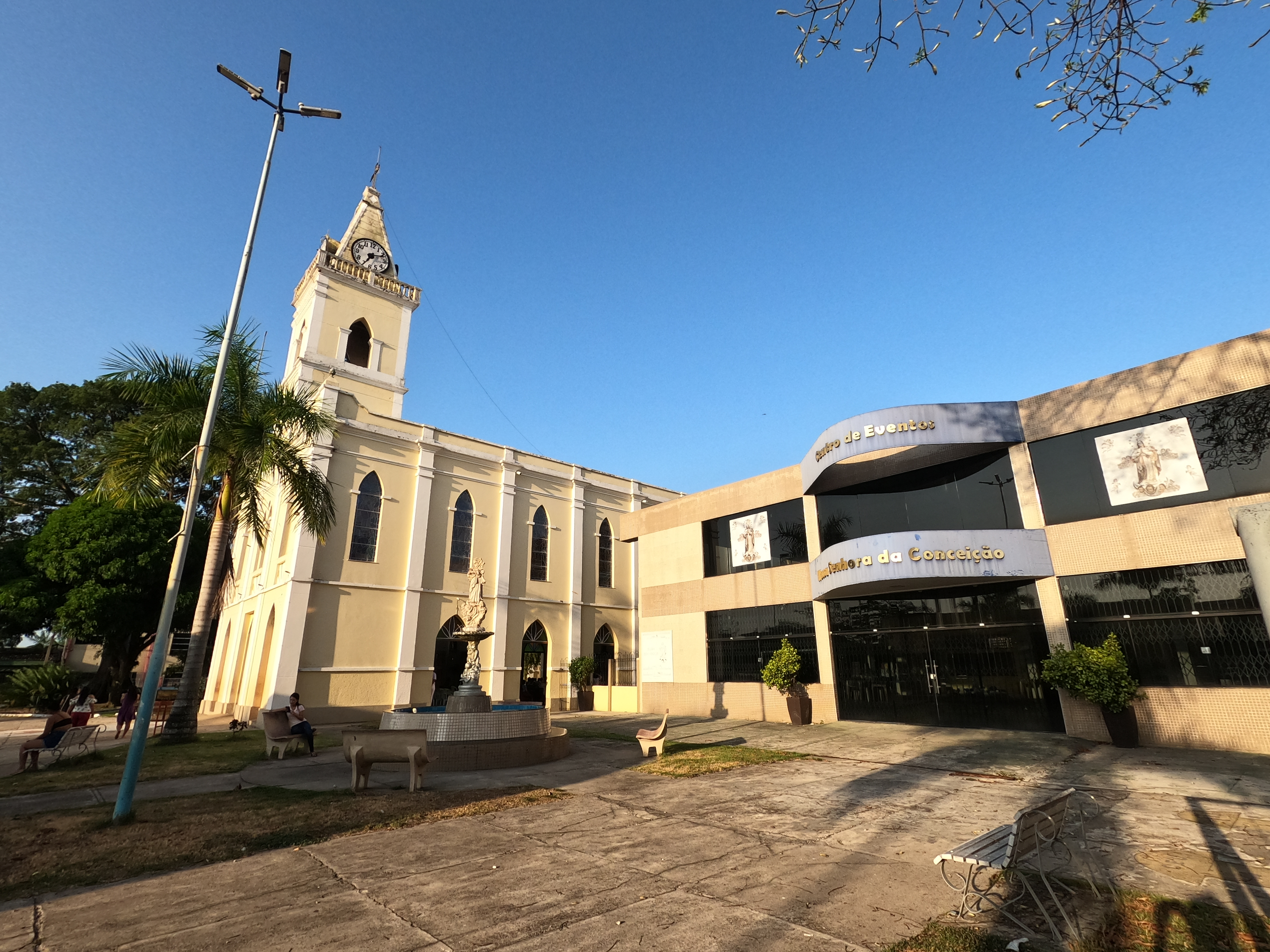

== History ==
- 25 November 1961: Established as Territorial Prelature of Abaeté do Tocantins from Metropolitan Archdiocese of Belém do Pará
- 4 August 1981: Promoted as Diocese of Abaetetuba

== Leadership ==
- Prelates of Abaeté do Tocantins (Latin Church)
  - Giovanni Gazza (12 November 1962 – 19 September 1966)
- Bishops of Abaetetuba (Latin Church)
  - Angelo Frosi, S.X. (2 February 1970 – 28 June 1995)
  - Flávio Giovenale, S.D.B. (8 October 1997 – 16 December 2012); transferred to be Bishop of Santarem
  - José Maria Chaves dos Reis (2013.07.03 -

== Churches ==
- Our Lady of the Conception Cathedral, Abaetetuba
