= Samuel Wallace MacDowell III =

Brazilian military man, magistrate, politician and journalist

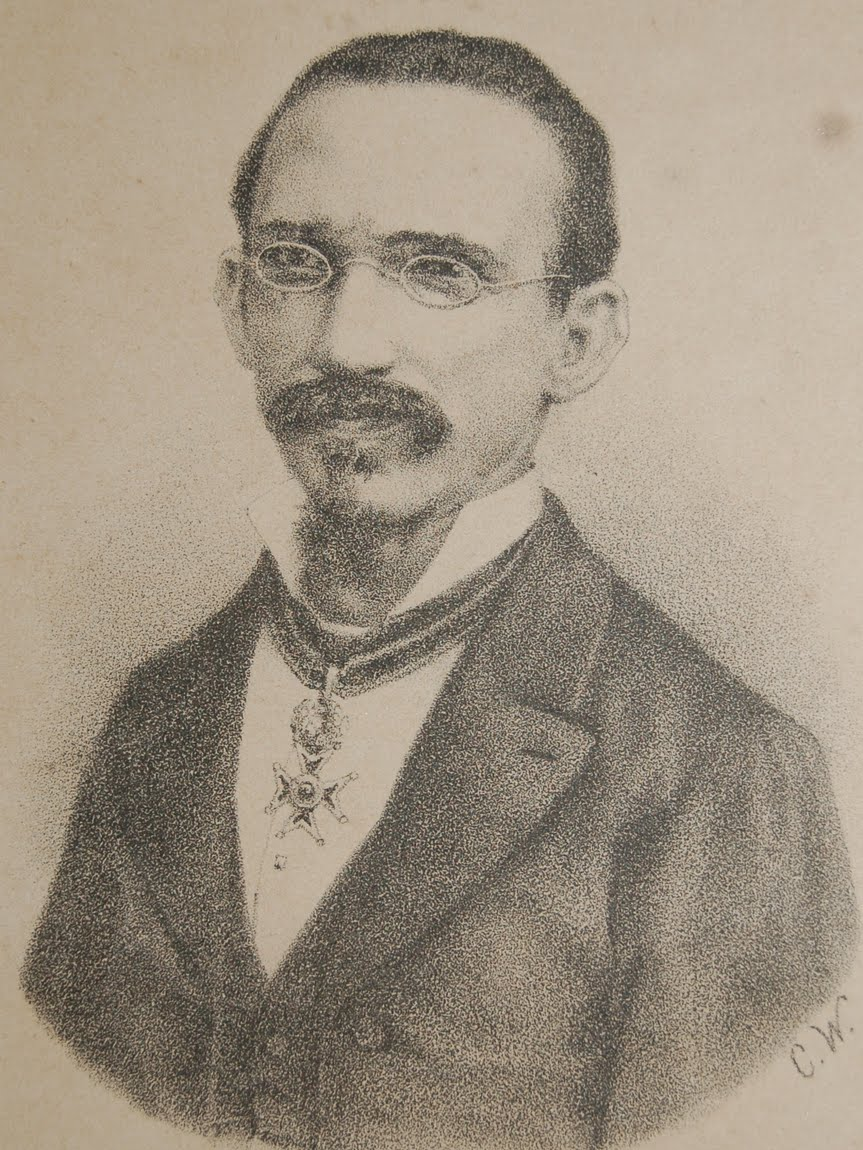
Counsellor MacDowell

Samuel Wallace MacDowell III (May 26, 1843 – August 16, 1908) was a Brazilian soldier, magistrate, politician, journalist, and a leading voice in the abolitionist movement of Brazil.

== Biography ==
=== Early life and education ===
Son of a homonym father, Samuel Wallace MacDowell II (graduated from Olinda Law School) and Maria Vivência Clara de Sá, was the grandson of a homonym Scottish merchant and attaché to the British empire in the State of Pará. He was orphaned by his father and mother, one year and eight months old along with his sister, and taken to Pará to be raised by his grandmother Marie Checks, who was originally from Martinique. In 1860 he was assigned to the Third Artillery Battalion, however due to health problems, he could not continue his career and joined the Faculty of Law of Recife, while teaching in local colleges.

He graduated in 1867, returning to Belém as a magistrate. He soon joined the Liberal Party, in addition to working as a journalist in the Jornal Amazonas and in the Liberal do Pará, and he also founded the A Regeneração.

=== Family ===
In 1869, MacDowell married Ana Augusta da Gama e Costa, daughter of Francisco Antônio da Costa. They had nine children: Anna, who married the industrialist Carlos Brício da Costa; Samuel, layer, married to Dolores do Rêgo Barros; Afonso, doctor, married to Emília de La Rocque; José Maria, layer and journalist, married to Georgina Cunha, Francisco, priest; Maria Vivência, married with magistrate and deputy Antônio dos Passos Miranda; Frederico Luis, doctor, married to Síliva Paranhos; Defina and Sara, both sisters in the Congregation of the Blessed Sacrament in Paris.

=== Career ===
He was elected provincial deputy in 1881, then in the Conservative Party, and then general deputy between 1886 and 1889. MacDowell got appointed as Minister of Navy in the cabinet of Baron of Cotegipe in 1886 when the Naval School was established. After 11 months he was transferred to become Minister of Justice.

MacDowell was awarded on June 12, 1886 the title of Counsellor of the Empire by Dom Pedro II. MacDowell appointed the first commission to deal with the creation of Brazil's Civil Code. MacDowell also provided basic reforms in Brazil's correctional and detention facilities, in addition to having defended Bishop Antônio de Macedo Costa during the Religious Question in the 1870s.

He was invited by Ruy Barbosa and Lauro Sodré to participate in Brazil's proclamation of the republic. MacDowell declined, declaring himself defeated, but not convinced. After the fall of the Brazilian empire, MacDowell went to Belém do Pará to deal with personal and family affairs. MacDowell assisted in the elaboration of the state's constitution, and was president of the commission responsible for establishing the boundaries between the state of Pará and the new state of Amazonas.

MacDowell left Brazil in self-exile with his wife Ana Augusta and their three younger children. MacDowell established himself in Paris where he lived a frugal lifestyle, giving classes to provide for his family's livelihood. While in Paris he maintained his bond of friendship and loyalty he always had to Dom Pedro II and the Brazilian imperial family.
