= Diocese of Castanhal =

Catholic ecclesiastical territory

Coordinates: 1.2929°S 47.9432°W

Diocese of Castanhal Dioecesis Castagnalensis de Pará Diocese de Castanhal

Catholic

Location
- Country: Brazil
- Ecclesiastical province: Belém do Pará
- Metropolitan: Belém do Pará

Statistics
- Area: 14,338 km^{2} (5,536 sq mi)
- Population: Total; Catholics: (as of 2023); 820,653; 668,000 (81.4%)
- Parishes: 36

Information
- Rite: Latin Rite
- Established: 29 December 2004 (21 years ago)
- Cathedral: Cathedral of Mary Mother of God in Castanhal, Pará

Current leadership
- Pope: Leo XIV
- Bishop: Manoel de Oliveira Soares Filho
- Metropolitan Archbishop: Júlio Endi Akamine

Website
- Blog of the Diocese

The Roman Catholic Diocese of Castanhal (Latin: Dioecesis Castagnalensis de Pará) is a diocese located in the city of Castanhal in the ecclesiastical province of Belém do Pará in Brazil.

== History ==
- December 29, 2004: Established as Diocese of Castanhal from the Metropolitan Archdiocese of Belém do Pará and Diocese of Bragança do Pará

== Leadership ==
- Bishops of Castanhal (Roman rite)
  - Bishop Carlos Verzeletti (29 December 2004 – 24 March 2026)
  - Bishop Manoel de Oliveira Soares Filho (24 March 2026 – present)

== Sources ==
- GCatholic.org
- Catholic Hierarchy
