= Diocese of Cametá =

Latin Catholic ecclesiastical territory in Brazil

Coordinates: 2.2430°S 49.4983°W

Diocese of Cametá Dioecesis Cametanensis Diocese de Cametá

Location
- Country: Brazil
- Ecclesiastical province: Belém do Pará

Statistics
- Area: 47,758 km^{2} (18,439 sq mi)
- Population: Total; Catholics: (as of 2023); 559,000; 412,000 (73.7%)
- Parishes: 20

Information
- Denomination: Catholic Church
- Sui iuris church: Latin Church
- Rite: Roman Rite
- Established: 29 November 1952 (73 years ago)
- Cathedral: Cathedral of St John the Baptist in Cametá

Current leadership
- Pope: Leo XIV
- Bishop: Ivanildo Oliveira Almeida
- Metropolitan Archbishop: Júlio Endi Akamine

The Diocese of Cametá (Latin: Cametanensis) is a Latin Church ecclesiastical territory or diocese of the Catholic Church in Brazil's Pará state.

Its cathedral is Catedral São João Batista (Sant John the Baptist), and is in the episcopal see of Cametá. The Diocese of Cametá is a suffragan diocese in the ecclesiastical province of the metropolitan Archbishop of Belém do Pará

== History ==
On November 29, 1952, the Territorial Prelature of Cametá was established on territory split off from the Metropolitan Roman Catholic Archdiocese of Belém do Pará, its present Metropolitan.

On February 6, 2013, Pope Benedict XVI promoted the Territorial Prelature to Diocese, and named its last Prelate, Bishop Jesús María Cizaurre Berdonces, O.A.R., as the first Bishop.

== Bishops ==
=== Ordinaries ===
Territorial Prelates of Cametá

- Apostolic Administrator Cornélio Veerman, Congregation of the Mission (Lazarists, Vincentians) (C.M.) ( 1953.05.03 – 1961.02.27 see below)
- Bishop-prelate Cornélio Veerman, C.M., Titular Bishop of Numida (1961.02.27 – 1970.11.30) (see above 1961.02.27 – 1969.08.08)
- Bishop-prelate José Elias Chaves Júnior, C.M. (1980.05.21 – 1999.09.29)
- Bishop-prelate Jesús María Cizaurre Berdonces, Augustinian Recollects (O.A.R.) (2000.02.23 – 2013.02.06 see below)

Bishops of Cametá

- Bishop Jesús María Cizaurre Berdonces, O.A.R. (see above 2013.02.06 – 2016.08.17)
- Bishop José Altevir da Silva, C.S.Sp. (2017.09.27 – 2022.03.09)
- Bishop Ivanildo Oliveira Almeida (2023.04.12 – present)

=== Other priest of this diocese who became bishop ===
- José Maria Chaves dos Reis, appointed Bishop of Abaetetuba, Para in 2013

== Sources and external links ==
- GCatholic.org, with incumbent biography links
- Catholic Hierarchy
