= Antônio de Almeida Lustosa =

Venerable Antônio de Almeida Lustosa SDB
- Titular Archbishop Emeritus of Velebusdus
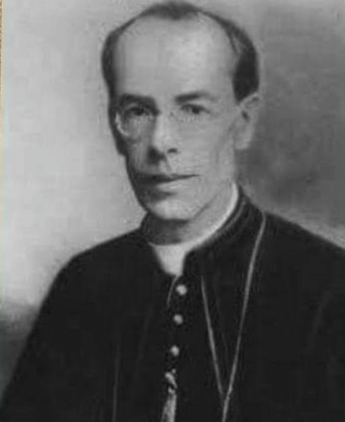
- Church: Roman Catholic Church
- Appointed: 16 February 1963
- Term ended: 16 March 1971
- Predecessor: Aston Sebastian Joseph Chichester
- Successor: Eugène Klein
- Previous posts: Bishop of Uberaba (1924-28); Bishop of Corumbá (1928-31); Archbishop of Belém do Pará (1931-41); Archbishop of Fortaleza (1941-63)

Orders
- Ordination: 28 January 1912 by Eoaminondas Nunes de Ávila e Silva
- Consecration: 11 February 1925 by Helvécio Gomes de Oliveira

Personal details
- Born: Antônio de Almeida Lustosa; 11 February 1886 São João del Rei, Minas Gerais, Brazil
- Died: 14 August 1974 (aged 88) Carpina, Pernambuco, Brazil
- Motto: Latin: Sub umbra alarum tuarum "Under the shadow of Your wings"
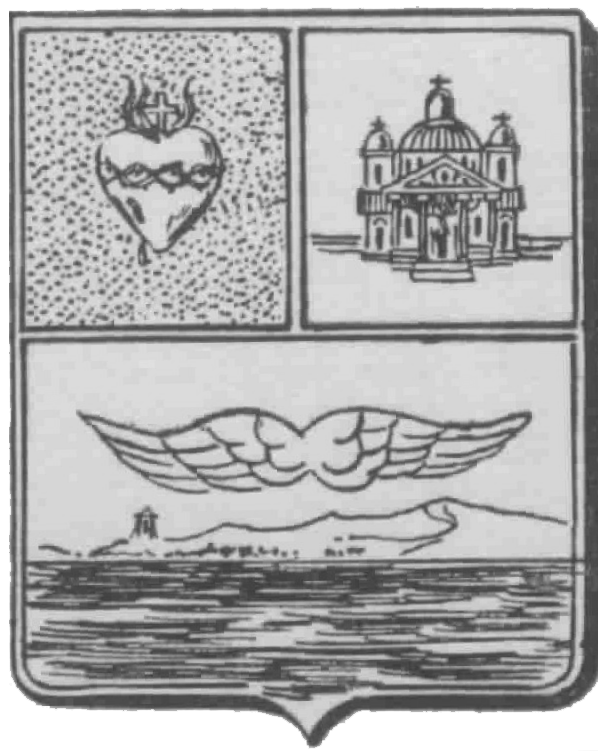
- Coat of arms: Antônio de Almeida Lustosa's coat of arms

Ordination history of Antônio de Almeida Lustosa
History
Priestly ordination
- Ordained by: Eoaminondas Nunes de Ávila e Silva
Episcopal consecration
- Principal consecrator: Helvécio Gomes de Oliveira
- Co-consecrators: Manuel Gomes de Oliveira; Benedito Paulo Alves de Souza
Episcopal succession
Bishops consecrated by Antônio de Almeida Lustosa as principal consecrator
- Raimundo de Castro e Silva: 15 August 1950
- Expedito Eduardo de Oliveira: 13 December 1953
- Vicente de Paulo Araújo Matos: 11 June 1955
- Ladislau Paz: 12 October 1955

Antônio de Almeida Lustosa (11 February 1886 - 14 August 1974) was a Brazilian religious priest of the Salesians of Don Bosco and a prelate in the Roman Catholic Church. Lustosa served in two dioceses and two archdioceses in his career where he was reputed for his holiness and his learning. He introduced a range of innovations from media to new parishes and seminaries in order to restore his dioceses and archdioceses. He was a constant evangelizer and was also an author who wrote children's literature and music in addition to hagiographical and theological works. Lustosa was still a reluctant bishop but accepted each new position in obedience. His health forced him to retire in 1963 and he still remained a noted pastor following his resignation.

His reputation for holiness had been noted while he served in his dioceses and archdioceses and steps were taken in order to initialize a beatification process. The cause opened in 1992; Pope Francis named im as venerable on 22 June 2023.

== Life ==
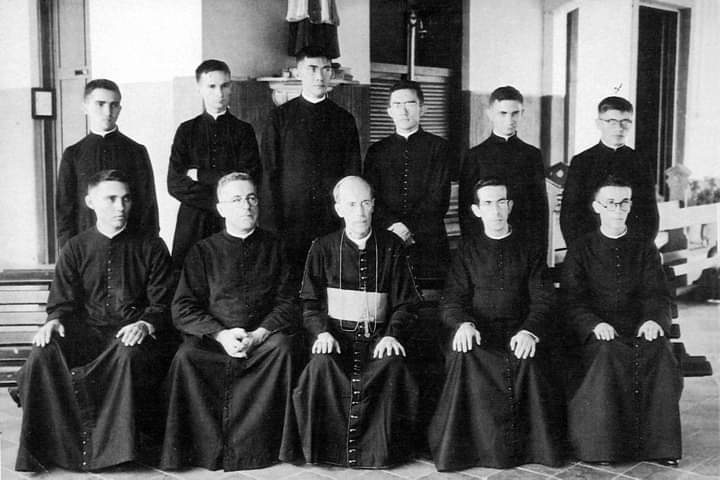
Lustosa and the group of priests of 1942

Antônio de Almeida Lustosa was born in the Minas Gerais province in 1886 as one of ten children to João Baptist Lustosa and Delfina de Almeida. His father planted coconut palms on his farm for each child that God gave him and his wife.

In November 1895 the papers reported the death of the Salesian bishop Luigi Lasagna. This was the first time he ever heard of a Salesian but this became imprinted in his mind. From 1902 Lustosa studied at the Salesian-run college of Cachoreira do Campo. In 1904 he had become so fascinated with the Salesian spirit that he asked his parents if he could enter the order. His parents gave him their blessing after his father asked if that was what his son wanted. In 1905 he entered the order to commence his novitiate. He made his profession into the order on 28 January 1906. Following his 1912 ordination he taught philosophical and theological studies for a brief period before serving as a novice master for seminarians. Ladislao Paz said of him: "Antônio Lustosa was a true saint".

From 1913 to 1914 he was in Jaboatão dos Guararapes and then as novice master in Lorraine from 1915 to 1916. He also served as novice master in Lavrinhas from 1916 to 1922. From 1923 to 1924 he was stationed in Bagé. In 1916 he was moved to Lavrinhas since the novitiate had been moved there where he still remained the novice master. In 1924 he learnt that Pope Pius XI had appointed him as the Bishop of Uberaba and decided to refuse the nomination. But he accepted after the apostolic nuncio Enrico Gasparri urged him to accept at the beginning of 1925.

Lustosa himself set the date for his episcopal consecration in order to remind him of the presence of the Madonna in his life to commemorate the feast of Nossa Senhora de Lourdes whose feast he himself was born on. He was enthroned in Uberaba on 1 March 1925 in the rain following months of drought and heat. His first circular letter in Uberaba consecrated the diocese to the Sacred Heart in addition to making the determination that all parishes must expose the Blessed Sacrament once per week for adoration and to foster deeper devotion to the Eucharist. He later devoted his 21st circular to Thérèse of Lisieux and later presented each parish with a statue of her to be placed somewhere.

He was later appointed to the Corumbá diocese and was enthroned in Corumbá on 28 December 1929. He was later appointed the Archbishop of Belém do Pará and was enthroned in Belém do Pará on 15 December 1931. It was in his archdiocese that he founded the archdiocesan newspaper called "The Word" and it would also feature a particular column dedicated to his pastoral visits.

He was later appointed the Archbishop of Fortaleza and was enthroned in Fortaleza on 5 November 1941. He dedicated himself to health care concerns and to that end established archdiocesan health posts for the poor while in 1948 inaugurating a soup kitchen for the poor.

Lustosa authored several books in addition to music he himself wrote and also children's literature as a means of instructing them in the faith and the basic tenets of catechism. He wrote numerous newspaper articles in addition to this. Lustosa also wrote a biographical account of Antônio de Macedo Costa. In 1962 he founded Rádio Assunção which was to serve as a broadcaster for the archdiocese but was later dissolved during the tenure of Aloísio Lorscheider. He also created a total of 34 new parishes in Fortaleza including one Eastern Rite Melkite parish. In Fortaleza he founded the Cardinal Frings Institute in addition to several schools and the Saint Joseph's Hospital. He was also one of the co-founders of the Conferência Nacional dos Bispos do Brasil. His love of the arts also prompted him to adorn the Fortaleza Cathedral with an impressive stained glass window. He was in Rome for the initial preparation of the Second Vatican Council and attended the first session from 11 October to 8 December 1962.

Lustosa departed from his archdiocese with three priests helping him to leave at 6:00am where he got into a van that was to take him into retirement at a Salesian house in Carpina in Pernambuco where he would spend the remainder of his life. He had resigned his see in a letter to Pope John XXIII because he felt that vigorous work belonged to far more active men than he was and that he felt his work was taking its toll upon his health. In 1963 he was made a citizen of Ceará in honor of all his work. In 1968 he broke his femur and this forced him to remain in a wheelchair for a period of time.

He died in 1974 and his remains are interred in the Fortaleza Cathedral. Those that read his will were faced with three words: "I have nothing".

== Beatification process ==
The beatification process opened on 10 August 1992 after the Congregation for the Causes of Saints (CCS) issued the "nihil obstat" (nothing against) edict and titled Lustosa as a Servant of God. The diocesan process was then overseen in Fortaleza from 14 August 1993 until 14 August 2001; the CCS validated this process on 2 May 2003 before receiving the positio dossier from the postulation in 2008 for assessment. Pope Francis named him as venerable on 22 June 2023. The postulator for this cause is the Salesian priest Pierluigi Cameroni.
