= Jaloo (singer) =

- Jaloo in 2026

Background information
- Born: 6 September 1987 (age 39); Castanhal, Pará, Brazil
- Genres: Indie pop; Synth-pop; Música popular brasileira
- Occupations: Singer-songwriter, DJ, music producer
- Years active: 2010–present
- Labels: Skol Music (2014–2017); Elemess, FUGA (2018–present)
- Formerly of: MC Tha; Gaby Amarantos; Os Amantes

Jade de Souza Melo (Castanhal, 6 September 1987), better known by her stage name Jaloo, is a Brazilian singer-songwriter, DJ, and music producer. She is considered one of the leading figures in the indie and electronic music scene in Pará. After a hiatus between 2022 and 2023, she returned to social media affirming her non-binary, gender-fluid identity, and began using female pronouns.

== Career ==
Jaloo began her career in 2010 creating remixes and mashups, especially between artists from Brazil and abroad, for example "Trouble Pretin," which mixes "Pretin" and "Double Bubble Trouble" by Flora Matos and M.I.A.. Her remix "Oblivion Loló," a mix of "Oblivion" and "Minha Vó Tá Maluca" by Grimes and MC Carol, received praise from Grimes. In 2014, she released the EP Insight, with three original songs and a cover of Grimes' "Oblivion." On 5 October 2015, Jaloo released "Ah! Dor!", the first single from her debut album. "Ahǃ Dorǃ" had a music video posted on YouTube.

On 23 October 2015, she released her full-length album, titled #1. The album features 12 songs and incorporates elements of indietronica, tecnobrega, and indie pop, along with Brazilian beats. In January 2016, "A Cidade" received a live music video, serving as the second single from #1. In March 2016, Jaloo released the third single from #1, "Last Dance," a song with a music video directed and written by herself, related to the album cover. In April 2016, she released the EP Ah! Dor!, with a remix by Boss in Drama.

On 15 March 2018, she released her new song, "Say Goodbye," in partnership with BADSISTA. On 31 May 2018, she portrayed a drag queen in her first film, Paraíso Perdido, alongside Júlio Andrade, Erasmo Carlos, Humberto Carrão, and Marjorie Estiano. On 3 August 2018, she released her second single from the album ft, "Céu Azul," in partnership with MC Tha.

In 2021, Jaloo signed on as musical director and producer for Purakê, the second album by singer Gaby Amarantos.

In 2020, Jaloo began her collaboration with the band Strobo on the musical project Os Amantes. The first sample of this collaboration was the release of the single "Ninguém".

Her album MAU was chosen by the São Paulo Art Critics Association as one of the 50 best Brazilian albums of 2023.
