= Vicente Joaquim Zico =

Brazilian Catholic archbishop

Vicente Joaquim Zico CM
- Archbishop of Belém do Pará
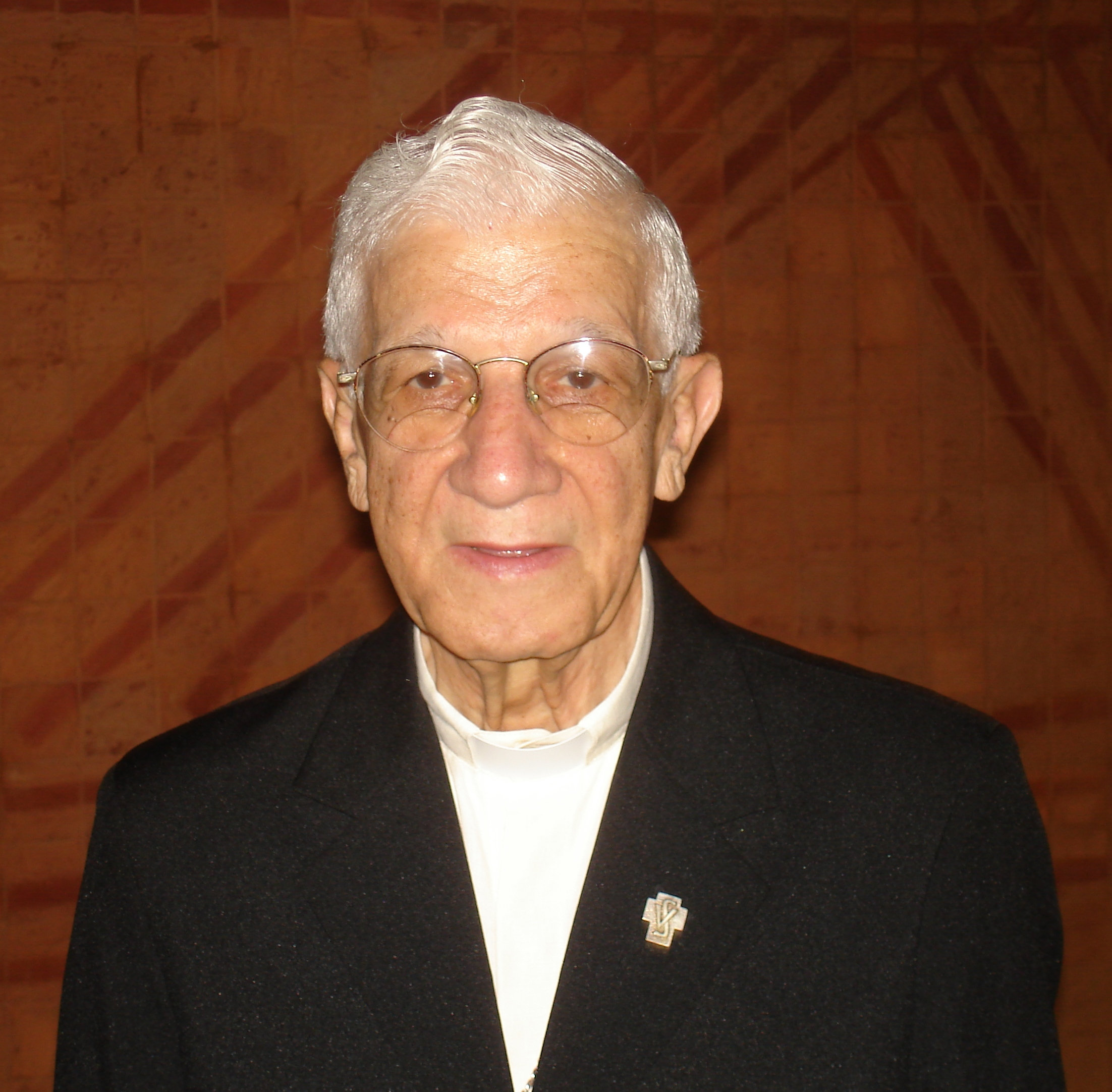
- Zico in 2006
- Church: Catholic Church
- Archdiocese: Archdiocese of Belém do Pará
- In office: 4 July 1990 – 13 October 2004
- Predecessor: Alberto Gaudêncio Ramos
- Successor: Orani João Tempesta
- Previous post: Coadjutor Archbishop of Belém do Pará (1980-1990)

Orders
- Ordination: 22 October 1950
- Consecration: 6 January 1981 by Pope John Paul II

Personal details
- Born: 27 January 1927 Luz, Minas Gerais, Republic of the United States of Brazil
- Died: 4 May 2015 (aged 88)

Vincente Joaquim Zico (27 January 1927 – 4 May 2015) was a Catholic archbishop.

Born in Luz, Minas Gerais, Zico was ordained to the priesthood in 1950. He was appointed coadjutor archbishop of the Roman Catholic Archdiocese of Belem do Pará, Brazil, in 1980, and succeeded to the archdiocese in 1990. He retired in 2004.
