= Vital Maria Gonçalves de Oliveira =

Brazilian Capuchin

Servant of God Antônio Gonçalves de Oliveira OFMCap
- Bishop of Olinda
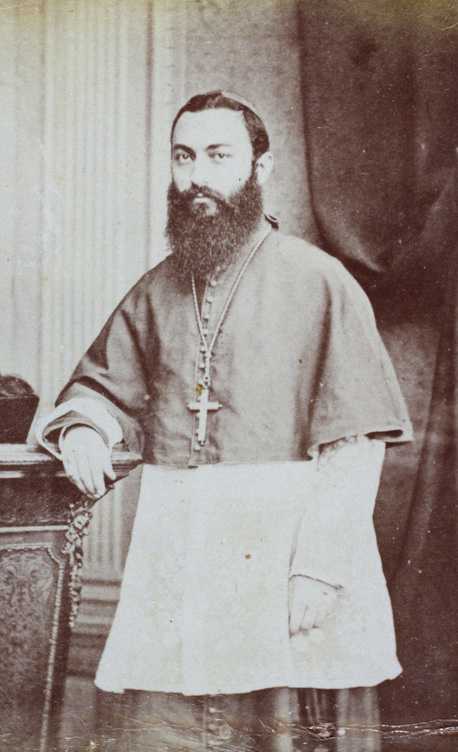
- Church: Roman Catholic Church
- Diocese: Olinda
- See: Olinda
- Appointed: 22 December 1871
- Installed: 24 May 1872
- Term ended: 4 July 1878
- Predecessor: Francisco Cardoso Aires
- Successor: José Pereira da Silva Barros

Orders
- Ordination: 2 August 1868
- Consecration: 17 March 1872 by Pedro Maria de Lacerda
- Rank: Bishop

Personal details
- Born: Antônio Gonçalves de Oliveira; 27 November 1844 Pedras de Fogo, Pernambuco, Brazil
- Died: 4 July 1878 (aged 33) Paris, French Third Republic
- Buried: Basilica Nossa Senhora de Penha, Recife
- Education: Saint-Sulpice seminary
- Motto: Iter para tutum
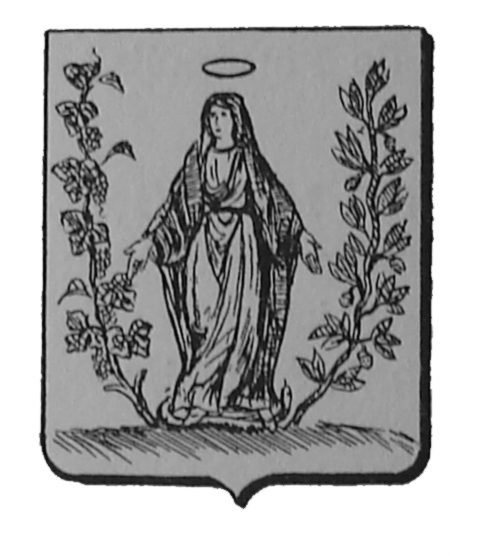
- Coat of arms

Antônio Gonçalves de Oliveira, OFMCap, religious name Vital Maria from Pernambuco - (27 November 1844 – 4 July 1878) - was a Brazilian Capuchin who served as the Bishop of Olinda from 1871 until his death. He was imprisoned from 1874 until 1875 during the crisis ensuring from the Religious Issue after his bold condemnations and actions against Freemasons who came into direct conflict with him. The bishop was a vocal critic of Masonic influence in ecclesial affairs and attempted to have fraternities expel members who were Masonic; an imperial review found that he was risking a severe breach of the constitution which served as the motivator for his arrest and subsequent imprisonment.

The cause for his beatification had its origins from the 1930s though never achieved a formal process until 1953; this too did not last long and the cause remained inactive until 1994 when he became titled as a Servant of God and the cause resumed.

== Life ==
=== Education to episcopal appointment ===
Antônio Gonçalves de Oliveira was born in Pernambuco in Brazil on 27 November 1844 to Antônio Gonçalves and Antonia Albia de Oliveira.

He attended school at Recife and Itambá while he later commenced his studies for the priesthood in Olinda before he continued his studies at the Saint-Sulpice institute abroad in Paris. He became a Franciscan friar after entering the order at Versailles on 16 July 1863 while he received the habit and his religious name on 15 August 1863. He was ordained to the priesthood on 2 August 1868 in Toulouse.

He returned to his native Brazil in November 1863 where he taught seminarians philosophical studies in São Paulo. In 1871 the imperial government of Pedro II elected to choose him to fill the vacant Olinda episcopal see despite his great reluctance to become a bishop; Pope Pius IX confirmed the appointment a month later. He received his episcopal consecration on 17 March 1872 in the São Paulo Cathedral; he was enthroned in his new see on 24 May.

=== The Religious Issue ===
Soon his episcopate would be mired in difficulties with the Freemasons. The Masons became agitated with the Rio de Janeiro diocese in 1872 so decided to retaliate though were confident that the Prime Minister - and fellow Mason - Paranhos would allow them to cause noise.

The Freemasons in Recife announced that their lodge would celebrate a Mass on 30 June 1872 in the San Pedro church; the bishop was firm and demanded all priests not to participate which meant that no Mass could be celebrated for the Masons. But the lodge retaliated and published a list of all clerics who were their affiliates though did not expect that the bishop would be able to take much action. The government tried to settle the matter and sent an imperial minister - who was a relative - to him to urge him not to meddle too much in the affairs of the lodges since the bishop had no power over them. On 28 December 1872 he issued his first statement asking the priests to inform all Christian fraternities to expel those Masonic members who refused to abjure their affiliation to lodges. He took further action on 19 January 1873 when he issued an interdict against those fraternities who did not listen to his previous statement which also forbade those fraternities not to celebrate the sacraments in their chapels or oratories.

Those fraternities appealed to the imperial government the next month with the allegation that the matter was not just a spiritual matter which meant an imperial review could be undertaken. The collective also said no penalties should have been imposed upon them because it was not legitimate. In June 1873 the emperor decided that the fraternities were correct and that the bishop risked breaching the constitution and so ordered the bishop to lift all interdicts which he failed to do. He remained indifferent to this and continued his bold activism against the lodges. But the prosecutor-general brought charges against him to the Supreme Court of Justice who accepted the charges and issued a warrant for the bishop's arrest.

The bishop was arrested at his residence on 2 January 1874 the charge of violating the constitution; the police knocked on his door to see him emerge in his full episcopal attire with his miter and staff in hand. But the police became afraid when the crowds were encouraging the bishop and snarling at the police. To counter these crowds the police moved him to Salvador where he was moved without people knowing so the route to Rio de Janeiro was quiet and more discreet. In Rio de Janeiro he was imprisoned in dreadful conditions until his trial could commence. The pope soon learned of this and sent a letter of protest to Pedro II who disregarded it. The trial against him commenced on 18 February 1874. The public reaction to this was shattering for the government to the point where Pedro II ordered his London ambassador to go to Rome to distort to the Roman Curia the facts of what the bishop had done and to persuade Pius IX to force bishops to retract penalties against Masons. This mission to the pope failed while Cardinal Giacomo Antonelli - who was incorrectly informed of the events - sent a private letter on 18 December 1874 to the imprisoned bishop with mild admonishments; the pope knew nothing of this letter.

He offered no formal defense when he was subpoenaed and he remained silent during the trial where two barristers aided him. The trial concluded not long after in which he was found guilty and sentenced to hard labor for four years though this was soon commuted to a four-year term of imprisonment. Pius IX learnt of this and sent a heartfelt letter to the bishop on 4 March 1874. The Masonic Prime Minister could no longer ignore the public backlash and so appealed to the emperor to do something; Pedro II received much pressure from all sides and so had no recourse but to grant amnesty on 17 September 1875.

But the bishop knew that false impressions against him had been made in Rome from those agents of the government. To that end he left Brazil on 5 October 1875 to present his case to the pope. Upon meeting the pope the latter welcomed him with open arms and said: "O my dear Olinda!" He attempted to get the pope to accept his resignation though the pope refused. He returned in triumph to his diocese on 6 October 1876 and made a pastoral visit across his diocese on horseback.

=== Death and burial ===
He began to suffer an illness that could not be cured for it was far too advanced so travelled to France for treatment. But he died at a Franciscan convent in Paris in mid-1878; his remains were moved back to Brazil in 1882 and were interred in Recife.

== Beatification cause ==
The cause for the late bishop's beatification opened in the Olinda-Recife archdiocese in an informative process that began on 25 July 1953 and was concluded sometime thereafter. The cause remained inactive for several decades and did not seem to move until 1994 when the competent forum for the beatification cause was transferred from Paris (where he died) to his old diocese. He became titled as a Servant of God on 3 November 1994 under Pope John Paul II after the Congregation for the Causes of Saints issued the official "nihil obstat". The diocesan process for collecting documents took place from 18 May 2001 until 4 July 2001 while the C.C.S. validated the process in Rome on 21 February 2003. The C.C.S. received the Positio dossier in 2015 for investigation.
