= Territorial Prelature of Marajó =

Catholic particular church territory

Territorial Prelature of Marajó Praelatura Territorialis Maraiensis Prelazia Territorial de Marajó

Location
- Country: Brazil
- Ecclesiastical province: Belém do Pará
- Metropolitan: Belém do Pará

Information
- Rite: Latin Rite
- Established: 14 April 1928 (97 years ago)

Current leadership
- Pope: Leo XIV
- Bishop: José Ionilton Lisboa de Oliveira
- Metropolitan Archbishop: Júlio Endi Akamine

Website
- www.prelaziadomarajo.com.br

The Territorial Prelature of Marajó (Latin: Praelatura Territorialis Maraiensis) is a Roman Catholic territorial prelature in the city of Marajó in the ecclesiastical province of Belém do Pará in Brazil.

On April 14, 1928, the Territorial Prelature of Marajó was established from the Metropolitan Archdiocese of Belém do Pará.
