= Religious Issue =

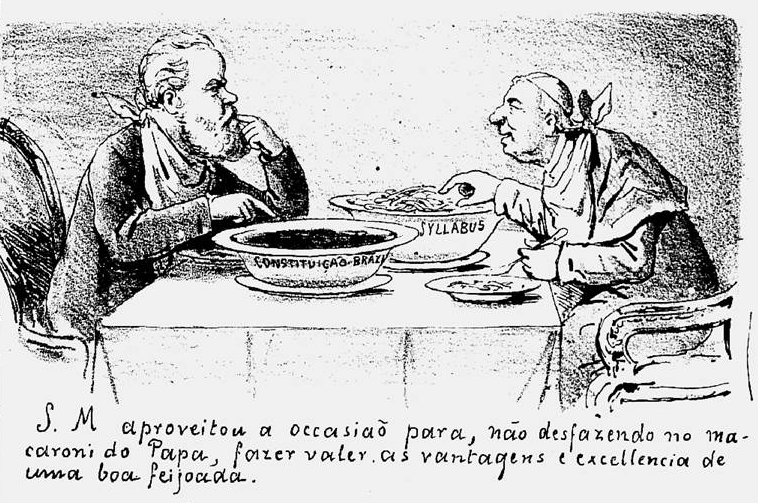
Satire on the Religious Issue. The caption reads: "His Majesty took advantage of the occasion to, not disregarding the Pope's macaroni, assert the advantages and excellence of a good feijoada". The word Syllabus (title of a document by Pope Pius IX condemning the mistakes of modern civilization) appears on the macaroni dish, and the Constitution of Brazil on the feijoada dish

The Religious Issue (Portuguese: Questão Religiosa) was a crisis that took place in the Empire of Brazil in the 1870s, which, having started on 3 March 1872 as a confrontation between the Catholic Church and Freemasonry, ended up becoming a serious state issue. Its causes can be traced back a long time, based on irreconcilable divergences between ultramontanism, liberalism and the padroado regime, and on complex aspects of Brazilian culture. It led to the imprisonment of two bishops and contributed to the fall of the cabinet of Prime Minister José Paranhos, the Viscount of Rio Branco.

The issue evolved centered on the actions of bishops Dom Vital and Dom Macedo Costa, ardent defenders of ultramontane Catholicism. Based on papal ordinances not approved by the Brazilian Empire, they interdicted brotherhoods under their jurisdiction for keeping Freemason members in their circles, and refused to lift the interdicts after express order from the government, since such associations were also governed by the secular power. It was then judged that they violated the Constitution of the Empire and incurred the guilt of civil disobedience, being arrested and sentenced to forced labor.

A short time later they were granted amnesty, but that did not quell the fierce public debate that broke out regarding the union between Church and State, on the contrary, the problem remained under discussion, adding other ideological and social elements and increasingly extreme factions, weakening the authority and the prestige of the monarchy in Brazil. For this reason, the religious issue is considered one of the most striking moments of the Second Reign and one of the factors that precipitated the fall of the monarchy in Brazil, but its analysis remains controversial. With the advent of the First Brazilian Republic, the separation between religious and secular powers was formalized.

Although usually circumscribed in the bibliography to the episode of the bishops, the religious issue in its broadest sense, an expression of a complex and dynamic social and cultural reality, resurfaced with force during the Vargas Era, with the Church regaining great political influence and constitutionally reacquiring several of its former privileges. According to some authors, its effects also reverberated throughout the second half of the 20th century.

== Background ==
In a tradition that had been inherited from the Portuguese Empire, the padroado regime was still in force in Brazil. It was a legal instrument by which the Holy See attributed to the State the responsibility for building temples, organizing brotherhoods, appointing priests and bishops to their respective jurisdictions and providing for their material needs, in such a way that the church members became State employees. This transfer of attributions was justified by the Church as being a privilege granted to civil administrations that demonstrated dedication "to spreading the religion and as a stimulus to future good works". If the padroado imposed important commitments and costs on the State, it also brought advantages, not only political, due to ecclesial support for the reigning dynasty and government programs, but also administrative, since the Brazilian Church had been assuming virtually all of public education, assistance and public services such as registration of births, marriages, baptisms and deaths for centuries.

Reinforcing the connection between the two powers, the Brazilian Empire had defined Catholicism as its official state religion, as expressed in Article 5 of the 1824 Constitution. Although other religions were authorized in domestic worship and persecution for reasons of conscience was prohibited by the same Charter, in practice, the officialization of the Catholic cult excluded those who had not previously sworn allegiance to it from access to public offices. At the same time, the State reserved the right to exercise control over ritual prescriptions and canonical norms emanating from the Holy See if they invaded the secular sphere, if it considered them offensive against the principle of national sovereignty, if they violated Brazilian laws and if they limited autonomy of monarchical power, being able to declare them null and void within Brazilian territory, which was known as the privilege of approval.

Harmony reigned for a long time, albeit at times somewhat tense, between the civil and religious spheres, despite the implicit inconsistencies between Brazilian culture and legislation and the orthodox practice of Catholicism, a harmony that, according to Roque de Barros, can be explained by the looseness of religious customs in the country. For the historian, even if the overwhelming majority of Brazilians declared themselves to be Catholics, what was observed was a high degree of freedom and arbitrary interpretations of the religious canon, freedoms that were not only tolerated but also practiced by the national clergy. An observer at the time, Pereira Barreto, described the situation in the following terms:

"Our clergy is almost entirely deist; all of our current Chamber is deist; almost all of the Senate is deist; the official teaching of philosophy in the academies of São Paulo, Pernambuco, in high schools, in colleges, is exclusively deist; it is, in a word, the pure deism that dominates in all the most educated strata of our society... If we now descend to the uncultured strata of our society, which certainly constitute four-fifths of the population [...], excluding the slave population that is totally fetishistic, despite the Catholic label that covers it, we are left with a large fraction that lives engulfed in the deepest primitive polytheism".

While the people continued with their religious practices tinged with folklore and syncretism, and, uneducated, remained very far from the avant-garde thinking of the time, the elites immersed themselves in a sea of new concepts, doctrines and ideologies, such as the Enlightenment, Freemasonry, scientism, and others that marked the transition from the 18th to the 19th century and still remained influential, bundled in the broad denomination of liberalism. This multiform liberalism was characterized, as a whole, by a spirit of progress, and expressed a deep desire for social, political, religious and humanistic renewal, where freedom of conscience was valued above all. Even a large part of the clergy was imbued with these doctrines, without perceiving any contradiction with the dictates of Catholicism or protesting against the regalist orientation of the institutional system. The discrepancies in relation to Rome reached the point where influential clerics such as priest Diogo Antônio Feijó, one of the regents during the regency period, preached the end of ecclesiastical celibacy, openly embraced liberal ideals and joined Freemasonry, which had been expressly condemned by apostolic constitutions with the penalty of excommunication. In short, strictly speaking, few people in Brazil were in fact Catholic at that time, even though they declared themselves to be; and therefore there was peace between the State and the Church.

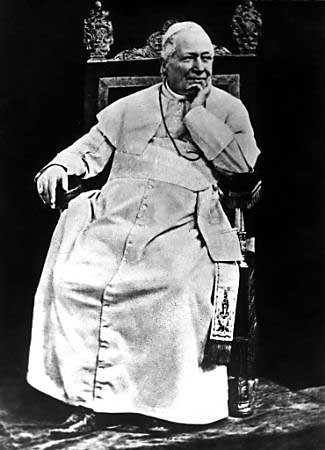
Pope Pius IX

This peace was illusory and precarious, and it would only be necessary for orthodoxy to stand up for it to be broken. And so it was when Pope Pius IX, continuing the trend of his predecessor Gregory XVI, began an aggressive campaign in favor of a return to the medieval way of life and the strict observance of the religious canon from 1848 onwards, condemning modern society on account of an alleged multitude of errors and vices, mainly all forms of "abominable" liberalism, nicknamed "the work of Satan", and claiming the absolute leadership of Rome in the conduct of all matters, whether religious or profane, in the doctrine known as ultramontanism, systematized in the encyclical Quanta cura and its annex, the famous Syllabus.

Pius IX launched a voluminous series of other encyclicals, bulls, briefs and other documents defending his point of view, reinforcing it with the conquest of the prerogative of infallibility for the papacy, erected in dogma in the First Vatican Council (1869–1870). The ultramontane doctrine soon found an echo in some prominent Brazilian clerics, such as bishops Dom Antônio de Melo, Dom Antônio Viçoso and Dom Pedro Maria de Lacerda, and in the more conservative sectors of civil society, including some higher schools. This group, by endorsing the pope's dictum through pronouncements, pastoral letters and intense publicity, began to contest the very constitutive bases of the Empire of Brazil by defending the supremacy of the Church over all other powers, although at no time was there any question of a formal separation between State and Church. Not only that; defending a radical moralization of society and the clergy and a rigorous religious orthodoxy, it clashed with deeply rooted habits in Brazilian culture. And as a corollary of their ideology, ecclesiastics recommended disobeying civil laws if they denied the primacy of religion or caused a problem of conscience in the devotee.

The newspaper O Romano, from Minas Gerais, since the 1850s already proclaimed:

"The flatterers of princes, or the ministers who exercise jurisdiction over them, have converted an idea, in itself very clear and simple, into a chaos of figurative concepts, which no one understands, nor will ever understand [...]. It is certain that princes, or temporal powers, must lend their arm in aid and protection of the Church. But this is more an obligation than a right of the power they exercise, especially those who are fortunate enough to have been illuminated by the faith. Saint Leo said to an Emperor : 'You must already notice that the supreme power was given to you not only for the government of the world, but also very mainly for the protection of the Church'. But who will confuse protection and help, with usurpation and interference? Who could base on the title of protection the right to command or appropriate the same authority to which aid and protection is rendered? Is this not a manifest violation, a contradictory course, to destroy rather than protect?"

Another example, by José Soriano de Souza: "There is no moral progress without the improvement of the spirit, and only Catholicism perfects it [...]. It would be too much to wish for the formation of a Catholic party, which […] took to heart the defense of Catholic doctrines, and tried to pass them on to all acts of the political and social life of the nation, always in conformity with the rules and dictates of the Church". The reaction against ultramontanism was not expected either, given the strongly liberalizing context at the time, in the voices, for example, of Tavares Bastos and Barros Leite. Bastos said: "Let us rise, my friend, and let us hasten to fight the invisible and silent enemy that pursues us in the darkness. He is called the clerical spirit, that is, the corpse of the past; and we are the liberal spirit, that is is, the worker of the future". The other, speaking in the Senate, chastised the behavior of the clergy by saying: "Formerly the bishops among us took an oath to obey the King and not to do anything that could disturb the tranquility of the Empire; today they take no other oath than to the Holy See."

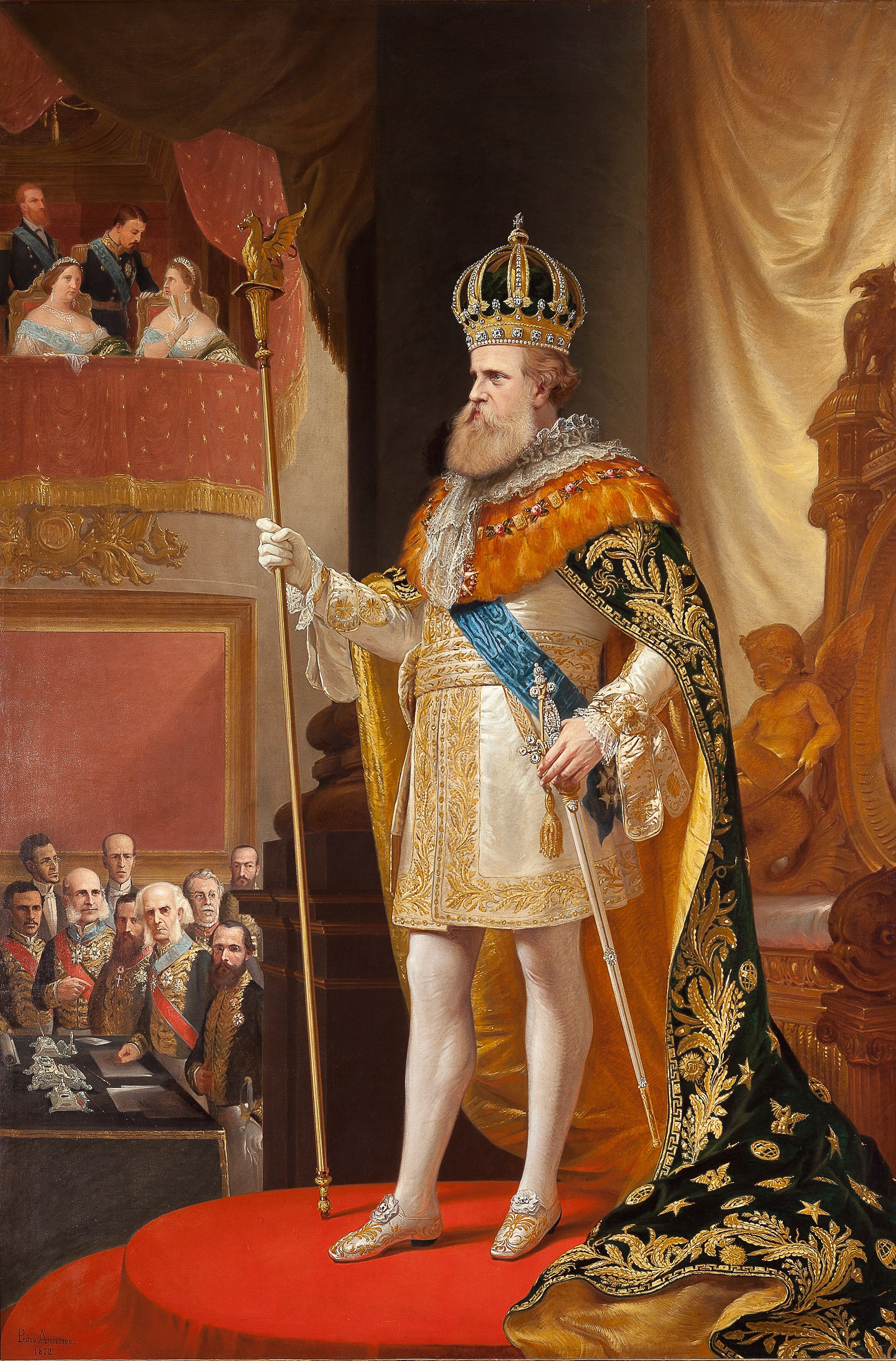
Emperor Pedro II in his "Throne Speech", painting by Victor Meirelles

Another fact relevant to the issue was the principle of monarchy by divine right, which gave the State a powerful support, invested it with a mythical aura and justified that religion was protected and given prestige through the official union between both, but placed it at the in an ambiguous position at the same time, as the tendency towards the secularization of society was unstoppable and liberalism was gaining force even in the legal and institutional spheres. Furthermore, the country's legislation was fundamentally contradictory and did not provide for a coherent legal solution to an open conflict over precedence should it arise, all the more so since emperor Pedro II was on the one hand jealous of his imperial prerogatives and, on the other hand, did not wish to absolutely break with the Church. Freemason Saldanha Marinho analyzed the dilemma as follows:

"In every State where political law is based on religious faith, political law breaks down as soon as religious faith is attacked [...]. The first condition, then, of such a government is the absolute necessity of keeping intact the strength and unity of the religious faith on which it is based — that is, the impossible. It is the impossible and, one might even say, the immoral, barbaric, and appalling abuse of power! [...] It would be necessary for the political law to oppress the spirits, to impose its faith on them, somehow serve as their conscience, and that the executioners finished the impossible work for their preachers [...] Political law is then between these two stumbling blocks; it cannot live longer if it does not maintain, by force, the unity of faith; and it cannot maintain this unity by force, because [...] political law is, despite all imaginable rigors, impotent to maintain religious beliefs. Its rigors may make victims or hypocrites, but it will not make believers."

Completing the picture, other elements came into play shortly before the religious issue presented itself. Many liberals, including parliamentarians, took a radical approach, in which, faced with the contradictions that were proving to be increasingly insoluble within the current institutional framework, they began to defend the republican regime and openly demand the separation of Church and State, which had previously rarely been suggested in public, as it meant an offense to the Constitution. For researcher Antonio Carlos Ribeiro, "the confrontation was accentuated as the traditional, conservative and Romanist wings of the Church had difficulties with the advance of liberal ideas, and the Empire's liberal intellectuals and politicians were unconcerned, since without the placet of the Emperor no decision or instruction of Rome would come into force".

The progressive ideas of positivism, evolutionism, materialism and scientism also influenced the matter, which at this time became particularly important. The very conservative office of the Viscount of Rio Branco was preparing some far-reaching reforms, long demanded by the liberals, in the judiciary, public administration, party organization, education and the electoral system. The campaign in favor of the abolition of slavery in the 1870s also gained momentum with the enactment of the Free Womb Law in 1871. It was predicted that soon there would be no more slaves in Brazil, and with that the problem of where finding cheap labor became urgent, being the subject of constant debate in parliament and throughout society.

The Church contributed with important ideological elements for the legitimization of slavery, since slaves were private property and the right to property was an article of faith since the papacy of John XXII. Since the beginning of the century, programs had been tried to bring immigrants from Europe, who, in addition to lending their arms to farming, would colonize uninhabited regions, and since then thousands of settlers from Germanic, Slavic and other regions had immigrated, mostly Protestants, but preferred by the Catholic government, who regarded them as industrious, moral, and trustworthy. However, in the 1860s-70s, resistance developed to the idea of settling in a country where non-Catholics were in an unfavorable situation, a reality recognized by influential politicians and journalists such as the deputy Baron of Paranapiacaba, the minister of Justice Nabuco de Araújo and Tavares Bastos, exponent of the Liberal Party and being notorious for the difficulties that the first Prussians, English, Swiss and Ukrainians faced in adapting and integrating into Brazilian society and in guaranteeing their freedom of worship, despite official protection to immigrants.

On the other hand, liberals and Freemasons saw in the encouraged spread of Protestantism one of the ways to fight the influence of the Catholic Church, being a period in which several Protestant missionaries and educators from the United States worked in Brazil, creating a large number of followers and students and influencing in the country's politics through their links with powerful patrons. Also coming from there, many Protestant confederates and slaveholders sought a refuge in Brazil from the afflictions they experienced in the American Civil War. The government itself encouraged immigration to get soldiers for the Paraguayan War, specialized labor and farmers. For liberals, Protestant immigrants should be preferred because they were more "modern" and far above Catholics in love of work, education, industriousness and morality, but the Church saw the introduction of Protestantism as a threat to Brazilian traditions and a potential source of social conflict. In this way, with so many contradictions getting worse, in the Brazilian context, the system of "State religion" was patent as an anachronism, and the ground was prepared for the outbreak of crisis.

== Chronology of the crisis ==
=== The beginning ===
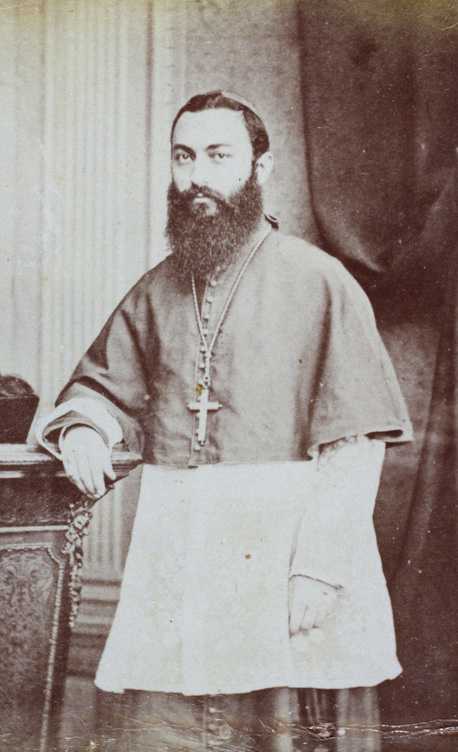
Dom Vital, c. 1879

Disagreements between secular and religious powers occurred several times in previous Brazilian history, such as the criticized Decree 3,073 of 22 April 1863, which interfered in the seminary teaching system, or the protests of bishops Dom Romualdo de Seixas and Dom Sebastião Dias Laranjeira against the use of churches for political meetings and holding elections, but generally had limited impact. The bibliography considers, therefore, as a trigger for the religious issue itself, a speech given on 3 March 1872 in the Grande Oriente do Vale do Lavradio masonic lodge, in Rio de Janeiro, when José Luís de Almeida Martins, a priest, celebrated the Viscount of Rio Branco, at the time Grand Master and prime minister of Brazil, for his political victory that resulted in the enactment of the Free Womb Law. The bishop of the city, Dom Lacerda, faced with the fact, insisted that the priest distance himself from Freemasonry, as required by Church norms; these norms, however, had not received imperial approval. Indifferent to the appeal, the priest published his speech in newspapers with wide circulation. In retaliation, the bishop suspended the priest from exercising sacred orders. Outraged, Freemasonry, uniting the two Grand Orients, one under the aegis of Rio Branco and the other directed by Saldanha Marinho, asserted its strong presence in the Senate and in the Chamber of Deputies to unleash a war in the press against the episcopate. Newspapers were founded in various regions of the country with the declared purpose of fighting "Jesuitism" and ultramontanism, often using derisive and offensive jargon.

The following events centered around the bishop of Olinda, Dom Vital de Oliveira, who had recently taken office. In a pastoral letter dated 17 March, he already instructed his diocesans to abandon the free examination of doctrine and condemned the primacy of reason and all freedom of conscience. In June, Pernambuco Freemasonry commissioned the celebration of a mass to commemorate the anniversary of the founding of a Masonic lodge. The bishop privately ordered the clergy not to celebrate it and the mass did not take place. Shortly afterwards another mass was ordered in memory of a deceased Freemason, again denied by the bishop. Masonic newspapers began attacks and the bishop circulated a pastoral letter warning the clergy not to become involved with the Masonic movement. The prelate also began publishing a series of measures and decrees censuring brotherhoods that had Mason members and punishing recalcitrant priests, including some who were prominent political figures.

Freemasons reacted and published defamatory articles against the bishop in the newspapers. On 28 December, Dom Vital wrote to the vicar of the parish of Santo Antônio recommending that he urge Dr. Antônio da Costa Ribeiro, a Freemason and member of the Brotherhood of the Blessed Sacrament, to withdraw from Freemasonry under penalty of excommunication. If he refused, he should be expelled from the brotherhood, and the vicar would proceed with all the other brothers who joined Freemasonry. The brotherhood refused to comply with the orders because its statutes did not provide for expulsion for that reason, since Freemasonry was authorized to function in Brazil and the statutes of the brotherhoods had approval from the civil authorities. The bishop repeated the threat, and when the brotherhood again refused, he issued an interdict on it.

=== State intervention ===
The case went beyond the limits of the diocese and reached the Chamber of Deputies in Rio de Janeiro, where the problematic union between Church and State was openly brought up. On 20 January 1873 the brotherhood turned to the bishop and asked him to compromise, but on the same date the interdict was upheld as irrevocable. Therefore, the brotherhood had nothing to do but appeal to the Crown, basing its appeal on Article 1 of Decree No. 1,911 of 28 March 1857, which dealt with cases of usurpation of temporal power and violence in the exercise of spiritual power. Intensely pressured by the Freemasons, and with the government fearing that it would take the conservative cabinet with it, the appeal was accepted and forwarded to the president of the province, Henrique Pereira de Lucena, who questioned the bishop and asked him for an explanation.

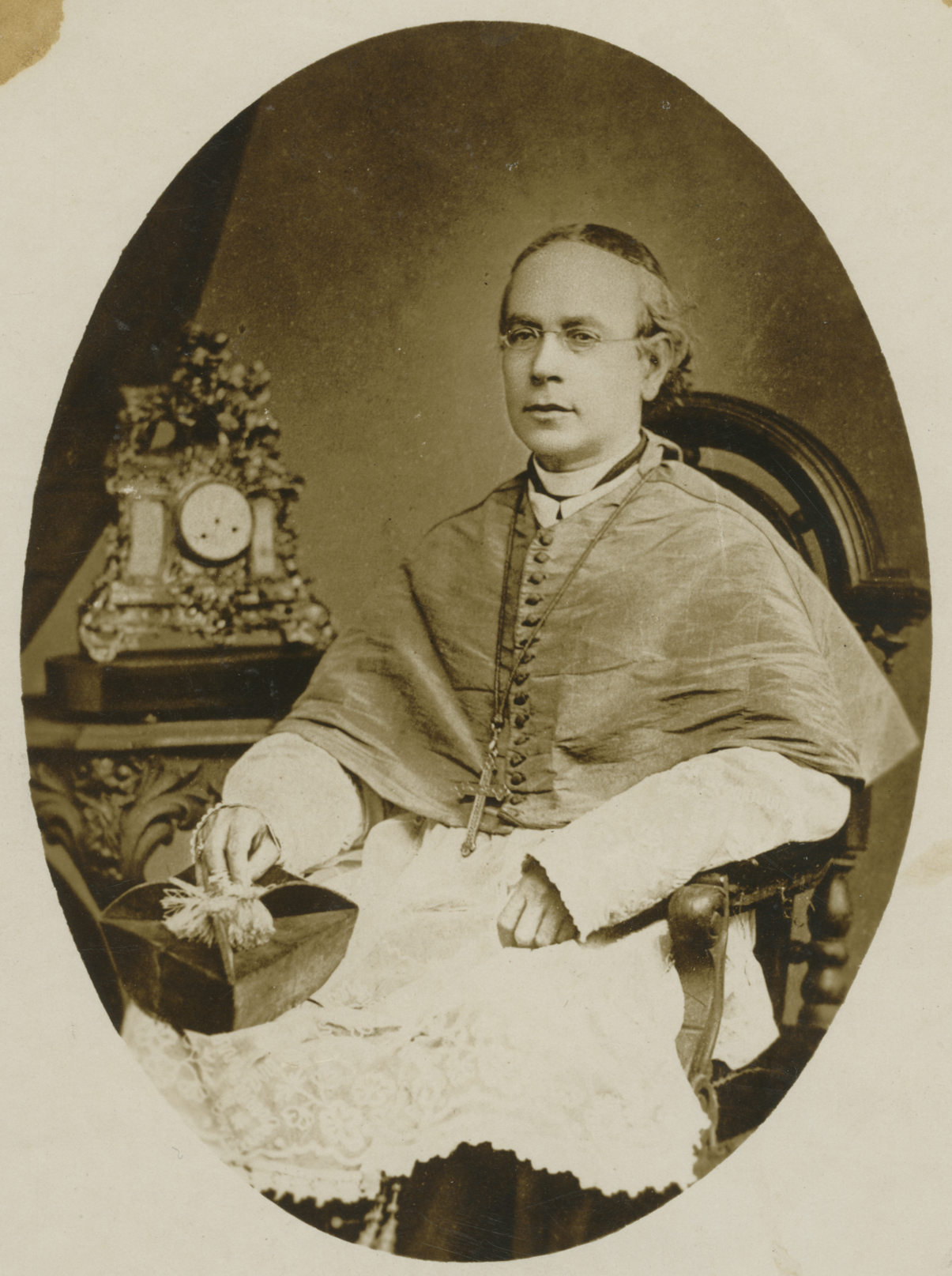
Dom Antônio de Macedo Costa

Dom Vital did not retract, but in his defense he claimed that the imperial approval — which authorized the functioning of Freemasonry in Brazil, repelling the condemnation of the Church — was a doctrine condemned by Rome; that even if it were an accepted doctrine, it would not cover the period in which the bulls In Eminenti (1738), by Clement XII, and Provida Romanorum Pontificum (1751), by Benedict XIV, were published, recognized throughout the kingdom of Portugal and its colonies when the consent was suspended there; and finally that even the defenders of the imperial approval recognized that it did not apply to ecclesiastical censures and penalties. The State could not accept either the first or the third reasons — the third because the brotherhoods were supported by secular law — although the origin of the second was discussed throughout the entire religious issue. After being heard, the Crown prosecutor judged that the bishop had exceeded his powers, invading the jurisdiction of the judge of chapels, and forwarded the case to the Council of State. Before the Council issued its opinion, another main character entered the scene, the Bishop of Pará, Dom Macedo Costa.

Dom Macedo, like Dom Vital, decreed the expulsion of all Masons from brotherhoods and confraternities on 23 March 1873, and if they resisted, they would be interdicted. He also excluded Freemasons from the sacrament of absolution and burial in consecrated ground. Three brotherhoods immediately appealed to the president of the province, who forwarded the petition to the Crown. Before the government became aware of the case, the Council of State issued its opinion on Dom Vital's process. Fully based on regalism, the opinion refuted the bishop's arguments and, in a letter dated 12 June, gave him a period of one month to lift the interdict.

Vital's response was predictable: without complying with the order received, he not only contested the council's allegations point by point, but also rejected State interference in the controversy, going so far as to boldly question the entire regalist doctrine: "either the Government of Brazil declares itself as non-Catholic, or declares itself Catholic [...]. If the Brazilian Government is Catholic, not only is it not the head or superior of the Catholic religion, but it is even its subject". On the same day that he received the warning from the government, he received the reply to a report he had made to the pope concerning the interdiction. The pope, in the brief Quamquam dolores, recommended that he give a period of one year so that Freemasons could convert and return to the Church. If they did not, then the bishop could use the rigor of canonical penalties and even dissolve the brotherhood. But to complicate the situation, in the meantime Dom Vital had already interdicted other brotherhoods, and soon after he again confronted the civil power by publishing the papal document without the knowledge or authorization of the government, contrary to Article 102 of the Constitution, becoming a defendant of civil disobedience. If his condemnation was predictable before, with this last act it became inevitable.

In the meantime, the process of the bishop of Pará was examined by the same Council, which gave the same opinion but emphasized that it was a case of greater gravity, since the bishop had taken the brotherhoods by surprise and had not bothered to respond to the official accusations. He was given fifteen days, beginning on 9 August, to lift the interdicts. Deciding to ignore the council's demands, Dom Macedo only gave a response on 4 October, in which he did not discuss the accusations, but justified himself by saying that he could not, "without apostatizing from the Catholic faith, recognize in civil power the authority to direct the religious functions, nor agree in any way with the doctrines of the Council of State […] because they are subversive of all ecclesiastical jurisdiction, and clearly condemned by the Holy Church".

For the government, the situation was clear: the bishops' rebellion was a serious matter and threatened to spread throughout the country. On 21 August, the Minister of Foreign Affairs, Carlos Carneiro de Campos, the Viscount of Caravelas, entrusted the Baron of Penedo with a mission to the Vatican. The emissary had to get the pope's support so that he moderated his bishops, preventing similar situations from occurring in the future. And it should be no secret that the Brazilian government intended to use strong measures if it did not achieve its objective.

Penedo himself did not believe in the success of such a mission, as the government was not willing to compromise on anything, but after arduous negotiations the result was a complete success, obtaining an instruction from the Pope to Cardinal Antonelli to write a letter of censure to Dom Vital, with orders that he restore the rights of the brotherhoods and restore the general tranquility that he had disturbed. A copy should also be sent to the Bishop of Pará. On the other hand, the pope requested that no hostile measures be taken against his prelates. With that apparently the religious issue would end. However, before the government knew about this result, which was favorable to its interests, things in Brazil took a turn for the worse, jeopardizing all the efforts of the ambassador. Only on 20 December did the report from Penedo reach Caravelas, but on 27 September an order had already been issued for the Crown prosecutor, Francisco Baltazar de Oliveira, to file a formal complaint against Dom Vital, accusing him of disobedience and to make war on the government, the Criminal Code and the Constitution. On 17 December, Dom Macedo was also formally denounced, on the same grounds. In their defense, the bishops decided to remain silent, as to respond would be to recognize the competence of the civil power to judge the cause.

=== Outcome ===
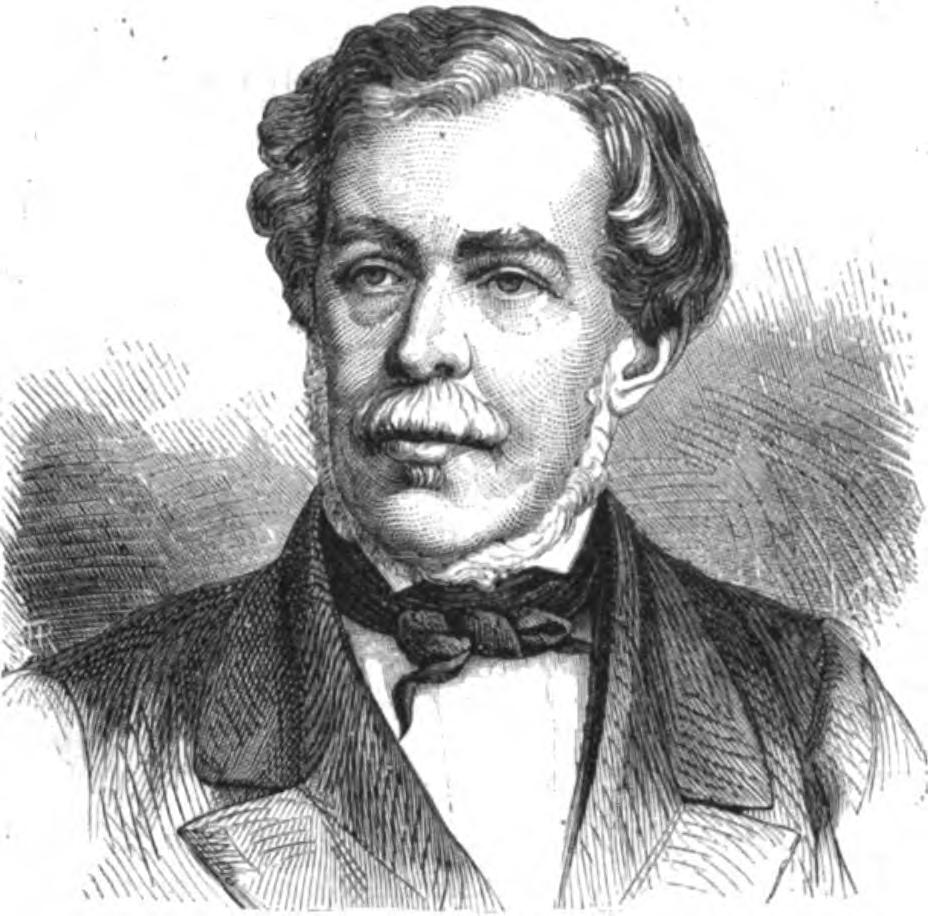
In the third time he held the office of Prime Minister, Luís Alves de Lima e Silva, the Duke of Caxias, participated in the end of the conflict between the State and the bishops

Dom Vital was arrested in Recife on 2 January 1874, detained at the Navy Arsenal and later sent to Rio de Janeiro to be tried. Dom Macedo had the same fate, arrested on 28 April. And both, in their judgments, remained silent, claiming that "Jesus Christ was also silent", in reference to Jesus' attitude when his enemies accused him before Caiaphas. However, both had defenders who came forward spontaneously. Despite the lawyers' skill, and the emotional rhetoric they developed, the jury's verdict was ruthless and predictable, moved by the political aspect of the matter, condemning the bishops to four years in prison with forced labor, a penalty to be served by Dom Vital at Fort São João, and Dom Macedo at the fortress on Ilha das Cobras. Shortly afterwards the sentences were commuted to simple imprisonment.

The condemnation of the bishops triggered an intense and passionate controversy throughout Brazil, with repercussions abroad as well. The Vatican responded indignantly, claiming that it had been tricked by the Baron of Penedo, who had assured it of the bishops' immunity—which Penedo later denied having done. The first protest came through the internunciation Sanguigni, which was immediately sharply rejected by Caravelas. Then the pope wrote to emperor Pedro II threatening him with divine judgment and saying that "the higher someone is, the more severe will be the reckoning". With much political acumen, the pope also said that "Your Majesty […] has dealt the first blow to the Church, without thinking that it is at the same time shaking the foundations of your throne".

In the Senate and in the Chamber of Deputies, diametrically opposed parties formed, one vehemently criticizing the jury's attitude, and the other seeing benevolence in it, and wishing that the penalty had been even more severe. The cabinet of the Baron of Rio Branco could not withstand the pressure and fell. The Duke of Caxias was invited by the monarch to reorganize the government (see Cabinet Caxias of 1875), but Caxias placed the amnesty of the two bishops as a condition. The popular outcry, the Duke's demand and the pleading of Princess Isabel, who was a devout Catholic, made the emperor yield. He said in a note to Caxias: "The withdrawal of the ministry would have more serious consequences than the refusal of the amnesty [...]. Let the ministry do it, but without my approval". In a decree of 17 September 1875, the amnesty was completed and the bishops returned to their dioceses, where they were received in triumph.

Shortly afterwards Dom Vital visited the Pope in the Vatican, who received him paternally and said: "I approve of everything that Your Excellency has done from the beginning". On 29 April 1876, the pope addressed the encyclical Exortae in ista ditione to the bishops, warning that the lifting of interdicts in no way meant a tolerance for Freemasonry, on the contrary, it remained punished with excommunication. The document ended by saying that the Vatican and the Crown would soon initiate understandings, but that never happened.

== Aftermath ==
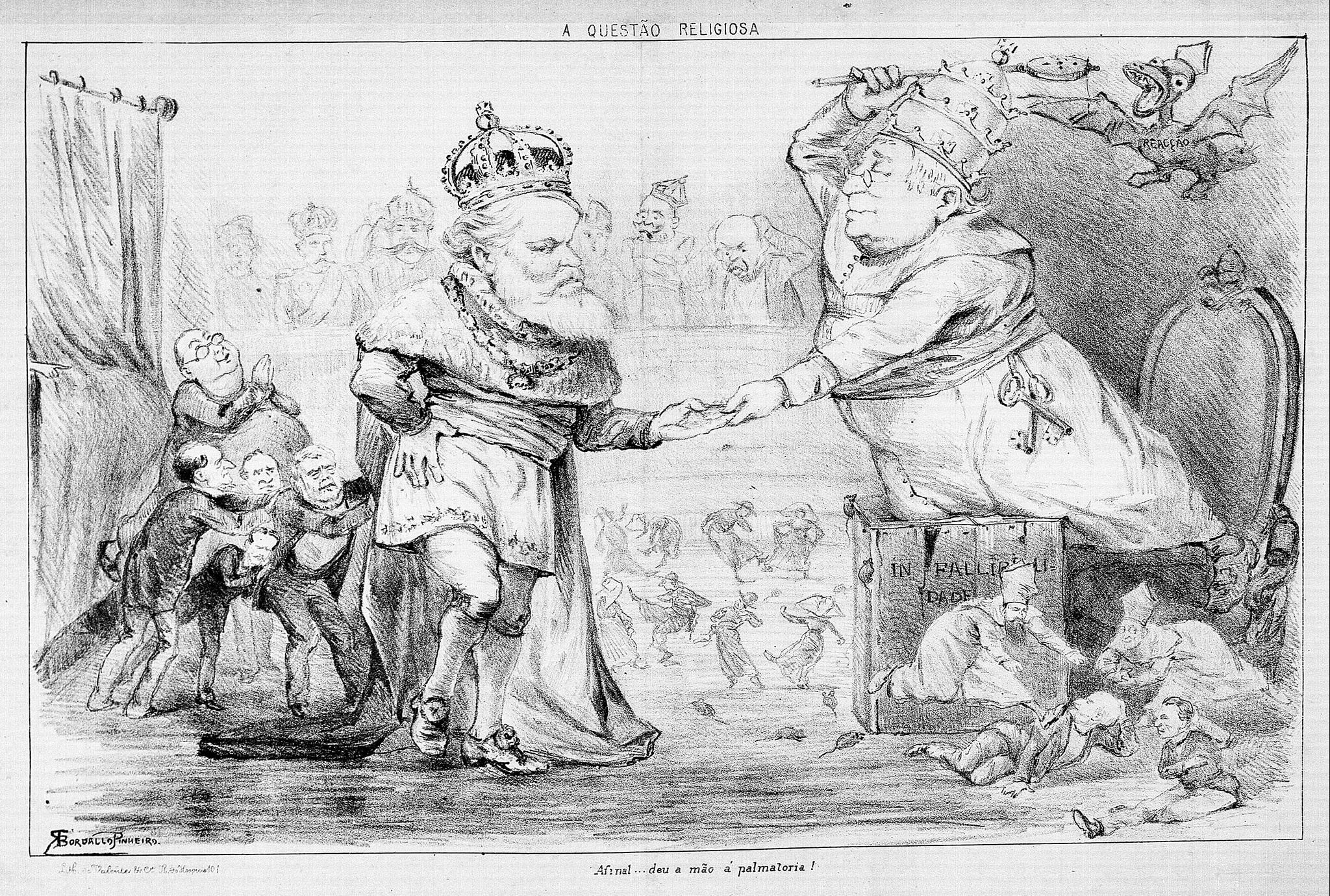
1875 satire by Bordalo Pinheiro referring to the bishops' amnesty. The original caption read: After all... he [Pedro II] ceded his hand to the paddle!

Contrary to the emperor's prediction, the amnesty, despite officially ending the religious issue, not only did not solve the problem the crisis had raised, but also aggravated it, weakening the position of the monarchy in the eyes of public opinion. The issue became generalized, and the mutual attacks and provocations became more poignant. And even with all this, the formal separation between the constituted powers was still not desired by any of them.

For Luiz Eugênio Véscio, the incompatibility between Church and State, explained by the religious issue, intensified the desire for the opening of independent channels of expression in many people, specific to each sphere. And little by little the old padroado regime was being dismantled: the decree of 19 April 1879 on free education exempted from the oath of allegiance to Catholicism — or to any creed — public servants in primary and secondary schools; the electoral reform instituted by the Saraiva Law, of 9 January 1881, authorized people of any religion to become eligible. Even so, in 1884 Júlio de Castilhos explicitly recognized that the issue had not yet been resolved, and required the attention of the legislature.

Complete separation would only be achieved in the First Brazilian Republic. In fact, the previously disunited republicans, worsening the crisis, as José Ramos Tinhorão picturesquely described, took advantage of the moment of confusion to join forces and unfurl their flags: the immediate separation between Church and State, the full freedom of worship and perfect statutory equality between them all, the separation of secular teaching from religious teaching, the secularization of cemeteries, the institution of civil marriage and civil registration of births and deaths, and, of course, the adoption of the republican regime.

The republican rise was not exclusively due to the discrediting of the monarchy because of the religious issue. In the words of Cesar Vieira, "other ingredients would be added to the conflict, increasing the degree of dissatisfaction and raising the spirits of Freemasons, republicans, positivists and the military themselves, who, led by marshal Deodoro da Fonseca, overthrew the 36th Cabinet of the Empire and proclaimed the Republic on 15 November 1889". Among these "other ingredients" were, as Cristiano Ottoni observed at the time, the natural evolution of the idea of republic and the massive rejection of monarchy by slaveholders, who saw themselves stripped of their main workforce with the abolition of 1888. Catholics in general did not want a regime change; they did criticize the reigning emperor, but they looked forward to the accession to the throne of Princess Isabel, known for her religious fervor. However, the way in which the government understood its union with the Church, as a guardianship and control of it by the former, did not please the clergy, and that separation, in this context, could be equivalent to a liberation. It is significant, in this sense, that Pope Leo XIII stated to president Campos Sales in 1898 that "the Church feels better today in Brazil with its republican institutions than under the fallen regime".

However, even though the pope welcomed the new regime, the official separation of powers actually provoked protests from the Church, as among other measures introduced the clergy lost their immunities and had their salaries cut, members of religious communities that included a vow of obedience to Rome had their political rights revoked, civil marriage was instituted and the civil effects of religious marriages were annulled, religious teaching was abolished in public schools and the excuse for reasons of conscience or creed for non-compliance with civil obligations was rejected, starting to imply loss of political rights. In the 1891 Constitution God was not even invoked. A practical result of this was a rapid and important decline in vocations, forcing a massive recruitment of foreign clergy to fill vacancies not covered by nationals.

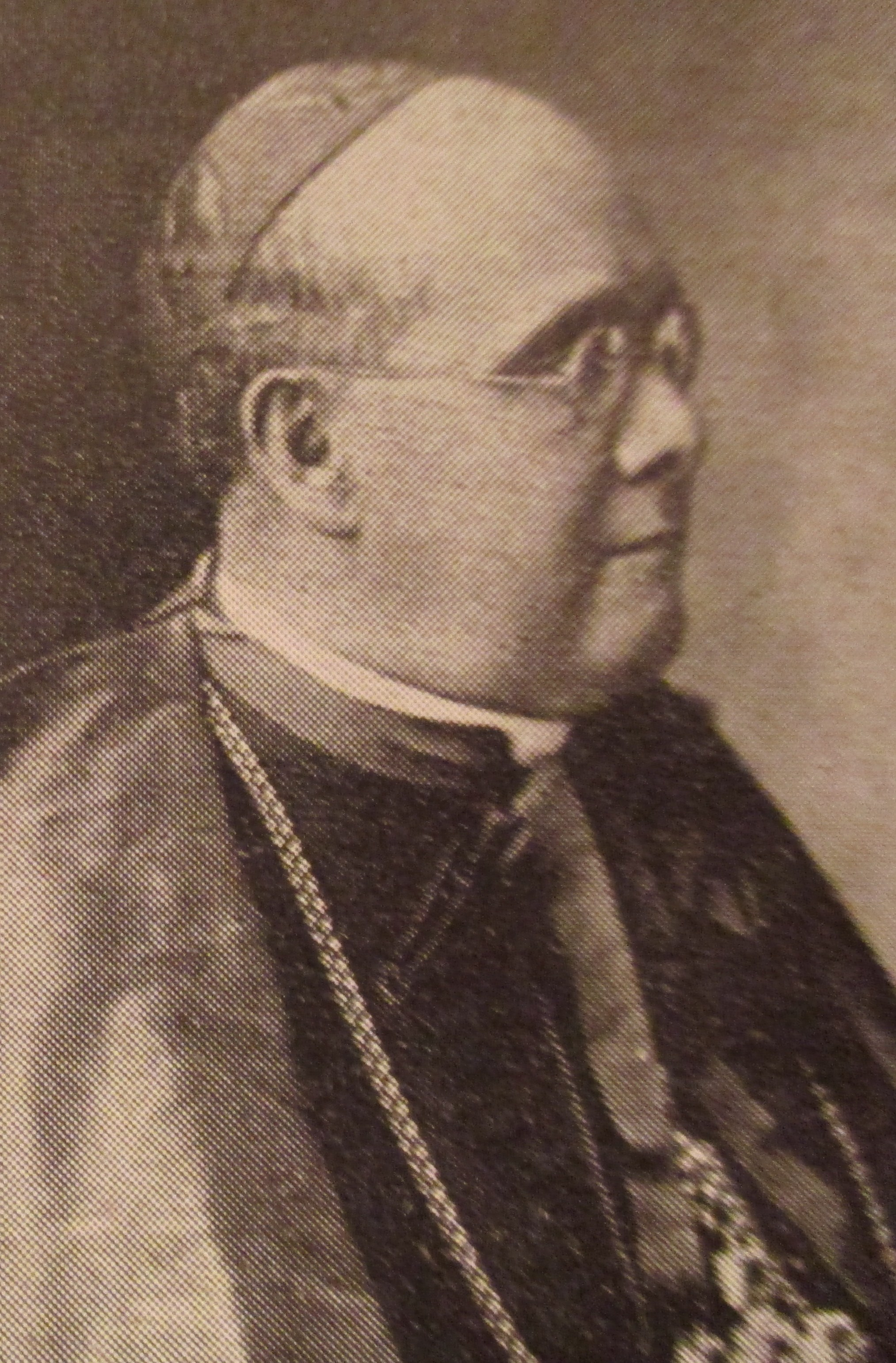
Cardinal Leme, the most notable exponent of the new Catholic militancy in the Vargas Era

The crisis also provided, in parallel, a greater penetration of Protestantism, occupying a social space opened by the general wear and tear caused by the crisis. The same loophole was taken advantage of by other minority faiths, such as Judaism and Spiritism. Furthermore, the opposition between Church and Freemasonry was not resolved, however, not even with the advent of the Republic, remaining lit until the middle of the 20th century. Pope Pius IX's successors issued several other documents condemning Freemasons; the same Leo XIII in the bull Humanus genus persisted saying that Freemasonry was the "incarnation of the Devil", which came to cast a heavy shadow on the popular imagination and create a conspiracy theory, largely because the organization continued to be a secret society, claiming that what its members preached about patriotism, solidarity, beneficence, religious tolerance, equality and fraternity, were nothing but decoys that concealed dangers and subversion and sought the destruction of humanity.

With regard to relations between Church and State, after a phase of indifference between both at the beginning of the Republic, and the dissolution of much of the prestige of the clergy, from the 1920s onwards, and especially during the Vargas Era, the Church reorganized itself and began to actively seek to recover the rights and privileges that the Republic had taken away from it, understanding that Brazil was a Catholic country and that the Church was the maximum expression of its religiosity. Again invoking principles of ultramontanism, direct reference was made to the basic problem that had not been resolved in the Empire and that until then under the Republic had remained dormant, insisting, as Schallenmueller said, "on the return of that ancient symbiosis with temporal power". Several intellectuals, such as Jackson de Figueiredo and Alceu Amoroso Lima, embraced the Catholic cause, and countless lay societies dedicated to militancy emerged. At the same time, the political elite, in the moment of uncertainty they were going through, understood that the Church could again serve as a legitimizing force for their purposes, and sought a rapprochement. During this period, the activism of Cardinal Leme stood out, who in 1921 approved the foundation, among others, of an association symptomatically called Centro Dom Vital, conservative and right-wing, which was supposed to expand the penetration of the intellectual apostolate in the country.

His apologetics, which lamented the passivity of Catholics and did not shy away from politics if it threatened morals, education and doctrinal aspects considered basic by the Church, can be exemplified in the following excerpts:

"What is this Catholic majority, so insensitive, when laws, governments, literature, schools, press, industry, commerce and all other functions of national life prove to be contrary or alien to the principles and practices of Catholicism? It is evident, therefore, that, despite being the absolute majority of Brazil, as a nation, we do not have and do not live a Catholic life. That is to say: we are a majority that does not fulfill its social duties" […]. "Instead of a plaintive chorus, let us form a fighting legion: whoever knows how to speak, let him speak; who knows how to write, let him write; who does not speak or write, let him disseminate the writings of others" [...]. "If any political struggle had points of Catholic doctrine as a differential character, we would no longer be in merely political affairs, but in a true religious issue" [...] "Far be it from me the heresy of saying that Religion has nothing to do with Politics. It would be a basic error, a thousand times condemned and a thousand times condemnable". "Either the State recognizes the God of the people, or the people do not recognize the State".

On the discipline necessary for militancy, Leme said: "An authority, a guiding center, a word of direction, a voice of command is necessary. This can only be that of the Bishop whom God has placed in the government of his Church". By founding the Catholic Electoral League, he managed to rally the Catholic electorate, instructing them to only vote for candidates approved by the clergy. On the occasion of popular events such as the inauguration of Christ the Redeemer on Corcovado and the consecration of the country to Our Lady of Aparecida, both in 1931, the cardinal gathered real crowds in a public square in order to "show the new government the strength of the Church and the need to take it into account in the new political order that was being built". Leme was a personal friend of Getúlio Vargas and, according to Mainwaring, influenced many of his decisions and his many movements to strengthen ties between State and Church. The result of militancy was significant, and important Catholic demands, such as the right to vote for priests, the prohibition of divorce, the return of religious teaching in public schools, the possibility of subsidizing Catholic schools by the State, recognition of civil effects for religious marriage, and the right of priests to serve in the Army as chaplains, were addressed in the 1934 Constitution. In 1937, still on Leme's advice, in the wake of rapprochement with integralism and fascism and the fight against communism, another of his Catholic projects, Vargas did not resume commercial relations with the Soviet Union.

However, with the fall of the Estado Novo, the alliance of 1934 was little recognized, and with the 1946 Constitution the separation between the powers deepened. The Church was still influential, but not as much as before, reaping the bitter fruits of its failed approach with the right. Finally, in some later moments, echoes of ultramontanism and a kind of new, unofficial padroado would still be heard again, sometimes vigorously, as in the birth of the National Conference of Bishops of Brazil, which claimed the direction of all the Catholic organizations in the country and sought to be present in all places where the fate of Brazilian society was decided; during the government of Juscelino Kubitschek, who financed many Church initiatives and sought a rapprochement, and in the "marches for the family" of 1964, or in small circles, as in TFP activities. As has been seen, the effects of the Religious Issue had long-term repercussions; they were not limited to the 19th century, but reheated in the first half of the 20th century and, as Wellington da Silva argued, dug "deep furrows also in the Catholic mentality of the second half of that same century".

== See also ==
- Papal ban of Freemasonry
- Quebra-Quilos revolt
