= Angelo Frosi =

Italian clergyman and auxiliary bishop

- Bishop of Abaetetuba
- Church: Roman Catholic Church
- See: Diocese of Abaetetuba
- In office: 1970 - 1995
- Predecessor: Giovanni Gazza
- Successor: Flávio Giovenale
- Previous post: Prelate of Abaeté do Tocantins

Orders
- Ordination: 6 May 1948
- Consecration: 1 May 1970 by Archbishop Gaudêncio Ramos

Personal details
- Born: 31 January 1924 San Bassano, Italy
- Died: 28 June 1995 (aged 71) Abaetetuba, Brazil

Angelo Frosi (born 31 January 1924 in San Bassano), was an Italian clergyman and auxiliary bishop for the 2nd Bishop of Diocese of Abaetetuba. He was ordained in 1948 and appointed a bishop in 1981. He died in 1995.
