= Orani João Tempesta =

Brazilian prelate

His Eminence Orani João Tempesta O.Cist.
- Cardinal; Archbishop of São Sebastião do Rio de Janeiro
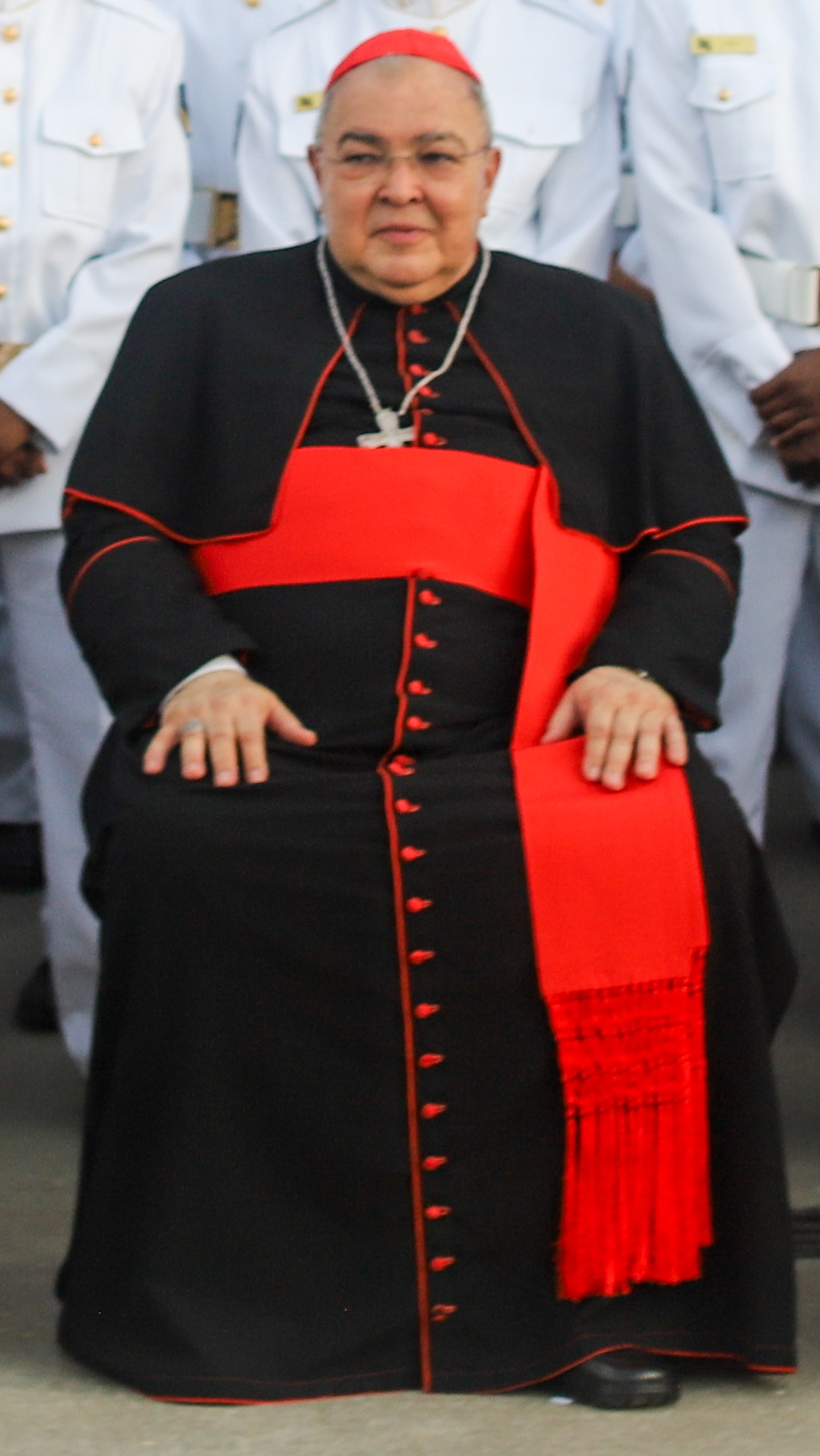
- Cardinal Tempesta in 2024
- Church: Roman Catholic Church
- Archdiocese: São Sebastião do Rio de Janeiro
- See: São Sebastião do Rio de Janeiro
- Appointed: 27 February 2009
- Installed: 19 April 2009
- Predecessor: Eusébio Oscar Scheid S.C.J.
- Other post: Cardinal-Priest of Santa Maria Madre della Providenza a Monte Verde (2014–)
- Previous posts: Abbot of the Monastery of São Bernardo (1996–1997); Bishop of Rio Preto (1997–2004); Apostolic Administrator of the Territorial Abbey of Claraval (1999–2002); Archbishop of Belém do Pará (2004–2009)

Orders
- Ordination: 7 December 1974 by Tomás Vaquero
- Consecration: 25 April 1997 by José de Aquino Pereira
- Created cardinal: 22 February 2014 by Pope Francis
- Rank: Cardinal Priest

Personal details
- Born: Orani João Tempesta; 23 June 1950 (age 76) São José do Rio Pardo, São Paulo, Brazil
- Denomination: Catholicism
- Motto: Ut omnes unum sint (That all might be one)
- Coat of arms: Orani João Tempesta's coat of arms

Ordination history of Orani João Tempesta
History
Episcopal consecration
- Principal consecrator: Jose de Aquino Pereira
- Co-consecrators: Dadeus Grings; Luiz Gonzaga Bergonzini
Cardinalate
- Elevated by: Pope Francis
Episcopal succession
Bishops consecrated by Orani João Tempesta as principal consecrator
- Edmilson Amador Caetano, O. Cist.: 28 March 2008
- Pedro Cunha Cruz: 5 February 2011
- Nelson Francelino Ferreira: 5 February 2011
- Paulo Cezar Costa: 5 February 2011
- Luiz Enrique da Silva Brito: 12 May 2012
- Roque Costa Souza: 23 June 2012

Styles of Orani João Tempesta, O. Cist.
- Reference style: His Eminence
- Spoken style: Your Eminence
- Religious style: Cardinal
- Posthumous style: None
- Informal style: Cardinal

Orani João Tempesta O.Cist. (pronounced [oɾɐˈni ʒuˈɐ̃w tẽˈpɛʃtɐ, - ˈʒwɐ̃w -]; born 23 June 1950) is a Brazilian prelate of the Catholic Church who has been archbishop of Rio de Janeiro since 2009. He was previously bishop of São José do Rio Preto from 1997 to 2004 and archbishop of Belém do Pará from 2004 to 2009.

== Early years ==
Tempesta was born in São José do Rio Pardo in the State of São Paulo. He is the youngest son of the Italian immigrant Achille Tempesta and his Brazilian wife Maria de Oliveira.

After completing his elementary and lower secondary-school studies in São José do Rio Pardo, Tempesta entered the Cistercian Monastery of São Bernardo in the same city in 1967. He studied philosophy at the Monastery of São Bento (St. Benedict) in São Paulo, and theology at the Salesian Theological Institute of Pope Pius IX in São Paulo.

Tempesta made his religious profession as a monk on 2 February 1969 and was ordained a priest on 7 December 1974. He was appointed prior of the monastery in 1984, while also acting as parish priest of the Parish of São Roque, as Diocesan Coordinator of Communications and Pastoral Care, and as professor at the Coração de Maria institute in São João da Boa Vista. In September 1996, when the Monastery of São Bernardo was raised to the status of an abbey, he was elected its first abbot.

== Bishop ==
On 26 February 1997, Tempesta was appointed Bishop of São José do Rio Preto and received episcopal consecration on 25 April of that year. In addition he was Apostolic Administrator of the territorial abbacy of Claraval from 1999 until it was united with the Diocese of Guaxupé on 11 December 2002.

On 13 October 2004 Tempesta was appointed the Archbishop of Belém do Pará, and in 2007 he was a delegate to the Fifth General Conference of the Bishops of Latin American and the Caribbean.

On 27 February 2009 Tempesta was named Archbishop of Rio de Janeiro. He took possession of the see on 19 April 2009. Tempesta received the pallium from Pope Benedict on 29 June 2009.

Tempesta is the Grand Prior of the Rio de Janeiro Lieutenancy of the Equestrian Order of the Holy Sepulchre of Jerusalem.

== Cardinal ==
Pope Francis announced in January 2014 that he would make Tempesta a cardinal on 22 February 2014. He was made a cardinal priest and assigned the titular church of Santa Maria Madre della Provvidenza a Monte Verde.

In September 2014, he was appointed a member of the Congregation for the Evangelization of Peoples, and later of the Congregation for Catholic Education, and the Pontifical Council for the Laity.

In 2016, Cardinal Tempesta had to shelter behind his car during a gun battle between police and armed bandits. He was on his way to the airport when shooting forced his car to stop. "When [the firing] subsided a bit, we reversed and took another street," Cardinal Tempesta told blog Sim, sou Católico. "I could see there with me, so many good people with the desire to live in peace in a more peaceful and fraternal world. Many were going to work, and suddenly needed to guard against any possible stray bullet," Cardinal Tempesta said later.

Tempesta participated as a cardinal elector in the 2025 papal conclave that elected Pope Leo XIV.

== See also ==
- Cardinals created by Francis

Catholic Church titles
Preceded by José de Aquino Pereira	Bishop of São José do Rio Preto; 27 February 1997 – 11 December 2002	Succeeded by Paulo Mendes Peixoto
Preceded by Vicente Joaquim Zico	Archbishop of Belém do Pará; 13 October 2004 – 19 April 2009	Succeeded by Alberto Taveira Corrêa
Preceded by Eusébio Scheid	Archbishop of Rio de Janeiro; 27 February 2009 –	Incumbent
Preceded by Luis Aponte Martinez	Cardinal-Priest of Santa Maria Madre della Providenza a Monte Verde; 22 February 2014 –	Incumbent
Order of precedence
Preceded by Geraldo Alckmin as Vice President of Brazil	Brazilian order of precedence 3rd in line as Brazilian cardinal	Followed by Foreign ambassadors
