= Archdiocese of Belém do Pará =

Catholic ecclesiastical territory

Archdiocese of Belém do Pará Archidioecesis Belemensis de Pará Arquidiocese de Belém do Pará

Catholic
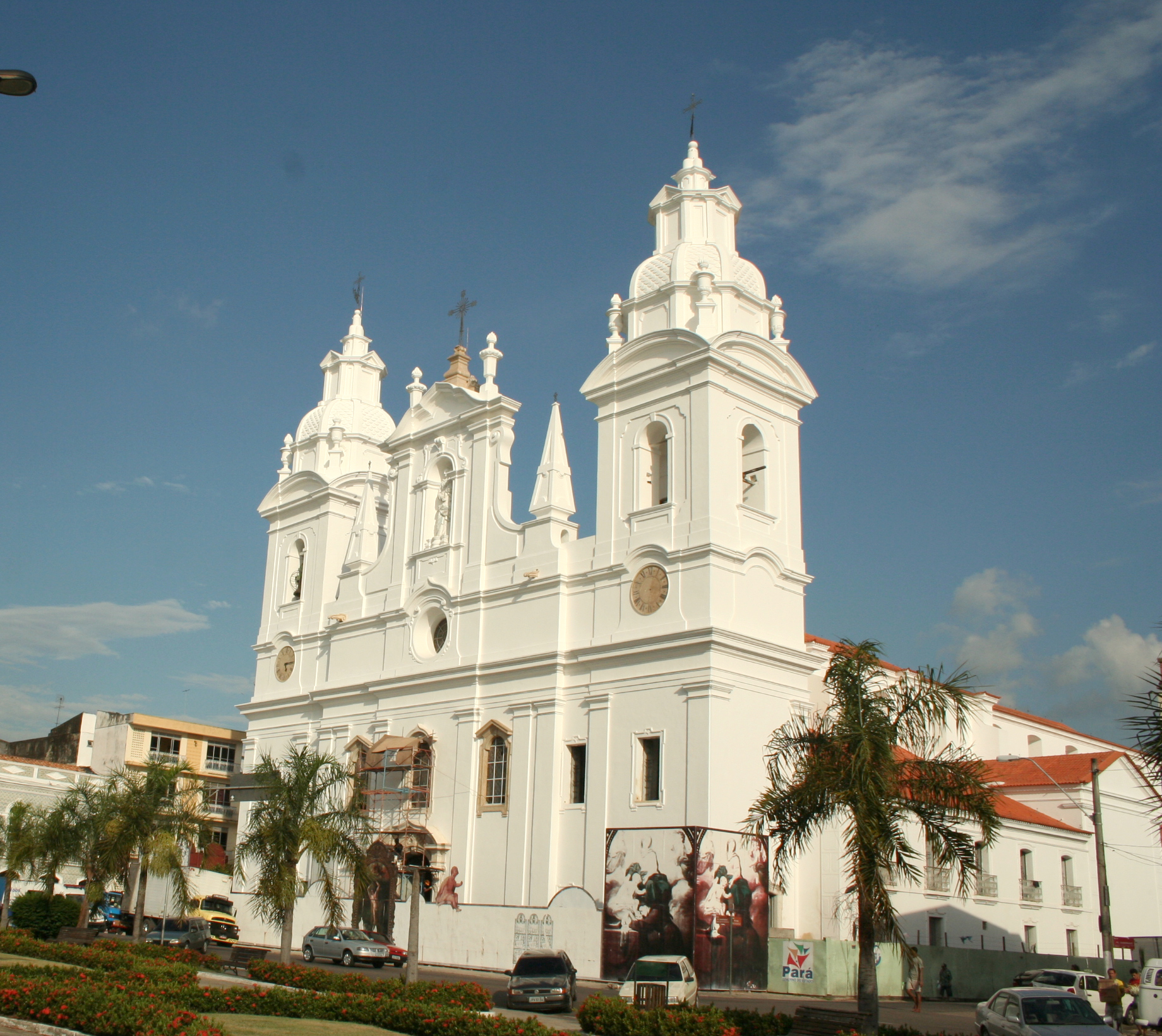
- Belém Cathedral

- Coat of arms

Location
- Country: Brazil
- Ecclesiastical province: Belém do Pará
- Coordinates: 1.4667°S 48.4833°W

Statistics
- Area: 2,082 km^{2} (804 sq mi)
- Population: Total; Catholics: (as of 2023); 3,014,965; 2,254,100 (74.8%)
- Parishes: 103

Information
- Denomination: Catholic Church
- Sui iuris church: Latin Church
- Rite: Roman Rite
- Established: 4 March 1720; 306 years ago
- Cathedral: Cathedral of Our Lady of Grace in Belém

Current leadership
- Pope: Leo XIV
- Metropolitan Archbishop: Júlio Endi Akamine, S.A.C.
- Auxiliary Bishops: Paolo Andreolli, S.X.
- Bishops emeritus: Alberto Taveira Corrêa

Website
- www.arquidiocesedebelem.com.br

The Roman Catholic Archdiocese of Belém do Pará (Latin: Archidioecesis Belemensis de Pará) is an archdiocese located in the city of Belém in Brazil. It covers 3,566,079 square kilometres (1,376,871 mi^{2}) and is organized into 80 parishes. The Archdiocese covers the municipalities of Belém, Ananindeua, Benevides, Marituba, and Santa Bárbara do Pará.

== History ==
- 4 March 1720: Established as Diocese of Belém do Pará from Diocese of São Luís do Maranhão
- 1 May 1906: Promoted as Metropolitan Archdiocese of Belém do Pará

== Special churches ==
- Minor Basilicas:
  - Basilica of Our Lady of Nazareth of Exile (Basílica Santuário Nossa Senhora de Nazaré)
- Cathedrals
  - Our Lady of the Conception Cathedral, Abaetetuba (Catedral Nossa Senhora da Conceição)
  - Our Lady of Grace Cathedral, Belém (Catedral Nossa Senhora das Graças)
- Historic churches
  - Church of Saint John the Baptist (Igreja de São João Batista)
  - Church of Our Lady of the Rosary (Igreja de Nossa Senhora do Rosário)

== Bishops ==
(all Roman Rite)

=== Episcopal ordinaries ===
==== Bishops of Belém do Pará ====
1. Bartolomeu do Pilar, OCarm (4 March 1720 – 9 April 1733)
2. Guilherme de São José Antonio de Aranha (3 September 1738 – 18 May 1748)
3. Miguel de Bulhões e Souza, OP (18 May 1748 – 24 March 1760)
4. João de São José de Queiroz da Silveira, OSB (24 March 1760 – 25 November 1763)
5. João Evangelista Pereira da Silva, TOR (17 June 1771 – 14 May 1782)
6. Cayetano Da Annunciação Brandão, TOR (16 December 1782 – 29 March 1790), appointed Archbishop of Braga
7. Manoel de Almeida de Carvalho (21 June 1790 – 30 June 1818)
8. Romualdo de Souza Coelho (28 August 1820 – 15 February 1841)
9. José Affonso de Moraes Torres, CM (22 January 1844 – 24 September 1857)
10. Antônio de Macedo Costa (17 December 1860 – 26 June 1890), appointed Archbishop of São Salvador da Bahia
11. Jerônimo Tomé da Silva (26 June 1890 – 12 September 1893), appointed Archbishop of São Salvador da Bahia
12. Antônio Manoel de Castilho Brandão (7 September 1894 – 5 June 1901), Appointed Bishop of Alagôas
13. Francisco do Rego Maia (5 June 1901 – 3 April 1906)
14. José Marcondes Homem de Melo (26 April 1906 – 1 May 1906 see below)

==== Archbishops of Belém do Pará ====
1. José Marcondes Homem de Melo (see above 1 May 1906 – 6 December 1906)
2. Santino Maria da Silva Coutinho (6 December 1906 – 19 January 1923), appointed Archbishop of Maceió, Alagoas
3. João Irineu Joffily (27 March 1924 – 1 May 1931)
4. Antônio de Almeida Lustosa, SDB (10 July 1931 – 19 July 1941), appointed Archbishop of Fortaleza, Ceara
5. Jaime de Barros Câmara (15 September 1941 – 3 July 1943), appointed Archbishop of São Sebastião do Rio de Janeiro (Cardinal in 1946)
6. Mário de Miranda Villas-Boas (10 September 1944 – 23 October 1956), appointed Coadjutor Archbishop of São Salvador da Bahia
7. Alberto Gaudêncio Ramos (9 May 1957 – 4 July 1990)
8. Vicente Joaquim Zico, CM (4 July 1990 – 13 October 2004)
9. Orani João Tempesta, OCist (13 October 2004 – 19 April 2009), appointed Archbishop of São Sebastião do Rio de Janeiro (Cardinal in 2014)
10. Alberto Taveira Corrêa (30 December 2009 – 6 August 2025)
11. Júlio Endi Akamine (since 6 August 2025)

=== Coadjutor Bishops ===
- Miguel de Bulhões e Souza, O.P. (1748)
- Vicente Joaquim Zico, C.M. (1980–1990)
- Júlio Endi Akamine, S.A.C. (2025)

=== Auxiliary Bishops ===
- Milton Corrêa Pereira (1962–1967), appointed Bishop of Garanhuns, Pernambuco
- Tadeu Henrique (Jude) Prost, O.F.M. (1962–1992)
- Alano Maria Pena, O.P. (1975–1976), appointed Coadjutor Prelate of Marabá, Para
- Carlos Verzeletti (1996–2004), appointed Bishop of Castanhal, Para
- Teodoro Mendes Tavares, C.S.Sp. (2011–2015), appointed Coadjutor Bishop of Ponta de Pedras, Para
- Irineu Roman, C.S.I. (2014–2019), appointed Archbishop of Santarém, Para
- Antônio de Assis Ribeiro, S.D.B. (2017–present)

=== Another priest of this diocese who became bishop ===
- Alberto Gaudêncio Ramos, appointed Bishop of Amazonas in 1948; later returned here as Archbishop.

== Suffragan dioceses ==
- Diocese of Abaetetuba
- Diocese of Bragança do Pará
- Diocese of Cametá, formerly Territorial Prelature of Cametá
- Diocese of Castanhal
- Diocese of Macapá
- Diocese of Marabá
- Diocese of Ponta de Pedras
- Diocese of Santíssima Conceição do Araguaia
- Territorial Prelature of Marajó

== Sources ==
- GCatholic.org
- Catholic Hierarchy
- Diocese website
