= Jalo Bhati =

- Village
- Location in Punjab, India Jalo Bhati (India)
- Coordinates: 31.296647°N 75.435929°E
- Country: India
- State: Punjab
- District: Kapurthala

Government
  - Type: Panchayati raj (India)
  - Body: Gram panchayat

Population (2011)
  - Total: 14
- Sex ratio 8/6♂/♀

Languages
  - Official: Punjabi
  - Other spoken: Hindi
- Time zone: UTC+5:30 (IST)
- PIN: 144601
- Telephone code: 01822
- ISO 3166 code: IN-PB
- Vehicle registration: PB-09
- Website: kapurthala.gov.in

Jalo Bhati is a village in Kapurthala district of Punjab State, India. It is located 9 kilometres (5.6 mi) from Kapurthala, which is both district and sub-district headquarters of Jalo Bhati. The village is administrated by a Sarpanch, who is an elected representative.

== Demography ==
According to the report published by Census India in 2011, Jalo Bhati has total number of 4 houses and population of 14 of which include 8 males and 6 females. Literacy rate of Jalo Bhati is 77.45%, higher than state average of 75.84%. The population of children under the age of 6 years is 1 which is 7.14% of total population of Jalo Bhati, and child sex ratio is approximately 0, lower than state average of 846.

== Population data ==
Particulars	Total	Male	Female
Total No. of Houses	4	-	-
Population	14	8	6
Child (0-6)	1	1	0
Schedule Caste	0	0	0
Schedule Tribe	0	0	0
Literacy	76.92 %	85.71 %	66.67 %
Total Workers	5	5	0
Main Worker	5	0	0
Marginal Worker	0	0	0

== Air travel connectivity ==
The closest airport to the village is Sri Guru Ram Dass Jee International Airport.
