= MC Tha =

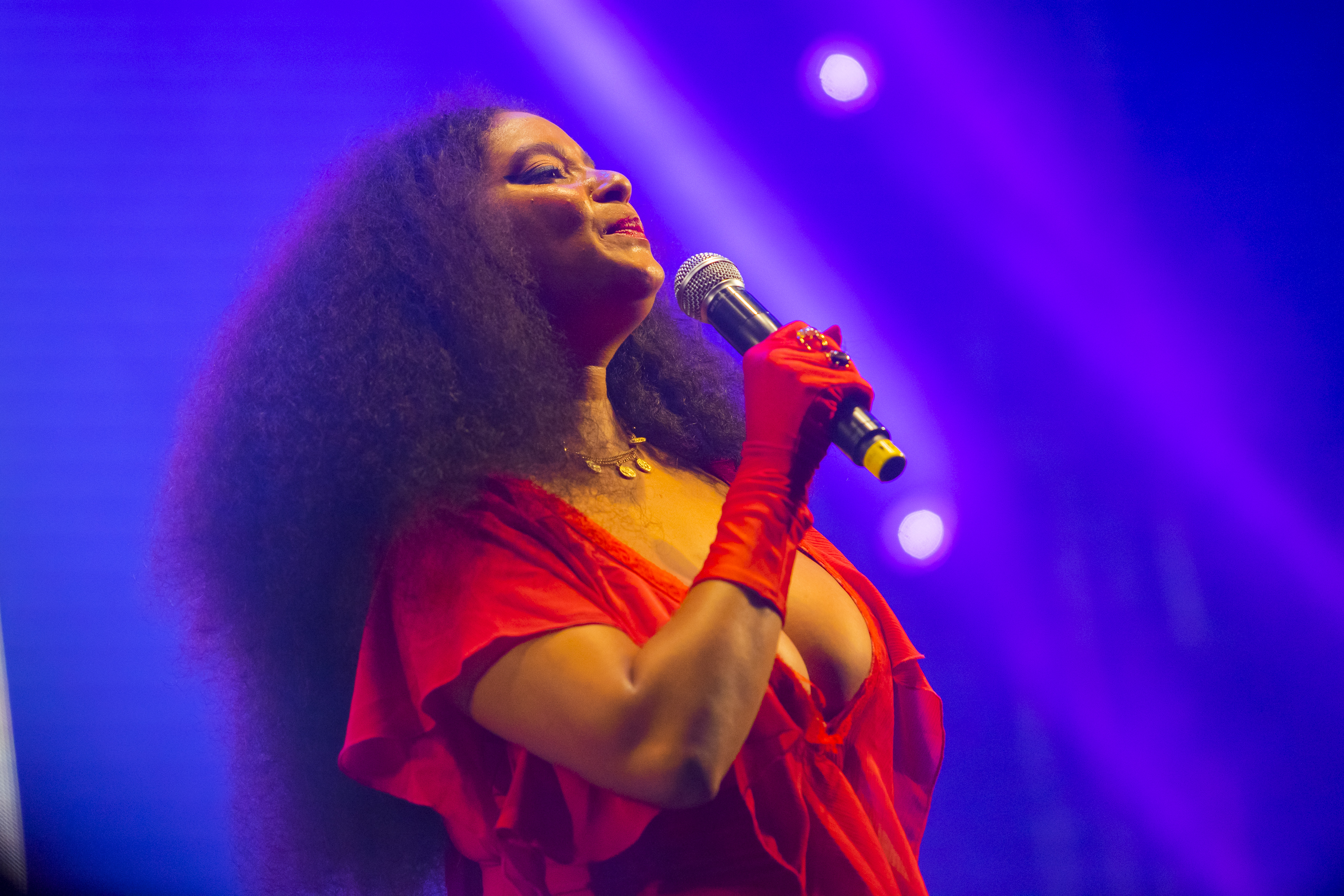

Background information
- Also known as: Tha
- Born: Thaís Dayane da Silva; May 7, 1993 (age 33); Tiradentes
- Occupations: Singer; songwriter; rapper
- Years active: 2005–present
- Label: Elemess
- Musical career
- Genres: Funk, funk ostentação, melodic funk, pop, hip-hop
- Instrument: Vocals
- Label: Elemess

Thaís Dayane da Silva (born 7 May 1993), known by the stage name MC Tha, is a Brazilian singer and songwriter.

== Biography ==
She was born in the neighborhood of Tiradentes, on the outskirts of the east side of São Paulo. Her parents separated when she was still a child, having a younger brother. Since childhood she liked to write poems. She grew up listening to different musical rhythms. At home, with her mother, she listened to samba, pagode and country music. When she visited her father, she listened to forró and brega.

Her debut album Rito de Passá was considered one of the 25 best Brazilian albums of the second half of 2019 by the São Paulo Association of Art Critics.

== Discography ==
- 2019: Rito de Passá
