= Castanhal =

- Municipality
- Municipality of Castanhal
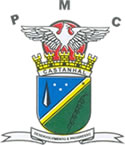
- Flag Coat of arms

- Location of Castanhal in the State of Pará

- Location in Brazil
- Coordinates: 01°17′49″S 47°55′19″W
- Country: Brazil
- Region: Northern
- State: Pará
- Demonym: castanhalense
- Founded: August 15, 1899
- City Established: January 28, 1932

Government
  - Mayor: Paulo Titan

Area
  - Total: 1,029.91 km^{2} (397.65 sq mi)
- Elevation: 141 m (463 ft)

Population (2022 Brazilian Census)
  - Total: 192,256
  - Estimate (2025): 209,126
  - Density: 186.673/km^{2} (483.480/sq mi)
- Time zone: UTC−3 (BRT)

Castanhal is a city near the eastern edge of the state of Pará, Northern Brazil. It is located some 65 km east of the state's capital Belém and 50 km inland SE of the Bay of Marajo. It is accessed by car or bus via federal highway BR-316 .The climate is tropical rainforest. With a population around 200,000, it is the fifth largest city in the state.

coordinates: 1° 18′ S, 47° 55′ W

== History ==
Castanhal was officially founded on January, 28th of 1932 (date of certification) and received its name due to the common nut trees (portug: Castanha) around the train station of the Bragança - Belém railway. Workers from the Brazilian Northeast started settling around the station. Local farmers started selling their products at the new market. Though, the new marketplace Castanhal was founded. The Bragança railway was shut down in 1964 and the rails were removed. The government of the state of Pará gave Castanhal the nickname "cidade modelo" (Model Town). In 2004, Pope John Paul II erected the diocese of Castanhal, which is subordinated as a suffragan diocese to the archdiocese of Belém, Pará.

== Education ==
Castanhal has become a regional center for education in the state of Pará. The educational level is well above the national average. There are eight secondary schools and three universities:

- Federal University of Pará, UFPA. Faculties of veterinary medicine, mathematics, sports, literature, pedagogy, computer science.
- University of Pará Uepa: mechanical engineering, agriculture, agricultural technology, physics, biology, pedagogy.
- FCAT Castanhal College. Agronomy faculties, business administration and marketing, computer science, pedagogy, history, biology.

== Economy ==
Due to its convenient geographic location, Castanhal has become an important trading spot for food and agricultural products (cereals, corn, maniok, pepper, palm oil), affecting the entire Northeastern part of the state and beyond.

Likewise Castanhal is becoming a hot spot for technology.

There are energy companies, specialized in high-voltage and high tech well drilling. Further, there is a factory producing work boots for food industry as well as an industry producing metallurgical equipment for mining companies.

== See also ==
- List of municipalities in Pará
- Roman Catholic Diocese of Castanhal
- Castanhal Esporte Clube
