= Toni Jalo =

Finnish ice hockey player

- Born: May 22, 1989 (age 37) Turku, Finland
- Height: 6 ft 1 in (185 cm)
- Weight: 196 lb (89 kg; 14 st 0 lb)
- Position: Forward
- Shot: Left
- Played for: HC TPS; TUTO; Vaasan Sport; Mikkelin Jukurit; HPK
- NHL draft: Undrafted
- Playing career: 2007–2016

Toni Jalo (born May 22, 1989) is a Finnish former professional ice hockey player. He last played for PaKa Kuusamo of the Finnish 2. Divisioona.

Jalo made his Liiga debut playing with TPS Turku during the 2007–08 Liiga season.
