= Jalo (name) =

Jalo is a Finnish given name and surname.

== Given name ==
- Jalo Heikkinen, writer
- Jalo Kalima, linguist, translator and professor
- Jalo Kilpinen, pole vaulter
- Jalo Syvähuoko, construction businessman

== Surname ==
- Marvi Jalo, writer
- Merja Jalo, writer
- Olli Jalo, photographer
- Risto Jalo, ice hockey player
- Toni Jalo, ice hockey player
