= Alberto Taveira Corrêa =

The Most Reverend Alberto Taveira Corrêa
- Archbishop Emeritus of Belém do Pará
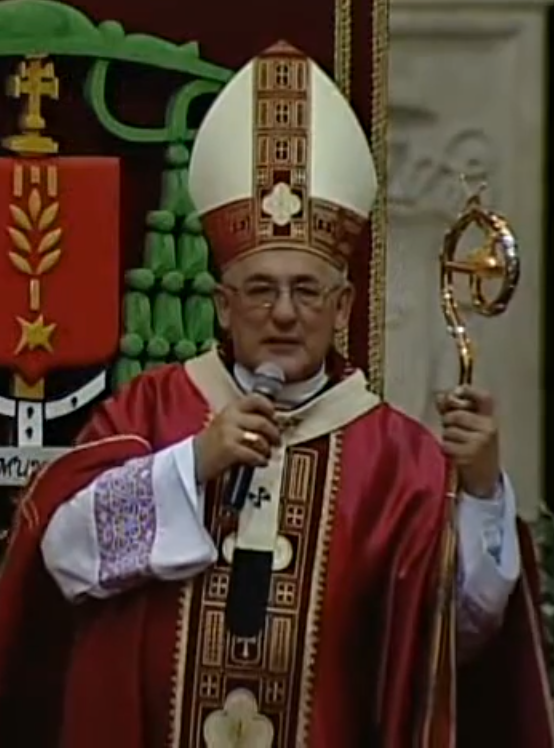
- Church: Roman Catholic Church
- Archdiocese: Belém do Pará
- See: Belém do Pará
- Appointed: 30 December 2009
- Installed: 25 March 2010
- Predecessor: Orani João Tempesta
- Previous posts: Titular Bishop of Sinnipsa (1991-96); Auxiliary Bishop of Brasília (1991-96); Archbishop of Palmas (1996-2009)

Orders
- Ordination: 15 August 1973 by João Resende Costa
- Consecration: 6 July 1991 by João Resende Costa

Personal details
- Born: Alberto Taveira Corrêa; 26 May 1950 (age 76) Nova Lima, Brazil
- Education: Pontifical Catholic University of Minas Gerais
- Motto: Pro mundi vita
- Coat of arms

Alberto Taveira Corrêa (born 26 May 1950) is a Brazilian prelate of the Roman Catholic Church. He served as auxiliary bishop of Brasília from 1991 till 1996, when he became archbishop of Palmas. In 2009 he became archbishop of Belém do Pará.

== Biography ==
Born in Nova Lima on 25 May 1950, Taveira Corrêa studied at the Pontifical Catholic University of Minas Gerais and was ordained to the priesthood of Belo Horizonte on 15 August 1973. After several years as pastor of Nossa Senhora do Pilar in Nova Lima and chaplain of the local hospital, he served from 1978 to 1984 as Rector of the major seminary while also filling assignments as coordinator of vocation ministry, member of the Presbyteral Council and of the College of Consultors. He was then worked as a priest in the parish of São Geraldo, as pastor of Senhor Bom Jesus in Bonfim and of Santo Antônio in Vargem Alegre and as District Vicar of Forania São Caetano.

On 24 April 1991, he was appointed auxiliary bishop of Brasília and titular bishop of Sinnipsa. Taveira Corrêa received his episcopal consecration on 6 July. The principal consecrator was João Resende Costa, archbishop emeritus of Belo Horizonte, with the archbishop of Belo Horizonte, Serafim Fernandes de Araújo, and the archbishop of Ribeirão Preto, Arnaldo Ribeiro, serving as co-consecrators.

On 27 March 1996, he was appointed Archbishop of Palmas. He was named archbishop of Archbishop of Belém do Pará on 30 December 2009. He was installed on 25 March 2010.

On 27 October 2012, Pope Benedict XVI named him a member of the Pontifical Council Cor Unum. On 6 February 2014, Pope Francis named him a consultor to the Pontifical Council for the Laity.

In 2014, he said that the annual Catholic procession and festival centered on an image of Mary as Our Lady of Nazareth, the Círio de Nazaré, attracted many non-Catholics, saying "Many people from other religious groups participate in Cirio and in it find a welcoming environment."

He participated in the Synod on the Amazonian Region in 2019 and served as moderator of one of its discussion circles.

== Selected works ==
His published works include:

- Segue-Me (in Portuguese). Loyola. 2002. ISBN 978-8515025763.
- E Cristo Que Vive Em Mim! (in Portuguese). Loyola. 2000. ISBN 978-8515016549.
- Deus nos ama de verdade (in Portuguese). Editora Canção Nova. 2015.
- Um Coração Para Amar (in Portuguese). Editora Canção Nova. 2016.
