= Our Lady of the Conception Cathedral, Abaetetuba =

Our Lady of the Conception Cathedral
- Catedral Nossa Senhora da Conceição
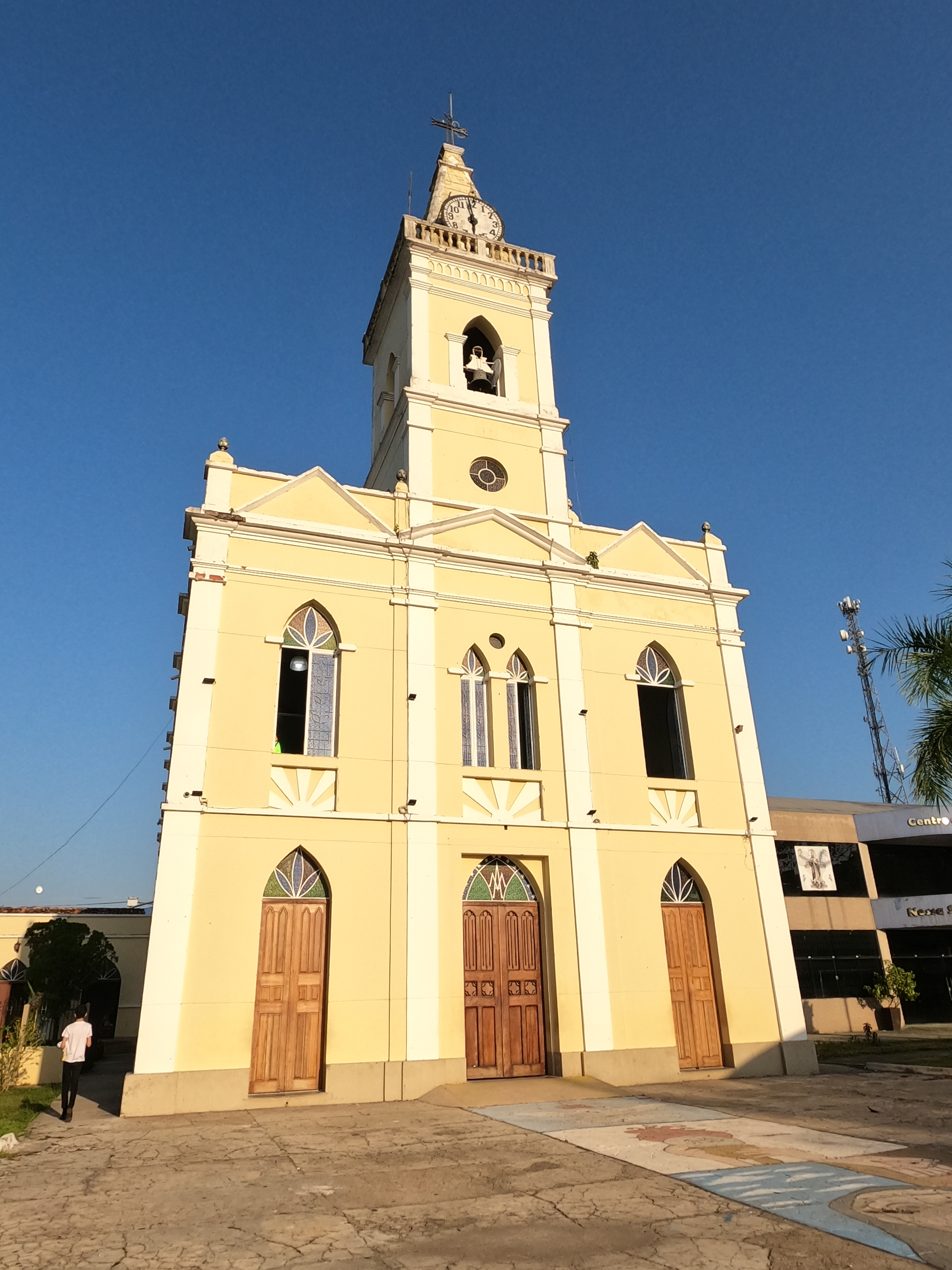
- Our Lady of the Conception Cathedral
- Location: Abaetetuba
- Country: Brazil
- Denomination: Roman Catholic Church

The Our Lady of the Conception Cathedral (Portuguese: Catedral Nossa Senhora da Conceição ) also called Abaetetuba Cathedral Is the main Catholic church of Abaetetuba, a city of the state of Pará, which is on the south bank of the Maratauíra river in the South American country of Brazil.

The church is the seat of the bishopric of the diocese of Abaetetuba. The temple dedicated to the Immaculate Conception was initiated by the will of Father Luiz Varella in the twenties and was almost completed under the supervision of Father Ignacio de Magalhães in 1936, after a series of fundraisers to promote the construction, Who were the first treasurers Francisco de Asunción dos Santos Rosado and Antonio de Castro. The directors of the work were the Spaniards Antonio Barbado and Galo Mouro.

The church was inaugurated in 1939, but in 1940 the image of the Immaculate Conception was transferred. Capuchin parents enlarged the church, and in 1942 the clock tower and bells were modified. In the sixties the Xaverian Fathers transformed the church into a cathedral centered on devotion to Jesus Christ and for this reason many images that were formerly of the popular devotion were removed from the interiors.

== See also ==
- Roman Catholicism in Brazil
