= Jaloo, Mansehra =

Coordinates: 34°19′0″N 73°9′0″E

Jaloo
- Village and union council
- Interactive map of Jaloo
- Country: Pakistan
- Region: Khyber-Pakhtunkhwa
- District: Mansehra
- Time zone: UTC+5 (PST)

Jaloo is a village and union council (an administrative subdivision) of Mansehra District in Khyber-Pakhtunkhwa province of Pakistan. It is located in Mansehra Tehsil at 34°19'0N 73°9'0E and has an altitude of 1008 metres (3310).
