= Antônio de Macedo Costa =

Brazilian priest

Archbishop Antônio de Macedo Costa
- Archbishop of São Salvador; Primate of Brazil
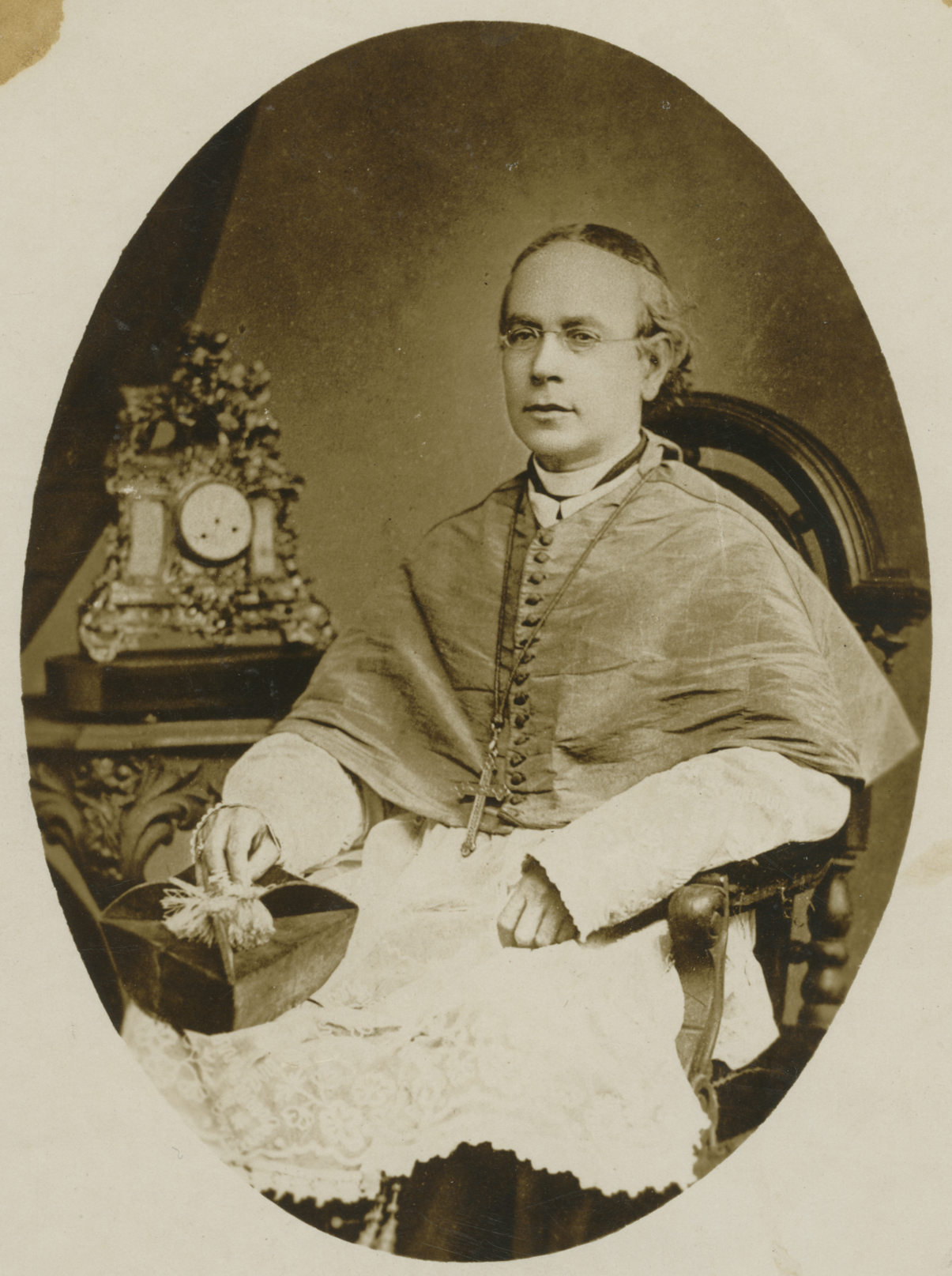
- Church: Roman Catholic Church
- Archdiocese: São Salvador da Bahia
- Appointed: 26 June 1890
- Predecessor: Luís Antônio dos Santos
- Successor: Jerônimo Tomé da Silva

Personal details
- Born: 7 August 1830 Maragogipe, Bahia, Empire of Brazil
- Died: 20 March 1891 (aged 60) Barbacena, Minas Gerais, Brazil

Archbishop Antônio de Macedo Costa (7 Aug 1830 – 20 Mar 1891) was Archbishop of São Salvador da Bahia and previously Bishop of Pará. He had been present at the First Vatican Council as a council father. While Bishop of Pará he had been imprisoned for his role in the Religious Issue.
