= Júlio Endi Akamine =

Brazilian Roman Catholic archbishop

Most Reverend Júlio Endi Akamine
- Archbishop of Belém do Pará
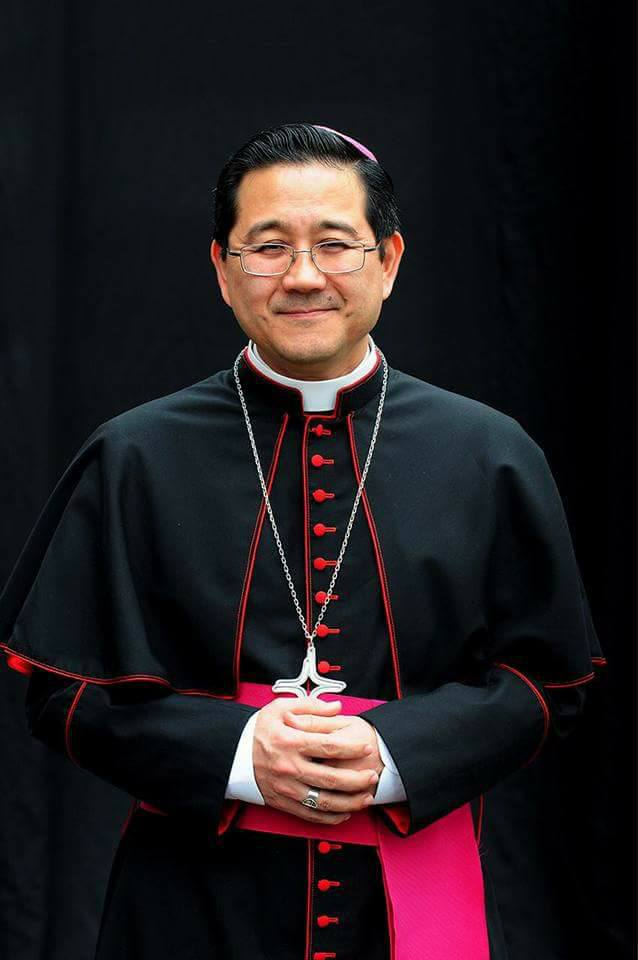
- Archdiocese: Belém do Pará
- Predecessor: Alberto Taveira Corrêa
- Previous posts: Archbishop of Sorocaba (2016-2025); Auxiliary Bishop of São Paulo (2011-2016); Titular Bishop of Thagamuta (2011-2016)

Orders
- Ordination: 24 January 1988
- Consecration: 9 July 2011 by Odilo Pedro Scherer

Personal details
- Born: November 20, 1962 (age 63) Garça, Brazil
- Denomination: Roman Catholic
- Motto: "BONUM FACIENTES INFATIGABILES" (Não vos canseis de fazer o Bem)
- Coat of arms: Júlio Endi Akamine's coat of arms

Júlio Endi Akamine, S.A.C. (Garça, November 20, 1962) is a Brazilian Catholic archbishop. He is the metropolitan archbishop elect of Belém do Pará. He was previously the Coadjutor of the same archdiocese, and the Metropolitan Archbishop of Sorocaba prior to that (2016–2025). Akamine is the first Japanese Brazilian named bishop in Brazil. He was auxiliary bishop of São Paulo and responsible for the Lapa Episcopal Region.

== Biography ==
Born in Garça in 1962, Akamine made his profession of faith to the Pallottine priests on December 8, 1980. In Curitiba he studied philosophy at the Pontifical Catholic University (1981-1983) and Theology at the Studium Teologicum Claretianum (1984-1987) and was ordained priest on January 24, 1988.

In addition, he obtained the License (1993-1996) and the Doctorate (2002-2005) in Dogmatic Theology at the Pontifical Gregorian University in Rome.

On 4 May 2011 he was appointed by Pope Benedict XVI auxiliary bishop of the Archdiocese of São Paulo and Titular Bishop of Thagamuta. On July 9, 2011, Akamine was ordained bishop by Cardinal Archbishop of São Paulo, Odilo Pedro Scherer and his co-consecrators were Edmar Peron, Titular Bishop of Mattiana and Tarcísio Scaramussa, S.D.B., Titular Bishop of Segia.

On 28 December 2016 he was appointed by Pope Francis as Archbishop of Sorocaba and took office on February 25, 2017.
