= Neo-Thomism in Brazil =

Philosophical and theological tradition

Neo-Thomism in Brazil describes Brazilian philosophers' experience of and contribution to the religious philosophy known as Neo-Thomism, the revival and development of medieval Scholasticism in Catholic theology and scholastic philosophy which began in the second half of the 19th century in Europe.

During the Colonial era tertiary education in Brazil was limited to several clerical institutions, typically founded and directed by the Society of Jesus. Consequently, Brazilian Scholasticism was never able to assert a notable influence and had almost disappeared by the end of the 18th century. However, more than a hundred years later the Neo-Scholastic movement arrived in the country in the early 20th century and attempted a revitalization of the traditional philosophy of Thomism, propagated by a number of Brazilian Catholic philosophers.

== First appearances: pre-1930 ==
Unlike neighbouring Hispanic-American countries, Brazil did not establish universities until 1920, and so during the Colonial era tertiary education was limited to several clerical institutions, typically founded and directed by the Society of Jesus. Because of this, Brazilian Scholasticism was never able to assert a notable influence and had almost disappeared by the end of the 18th century.

Probably the earliest appearance of Neo-Thomism in Brazil was the publication of Lições de Filosofía Elementar, Racional e Moral by José Soriano de Souza (1833–1895) in Recife in 1871, eight years before the Aeterni Patris encyclical. De Souza was not a cleric but a lay physician who had studied philosophy at Leuven and worked as a teacher at the Recife School of Law. Presenting views close to those of Matteo Liberatore and Ceferino González, in the book he attacked Rationalism, rejected the possibility of creating a new order based on reason without taking God into account, and thoroughly developed the relationship between faith and reason. But despite the highly innovative nature of the text considering Thomism's relative absence in the Brazilian context, it did not have a lasting influence.

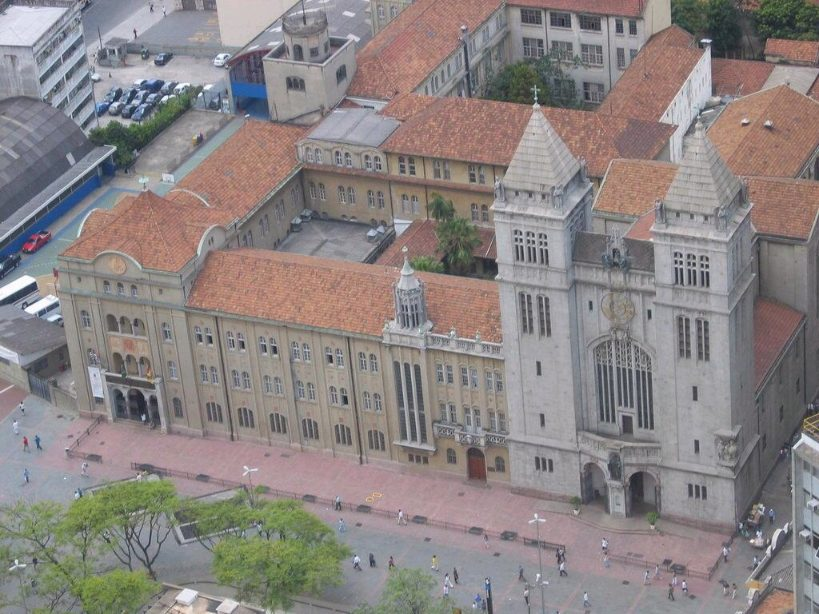
Mosteiro de São Bento, São Paulo

The pioneering institution in teaching Catholic philosophy to laymen in Brazil – and neo-Thomism in particular – was the Paulistan School of Philosophy of São Bento, founded in 1908 by the German Benedictine abbot Miguel Kruse and attached to the Catholic University of Louvain from 1911. This institution had the explicit objective of countering the propagation of utilitarianism and positivism in the country, and promoted Neo-Thomism as its main doctrinal trend.

The main figures of the school were Belgian priests Carlos Sentroul (1876–1933) and his successor Leonardo Van Acker (1896–1986). Sentroul was the co-founder of the School and a lecturer until 1917, when he returned to Belgium. He favored a moderate approach, and despite his Neo-Thomistic convictions promoted an administration focused less on apologetics. In his inauguration address in 1908 he asked the audience to not be prejudiced against "our adversaries" and called for the teaching of figures such as Duns Scotus, Comte, and Kant in order to "refute errors and recognize truths". Similarly, Van Acker championed a critical assessment of Thomism which took into account that every philosophical system was subject to errors. His studies were largely devoted to Henri Bergson and were built on the premise of a philosophical pluralism which promoted the conciliation between Thomism and modern thought. The views of both thinkers have been described as contrary to the dominant apologetic focus assumed by Catholic philosophers both in Brazil and the rest of the world at that time.

== Traditional Thomists: 1930–1965 ==
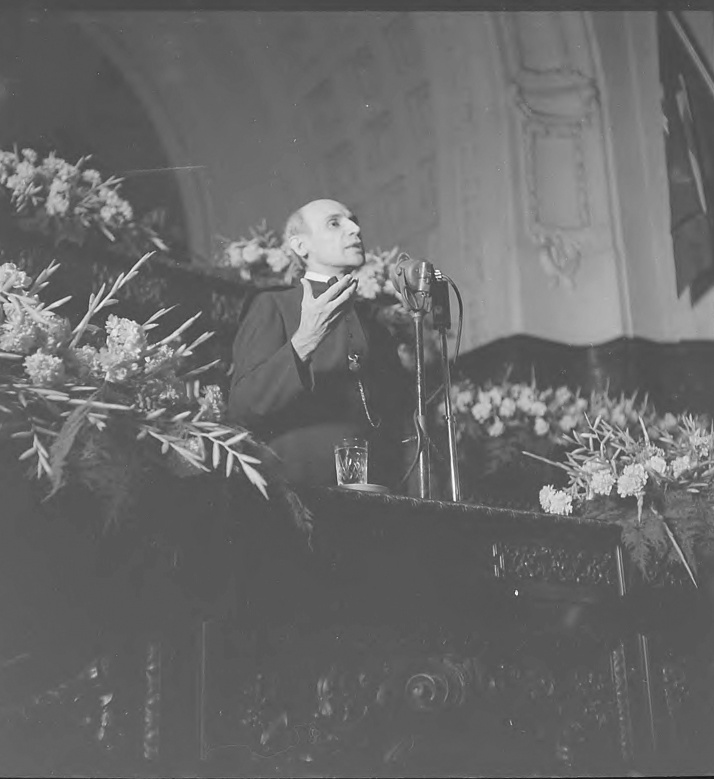
Leonel Franca giving a speech (1940)

A more belligerent defender of traditional Thomism than Sentroul and Van Acker was Leonel Franca, the first rector of the Pontifical Catholic University of Rio de Janeiro, founded in 1940, which had evolved from the Instituto Católico de Estudos Superiores, founded in 1932. The University of Rio was founded by cardinal Sebastião da Silveira Cintra, was directed by the Jesuits, and aimed at following the line of the Gregorian University. In 1918 Franca had published the manual "Noções de História da Filosofia" (lit. 'Concepts of the History of Philosophy') which defended Thomism and critiqued philosophical schools designated as "modernist" by the Catholic Church. For a long time it was one of the few philosophy textbooks published in Portuguese and thus proved highly influential in the teaching of both laymen and priests at seminaries. Styled as a "strict-observance Thomist", Franca's body of writing extends to 15 volumes, of which the most notable is A crise do mundo moderno (lit. 'The Crisis of the Modern World').

Another relevant figure from the Pontifical Catholic University was the Benedictine monk Tomás Keller, who not only advanced Neo-Thomism through his comparative studies in Leibnizianism, but also became a key promoter of the Liturgical Movement in Brazil. Keller became famous for his speeches asking for liturgical renewal at the Rio de Janeiro Monastery, which numerous Catholic intellectuals and students attended. Thomism was also promoted at Rio by Maurílio Teixeira-Leite Penido, a Brazilian priest who had returned to his country after years serving as a professor at Fribourg. Despite being a specialist in modern philosophy Penido had studied Thomas Aquinas – albeit mostly through commentators like Thomas Cajetan – and had developed comparative studies between Scholasticism and other currents of thought.

A less conservative intellectual school of philosophy was that of the Pontifical Catholic University of São Paulo, which was founded in 1946 after annexing the School of São Bento. Sao Paulo had already seen the rise of a number of Catholic philosophical institutions such as the Sociedade de Filosofia e Letras de São Paulo, founded in 1930, and the Faculdade de Filosofia Sedes Sapientiae, founded in the early 1940s. The latter would become famous after publishing the first edition of the Summa Theologica in modern Portuguese, translated by Alexandre Corrêa. Despite holding to a remarkable orthodoxy regarding Catholic social teaching, the aforementioned institutions were closer to the line of Van Acker and Sentroul in attempting a critical and comparative approach to Thomism instead of the apologetic trend championed by Franca.

Conservative Neo-Thomism also found a key lay defender in the convert Jackson de Figueiredo (1891–1928). The founder of the A Ordem magazine and a member of the Centro Dom Vital intellectual circle, Figueiredo adopted an extremely belligerent position as a Catholic apologist. A self-described intolerant, his views were probably influenced by those of Joseph de Maistre, Charles Maurras, and Blaise Pascal.

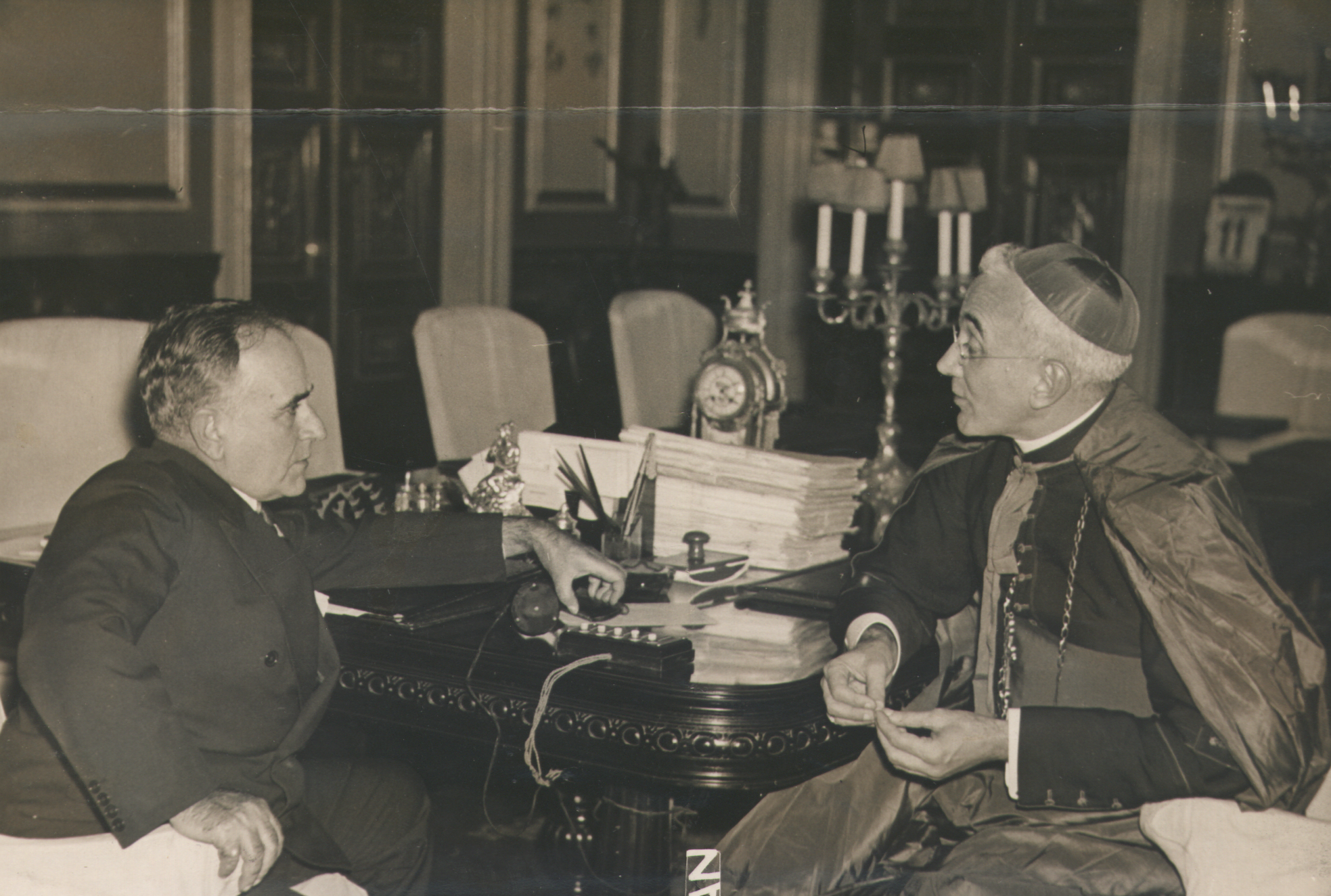
Getúlio Vargas and Francisco de Aquino Correia (1938)

== The influence of Maritain ==
Brazilian Neo-Thomism experienced an internal controversy after the arrival there of Jacques Maritain's philosophy in the 1930s. It coincided with the 1930 Brazilian coup d'état and the subsequent rise to power of Getúlio Vargas, an agnostic politician who nevertheless promoted a rapprochement between the Catholic Church and the government. Maritain's progressive views, along with his support of Christian democracy and his condemnation of authoritarianism, caused a division between those who either commended or condemned his widely popularized thought. The O Legionário newspaper of the Archdiocese of São Paulo, presided over by the well-known anti-liberal Duarte Leopoldo e Silva, became an outspoken critic of Maritain, while traditional institutions of Catholic activism such as those of the Centro Dom Vital abandoned their historical integralist approach and followed the French thinker in his democratic ideals.

The rise of Maritain's political thought was also coincident with the gradual development of a lay Catholic intellectual elite, in which relevant religious activists like Alceu Amoroso Lima – who led the Centro Dom Vital to its ideological shift – would find a place. The ideas of Maritain were quickly propagated through the country, and became dominant in important Catholic institutions such as the Instituto Católico de Estudos Superiores, the Coligação Católica Brasileira, the Confederação Nacional de Operários Católicos, the Equipes Sociais, the Associação de Bibliotecas Católicas and the Ação Universitária Católica.

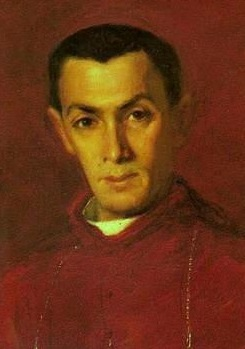
Duarte Leopoldo e Silva (1913), by Henri Bernard

The conflict between supporters and critics of Maritain had lasting consequences in the intellectual history of Paulistan Thomists in Brazil. Intense disagreement among the local clergy led Archbishop Carlos Carmelo Vasconcellos Motta to close O Legionário following the controversy. But in spite of these quarrels, Iberian-American Neo-Scholasticism has been described as peaking between the 1940s and 1960s. This golden age was marked by a "vertiginous" growth of Catholic education, both through the creation of new institutions and by the development of already established ones. By 1956 Brazil had 35 Catholic faculties of "philosophy, sciences and literature", amounting to 65% of all such institutions in the country. Most teaching positions in these institutions were taken by priests due to the lack of trained professors, which caused Thomism to flourish as the main school of thought during those years. However, these priests' rudimentary intellectual formation led to questioning of their suitability for such positions, and their inability to develop an autonomous intellectual movement independent from the use of European manuals has been pointed out as diminishing the quality of Brazilian Thomism.

Even so, many notable works on Thomistic philosophy were produced in this period, including Itinerário para a verdade (1955) by Ubaldo Puppi and Um capítulo da história do tomismo (1962) by Carlos Lopes de Matos, as well as the first Brazilian translations of De ente et essentia by José Cretela Jr. and of De regno, ad regem Cypri by Arlindo Veiga dos Santos. The translation of the Summa contra Gentiles had already been started by Ludgero Jaspers in the 1930s but was not published until the 1990s.

== Post-Second Vatican Council: since 1965 ==
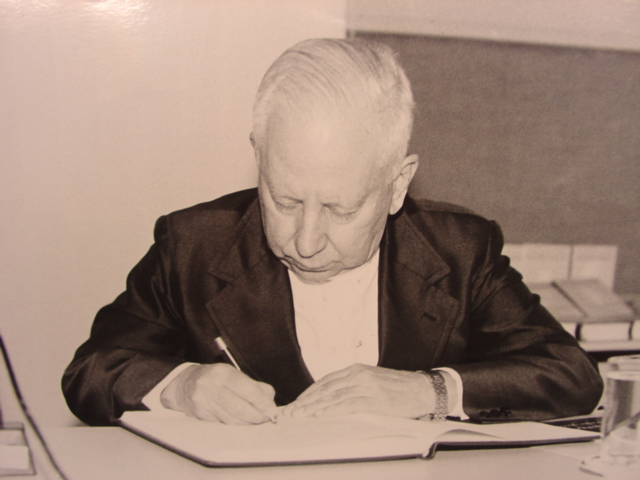
Lima Vaz (1921–2002), Jesuit priest and philosopher

Brazilian Thomism experienced a number of changes after the Second Vatican Council (1962-1965) which were key to its popularization in the context of a rising promotion of Latin American liberation theology. The main intellectual figure in this period of Brazilian philosophy was the Jesuit priest Henrique Cláudio de Lima Vaz, who vindicated Aquinas' contributions in light of the role of human beings in Heidegger's philosophy of being, and of the centrality of history in Hegelianism.

Numerous Thomistic works were translated into Portuguese in Brazil during this period. Three new translations of De ente et essentia were produced by João L. Baraúna, Odilão Moura and Carlos A. R. Nascimento in 1973, 1981, and 1995. A new 11-volume edition of the Summa Theologica was published between 1980 and 1981 by Luís Alberto de Boni, an instrumental figure in the translated edition of the Summa contra Gentiles, which he published along with Moura between 1990 and 1996 in a bilingual format. Moura also translated the Devotissima expositio super symbolum apostolorum in 1975 and the Compendium Theologiae in 1978. Nascimento contributed with a number of texts, of which the most notable was the Expositio super librum Boethii De Trinitate in 1999 and a new edition of De regno in 1997. The publishing of A imperfeição intelectiva do espírito humano by Luciano Mendes de Almeida in 1977 was also a landmark.

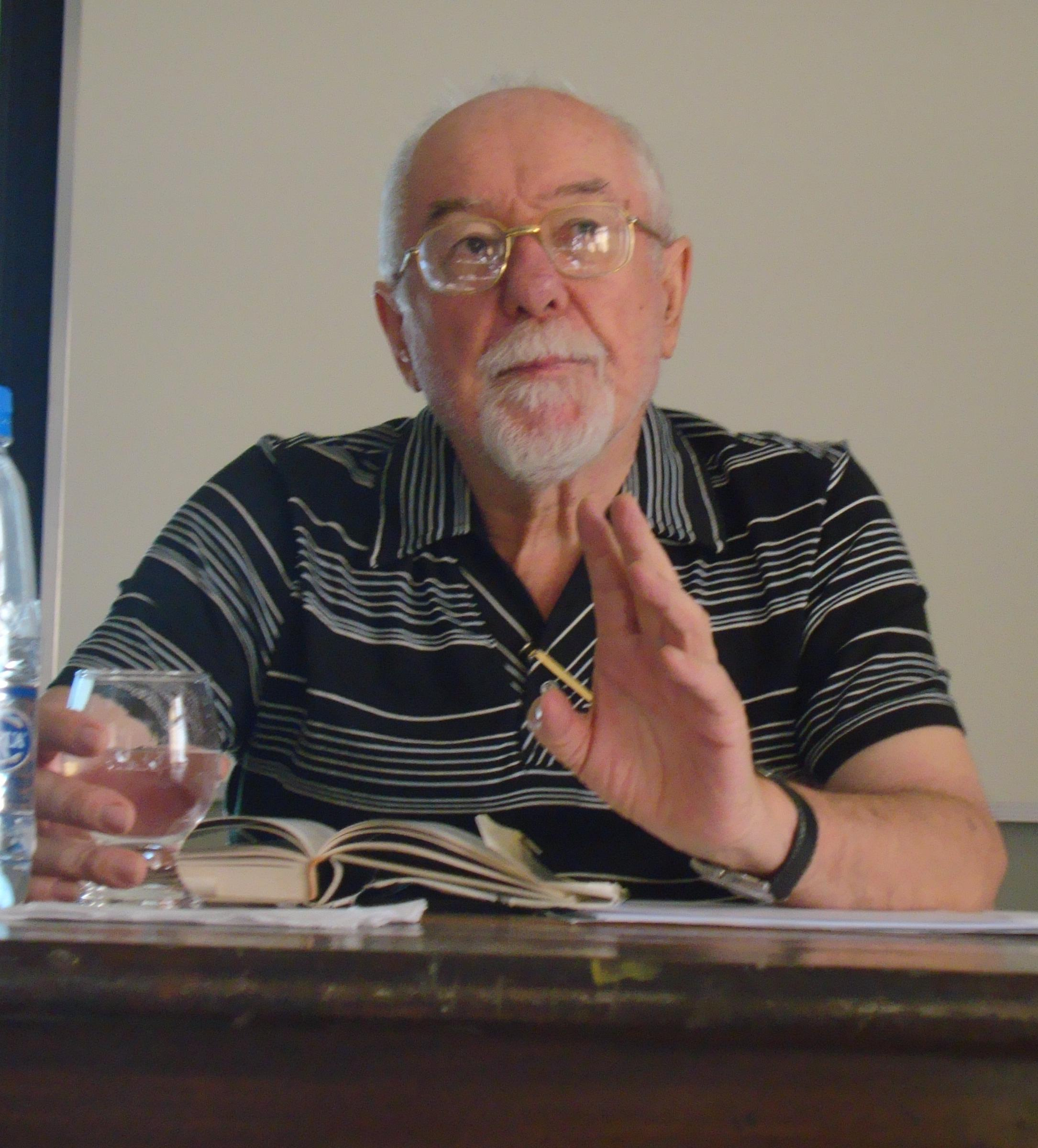
Luís Alberto de Boni, Brazilian philosopher and translator

De Boni was an important promoter of the study of medieval philosophy in Brazil after the 1970s. An ex-Capuchin friar and Doctor of Philosophy, he returned to Brazil after finishing his studies in Germany and promoted the movement of other intellectuals to the country. De Boni served as president of the Brazilian Commission of Medieval Philosophy and worked extensively to improve the availability of content regarding medieval thought in Brazilian libraries, also publishing a large number of articles and compilations on the subject. The main reference work on medieval philosophy in Brazil, Filosofia e Filosofias na Idade Media, was published by Celestino Pires in 1982 in order to help at a series of meetings about the subject at the University of Brasília. The Brazilian Society of Medieval Philosophy was also founded in this period.

The developers of Thomism in Brazil after the Second Vatican Council have been categorized as belonging to three trends: the "traditionalists"; the "progressives"; and the "reformulators". Among the traditionalists, the main exponents of the movement were Gustavo Corção and Carlos Nougué.

The only Brazilian academic journal specifically dedicated to medieval philosophy currently is the Scintilla, established in 2004 and published by the Franciscans of Curitiba.

== See also ==
- Catholic Church in Brazil
- Religious Issue

== Bibliography ==
- Coelho Espíndola, Aguinaldo (2019). O direito natural em São Tomás de Aquino e sua repercussão no Brasil: o tomismo nos manuais brasileiros de introdução ao estudo do direito (Master of Laws thesis) (in Portuguese). Centro Universitário de Brasília.
- Culleton, Alfredo Santiago (2009-06-26). "A filosofia medieval no Brasil e no Rio Grande do Sul". Revista Aedos (in Portuguese). 2 (2). ISSN 1984-5634.
- Domínguez Miranda, Manuel (2015-12-03). "Enfoques para una historia de la Filosofía Cristiana en América Latina SS. XVIII a XX". Universitas Philosophica (in Spanish). 32 (65): 15–35. doi:10.11144/javeriana.uph32-65.ehfc. hdl:10554/31916. ISSN 2346-2426.
- Soares, Edvaldo (2014). Pensamento católico brasileiro: influências e tendências (in Portuguese). Marília : São Paulo: Oficina Universitária ; Cultura Acadêmica Editora. ISBN 978-85-7983-577-3. OCLC 1097355925.
