= National Faculty of Philosophy =

Defunct academic division in Brazil

- Faculdade Nacional de Filosofia
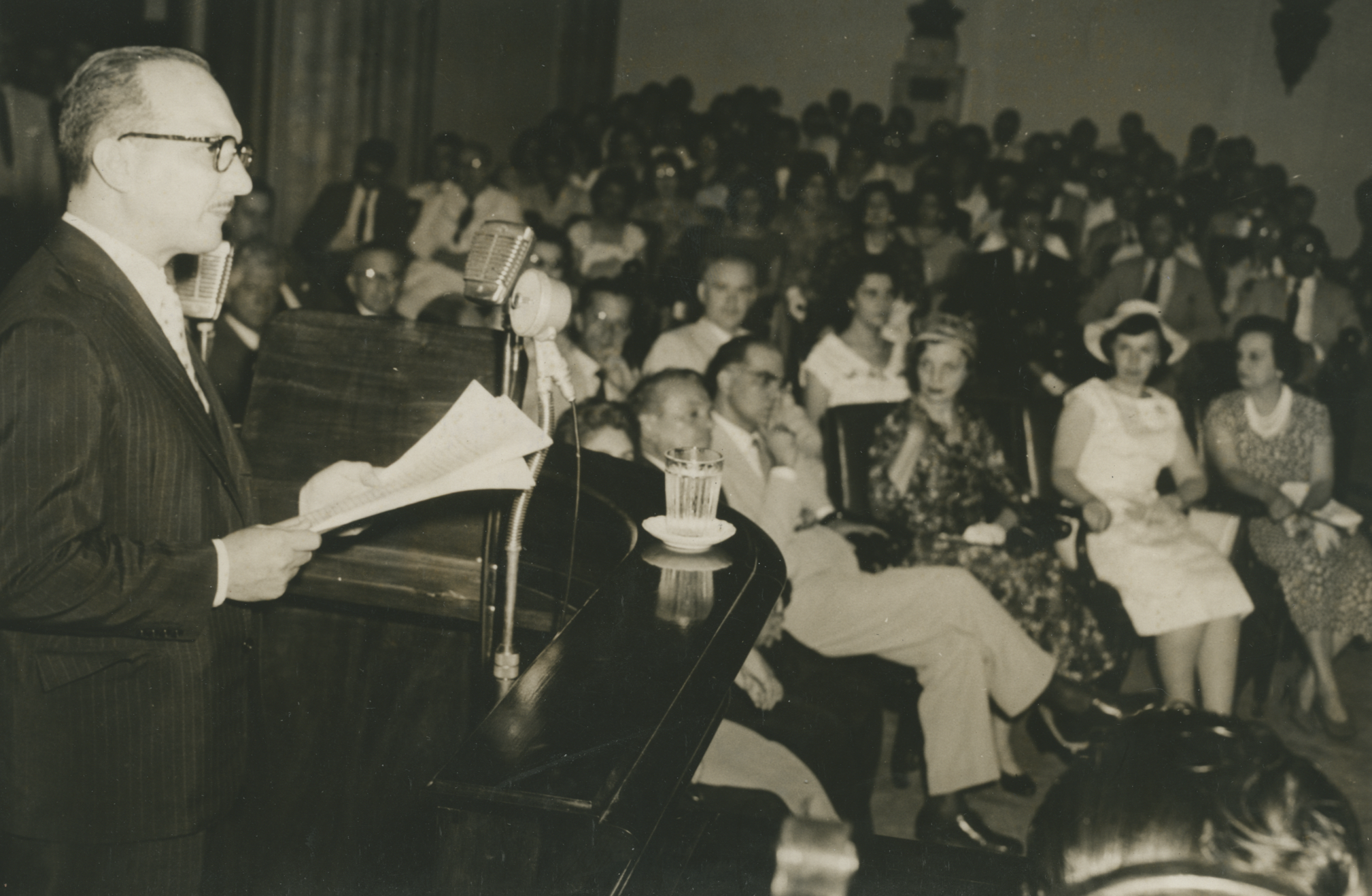
- Victor Nunes Leal, chair professor of political science, lecturing at FNFi
- Type: Public undergraduate faculty
- Active: 1939–1968
- Founder: Getúlio Vargas
- Parent institution: University of Brazil
- Academic staff: 65 professors and 53 assistants (1949)
- Undergraduates: 950 (1949)
- Location: Avenida Presidente Antônio Carlos, Centro, Rio de Janeiro, RJ, Brazil
- Campus: Urban

The National Faculty of Philosophy (Portuguese: Faculdade Nacional de Filosofia, FNFi) was a unit of the University of Brazil located in Rio de Janeiro.

Founded in April 1939 by a federal decree restructuring the short-lived University of the Federal District (UDF), the Faculty was designed with the purpose of educating technicians, teachers, researchers, and bureaucrats in a context of economic and industrial expansion. It was divided into four ordinary sections (philosophy, sciences, letters, and pedagogy) offering courses ranging from chemistry to sociology.

Envisioned as a model for other universities in Brazil, then a country with an incipient academic tradition, the Faculty counted among its teaching staff eminent Brazilian intellectuals, as well as French and Italian professors. At the time, foreign academics were also commonly employed at the newly-established Faculty of Philosophy, Languages and Human Sciences of the University of São Paulo.

The Faculty, inspired by New School ideals, such as active and experiential learning, pioneered many aspects of Brazilian higher education, including the introduction of a pedagogy program, reforms to the literature and mathematics curricula, and a greater focus on academic research, notably in the fields of genetics, physics, and history. It also modernized the teaching of philosophy, which had formerly been under the influence of the Catholic church, especially the Jesuits.

Attracting students from across all regions of Brazil, it became a center of student activism throughout the 1950s and 1960s, which in turn made the institution a focus of resistance to the military dictatorship, with many of its professors and students targeted by State persecution.

For many decades, the Faculty was a benchmark for other academic institutions in Brazil, setting standards for both the quality and structure of courses.

Following the university reform enacted by the military regime in 1968, the faculty was shuttered and reorganized into several institutions that currently make up the Federal University of Rio de Janeiro. These new institutions include the School of Communication [pt], the Faculties of Education [pt] and Letters [pt], as well as the Institutes of Biology [pt], Physics [pt], Geosciences [pt], Chemistry [pt], and Mathematics.

== Staff ==
Notable people who worked at the Faculty include:

=== Directors ===
- San Tiago Dantas, director
- Francisco de Assis Barbosa, associate director

=== Professors ===
- Alceu Amoroso Lima, Brazilian literature
- Antonio Monteiro, mathematics
- César Lattes, atomic and nuclear physics
- Darcy Ribeiro, ethnology and Tupi language
- Joaquim da Costa Ribeiro, general and experimental physics
- Josué de Castro, human geography
- Manuel Bandeira, Hispano-American literatures
- Maurílio Teixeira-Leite Penido, philosophy, gnosiology, and metaphysics
- Sérgio Buarque de Holanda, Modern and Contemporary history

=== Other roles ===
- Otto Maria Carpeaux, library director

== Alumni ==
Notable alumni include:

- Antonio Paim, philosopher
- Bertha Becker, geographer
- Carlos Heitor Cony, writer
- Elisa Lispector, writer
- Esther Largman, writer
- Guerreiro Ramos, sociologist
- Ivan Junqueira, literary critic
- Jayme Tiomno, physicist
- João Camilo de Oliveira Torres, writer
- Joaquim Pedro de Andrade, film director
- Jorge Anderé Swieca, physicist
- José Leite Lopes, physicist
- José Ramos Tinhorão, music historian
- Keti Tenenblat, mathematician
- Maria Laura Moura Mouzinho Leite Lopes, mathematician
- Marília Chaves Peixoto, mathematician
- Oswaldo Frota-Pessoa, geneticist
- Paulo Francis, journalist
- Paulo Ribenboim, mathematician
- Ruy Castro, writer
- Sérgio Mascarenhas de Oliveira, physicist

== See also ==
- Education in Brazil
- Universities and higher education in Brazil
