= Reimund Gerhard =

German physicist and university professor

Reimund Gerhard (born 31 May 1952 in Heidelberg) is a German applied physicist and university professor. Between 1979 and 2006 he used the last name "Gerhard-Multhaupt".

== Education ==
Gerhard graduated from the Technical University of Darmstadt as Diplom-Physiker in 1978 and was a research student with Martin M. Perlman (1930–2013) in 1978/79. In 1984, he obtained his Ph.D. with Gerhard M. Sessler at the Technical University of Darmstadt.

== Career ==
From 1985 until 1994, Gerhard was scientist and project manager at the Heinrich-Hertz-Institut fuer Nachrichtentechnik (now Fraunhofer Institute for Telecommunications) Berlin in the department led by Gerhard Mahler. In 1994 and 1996, he was appointed university professor for sensorics and for applied condensed-matter physics of the University of Potsdam.

From 1997 until 2000, Gerhard served as director of the institute of physics and astronomy, from 2006 to 2008 as vice dean, and from 2008 to 2012 as dean of the faculty of science at the university. Between 2004 and 2012, he chaired the joint board of the master-of-science program in polymer science at the four universities with science faculties in Berlin and Potsdam. From 2014 until 2016 he was a member of the university senate in Potsdam. He has undertaken visiting appointments at Bell Laboratories in Murray Hill, NJ, USA (1981, 1982, 1983), at the Tongji University in Shanghai, China (1987 and 1989), at the École Normal Supérieure (ENS) in Cachan, France (1995/96 and 2014/15), at the University of São Paulo (USP) in São Carlos, Brazil (1999, 2005–06, 2012), at the École Supérieure de Physique et de Chimie Industrielles (ESPCI) in Paris, France (1999), at the Hebrew University of Jerusalem, Israel (HUJI) (2013), at the Xi'an Jiaotong University (XJTU) in Xi'an, China (2015, 2017, 2019), and at Chongqing University in Chongqing, China (2018 and 2019).

Gerhard served as secretary of the 5th IEEE International Symposium on Electrets (ISE) in Heidelberg (1985), co-chair of the 7th IEEE International Symposium on Electrets (ISE) in Berlin (1991), chair of the 10th IEEE International Conference on Solid Dielectrics (ICSD) in Potsdam (2010) and chair of the 2nd International Conference on Electromechanically Active Polymers (EuroEAP) in Potsdam (2012). He was the vice president for technical activities of the IEEE Dielectrics and Electrical Insulation Society (DEIS) in 2007–2008 and 2014–2015. From January 2018 through December 2019 he served as president of the IEEE Dielectrics & Electrical Insulation Society (DEIS).

His research portfolio includes polymer electrets with quasi-permanent space charge, ferro- or piezoelectrets (polymer films with electrically charged cavities), ferroelectric polymers with piezo- and pyroelectric properties, polymer composites with novel property combinations, physical mechanisms of dipole orientation and charge storage, electrically deformable dielectric elastomers (sometimes also called "electro-electrets"), as well as the physics of musical instruments.

== Awards and honors ==
- Student fellowship of the Studienstiftung des Deutschen Volkes (1974–1979)
- ITG Award of the Informationstechnische Gesellschaft im VDE (1988)
- Silver medal as young scientist of the foundation Werner-von-Siemens-Ring (1989)
- Fellow of the Institute of Electrical and Electronics Engineers (IEEE) (1992)
- Technology-Transfer Award of the Technologie-Stiftung Brandenburg (2001)
- Fellow of the American Physical Society (APS) (2011)
- Whitehead Memorial Lecture of the IEEE Conference on Electrical Insulation and Dielectric Phenomena (CEIDP) (2014)
- Bernhard Gross Memorial Lecture, 16th International Symposium on Electrets (ISE), Leuven, Belgium, September 2017
- E. O. Forster Distinguished Service Award, IEEE Dielectrics and Electrical Insulation Society (2023)
