= Esther Largman =

Brazilian author (born 1934)

- Born: May 25, 1934
- Died: August 13, 2025 (aged 91)
- Occupations: writer, teacher, historian
- Writing career
- Period: 1992-2003
- Notable works: Jovens Polacas; Jan e Nassau:Trajetória de um Índio Cariri na Corte Holandesa; Tio Kuba nos Trópicos
- Notable awards: Lima Barreto award

Esther Regina Largman (May 25, 1934–August 13, 2025) was a Jewish-Brazilian teacher, historian, and author of fiction and nonfiction born in Salvador, in the state of Bahia. She graduated in 1955 from the National Faculty of Philosophy, Rio de Janeiro, with a BA and MA in history and geography. She also took classes in cultural anthropology at the Federal University of Rio de Janeiro in 1978. Her works have been recognized by the Brazilian government and are now a part of the high school curriculum in Brazilian schools.

She is the author of three Jewish-themed historical novels. A stage adaptation of her first novel, Jovens Polacas (translated alternately as Young Polacas or Polish Girls) was produced in 1998 at a São Paulo venue called Teatro Maria Della Costa. The novel was also made into a feature film in 2019. Based on the author's research on a real phenomenon, it is a fictionalized account of young Jewish women from Europe who were tricked by a Jewish criminal organization into working in prostitution in South America in the early 1900s. There they were called "Polacas", a pejorative term for lower-class European prostitutes who were assumed, often erroneously, to be Jewish.

Largman's third novel, Tio Kuba nos Trópicos [English: Uncle Kuba in the Tropics], won a Lima Barreto award. The novel tells the story of Jews who escaped the Austro-Hungarian empire in the 19th and 20th centuries and immigrated to Salvador, Brazil. It is a fictionalized account of her own family's story.

== Published works ==
=== Fiction ===
- Jovens Polacas [Young Polacas or Polish Girls] (1992)
- Jan e Nassau:Trajetória de um Índio Cariri na Corte Holandesa [Jan and Nassau: Trajectory of a Cariri Indian at the Dutch Court] (1996)
- Tio Kuba nos Trópicos [Uncle Kuba in the Tropics] (1999)
- O Milionésimo Café de Augusta e Da Janela [Augusta’s Millionth Coffee and From the Window] (2003)
- An excerpt of Polish Girls (translated into English by Nelson H. Vieira) was included in Contemporary Jewish Writing in Brazil (2009)

=== Non-fiction ===
- Judeus nos Trópicos [Jews in the Tropics] (2003)
