= Swieca =

Świeca or Swieca may refer to:

- Świeca, Greater Poland Voivodeship, village in Poland
- Henry Swieca (born 1957), American billionaire
- Jorge A. Swieca (1936–1980), Brazilian physicist
