= Cornélio Penna =

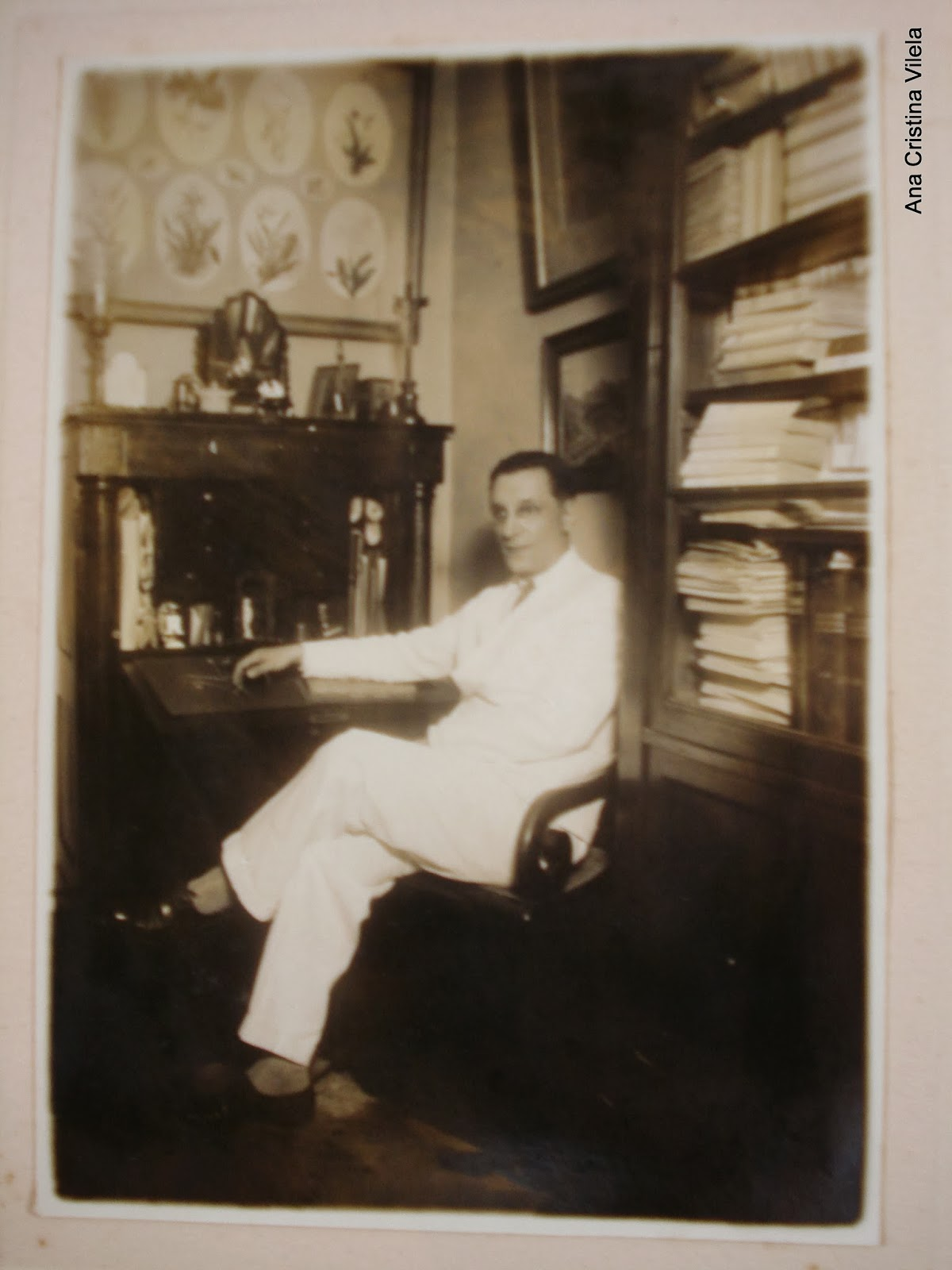
- Born: February 20, 1896; Petrópolis
- Died: February 12, 1958 (aged 61); Rio de Janeiro, Brazil
- Education: Faculdade de Direito do Largo de São Francisco
- Occupations: writer, painter, printmaker
- Writing career
- Period: 1935 - 1954
- Notable work: A Menina Morta
- Notable awards: Prêmio Carmem Dolores Barbosa

Cornélio de Oliveira Penna (February 20, 1896 – February 12, 1958) was a Brazilian novelist and plastic artist. He pioneered psychological realism in Brazilian literature.

== Biography ==
Born in Petrópolis into a middle-class family, he soon moved to Itabira, a small rural town. According to Carlos Drummond de Andrade, Cornélio ''was born, lived, and died interiorly in Itabira''. He would then complete his secondary education in Campinas and enroll at the Faculty of Law of São Paulo, from which he graduated.

Established in Rio de Janeiro, he began working as a professional artist, holding solo exhibitions of his canvases and drawing illustrations for newspapers. During this period he was associated with the traditionalist Centro Dom Vital. In the early 1930s, he abandoned his career as an artist to devote himself to writing.

His novels Fronteira and Dois Romances de Nico Horta drew the attention of many critics. Alceu Amoroso Lima compared his prose and introspective themes to those of French-American author Julien Green. Academic critics recognized Penna, together with Octavio de Faria and Lúcio Cardoso, as representatives of an ''intimist'' style of realism, as opposed to the predominant socially-oriented regionalism of the time.

He died in 1958, leaving behind an unfinished novel, Alma Branca, which was published posthmously in 2020. The house Faria e Silva published many of his drawings, sketches, and paintings in the volume Caderno de pinturas e desenhos.

== Works ==
- Fronteira (1935)
- Dois Romances de Nico Horta (1938)
- Repouso (1948)
- A Menina Morta (1954)
- Alma Branca e outros escritos (2020)
