= Gustavo Corção =

Brazilian writer (1896–1978)

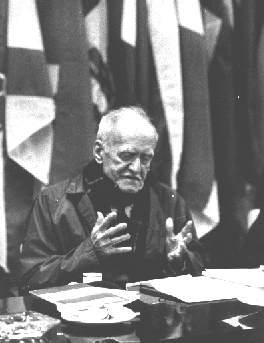
- Born: December 17, 1896; Rio de Janeiro, Brazil
- Died: July 6, 1978 (aged 81); Rio de Janeiro, Brazil
- Occupations: Novelist; writer; journalist; professor
- Writing career
- Notable works: Dois Amores, Duas Cidades; O Século do Nada

Gustavo Corção Braga (17 December 1896 – 6 July 1978) was a Brazilian Roman Catholic apologist, historian, novelist, electrical engineer, and journalist.

== Career overview ==
Corção was educated at the Polytechnic School of UFRJ, but left the institution in 1920 without obtaining his degree in engineering, specializing later in electronics. He was an active member of the Brazilian Communist Party (PCB) at this time. After meeting Alceu Amoroso Lima, however, he kept himself at a distance from communist groups and remained close to Catholic circles until his conversion, in 1939. Corção studied Thomism and theology with Benedictine monks and played an important role at Dom Vital Centre in Rio de Janeiro, founded by Jackson de Figueiredo. He participated in the "Catholic revival" movement in Brazil, which converted many intellectuals previously attracted to Positivism.

The writings of G. K. Chesterton had a strong effect on Corção. In 1946 he published an essay on Chesterton's ideas and even translated one of his books, The Barbarism of Berlin. He was also strongly influenced by the work of the French Catholic writer Jacques Maritain, while still close to the Action Française. His only novel, Lições de Abismo [Who if I Cry Out] (in Portuguese), was awarded by Unesco and later translated into many languages. Corção worked for decades as a journalist, collaborating to several prestigious newspapers, such as Tribuna da Imprensa, Diário de Notícias, Estado de S. Paulo and O Globo. In O Século do Nada (The Century of Nothing), he passionately defended the Francoist Spain and José Antonio Primo de Rivera. According to him, the Second Vatican Council was a "terminal sin". In August 1969, he founded Permanência, a split from Dom Vital Centre. The name of the magazine came from the French Permanences created by Jean Ousset, the founder of the Catholic City.

== Influence ==
Corção's influence among traditionalist Catholics persists to this day. In France, for instance, the Abbey of Sainte-Madeleine du Barroux has published two of his books, La Découverte de l'Autre and Le Siècle de l'Enfer. French historian Olivier Compagnon also notes the publication of some of Corção's work in Jean Madiran's newspaper, Routes.

His work has been highly regarded by Antonio Olinto, Ariano Suassuna, Gilberto Freyre, Nelson Rodrigues and Manuel Bandeira.

== Trivia ==
- A street in Rio de Janeiro bears his name (Rua Gustavo Corção).

== Works ==
- Braga, Gustavo Corção (1944), A Descoberta do Outro [The Discovery of the Other] (in Portuguese), Agir [trans. into Spanish, Desclée: De Brouwer, 1950].
  - ——— (1957), My Neighbour as Myself, trans. by Clotilde Wilson, London: Longmans, Green & Co.
  - ——— (1987), La Découverte de l'Autre [The Discovery of the Other] (in French), préf. de Louis Pauwels; trad. par Hugues Kéraly, Le Barroux: Sainte-Madeleine.
- ——— (1946), Três Alqueires e Uma Vaca [Three Acres & a Cow] (in Portuguese), Agir [trans. into Spanish, Plantin, 1954].
- ——— (1946b), A Barbaria de Berlin [Berlin’s Barbarism] (in Portuguese), Agir.
- ——— (1950), Lições de Abismo [Lesson of Deep] (in Portuguese), Agir [trans. into Italian, Torino: SEI, 1960].
  - ——— (1967), Who if I Cry Out, trans. by Clotilde Wilson, University of Texas Press.
- ——— (1954), As Fronteiras da Técnica [The Limits of Technique] (in Portuguese), Agir [trans. into Spanish, Buenos Aires: Oikos, 1982].
- ——— (1956), Dez Anos: Crônicas [Ten Years: Chronicles] (in Portuguese), Agir.
- ——— (1958), Claro Escuro [Chiaroscuro] (in Portuguese), Agir.
- ——— (1959), Machado de Assis (in Portuguese), Agir.
- ——— (1960), Patriotismo e Nacionalismo [Patriotism & Nationalism] (in Portuguese), Presença.
- ——— (1965), O Desconcerto do Mundo [The World Disconcerted] (in Portuguese), Agir.
- ——— (1967), Dois Amores Duas Cidades [Two Loves Two Cities] (in Portuguese), Agir.
- ——— (1968), Comentário à Encíclica Populorum Progressio [Comments on the Populorum Progression Encyclical] (in Portuguese), Instituto de Pesquisas Sociais.
- ——— (1969), A Tempo e Contra-tempo [In Time and Counter Time] (in Portuguese), Permanência.
- ——— (1970), Progresso e Progressismo [Progress & Progressivism] (in Portuguese), Agir.
- ——— (1973), O Século do Nada [The Century of Nothingness] (in Portuguese), Record.
  - ——— (1994), Le Siècle de l'Enfer [The Century of Hell] (in French), préf. de Jean Madiran; trad. de Hugues Kéraly, Le Barroux: Sainte-Madeleine.
- ——— (1992), As Descontinuidades da Criação [The Discontinuities of Creation] (in Portuguese), Permanência.
- ——— (2010), Gustavo Corção – Melhores Crônicas [Gustavo Corção – Better Chronicles] (in Portuguese), Global.
