= Tatiana Roque =

Brazilian professor and mathematician

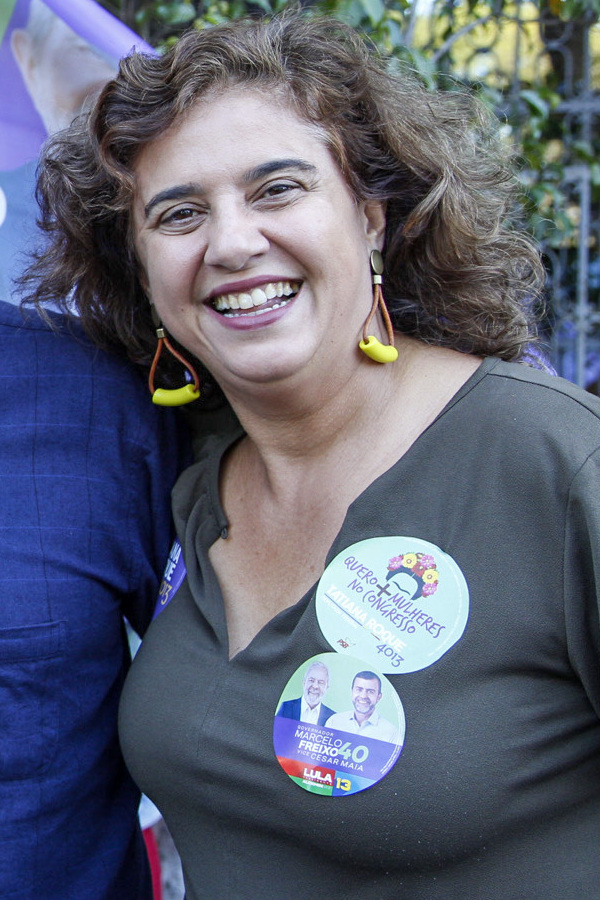
- Tatiana Roque in 2022
- Born: Tatiana Marins Roque; April 24, 1970 (age 56); Rio de Janeiro, Brazil
- Occupations: Mathematician; professor; politician
- Awards: Jabuti Award
- Website: tatianaroque.com.br

Tatiana Marins Roque (born April 24, 1970) is a Brazilian historian of mathematics and politician.

== Academic career ==
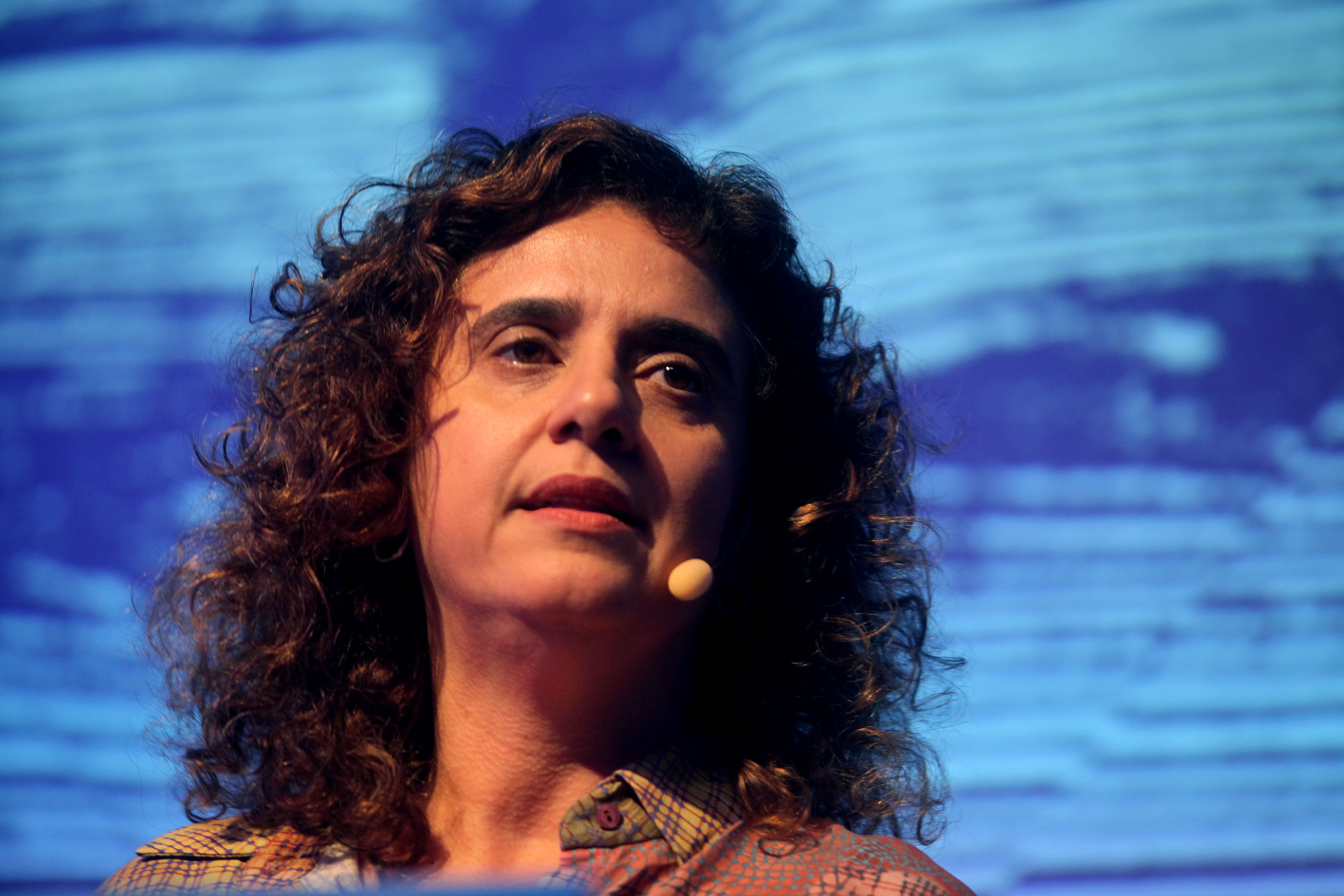
Tatiana Roque at the International Congress of Mathematicians in 2018

Roque is a professor at the Institute of Mathematics (IM) of the Federal University of Rio de Janeiro (UFRJ), with a Ph.D. in Production Engineering from the Alberto Luiz Coimbra Institute of Graduate Studies and Research in Engineering (Coppe), also at UFRJ. Her research area covers the historiography of mathematics, the relationship between history and mathematics education, and the history of differential equations and celestial mechanics theories at the turn of the 19th to the 20th century. Her book História da matemática: uma visão crítica, desfazendo mitos e lendas (2012) was one of the winners of the 2013 Jabuti Award.

She was a guest speaker at the 2018 International Congress of Mathematicians, which took place in Rio de Janeiro, and served as the coordinator of UFRJ's Forum of Science and Culture between 2019 and 2022.

== Political career ==
In the 2018 elections, Roque ran as a candidate for Federal Deputy for the Socialism and Liberty Party (PSOL) in Rio de Janeiro. She received 15,789 votes but was not elected. In the 2022 elections, she ran for the same position under the Brazilian Socialist Party (PSB). She received 30,764 votes but was not elected, becoming the first alternate to Eduardo Bandeira de Mello.

In February 2023, she assumed the position of Secretary of Science and Technology of the city of Rio de Janeiro, being appointed by Mayor Eduardo Paes.
