= Centro Dom Vital =

Lay Catholic cultural center

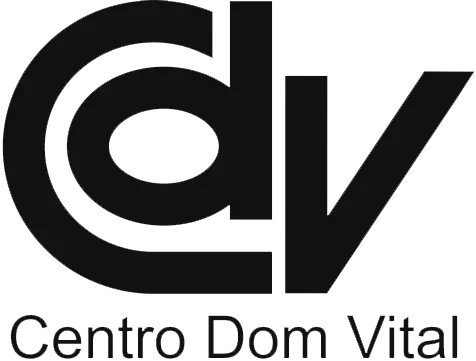
- Abbreviation: CDV
- Formation: May, 1922
- Founder: Jackson de Figueiredo
- Type: Private nonprofit organization
- Headquarters: Araújo Porto Alegre street, nº 60, Center
- Location: Rio de Janeiro, Brazil
- Secretary General: Renato Beneduzi
- Key people: Alceu Amoroso Lima
- Website: https://centrodomvital.com.br/

Centro Dom Vital (English: Dom Vital Center, CDV) is a historical lay Catholic cultural center based in Rio de Janeiro, Brazil.

Founded by the lawyer and journalist Jackson de Figueiredo, the Center brought together writers, artists, and philosophers, and advocated the Church's doctrine and social teaching.

Its primary objectives were to catechize and educate laypeople, as well as to form a conservative, anti-modernist intellectual elite. Its members were instrumental in the founding and consolidation of the Pontifical Catholic University of Rio de Janeiro.

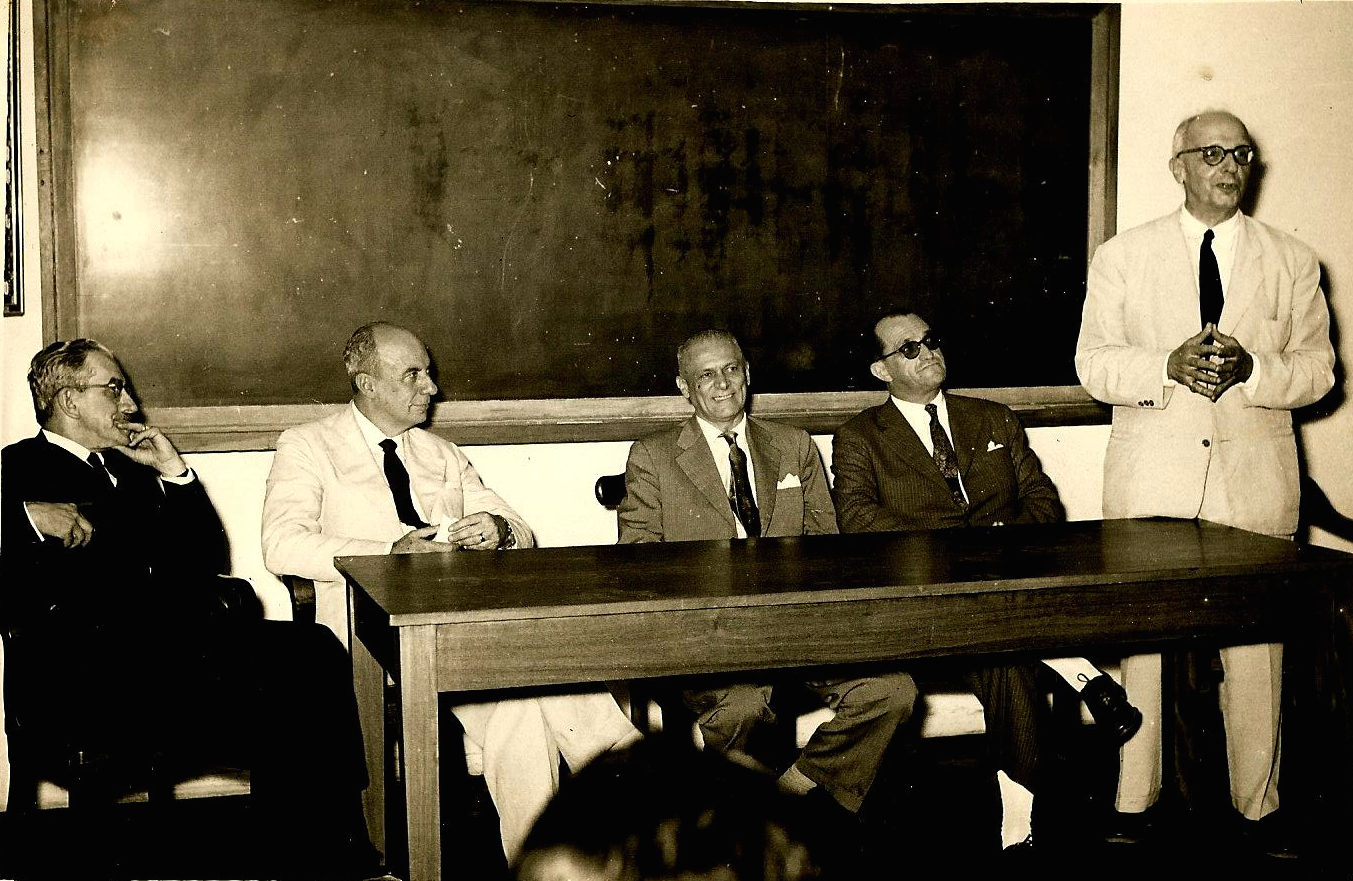
Meeting held by members. Alceu Amoroso Lima, who presided over the Center for many decades, is at the far right of the image.

It publishes the centenary journal A Ordem (pt) annually.

== History ==
The Center was started by a group of young men led by Jackson de Figueiredo, who had been directed and encouraged by Cardinal Dom Sebastião Leme. Among the group were politicians and journalists eager to intervene in intellectual and public debate. The year of the Center's formation, 1922, coincided with major historic developments in Brazil, such as the holding of the Modern Art Week, the foundation of the Brazilian Communist Party, and the Copacabana Fort revolt.

Taking a contrary stance toward what they perceived as threats to Tradition and Authority, the members sought to reunite the lay public and young intellectuals in hopes of forming a Catholic militancy and a vigorous group of intellectuals capable of defending the Church's doctrine.

== Notable members and associated people ==
- Jorge de Lima, poet
- Octavio de Faria, novelist
- Cornelio Penna, novelist and pioneer of psychological realism in Brazil
- Murilo Mendes, surrealist poet
- Ismael Nery, painter
- Sobral Pinto, lawyer and human rights activist
- Gustavo Corção, writer and Catholic apologist
- Vinicius de Moraes, poet, singer and a key-figure in Bossa Nova music
- Oswaldo Aranha, UN diplomat
- José Pedro Galvão de Sousa, philosopher
- Maurílio Penido, philosopher
- Guerreiro Ramos, sociologist
