= Sérgio Mascarenhas de Oliveira =

Brazilian physicist (1928–2021)

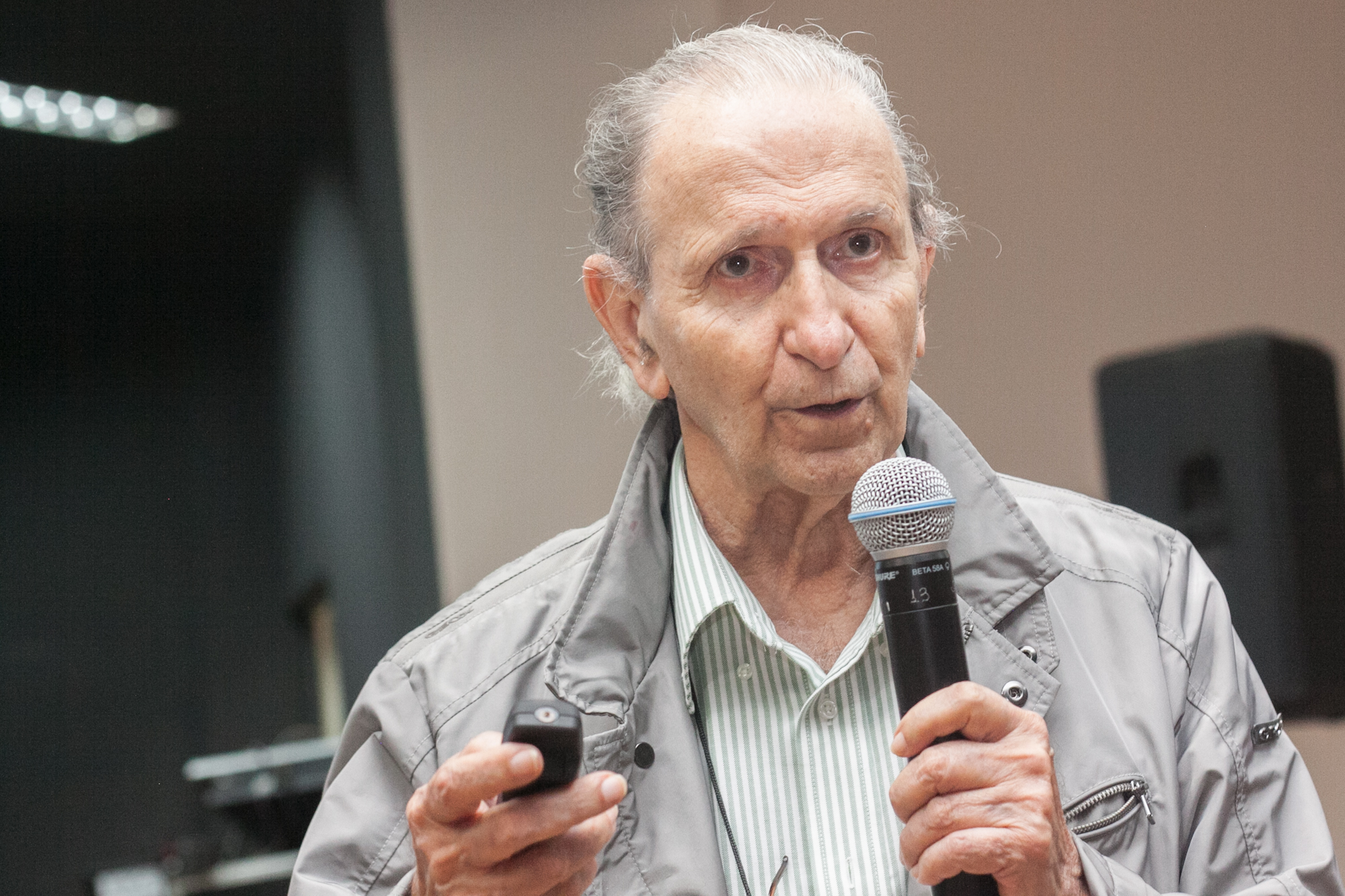
Sérgio Mascarenhas de Oliveira, a noted Brazilian experimental physicist, educator and scientific leader

Sérgio Mascarenhas de Oliveira (May 2, 1928 — May 31, 2021) was a Brazilian experimental physicist, educator and scientific leader. He was awarded several prizes including the Brazilian Order of Scientific Merit in the categories of Commander and Great Cross, the Conrado Wessel Prize for General Science, the Joaquim da Costa Ribeiro Prize and the Guggenheim Fellowship.

His main contributions to science were new observations of the thermo-dielectric effect; the discovery of bioelectrets, i.e. electrets as a property of biological materials such as bone and biopolymers, enabling the development of a new detector used in radiological dosimetry to date human bones in archeological sites; and the development of a non-invasive procedure to measure intracranial pressure.

Mascarenhas contributed to the creation of important Brazilian research institutions, such as the farming instrumentation center of the Brazilian Agricultural Research Corporation and the Federal University of São Carlos.

== Early life ==
Mascarenhas was born in Rio de Janeiro, and obtained his degree in chemistry in 1951 from Federal University of Rio de Janeiro and in Physics in 1952 from the Rio de Janeiro State University.

He was a visiting scholar in many universities around the world, including Carnegie Mellon, Princeton, Harvard, MIT and University of London.

== Federal University of São Carlos ==
Sérgio Mascarenhas played a major role in the establishment of the Federal University of São Carlos. Back in 1968, when the idea of creating the first federal university in São Paulo state came up, Mascarenhas proposed the creation of an innovative university instead of a traditional one (Mascarenhas had moved from Rio de Janeiro to São Carlos looking for more research opportunities in solid-state physics). The Federal University of São Carlos was then established with that vision in mind and Mascarenhas was appointed the university's first rector, where he helped to create the materials engineering degree, the first of its kind in Latin America.

He died in Ribeirão Preto.

== Bibliography ==
- MASCARENHAS, S. 1971. Bipole centers and optical absorption in CaF:Ce. Physical Review Letters., vol. 24, p. 98-100.
- MASCARENHAS, S. 1973. Electron spin resonance dosimetry of bones from the Hiroshima atomic bomb site. Bull. Am. Phys. Soc., vol. 18, p. 579.
- MASCARENHAS, S. 1974. The electret effect in bone and biopolymers and the bound water problem. Ann. N.Y. Acad. Sci., vol. 238, p. 36-52.
- MASCARENHAS, S. 1979. Bioelectrets: electrets in biomaterials and biopolymers. Electrets - Topics in Applied Physics., vol. 33, p. 341-346. Springer-Verlag
- MASCARENHAS, S. 1982. Electron spin resonance dating of human bones from Brazilian shell-mounds (Sambaquis). American Journal of Physical Anthropology., vol. 159, p. 413-417.
