= Maria Della Costa =

Brazilian actress (1926–2015)

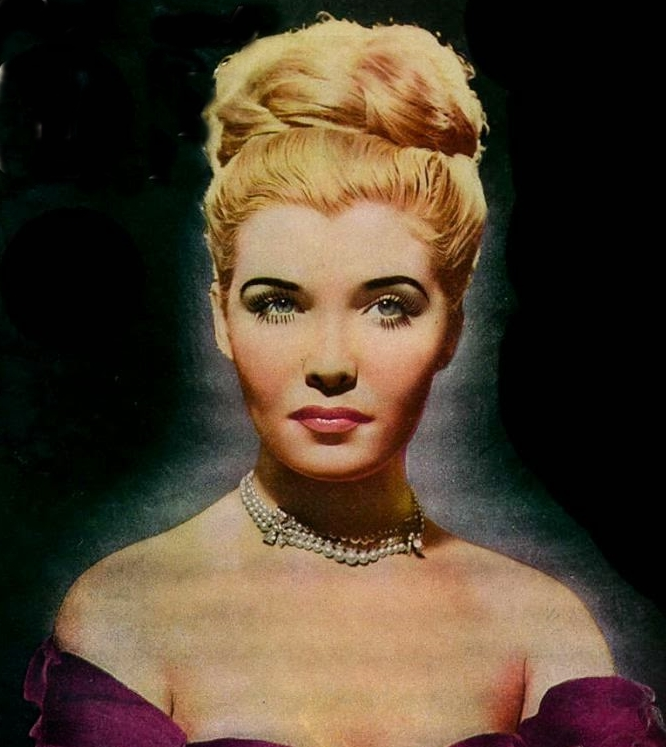
- Born: Gentile Maria Marchioro Della Costa; 1 January 1926; Rio Grande do Sul, Brazil
- Died: 24 January 2015 (aged 89); Rio de Janeiro, Brazil
- Occupation(s): Actress, Theater

Maria Della Costa (born Gentile Maria Marchioro Polloni, 1 January 1926 – 24 January 2015) was a Brazilian theater, movie and TV actress and producer.

== Life ==
She was born in Flores da Cunha, a small town in the state of Rio Grande do Sul, into a family of Italian immigrants from the region of Veneto. She was immortalized in paintings by Emiliano Di Cavalcanti, Flavio de Carvalho, Guanabarino, and Djanira, and in a statue by Victor Brecheret. She started her career at 14 years of age, as a fashion model (she is considered the first professional model in Brazil).

She was married to Sandro Polloni, a theater producer, also of Italian origin. Together they founded Teatro Maria Della Costa in São Paulo in a building designed by Oscar Niemeyer and Lúcio Costa.

After retiring from show business, she owned and managed a small hotel (Coxixo Hotel) in the historical and tourist town of Paraty, Rio de Janeiro. She died of a pulmonary edema on January 24, 2015.

== Filmography ==
=== Television ===
- 1990 - Brasileiras e Brasileiros
- 1982 - Sétimo Sentido .... Juliana
- 1978 - Te contei? .... Ana Paula
- 1976 - Estúpido Cupido .... Olga
- 1970 - As Bruxas .... Teresa
- 1969 - Beto Rockfeller .... Maitê

=== Theatre ===
- 1992 - Típico Romântico
- 1988 - Temos Que Refazer a Casa
- 1986 - Alice, Que Delícia
- 1982 - Motel Paradiso
- 1974 - Tome Conta de Amélia
- 1973 - Bodas de Sangue
- 1968 - Tudo no Jardim
- 1968 - Abra a Janela e Deixa Entrar o Ar Puro e o Sol da Manhã
- 1967 - Homens de Papel
- 1964 - Depois da Queda
- 1963 - Pindura Saia
- 1962 - Armadilha Para um Homem Só
- 1962 - O Marido Vai à Caça
- 1960 - Society em Baby Doll
- 1959 - Gimba
- 1958 - A Alma Boa de Set-Suan
- 1956 - Moral em Concordata
- 1956 - A Rosa Tatuada
- 1956 - A Casa de Bernarda Alba
- 1955 - A Mirandolina
- 1955 - Com a Pulga Atrás da Orelha
- 1954 - O Canto da Cotovia
- 1952 - Manequim
- 1951 - Ralé
