= Leonel Franca =

Brazilian Catholic priest and teacher (1893–1948)

The Reverend Leonel Franca SJ
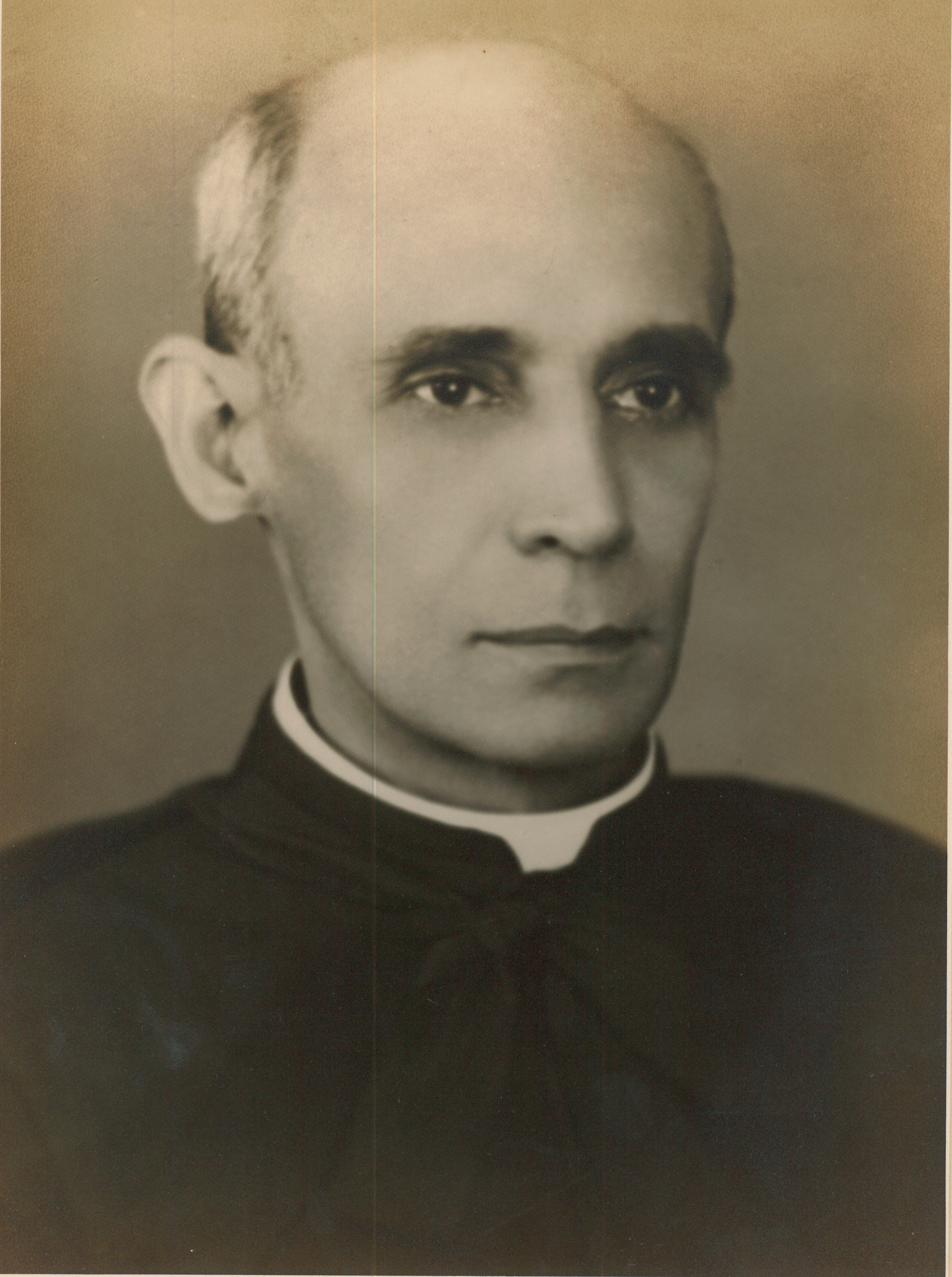

Personal details
- Born: Leonel Edgard da Silveira Franca; January 6, 1893 São Gabriel, Rio Grande do Sul, Brazil
- Died: September 3, 1948 (aged 55) Rio de Janeiro, Brazil
- Occupation: Catholic priest; teacher; writer

Leonel Edgard da Silveira Franca (January 6, 1893 – September 3, 1948), better known as Leonel Franca, was a Brazilian Catholic priest, writer and teacher. He received the Machado de Assis Prize from the Brazilian Academy of Letters in 1947, as a tribute to his body of work.

== Biography ==
Born into a family from Bahia, he was born in São Gabriel, in Rio Grande do Sul, when his father, a railway engineer, was working on the construction of a railway. He had eight siblings.

The family returned to Bahia and Leonel Franca initially studied in Salvador, at the Jesuit Colégio Vieira, and at the age of 13 he was transferred to the Colégio Anchieta. At the age of 14 he had the first heart attack of the disease that accompanied him throughout his life.

He joined the Society of Jesus in 1908 and in 1910 he began the literature course, typical of the Jesuit formation. In 1912 he went to Rome to study Philosophy at the Pontifical Gregorian University.

Back in Brazil in 1915, he began teaching at Colégio Santo Inácio (Rio de Janeiro). Franca taught history of philosophy, experimental psychology and chemistry at Colégio Anchieta.

In 1920 he returned to Rome to study theology for four years, being ordained a priest in 1923. The following year Franca received his doctorate in philosophy and theology and in November 1925 he completed, in O|ia, Spain, the last year of his Jesuit formation, the so-called "Third Probation".

He returned to Rio de Janeiro in 1927, and began working at the Centro Dom Vital as an Ecclesiastical Assistant for this institution, for the Catholic University Action and for the Association of Catholic Teachers.

Father Franca was very close to Cardinal Dom Sebastião Leme, Archbishop of Rio de Janeiro and one of the main Catholic leaders of the first half of the 20th century in Brazil. Together they dedicated themselves to defending the ideas of the Catholic Church in the area of education. Franca maintained a constant production of articles published in newspapers and magazines. Catholic leaders considered the existence of a Catholic University in Brazil to be essential, and a first move in this direction was the creation of the Catholic Institute of Higher Education, founded in 1932 at the Centro Dom Vital.

In the 1930s, he became closer to Plínio Salgado's Integralism, and was responsible for approving the Integralist Guidelines for publication. The Guidelines are an essential document of the Integralist Doctrine, considered the second most important of the Brazilian Integralist Action (AIB), after the October Manifesto.

He was a member of the National Education Council in 1931 and vice-rector of the Colégio Santo Inácio (Rio de Janeiro). Franca played a prominent role in the founding of the Pontifical Catholic University of Rio de Janeiro and was also its first rector.

In 1947 he received the Machado de Assis Prize.

In addition to his solid intellectual, philosophical and theological training, he gained fame for his refutations of Brazilian Protestant pastors and leaders, as well as for the controversies he maintained with them, having written several books to explain and substantiate his positions, such as "The Church, the Reformation and Civilization", "Catholicism and Protestantism" and "Protestantism in Brazil", which can be found in second-hand bookstores and specialized bookstores.

Always suffering from fragile health, he died on September 3, 1948, leaving behind a bibliography with a strong Catholic apologetic connotation and several articles in newspapers of the time.

There is a street named after him in Campinas.

== Works ==
- Notions of History of Philosophy (1918; 2nd ed. 1921; 3rd ed. 1928; 7th ed. 1940)
- Notes on General Chemistry (1919)
- The Church, the Reformation and Civilization (1922)
- The Divorce (1931; 6th ed. 1946; 8th ed. 1951)
- The Psychology of Faith (1934)
- Protestantism in Brazil (1938)
- The Crisis of the Modern World (1941)
- Spiritual Thoughts (1949)
- The Jesuit Pedagogical Method (The Ratio Studiorum) (1952)
- Freedom and Determinism (1954)
- The Formation of Personality (1954)
- The Problem of God
- Relations between Church and State
- Catholicism and Protestantism
- The Book of Psalms
