= Lima Vaz =

Brazilian philosopher and Catholic priest (1921–2002)

Henrique Cláudio da Lima Vaz
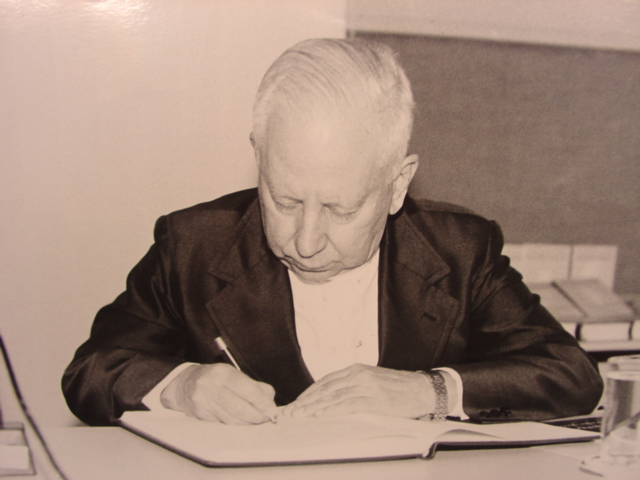
- In the study room of the Jesuit School of Philosophy and Theology
- Born: 24 August 1921; Ouro Preto, Minas Gerais, Brazil
- Died: 23 May 2002 (aged 80); Belo Horizonte, Minas Gerais, Brazil
- Occupations: Professor, educator
- Awards: Ordem do Mérito Cultural

Academic background
- Education: Pontifical Gregorian University
- Thesis: De dialectica et Contemplatione in Platonis Dialogis (1953)
- Influences: Plato, Aristotle, Augustine, Thomas Aquinas, René Descartes, Immanuel Kant, Georg Wilhelm Friedrich Hegel, Karl Marx, Henri de Lubac, Joseph Maréchal, Emmanuel Mounier

Academic work
- Main interests: Metaphysics, ontology, ethics, anthropology, history of philosophy
- Notable works: Escritos de Filosofia (I - VII)

Henrique Cláudio de Lima Vaz SJ (24 August 1921 – 23 May 2002) was a Brazilian Roman Catholic priest, philosopher, and professor. He is considered one of Brazil's foremost specialists on the philosophy of G. W. F. Hegel.

== Biography ==
=== Early years ===
Born in Ouro Preto into a family with intellectual traditions, Lima Vaz joined the Society of Jesus in 1938, studying at the old scholasticate of Nova Friburgo. In 1945, he moved to Rome to study theology and philosophy at the Pontifical Gregorian University, from which he graduated with a dissertation on Aristotle and Aquinas.

He was ordained a priest in 1948, and then completed his religious formation in Spain. In 1953, he earned a doctorate with a thesis on Plato's dialogues.

=== Teaching ===
Following his return to Brazil, Lima Vaz initiated his career as a professor at the Jesuit School of Philosophy and Theology, now located in Belo Horizonte. He taught at the Federal University of Minas Gerais, whose post-graduate programme he coordinated, and became a professor emeritus.

=== Activism ===
A fierce opponent of the military dictatorship, Lima Vaz was a mentor and guide to students involved with the left-wing movements Juventude Universitária Católica (pt) and Ação Popular (pt).

== Works ==
- Ontologia e História, São Paulo: Duas Cidades, 1968.
- Escritos de Filosofia I: Problemas de Fronteira, São Paulo: Loyola, 1986.
- Escritos de Filosofia II: Ética e Cultura, São Paulo: Loyola, 1988.
- Escritos de Filosofia III: Filosofia e Cultura, São Paulo, 1997.
- Escritos de Filosofia IV: Introdução à Ética Filosófica I, São Paulo: Loyola, 1999.
- Escritos de Filosofia V: Introdução à Ética Filosófica II, São Paulo: Loyola, 2000.
- Escritos de Filosofia VI: Ontologia e História (2a. edição), São Paulo: Loyola, 2001.
- Escritos de Filosofia VII: Raízes da Modernidade, São Paulo: Loyola, 2002.
- Antropologia Filosófica I, São Paulo: Loyola, 1991.
- Antropologia Filosófica II, São Paulo: Loyola, 1992.
- Experiência Mística e Filosófica da Tradição Ocidental, São Paulo: Loyola, 2000.
- Etica e Direito, São Paulo: Loyola, 2002.
- Contemplação e Dialética nos Diálogos Platônicos, São Paulo: Edições Loyola, 2012.
- A Formação do Pensamento de Hegel, São Paulo: Edições Loyola, 2014.
- Filosofia da natureza e filosofia do mundo. Edition G. A. Assumpção; organized by J. A. A. A. Mac Dowell. São Paulo: Edições Loyola, 2022.
