= Joaquim da Costa Ribeiro =

Brazilian physicist and professor (1906–1960)

- Born: July 8, 1906
- Died: July 29, 1960 (aged 54)
- Citizenship: Brazil
- Education: Universidade Federal do Rio de Janeiro
- Known for: Discovering the thermodielectric effect
- Awards: Carneiro Felippe Medal; Einstein Prize (ABC)

Joaquim da Costa Ribeiro (Rio de Janeiro, July 8th 1906 - July 29th, 1960) was a Brazilian physicist and university professor in Brazil. He discovered the thermodielectric effect, also known as the Workman-Reynolds in the US. Ribeiro was a member of the Brazilian Academy of Sciences and was the first Scientific Director of CNPq.

He is the father of anthropologist Yvonne Maggie and grandfather of movie author Ana Costa Ribeiro, who directed "Termodielétrico", a memoir film about him and his legacy.

== Biography ==
Costa Ribeiro was born at his family's house, on Barão de Itapejipe street, 82, in what was then the federal district of Brazil. His parents were Antonio Marques da Costa Ribeiro and Maria Constança Alburquerque da Costa Ribeiro. His father and grandfather, after whom Joaquim was named, were judges.

Costa Ribeiro studied in a Jesuit school called Santo Inácio, until 1923, enrolling in the National School of Engineering the next year at the University of Brazil.

Ten years later, he got tenure at the same university. In 1940, Costa Ribeiro started researching new methods to measure radioactivity, and later studied the production of electret using several dielectric materials

Costa Ribeiro observed that, during electret formation, electric current was unnecessary: the dielectric's natural freezing was enough to electrify the end material, provided that one of the cooling phases was solid.

The phenomenon was named "thermodielectric effect" by Costa Ribeiro and fully described by him in a 1944 article in the Annals of the Brazilian Academy of Sciences (ABC) that gathered significant attention at home and abroad. This marked the first physical phenomenon completely observed and described by a Brazilian researcher.

Two years later, he got a permanent position in general and experimental Physics at the National Philosophy College, at the same university.

=== Naming Controversy ===
In may 1950, six years after the complete description of the phenomenon, two american scientists, Everly J. Workman and Steve E. Reynolds, published an article on Physical Review describing the observation of the thermodielectric effect in ice and water, without acknowledging Costa Ribeiro's findings.

Despite attempts by the Brazilian scientific community to warn authors of the precedence, several papers still mention the thermodielectric effect as the "Workman-Reynolds effect".

== Death ==
Costa Ribeiro died on July 29, 1960 at 54 years of age, at the Casa de Saúde Santa Lúcia. He was survived by his nine children.

== Awards ==
Costa RIbeiro received the Einstein Prize by the ABC. He was also the first Brazilian delegate of UN for the peaceful use of nuclear energy.

Costa Ribeiro also helped to found CNPq, and was its first director. Since he was a pioneer of condensed matter physics in Brazil, the Brazilian Physical Society created the Joaquim da Costa Ribeiro prize, awarded to "researchers with meaningful contributions to condensed matter science in Brazil".
