= Teatro Maria Della Costa =

Theater in São Paulo, Brazil

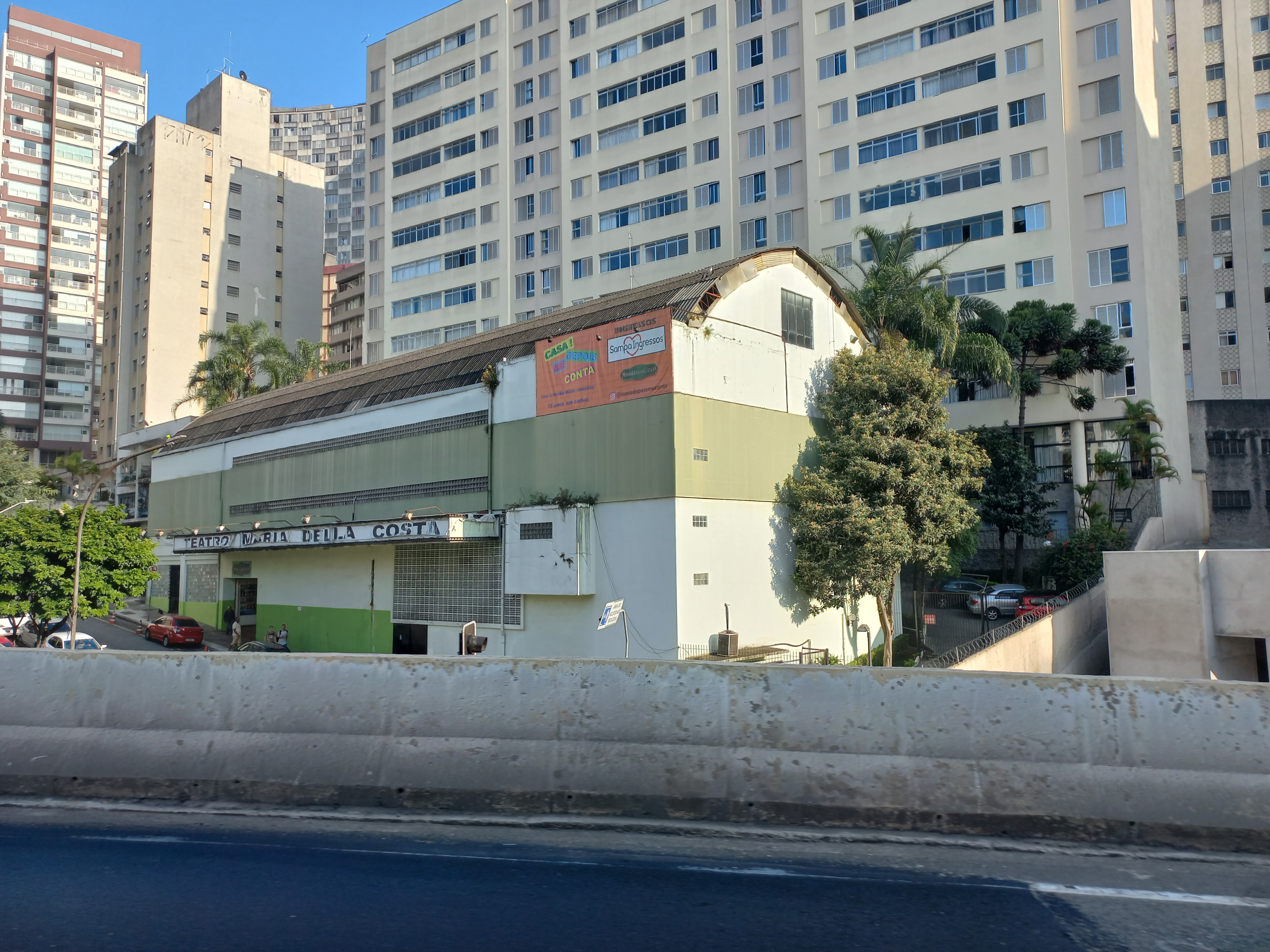
- Maria della Costa Theater
- Interactive map of the Teatro Maria Della Costa area

General information
- Location: R. Paim, 72; Bela Vista, São Paulo, Brazil
- Coordinates: 23.5547°S 46.6493°W
- Named for: Maria Della Costa
- Opened: 1954; 72 years ago
- Renovated: July 30, 1996

Design and construction
- Architects: Oscar Niemeyer; Lúcio Costa

Website
- Official website

Teatro Maria Della Costa is a theatre in São Paulo, Brazil. The theatre has a capacity of 370 seats.

== History ==
The theatre was founded in 1954 by actress Maria Della Costa and her husband, producer Sandro Polloni with the help of actress Italia Fausta Polloni.

The building was designed by Oscar Niemeyer and Lúcio Costa and financed with the help of Banco Nacional and Octávio Frias, owner of Folha de S.Paulo.

The first show at the theatre was Song of the Lark by Jean Anouilh directed by Gianni Ratto.

In 1978, the theatre was acquired by the Association of Theatrical Producers of São Paulo State, with the aim of providing more benefits to its members. In 1995, the theatre underwent a massive renovation, reopening on July 30, 1996 with a large reopening reception.

== Reviews ==
In 2014, the Folha de S.Paulo reviewed the sixty largest theatres in the city. The theatre received a three-star review, with reviewers writing that the venue is well-designed and the audience has a good view of the stage. The reviewers also mentioned that while the theatre has a large entrance hall, wheelchair users do not have access to the entrance hall or the lower boxes, instead entering from a street entrance that leads to the concert hall on the second floor.
