= Electret =

Object with trapped electrical charge

An electret (formed as a portmanteau of electr- from "electricity" and -et from "magnet") is a dielectric material that has a quasi-permanent electrical polarisation. An electret has internal and external electric fields, and is the electrostatic equivalent of a permanent magnet.

The term electret was coined by Oliver Heaviside for a (typically dielectric) material which has electrical charges of opposite sign at its extremities. Some materials with electret properties were already known to science and had been studied since the early 1700s. One example is the electrophorus, a device consisting of a slab with electret properties and a separate metal plate. The electrophorus was originally invented by Johan Carl Wilcke in Sweden in 1762 and improved by Alessandro Volta in Italy in 1775. The first documented case of production was by Mototarô Eguchi in 1925 who melted a suitable dielectric material such as a polymer or wax that contained polar molecules, and then allowed it to solidify in a powerful electric field. The polar molecules of the dielectric align themselves to the direction of the electric field, producing a dipole electret with a quasi-permanent polarization. Modern electrets are sometimes made by embedding excess charges into a highly insulating dielectric, e.g. using an electron beam, corona discharge, injection from an electron gun, electric breakdown across a gap, or a dielectric barrier.

== Electret types ==
There are two types of electrets:

- Real-charge electrets which contain excess free charges such as electrons or electron holes of one or both polarities which can move around, either
  - on the dielectric's surfaces (a surface charge)
  - within the dielectric's volume (a space charge)
  - Space charge electrets with internal bipolar charges known as ferroelectrets.
- Oriented-dipole electrets contain oriented (aligned) dipoles. These contain bound charges at their surface, which are not free to move around. These are similar to ferroelectric materials, and are always in materials which have no inversion symmetry so would also display piezoelectricity.

== Similarity to magnets ==
Electrets, like magnets, are dipoles. Another similarity is the fields: they produce an electrostatic field (as opposed to a magnetic field) outside the material. When a magnet and an electret are near one another, the Lorentz force acts on them: while stationary, neither has any effect on one another. However, when an electret is moved with respect to a magnetic pole, a force is felt which acts perpendicular to the magnetic field, pushing the electret along a path 90 degrees to the expected direction of "push" as would be felt with another magnet.

== Similarity to capacitors ==
There is a similarity between an electret and the dielectric layer used in capacitors; the difference is that dielectrics in capacitors have an induced polarisation that is mostly only transient, dependent on the potential applied on the dielectric, while dielectrics with electret properties exhibit quasi-permanent charge storage or polarisation. Some materials also display ferroelectricity (i.e. they react to the external fields with a hysteresis of the polarisation). Ferroelectrics can retain the polarisation permanently because they are in thermodynamic equilibrium, and thus are used in ferroelectric capacitors. Although electrets are only in a metastable state, those fashioned from very low leakage materials can retain excess charge or polarisation for many years. An electret microphone is a type of condenser microphone that eliminates the need for a polarisation voltage from the power supply by using a permanently charged material.

== Materials ==
Electret materials are quite common in nature. Quartz and other forms of silicon dioxide, for example, are naturally occurring electrets. Today, most electrets are made from synthetic polymers, e.g. fluoropolymers, polypropylene, polyethyleneterephthalate (PET), etc. Real-charge electrets contain either positive or negative excess charges or both, while oriented-dipole electrets contain oriented dipoles. The quasi-permanent internal or external electric fields created by electrets can be exploited in various applications.

== Manufacture ==
Bulk electrets can be prepared by heating or melting the material, then cooling it in the presence of a strong electric field. The electric field repositions the charge carriers or aligns the dipoles within the material. When the material cools, solidification "freezes" the dipoles in position. Materials used for electrets are usually waxes, polymers or resins. One of the earliest recipes consists of 45% carnauba wax, 45% white rosin, and 10% white beeswax, melted, mixed together, and left to cool in a static electric field of several kilovolts/cm. The thermo-dielectric effect, related to this process, was first described by Brazilian researcher Joaquim Costa Ribeiro.

Electrets can also be manufactured by embedding excess negative charge within a dielectric using a particle accelerator, or by stranding charges on, or near, the surface using high voltage corona discharges, a process called corona charging. Excess charge within an electret decays exponentially. The decay constant is a function of the material's relative dielectric constant and its bulk resistivity. Materials with extremely high resistivity, such as PTFE, may retain excess charge for many hundreds of years. Most commercially produced electrets are based on fluoropolymers (e.g. amorphous Teflon) machined to thin films.

== See also ==
- Oliver Heaviside
- Corona wire
- Telephone
- Electret microphone
- Electromotive force
- Ferroelectricity
