= Alceu Amoroso Lima =

Brazilian professor, philosopher and activist (1893–1983)

- Lima in 1935
- Born: December 11, 1893; Petrópolis, Brazil
- Died: August 14, 1983 (aged 89); Rio de Janeiro, Brazil
- Occupations: Writer, journalist, activist, professor
- Writing career
- Language: Portuguese
- Movement: Modernism in Brazil

Alceu Amoroso Lima (December 11, 1893 – August 14, 1983), also known under the pen name Tristão de Athayde, was a Brazilian essayist, literary critic, journalist, professor, philosopher, and Catholic activist.

In 1928, Lima, who had previously been an atheist, converted to Catholicism and later became head of Catholic Action in Brazil. Although initially sympathetic to integralism, he came to oppose both authoritarianism and fascism, growing into an exponent of Christian democracy in his country. He was a vocal critic of the Brazilian military dictatorship.

== Biography ==
=== Early years ===
Born into a middle-class family in Petrópolis, Lima grew up in the traditional neighborhood of Laranjeiras, in Rio de Janeiro. He was educated by the private tutor João Köpke, who taught him to read and write, and also received piano lessons from Alberto Nepomuceno. Between 1900 and 1909, he traveled through Europe with his family, and upon returning, enrolled at Colégio Pedro II, where he was reported as an ''atheist and Jacobin''. In 1913, he graduated from the National Faculty of Law with a degree in Law and Social Sciences.

=== Youth ===
In the year of his graduation, Lima travelled to Paris, where he attended lectures by Henri Bergson at the Collège de France. As the First World War broke out, he returned to Brazil, where he was appointed to a post at the Itamaraty, but soon left it to assume the management of his family's textile factory.

In 1919, he began working as a literary critic for O Jornal, at a time when he became increasingly close to Catholicism, influenced by his readings of Chesterton and Maritain, as well as by his friendship with the lawyer Jackson de Figueiredo. He converted in 1928, under the supervision of Father Leonel Franca.

=== Maturity ===
Following Jackson de Figueiredo's premature death in 1928, Lima assumed the presidency of Dom Vital Center, then a hub for conservative and anti-modernist intellectuals. His involvement in Catholic activism deepened as he became secretary of the Catholic Electoral League, a political activism group, and culminated with his leadership of the Catholic Action in Brazil. Lima founded the Universidade Santa Úrsula, located in Rio.

Alongside Eduardo Frei Montalva, he was among the founders of the Christian Democrat Organization of America. He represented Brazil at the Second Vatican Council. From 1967 to 1972 he was a member of the Pontifical Council for Justice and Peace.

=== Death ===
He died on August 14, 1983, aged 89.

== Career ==
=== Teaching ===
Lima had a long career as a professor, teaching Brazilian literature at the National Faculty of Philosophy and at the Pontifical Catholic University of Rio de Janeiro, which he helped found. He also gave lectures on Brazilian culture at the Sorbonne and at the University of New York.

== Works ==
- Estudos — Segunda série (1927)
- Política (1932)
- Idade, sexo e tempo (1938)
- Elementos de ação católica (1938)
- Mitos de nosso tempo (1943)
- O problema do trabalho (1946)
- Meditações sobre o mundo interior (1953)
- O existencialismo e outros mitos de nosso tempo (1951)
- O gigantismo econômico (1962)
- O humanismo ameaçado (1965)
- Meio Século de Presença Literária (1969)
- Violência ou não (1969)
- Comentários à Populorum Progressio (1969)
- Evolução Intelectual do Brasil (1971)
- Companheiros de Viagem (1972)
- Os direitos do homem e o homem sem direitos (1975)
- Revolução Suicida (1977)
- Tudo é mistério (1983)
