= José Pedro Galvão de Sousa =

Brazilian philosopher

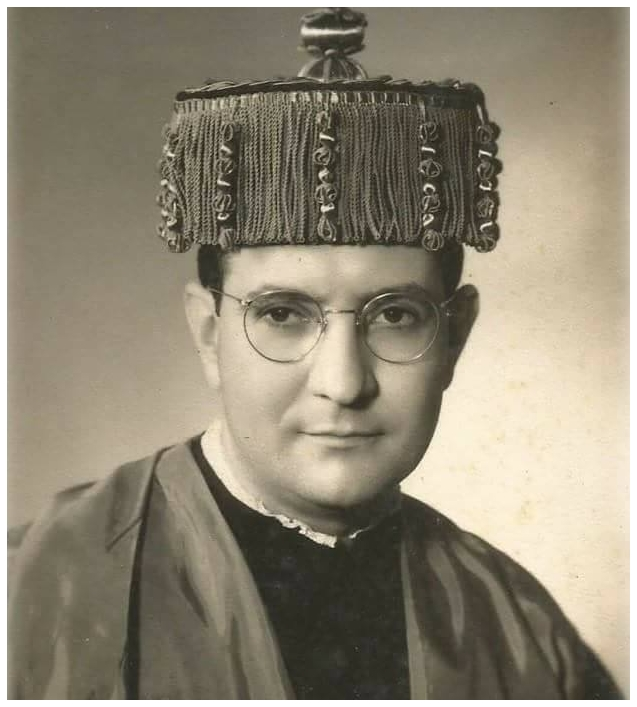
- Born: January 6, 1912; São Paulo, São Paulo (state), Brazil
- Died: May 31, 1992 (aged 80)
- Education: Faculty of Law of São Paulo
- Occupations: Writer, professor, translator
- Employers: University of São Paulo; Pontifical Catholic University of Campinas

José Pedro Galvão de Sousa (January 6, 1912 – May 31, 1992) was a Brazilian philosopher, jurist, political theorist, and professor.

He founded the Faculty of Law of the Pontifical Catholic University of São Paulo, served as the University's vice-rector, and was director of the Cásper Líbero College.

An exponent of natural law and an interpreter of the Church's social doctrine, he participated in the Catholic cultural movement that blossomed in early-to-mid 20th-century Brazil, collaborating with many journals and helping found the Acção Universitária Católica.

== Works ==
- O positivismo Jurídico e o Direito Natural (1940)
- Conceito e Natureza da Sociedade Política (1949)
- Formação Brasileira e Comunidade Lusíada (1954)
- Introdução à História do Direito Político Brasileiro (1954)
- Política e Teoria do Estado (1957)
- As Minorias Revolucionárias (1958) Totalitarismo nas Origens da Moderna Teoria do Estado
- Perspectivas Históricas e Sociológicas do Direito Brasileiro (1961)
- O Brasil no Mundo Hispânico (1962)
- Socialismo e Corporativismo em Face da Encíclica Mater et Magistra (1963)
- Raízes Históricas da Crise Política Brasileira (1965)
- Capitalismo, Socialismo e Comunismo (1965)
- Remarques su l'idée de constitution et la signification sociologique du droit constitutionnel, in french (1967)
- A Historicidade do Direito e a Elaboração Legislativa (1970)
- Da Representação Política (1971)
- A Constituição e os Valores da Nacionalidade (1971)
- O Totalitarismo nas Origens da Moderna Teoria do Estado (1972)
- O Estado Tecnocrático (1973)
- Iniciação à Teoria do Estado (1976)
- Direito Natural, Direito Positivo e Estado de Direito (1977)
- O Pensamento Político de São Tomás de Aquino (1980)
- Para Conhecer e Viver as Verdades da Fé (1982)
- Dicionário de Política (1998), with Clóvis Lema Garcia and José Fraga Teixeira de Carvalho

=== Translations ===
- ''A Nova Ciência da Política", by Eric Voegelin
