= Maurílio Teixeira-Leite Penido =

Brazilian Catholic priest and writer

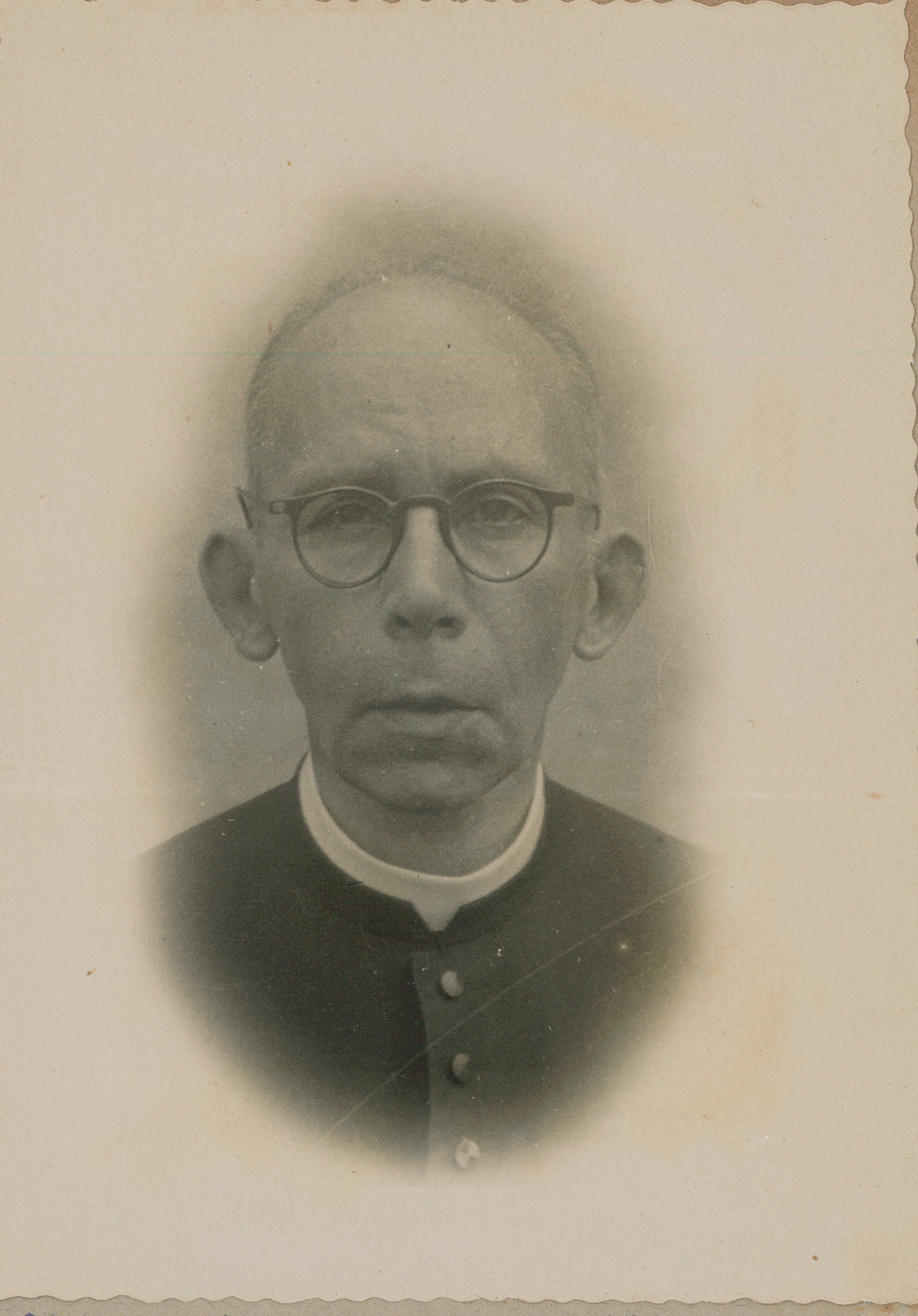
Maurílio Penido

Maurílio Teixeira-Leite Penido (Petrópolis, November 2, 1895 - Rio de Janeiro, June 23, 1970) was a Brazilian Roman Catholic priest, writer, philosopher, and professor.

== Biography ==
Born in Petrópolis into a wealthy family, Penido moved to Paris together with his widowed mother at age eleven. He studied literature and philosophy at the University of Paris, where he was a pupil of Henri Bergson, then went to Rome to further his education at the Pontifical Gregorian University, before completing his formation at the University of Fribourg, where he later became a professor. He taught at the National Faculty of Philosophy, a former unit of the Federal University of Rio de Janeiro.

His writings have been noted by René Guénon, Yves Congar, Régis Jolivet, Jacques Maritain, and Charles Journet.

== Works ==
- A Função da Analogia na Teologia Dogmática. Editora Vozes Limitada. Petrópolis, R.J. 1946
- Iniciação Teológica - vol 1: O Mistério da Igreja. 1954.
- Iniciação Teológica - vol 2: O Mistério dos Sacramentos.
- Iniciação Teológica - vol 3: O Mistério de Cristo.
- Deus no Bergsonismo. 1993.
- Le methode de Bergson. 1993.
- Newman. 1994.
- O Itinerário Místico de São João da Cruz. Rio de Janeiro: Diadorim. 1995.
