= Sebastião da Silveira Cintra =

20th-century Catholic cardinal and archbishop

His Eminence Sebastião Leme da Silveira Cintra
- Archbishop of São Sebastião do Rio de Janeiro
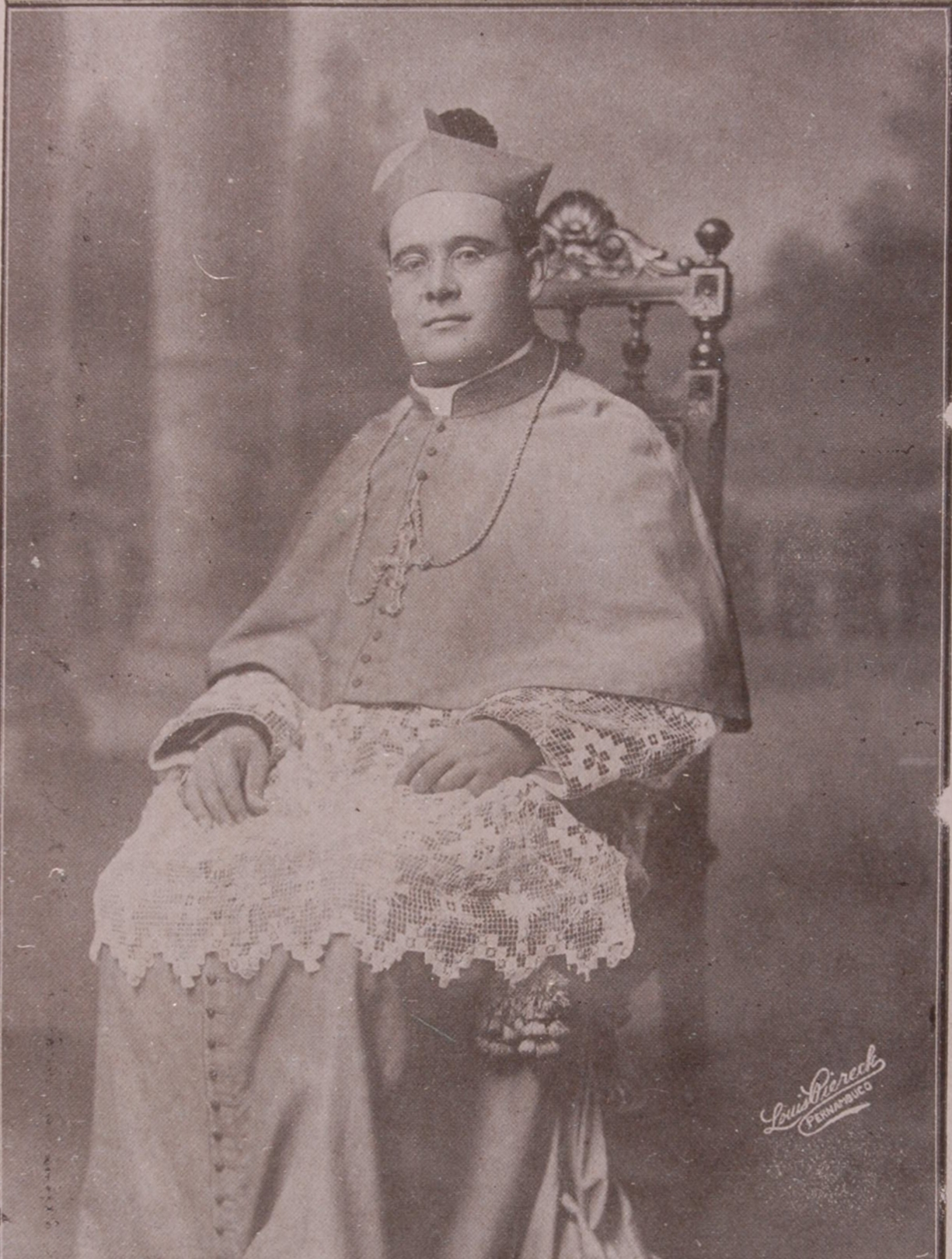
- Leme, c. 1920
- Church: Roman Catholic Church
- Archdiocese: Archdiocese of São Sebastião do Rio de Janeiro
- In office: 3 July 1930 - 17 October 1942
- Predecessor: Joaquim Arcoverde de Albuquerque Cavalcanti
- Successor: Jaime de Barros Câmara
- Previous posts: Auxiliary Bishop of São Sebastião do Rio de Janeiro (1911-1916); Titular Bishop of Orthosias (1911-1916); Archbishop of Olinda (1916-1921); Coadjutor Archbishop of Rio de Janeiro (1921-1930)

Orders
- Ordination: 28 October 1904
- Created cardinal: 3 July 1930 by Pope Pius XI
- Rank: Cardinal-Priest

Personal details
- Born: January 20, 1882 Espírito Santo do Pinhal, Empire of Brazil
- Died: October 17, 1942 (aged 60) Rio de Janeiro, Brazil
- Denomination: Roman Catholic
- Education: Pontifical Gregorian University
- Motto: Cor Unum In Anima Una (English: One Heart in one Soul)
- Coat of arms

Styles of Sebastião da Silveira Cintra
- Reference style: His Eminence
- Spoken style: Your Eminence
- Informal style: Cardinal
- See: São Sebastião do Rio de Janeiro

Sebastião Leme da Silveira Cintra (January 20, 1882 – October 17, 1942) was a Brazilian Cardinal of the Roman Catholic Church. He served as Archbishop of São Sebastião do Rio de Janeiro from 1930 until his death, and was elevated to the cardinalate in 1930.

== Biography ==
=== Early life and ministry ===
Born in Espírito Santo do Pinhal, Sebastião da Silveira Cintra studied at the seminary in São Paulo and the Pontifical Gregorian University in Rome before being ordained to the priesthood on October 28, 1904. He then did pastoral work in the Archdiocese of São Paulo, including serving as a seminary professor and the director of the archdiocesan newspaper A Gazeta do Povo. He was a cathedral canon from 1904 to 1910, and Pro-Vicar General of São Paulo from 1909 to 1911.

=== Bishop ===
On March 24, 1911, Cintra was appointed Auxiliary Bishop of São Sebastião do Rio de Janeiro and Titular Bishop of Orthosias in Phoenicia by Pope Pius X. He received his episcopal consecration on the following June 24 from Joaquim Arcoverde de Albuquerque Cavalcanti, with Archbishop Francisco do Rego Maia and Bishop Juan Terrero y Escalada serving as co-consecrators, in Rome. Cintra was later named Archbishop of Olinda on April 29, 1916; he also assumed leadership of the archdiocese of Recife when it was united with Olinda two years later in 1918. On March 15, 1921, he became Coadjutor Archbishop of São Sebastião do Rio de Janeiro and Titular Archbishop of Pharsalus. The appointment of a Coadjutor Archbishop of Rio de Janeiro had been rendered necessary by the failing health of the local Ordinary, Cardinal Arcoverde, Brazil's first Cardinal. As Coadjutor, Cintra, who had been consecrated to the Episcopate by Arcoverde and who had served as his auxiliary Bishop, now aided Arcoverde in the government of the See of Rio de Janeiro. Cintra also consecrated Carlos Duarte Costa (later excommunicated and Patriarch of ICAB) as Bishop of Botucatu on December 8, 1924.

In the early 1920s, Cintra, then deeply involved in Rio's cultural life, played a major role in the foundation of Centro Dom Vital, counseling and encouraging the young convert Jackson de Figueiredo.

=== Cardinal ===
Cintra eventually succeeded Cardinal Arcoverde as Archbishop of São Sebastião do Rio de Janeiro upon the latter's death on April 18, 1930. Pope Pius XI created him Cardinal Priest of Santi Alessio e Bonifacio in the consistory of July 3 of that same year.

Also in 1930, in November, he intervened in the revolution through which Getúlio Vargas assumed power: The Cardinal was credited with saving the life of the incumbent president, Washington Luís. The revolutionary forces surrounded Guanabara Palace and were set to invade it, but the Cardinal succeeded in gaining admission to the Palace to negotiate the withdrawal of the deposed President, thus avoiding bloodshed. Before entering the President's office in Guanabara Palace, he said to the cabinet: "Time does not permit vacillation. The exaltation and animation of the people is great and I urge the President to retire to a fort or barracks. I have been insisting on this for nine hours and now it is almost too late". Cintra then successfully persuaded Luís to resign after a half-hour-long conversation.

Among the many events to which he served as papal legate was the dedication of Christ the Redeemer on September 14, 1931. Cintra was one of the cardinal electors who participated in the conclave of 1939, which elected Pope Pius XII. In 1941, he founded the Catholic University of Rio de Janeiro, that later was granted the title of "Pontifical Catholic University".

=== Death ===
On October 17, 1942, Cardinal Cintra died from a heart attack at age 60 in Rio de Janeiro and is buried at the Shrine of the Eucharistic Heart of Jesus, located in the city.

Catholic Church titles
| Preceded by Luís da Silva Brito | Archbishop of Olinda; 1916–1921 | Succeeded by Miguel de Lima Valverde |
| Preceded by Joaquim Arcoverde de Albuquerque Cavalcanti | Archbishop of São Sebastião do Rio de Janeiro; 1930–1942 | Succeeded by Jaime de Barros Câmara |
