= Ferroelectret =

A ferroelectret, also known as a piezoelectret, is a thin film of polymer foams, exhibiting piezoelectric and pyroelectric properties after electric charging. Ferroelectret foams usually consist of a cellular polymer structure filled with air. Polymer-air composites are elastically soft due to their high air content as well as due to the size and shape of the polymer walls. Their elastically soft composite structure is one essential key for the working principle of ferroelectrets, besides the permanent trapping of electric charges inside the polymer voids. The elastic properties allow large deformations of the electrically charged voids. However, the composite structure can also possibly limit the stability and consequently the range of applications.

== How it works ==
The most common effect related to ferroelectrets is the direct and inverse piezoelectricity, but in these materials, the effect occurs in a way different from the respective effect in ferroelectric polymers. In ferroelectric polymers, a stress in the 3-direction mainly decreases the distance between the molecular chains, due to the relatively weak van de Waals and electrostatic interactions between chains in comparison to the strong covalent bonds within the chain. The thickness decrease thus results in an increase of the dipole density and thus in an increase of the charges on the electrodes, yielding a negative d33 coefficient from dipole-density (or secondary) piezoelectricity. In cellular polymers (ferroelectrets), stress in the 3-direction also decreases the thickness of the sample. The thickness decrease occurs dominantly across the voids, the macroscopic dipole moments decrease, and so do the electrode charges, yielding a positive d33 (intrinsic or direct (quasi-)piezoelectricity).

== New features ==
In recent years, alternatives to the cellular-foam ferroelectrets were developed. In the new polymer systems, the required cavities are formed by means of e.g. stamps, templates, laser cutting, etc. Thermo-forming of layer systems from electret films led to thermally more stable ferroelectrets.
