= Jorge A. Swieca =

Jorge André Swieca was a Brazilian physicist born in Warsaw, Poland in 1936. He was mostly active in quantum field theory (QFT), particularly during the 1960s and 1970s. A series of summer schools is named after him.

Swieca fled Poland with his parent during World War II, shortly after it was occupied by Russia and Germany. They spent two years in Japan, before moving to Rio de Janeiro, Brazil. He obtained his PhD from the University of São Paulo under Werner Güttinger in 1964. He died in December 1980, after complications from a heart bypass surgery. In the late 1960s, he received the Brazilian Santista science prize.

== Important publications ==
- R. Haag; J.A. Swieca (1965). "When does a quantum field theory describe particles?" (PDF). Communications in Mathematical Physics. 1 (4): 308. Bibcode:1965CMaPh...1..308H. doi:10.1007/BF01645906. S2CID 120204056.
