= Guerreiro Ramos =

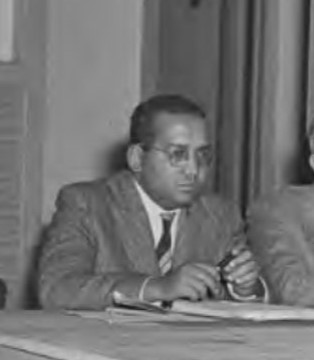
- Born: September 13, 1915; Santo Amaro da Purificação, Bahia, Brazil
- Died: April 6, 1982 (aged 66); Los Angeles
- Education: Faculdade Nacional de Psicologia
- Occupations: Sociologist, politician
- Spouse: Clélia Guerreiro Ramos

Alberto Guerreiro Ramos (13 September 1915—6 April 1982) was a Brazilian sociologist and politician. An influent Afro-Brazilian thinker, he was instrumental on the development of a native sociological framework, criticizing the use of European paradigms for studying the Brazilian society, especially race relations and the condition of the Black people in Brazil. He advocated for appropriating those concepts to the national reality (what he called sociological reduction). He was also a leading figure in organization theory

In 1956, Pitirim Sorokin, analyzing the situation of sociology in the second half of the 20th century, included Guerreiro Ramos among the authors who most contributed to the progress of the discipline.

== Intellectual career ==
Guerreiro Ramos was born in Santo Amaro da Purificação, in the state of Bahia, son of a conductor and a washerwoman. At age 16, after his father death, he moved to Salvador, the state capital. There, he worked at the newspaper O Imparcial, wrote poetry (collected in the book O Drama de ser Dois) and participated in the youth wing of the Brazilian Integralist Action.

In 1942 he graduated in science from the former Faculdade Nacional de Psicologia, in Rio de Janeiro, in what was then the Federal District, graduating a year later from the Faculty of Law, in the same city. He was a visiting professor at the Federal University of Santa Catarina, professor at the Brazilian School of Public Administration (EBAP) at Fundação Getúlio Vargas and at courses in sociology and economic and social problems in Brazil promoted by the Public Service Administrative Department (DASP). In 1944 he was one of the founders of the Teatro Experimental do Negro, with Abdias do Nascimento.

He gave lectures in Beijing, Belgrade, and at the Academy of Sciences of the Soviet Union. In 1955, he was a visiting lecturer at the University of Paris. In 1972 and 1973 he was visiting fellow at Yale University and visiting professor at Wesleyan University.

When he was expelled from the country by the military dictatorship, he was invited to teach at the University of Southern California (USC) from 1966 onwards, settling in the United States. In 1980, back in Brazil without breaking his ties with the USC, he teaches at the Federal University of Santa Catarina (UFSC), where he organizes a master's degree in Governmental Planning, based on his theory of the delimitation of social systems. Upon returning to the United States in April 1982, he received the Phi Kappa Phi award; he died of cancer a week after, on 6 April.

== Political career ==
Guerreiro Ramos was advisor to President Getúlio Vargas during his second government. He then served as director of the sociology department at the Instituto Superior de Estudos Brasileiros (ISEB). He entered party politics in 1960, when he joined the Brazilian Labor Party (PTB), to whose national directory he belonged. In the October 1962 election, he ran for federal deputy for the State of Guanabara, on the side of the Socialist Labor Alliance, formed by the PTB and the Brazilian Socialist Party (PSB), obtaining only the second substitute. He held a seat in the Chamber of Deputies from August 1963 to April 1964, when his political rights were revoked by Institutional Act No. 1.

He also defended a state monopoly of oil, nationalization of the pharmaceutical industry and of bank deposits. To promote agrarian reform, he defended payment of expropriations in public debt bonds. He also defended electoral (voting for the illiterate and for soldiers and eligibility of all voters), banking and administrative reforms.

He was also Secretary of the Executive Group for Support to Small and Medium Industries of the BNDES, advisor to the Secretary of Education of Bahia, administrative technician of the Administrative Department of Public Service (DASP) and the National Children's Department. He also served as Brazil's delegate to the United Nations.

In 2010, in his honor, the Federal Administration Council instituted the "Guerreiro Ramos Public Management Award", whose purpose is the dissemination and appreciation of the studies and actions of public managers.

== Published works ==
- 1949 — Introdução ao histórico da organização racional do trabalho. Rio de Janeiro: Editora Departamento Administrativo do Serviço Público (DASP) - Republicado em 2009 pelo Conselho Federal de Administração.
- 1950 — Sociologia do Orçamento Familiar. Rio de Janeiro: Editora Departamento de Imprensa Nacional.
- 1952 — A Sociologia Industrial. Formação, Tendências Atuais. Rio de Janeiro: Editora Cândido Mendes.
- 1955 — Sociología de la Mortalidad Infantil (Biblioteca de Ensayos Sociologicos). México: Instituto de Investigaciones de la Universidad Nacional.
- 1957 — Introdução Crítica à Sociologia Brasileira. Rio de Janeiro: Editorial Andes Ltda.
- 1958 — A Redução Sociológica - Introdução ao Estudo da Razão Sociológica. Rio de Janeiro: Editoral MEC/ISEB. - Reeditado em 1965 e 1996.
- 1960 — O Problema Nacional do Brasil. Rio de Janeiro: Editorial Saga.
- 1961 — A Crise do Poder no Brasil (Problemas da Revolução Nacional Brasileira). Rio de Janeiro: Editora Zahar.
- 1963 — Mito e verdade da revolução brasileira. Rio de Janeiro: Zahar.
- 1966 — Administração e Estratégia do Desenvolvimento - Elementos de uma Sociologia Especial da Administração. Rio de Janeiro: Editora da Fundação Getúlio Vargas.
- 1981 — A nova ciência das organizações: uma reconceituação da riqueza das nações. Rio de Janeiro: Editora da Fundação Getúlio Vargas - Republished in 1989
  - English version: The New Sciences Organizations: A Reconceptualization of the Wealth of Nations. University of Toronto Press, 1981. ISBN 978-1-4875-7459-8
- 1983 — Administração e Contexto Brasileiro - Esboço de uma Teoria Geral da Administração. Rio de Janeiro: Editora da Fundação Getúlio Vargas
- 1983 — Sociologia e a Teoria das Organizações - Um Estudo Supra Partidário. Santos: Editora Leopoldianum.
