= Institute of Mathematics, UFRJ =

Institute of Mathematics UFRJ
- Institute of Mathematics, UFRJ
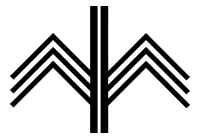
- Other names: IM-UFRJ
- Type: Public
- Established: 1964
- Parent institution: UFRJ
- Dean: Wladmir Neves
- Academic staff: 167 faculty members and researchers (2018–2019)
- Location: Rio de Janeiro, RJ, Brazil
- Website: im.ufrj.br
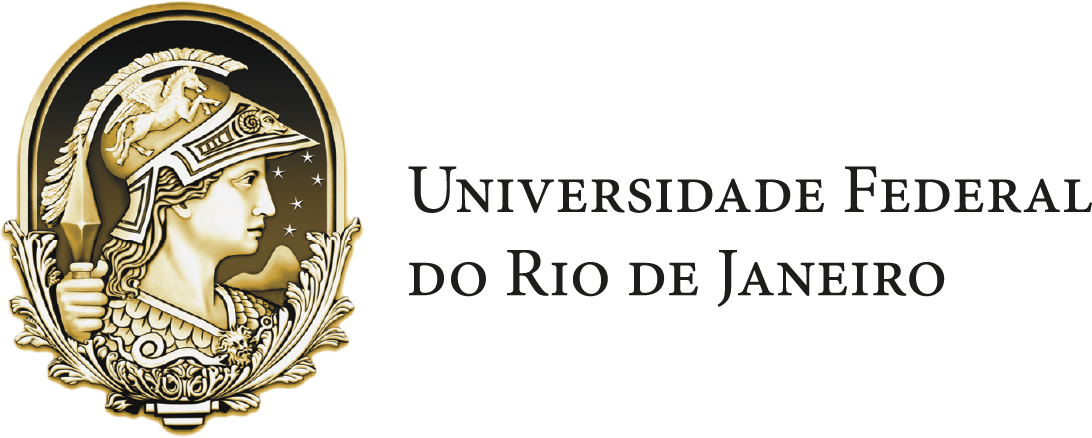

The Institute of Mathematics of the Federal University of Rio de Janeiro (IM-UFRJ) is a teaching, research and extension unit. A unit of the Center for Mathematical and Natural Sciences (CCMN), located at Campus do Fundão in Cidade Universitária, Rio de Janeiro.

== History ==
The Institute of Mathematics of UFRJ (IMFRJ) was created by Resolution No. 22, of the University Council of the University of Brazil, on March 19, 1964, and was maintained by Decree No. 60455-A of March 13, 1967, which approved the Restructuring Plan of UFRJ, former University of Brazil, had its origin in the Departments of Mathematics of the former National School of Engineering and the extinct National Faculty of Philosophy of the former University of Brazil; when the implementation of the so-called University Reform began. It was institutionalized as a unit of the Center for Mathematical Sciences and Nature (CCMN), by Decree No. 66,536, dated May 6, 1970, which approved the Statute of UFRJ.

== Departments and research areas ==
The smallest fraction of the structure of the university is the department. Your responsibility is to plan, execute and coordinate research and teaching in your area of expertise. He is responsible for the didactic orientation of the subjects.

=== Departments ===
- Department of Mathematics
- Department of Computer Science
- Department of Statistical Methods
- Department of Applied Mathematics

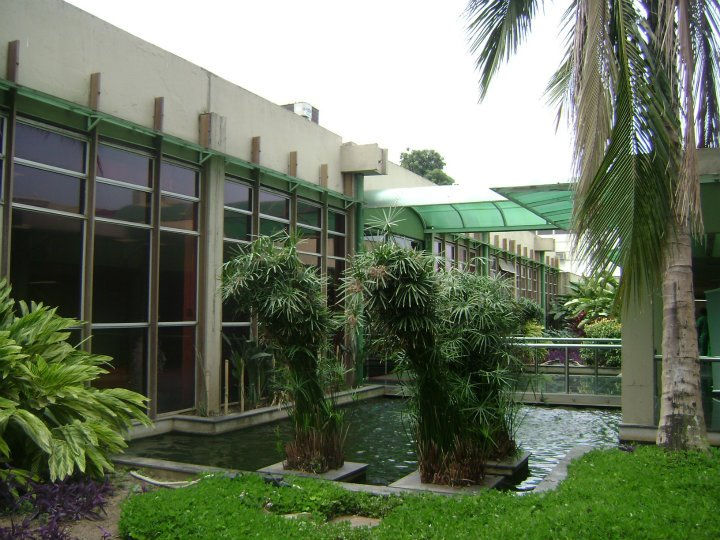
The garden at Institute of Mathematics, UFRJ

=== Research areas ===
- Numerical analysis
- Arithmetic of bodies and functions
- Complexity and fundamentals of computational mathematics
- Analysis and partial differential equations
- Mathematical physics
- Differential geometry
- Ring theory and group theory
- System dynamics
- Geometric theory of foliations
- Algebraic topology
- Probability
- Statistics
- Econometrics and actuarial
- Probability and processes
- Teaching and history of mathematics
- Management and analysis of complex systems
- Adaptive complex systems
