= Jackson de Figueiredo =

Brazilian lawyer, intellectual and journalist (1891–1928)

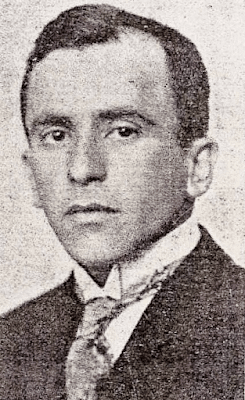
- Born: 9 October 1891; Aracaju, Sergipe, Brazil
- Died: 4 November 1928 (aged 37); Rio de Janeiro, Rio de Janeiro, Brazil
- Occupations: Lawyer, intellectual and journalist

Jackson de Figueiredo Martins (9 October 1891 – 4 November 1928) was a Brazilian lawyer, intellectual, and journalist, best known as the founder of Dom Vital Center.

== Life ==
Jackson de Figueiredo, born on (9 October 1891), was a very well-known intellectual and journalist in Brazil. In 1909, Figueiredo began his academic studies in a faculty of law in Salvador, where he establish residence. In 1913, he concluded the course and the following year went to live in Rio de Janeiro. Motivated by the 1916 pastoral letter by Bishop of Olinda Sebastiao da Silveira Cintra, he converted to Catholicism in 1918. His conversion created a sensation and was the reference point of the Brazilian Catholic laity. It was also the decisive impetus for the formation of a conservative political Catholicism in Brazil. With this intention, and encouraged by Bishop Leme da Silveira, in 1922 he founded the Centro Dom Vital, named after the late Bishop of Olinda Vital Gonçalves Maria de Oliveira, and in 1921 the magazine A Ordem (The Order). With these two, he opposed Communism and Liberalism of his time.

He died in Rio de Janeiro, on 4 November 1928, aged 37, but his influence continued and eventually led to the founding in 1932 of the Electoral Catholic League as a Catholic representation for the Constituent Assembly, which President Getúlio Vargas summoned.

== Works ==
- 1913: Xavier Marques
- 1915: Rosa Garcia
- 1916: Algumas Reflexoes sobre a Filosofia de Farias Brito (Some Reflections on the Philosophy of Farias Brito)
- 1919: A Social Questão na Filosofia de Farias Brito (The Social Question in the philosophy of Farias Brito)
- 1921: Do nacionalismo na Hora Presente (over the current nationalism)
- 1921: Afirmações (assertions)
- 1921: A ReAction do Bom Senso (The reaction of common sense)
- 1922: Auta de Sousa
- 1924: Pascal ea Inquietação Moderna (Pascal and the current unrest)
- 1924: Literatura Reacionária (reactionaries literature)
- 1924: A Coluna de Fogo (The Pillar of Fire)
- 1925: Durval de Morais e os Poetas de Nossa Senhora (Durval de Morais and the Poets of Our Lady)
