= Diocese of São Luíz de Cáceres =

Catholic ecclesiastical territory

Diocese of São Luíz de Cáceres Dioecesis Sancti Aloisii de Caceres Diocese de São Luíz de Cáceres
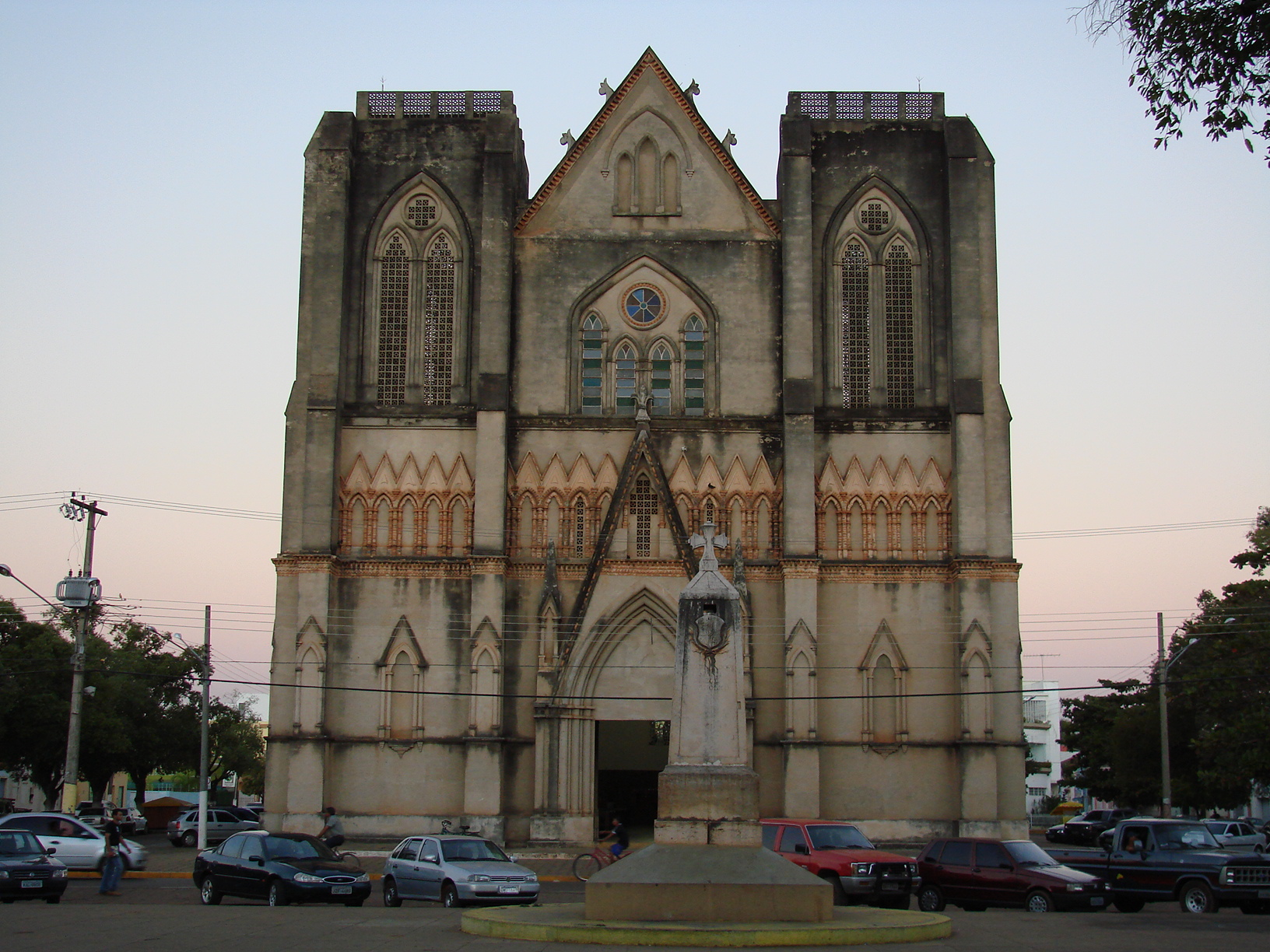
- Cathedral of St. Louis of France

Location
- Country: Brazil
- Ecclesiastical province: Cuiabá
- Metropolitan: Cuiabá

Statistics
- Area: 100,000 km^{2} (39,000 sq mi)
- Population: Total; Catholics: (as of 2010); 428,000; 334,000 (78%)

Information
- Rite: Latin Rite
- Established: 5 April 1910 (115 years ago)
- Cathedral: Cathedral of St Louis IX of France in Cáceres
- Patron saint: St Louis IX

Current leadership
- Pope: Leo XIV
- Bishop: Jacy Diniz Rocha
- Metropolitan Archbishop: Mário Antônio da Silva
- Bishops emeritus: José Vieira de Lima, TOR

Website
- Website of the Diocese

The Roman Catholic Diocese of São Luíz de Cáceres (Latin: Dioecesis Sancti Aloisii de Caceres) is a suffragan Latin diocese in the ecclesiastical province of the Metropolitan Cuiabá in Mato Grosso state, western central Brazil.

Its cathedral episcopal see is Catedral São Luiz de França, dedicated to Saint King Louis IX of France, in the city of Cáceres.

== History ==
- Established on April 5, 1910 as Diocese of São Luíz de Cáceres, without missionary stage, on territory split off from its Metropolitan, the Archdiocese of Cuiaba
- Lost territories twice : on 1925.05.01 to establish the Territorial Prelature of Porto Velho and on 1929.03.01 to establish the Territorial Prelature of Guajará-Mirim

== Statistics ==
As per 2014, it pastorally served 351,000 Catholics (78.2% of 449,000 total) on 135,969 km^{2} in 23 parishes with 42 priests (25 diocesan, 17 religious), 1 deacon, 75 lay religious (23 brothers, 52 sisters) and 16 seminarians.

== Bishops ==
(all Roman rite)

=== Episcopal ordinaries ===
Suffragan Bishops of São Luíz de Cáceres

- Modesto Augusto Vieira (born Brazil) (1911.05.12 – 1914.01.12), next Titular Bishop of Archelaïs (1914.01.12 – 1916.09.27) as Auxiliary Bishop of Mariana (Brazil) (1914.01.12 – death 1916.09.27)
- Pedro Luis Maria Galibert, Third Order Regular of St. Francis of Penance (T.O.R.) (born France) (1915.03.13 – retired 1954.04.27), emeritate as Titular Bishop of Platæa (1954.04.27 – death 1965.12.24)
  - Apostolic Administrator Father Máximo André Biennès, T.O.R. (born France) (1955 – 1967.11.03 see below), without previous prelature
- Máximo André Biennès, T.O.R. (see above 1967.11.03 – retired 1991.07.24), died 2007
  - Auxiliary Bishop: José Afonso Ribeiro, T.O.R. (born Brazil) (1979.01.29 – 1988.07.06), Titular Bishop of Bagis (1979.01.29 – 1988.07.06); later second Bishop-Prelate of Territorial Prelature of Borba (Brazil) (1988.07.06 – retired 2006.05.03), died 2009
- Paulo Antônio de Conto (born Brazil) (1991.07.24 – 1998.05.27), next Bishop of Criciúma (Brazil) (1998.05.27 – 2008.07.02), Bishop of Montenegro (Brazil) (2008.07.02 – ...), Apostolic Administrator of Archdiocese of Passo Fundo (Brazil) (2015.07.15 – 2015.12.02)
- José Vieira de Lima, T.O.R. (born Brazil) (1998.11.11 – retired 2008.07.23); previously Bishop of Marabá (Brazil) (1990.04.18 – 1998.11.11)
- Antônio Emidio Vilar, Salesians of Don Bosco (S.D.B.) (born Brazil) (2008.07.23 - 2016.09.28), next Bishop of São João da Boa Vista (Brazil) (2016.09.28 – ...)
- Jacy Diniz Rocha (2017.05.10 – ...), no previous prelature.

=== Auxiliary bishop ===
- José Afonso Ribeiro, T.O.R. (1979-1988), appointed Prelate of Borba, Amazonas

== See also ==
- List of Catholic dioceses in Brazil

== Sources and external links ==
- GCatholic.org, with Google photo - data for all sections
- Catholic Hierarchy
