= Diocese of Cruzeiro do Sul =

Catholic ecclesiastical territory

Diocese of Cruzeiro do Sul Dioecesis Crucis Australis

Catholic
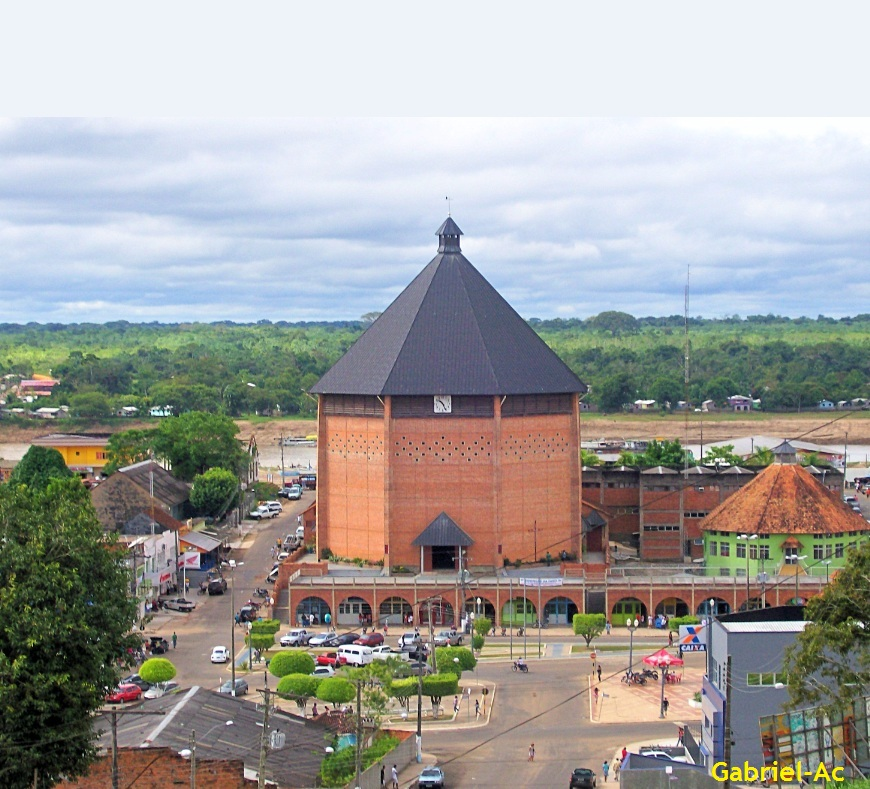
- Cathedral of Our Lady of Glory

Location
- Country: Brazil
- Ecclesiastical province: Porto Velho

Statistics
- Area: 126,633 km^{2} (48,893 sq mi)
- Population: Total; Catholics: (as of 2011); 261,000; 201,000 (77%)
- Parishes: 12

Information
- Denomination: Catholic Church
- Rite: Roman Rite
- Established: 22 May 1931 (95 years ago)
- Cathedral: Catedral Nossa Senhora da Glória

Current leadership
- Pope: Leo XIV
- Bishop: Flávio Giovenale, S.D.B.
- Metropolitan Archbishop: Roque Paloschi
- Bishops emeritus: Mosé João Pontelo, C.S.Sp.

Website
- www.diocesecruzeirodosul.org

The Roman Catholic Diocese of Cruzeiro do Sul (Latin: Dioecesis Crucis Australis) is a suffragan see in the ecclesiastical province of the Metropolitan Archdiocese of Porto Velho, Acre (state), westernmost Amazonian Brazil.

Its cathedral episcopal see is the Marian Catedral Nossa Senhora da Gloria, in the city of Cruzeiro do Sul, Acre.

== Statistics ==
As per 2014, it pastorally served 230,966 Catholics (80.6% of 286,462 total) on 126,633 km² in 12 parishes and 99 missions with 25 priests (16 diocesan, 9 religious), 91 lay religious (16 brothers, 75 sisters) and 13 seminarians.

== History ==
- On 22 May 1931, Pope Pius XI established the Territorial Prelature of Juruá, on canonical territory split off from the then Territorial Prelature of Tefé (later Apostolic Prefecture).
- Pope John Paul II elevated the prelature to Diocese of Cruzeiro do Sul on 25 June 1987.

== Bishops ==
=== Episcopal ordinaries ===
(Territorial) (Bishop-)Prelates of Juruá

- Heinrich Ritter (bishop), Holy Ghost Fathers (C.S.Sp.) (born Germany) (6 September 1935 - death 19 July 1942), Titular Bishop of Rhosus (1935.09.06 – 1942.07.19)
- Father Henrique Klein (1942 - death 1947)
- José Hascher, C.S.Sp. (born France) (22 March 1947 - retired 25 February 1967), Titular Bishop of Æliæ (1947.03.22 – death 1973.05.08)
- Heinrich Rüth, C.S.Sp. (7 February 1967 - 25 June 1987), Titular Bishop of Leptiminus (1966.06.21 – 1978.05.26), succeeding as former Coadjutor Bishop-Prelate of Territorial Prelature of Jurua (Brazil) (1966.06.21 – 1967.02.07)

Suffragan Bishops of Cruzeiro do Sul

- Heinrich Rüth, C.S.Sp. (25 June 1987 - retired 7 December 1988), died 2006
- Luís Herbst, C.S.Sp. (born Germany) (7 December 1988 - 3 January 2001), previously Coadjutor Bishop-Prelate of Territorial Prelature of Jurua (1979.08.07 – 1987.06.25), (see) promoted and restyled Coadjutor Bishop of Cruzeiro do Sul (1987.06.25 – 1988.12.07)
- Mosé João Pontelo, C.S.Sp. (3 January 2001 - 19 September 2018), succeeding as former Coadjutor Bishop of Cruzeiro do Sul (Brazil) (1998.05.27 – 2001.01.03).
- Flávio Giovenale, S.D.B. (19 September 2018 – present)

=== Coadjutor bishops ===
- Heinrich Rüth, C.S.Sp. (1966-1967), as Coadjutor Prelate
- Luís Herbst, C.S.Sp. (1979-1988), with 1979-1987 as Coadjutor Prelate
- Mosé João Pontelo, C.S.Sp. (1998-2001)

== See also ==
- List of Catholic dioceses in Brazil

== Sources and external links ==
- GCatholic - data for all sections
