= Mário Clemente Neto =

Brazilian Roman Catholic bishop (1940–2024)

His Excellency Mário Clemente Neto
- Prelate Emeritus of Tefé
- Archdiocese: Manaus
- Installed: 15 December 1982
- Term ended: 19 October 2000
- Predecessor: Joaquim de Lange
- Successor: Sérgio Eduardo Castriani

Orders
- Ordination: 14 August 1966 by Cristiano Portela de Araújo Pena
- Consecration: 19 October 1980 by Joaquim de Lange

Personal details
- Born: 7 August 1940 Itaúna, Minas Gerais, Brazil
- Died: 8 August 2024 (aged 84) Lagoa Santa, Minas Gerais, Brazil

Mário Clemente Neto (7 August 1940 – 8 August 2024) was a Brazilian Roman Catholic priest, prelate, and member of the Congregation of the Holy Spirit. Neto served as the Prelate of the Roman Catholic Territorial Prelature of Tefé, located in the Amazonian city of Tefé, from 15 December 1982 until his retirement on 19 October 2000.

Neto was born on 7 August 1940 in the rural community of Capão Escuro, located within Itaúna municipality, Minas Gerais. He entered the Congregation of the Holy Spirit on 2 February 1963 and was ordained as a Catholic priest on 14 August 1966 by Bishop Cristiano Portela de Araújo Pena of the Roman Catholic Diocese of Divinópolis. He then served as a priest and teacher in Minas Gerais and São Paulo.

Neto began working at a Holy Ghost Fathers parish in Tefé during the 1970s. The then-Prelate of Tefé Joaquim de Lange then appointed him to a position with the territorial prelature.

On 19 October 1980, Neto was appointed prelate coadjutor of the Roman Catholic Territorial Prelature of Tefé by Pope John Paul II. He was ordained as Prelate of Tefé in 1982 by his predecessor, Prelate Joaquim de Lange, and served until his retirement on 19 October 2000. During this time, he also held the position of vice president of the northern region of the Episcopal Conference of Brazil (CNBB).

Neto died at a nursing home in Lagoa Santa, Minas Gerais, on 8 August 2024, at the age of 84. His funeral was held at the Divino Espírito Santo Parish in Contagem with burial at the Central Cemetery of Itaúna.

Catholic Church titles
Preceded by Joaquim de Lange	Prelate of Tefé; 1982–2000	Succeeded by Sérgio Eduardo Castriani
