= Diocese of Santíssima Conceição do Araguaia =

Catholic ecclesiastical territory

Diocese of Santíssima Conceição do Araguaia Dioecesis Sanctissimae Conceptionis de Araguaia Diocese de Santíssima Conceição do Araguaia

Location
- Country: Brazil
- Ecclesiastical province: Belém do Pará
- Metropolitan: Belém do Pará

Statistics
- Area: 52,500 km^{2} (20,300 sq mi)
- Population: Total; Catholics: (as of 2010); 291,000; 225,000 (77.3%)

Information
- Rite: Latin Rite
- Established: 18 July 1911 (114 years ago)
- Cathedral: Cathedral of the Immaculate Conception in Conceição do Araguaia

Current leadership
- Pope: Leo XIV
- Bishop: Dominique Marie Jean Denis You
- Metropolitan Archbishop: Júlio Endi Akamine

Website
- Website of the Diocese

The Roman Catholic Diocese of (Santíssima) Conceição do Araguaia (Latin: Dioecesis Sanctissimae Conceptionis de Araguaia) is a Latin suffragan diocese of the Roman Catholic church, in the ecclesiastical province of the Metropolitan of Belém do Pará in Brazil.

Its cathedral see is Catedral Nossa Senhora da Conceição ('Our Lady of (Immaculate) Conception'), in the city of Conceição do Araguaia.

== History ==
- Established on July 18, 1911 as Territorial Prelature of (Santíssima) Conceição do Araguaia, on territory split off from the Roman Catholic Archdiocese of Belém do Pará (then and again its Metropolitan)
- Lost territory twice : to establish the Territorial Prelature of Xingu on 16 August 1934 and again to establish the Territorial Prelature of São Félix on 13 May 1969
- December 20, 1969: Suppressed, losing its territory to the Territorial Prelature of Marabá
- March 27, 1976: Restored as Territorial Prelature of Santíssima Conceição do Araguaia from the Territorial Prelature of Cristalândia and Territorial Prelature of Marabá
- October 16, 1979: Promoted as Diocese of Santíssima Conceição do Araguaia

== Ordinaries ==
(all Roman rite; mostly missionary members of Latin congregations)

Territorial (Bishop-)Prelates of Santíssima Conceição do Araguaia

- Bishop-prelate Raymond Dominique Carrerot, Dominicans (O.P.), Titular Bishop of Verinopolis (1912.08.26 – 1920.07.30); later Bishop of Porto Nacional (Brazil) (1920.07.30 – 1933.12.14)
- Sebastião Tomás, O.P., first as apostolic administrator (1920 – 1924.12.18),
- then as Bishop-Prelate (1924.12.18 – 1945.12.19), Titular Bishop of Platæa (1924.12.18 – 1945.12.19)
- Bishop Estêvão Cardoso de Avellar, O.P. (1976.03.27 – 1978.03.20)
- Bishop Luís António Palha Teixeira, O.P., first as Apostolic Administrator (1948.01.02 – 1951.02.20)
- then as Bishop-prelate (1951.02.20 – 1969.12.20), Titular Bishop of Lunda (1951.02.20 – 1981.08.21); later Bishop-Prelate of the then Marabá (Brazil) (1969.12.20 – 1976.11.10)
- prelature suppressed 1969-1976
- Bishop-prelate Patrício José Hanrahan, Redemptorists (C.Ss.R.) (1979.01.29 – 1979.10.16 see below)

Diocesan Bishops of Santíssima Conceição do Araguaia

- Patrício José Hanrahan, C.Ss.R. ( see above 1979.10.16 – 1993.05.25)
- Pedro José Conti (1995.12.27 – 2004.12.29), later Bishop of Macapá (Brazil) (2004.12.29 – ...)
- Dominique Marie Jean Denis You (2006.02.08 – present)

== Source and external links ==
- GCatholic.org, with incumbent biography links
- Catholic Hierarchy
