= José Vieira de Lima =

Brazilian Roman Catholic bishop (born 1931)

His Excellency, The Most Reverend José Vieira de Lima T.O.R.
- Bishop Emeritus of São Luíz de Cáceres
- Church: Roman Catholic Church
- Province: Cuiabá
- Appointed: 11 November 1998
- Term ended: 23 July 2008
- Predecessor: Paulo Antônio de Conto
- Successor: Antônio Emídio Vilar
- Other post: Bishop of Marabá (1990–1998)

Orders
- Ordination: 7 December 1958
- Consecration: 29 June 1990 by Paulo Evaristo Arns

Personal details
- Born: 10 June 1931 (age 94) Poconé, Mato Grosso, Brazil
- Denomination: Roman Catholic
- Motto: Servir – Não ser servido

José Vieira de Lima, T.O.R. (born 10 June 1931) is a Brazilian Roman Catholic prelate, who served as bishop of the Diocese of Marabá from 1990 to 1998 and later as bishop of the Diocese of São Luíz de Cáceres from 1998 until his retirement in 2008.

== Early life and priesthood ==
José Vieira de Lima was born on 10 June 1931 in Poconé, in the state of Mato Grosso, Brazil. He entered the Third Order Regular of St. Francis of Penance (T.O.R.), a branch of the Franciscan religious family, and professed on 14 July 1951. He was ordained a priest on 7 December 1958.

During his priestly ministry he served in several pastoral roles within the Church in Brazil and became active in ecclesiastical work associated with the Franciscan order and regional church structures.

== Episcopal ministry ==
On 18 April 1990, Pope John Paul II appointed Vieira de Lima as bishop of the Diocese of Marabá in the state of Pará.

He received episcopal consecration on 29 June 1990 from Paulo Evaristo Arns, Archbishop of São Paulo, with bishops Geraldo João Paulo Roger Verdier and José Afonso Ribeiro serving as co-consecrators.

On 11 November 1998 he was appointed bishop of the Diocese of São Luíz de Cáceres, in the ecclesiastical province of Cuiabá.

Pope Benedict XVI accepted his resignation from the pastoral governance of the diocese on 23 July 2008 upon reaching the canonical retirement age.

He became bishop emeritus of São Luíz de Cáceres.

== Later life ==
In 2021 Vieira de Lima celebrated his 90th birthday and more than seven decades dedicated to priestly ministry.
