= Territorial Prelature of Alto Xingu-Tucumã =

Catholic particular church territory

Territorial Prelature of Alto Xingu-Tucumã Praelatura Territorialis Xinguensis Superioris-Tucumanensis in Brasilia Prelazia Territorial de Alto Xingu-Tucumã
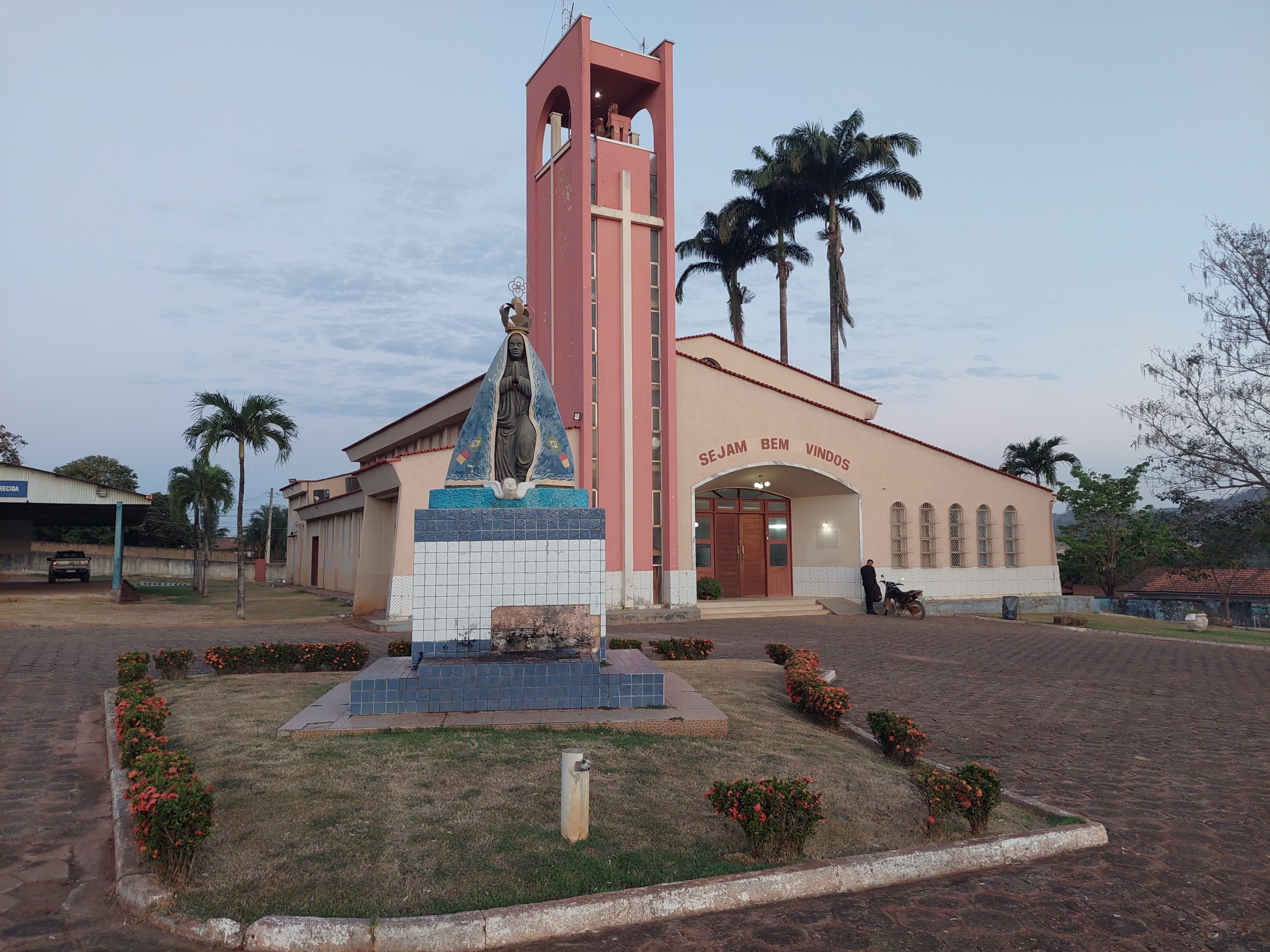
- Cathedral of Our Lady of Aparecida

Location
- Country: Brazil
- Ecclesiastical province: Santarém
- Metropolitan: Santarém

Statistics
- Area: 128,291 km^{2} (49,533 sq mi)
- Population: Total; Catholics: (as of 2019); 298,424; 130,000 (43.6%)

Information
- Rite: Latin Rite
- Established: 6 November 2019 (6 years ago)
- Cathedral: Cathedral of Our Lady of Aparecida in Tucumã

Current leadership
- Pope: Leo XIV
- Bishop: Jesús María López Mauléon, O.A.R.
- Metropolitan Archbishop: Irineu Roman

Website
- http://prelaziadoaltoxingu.org/

The Territorial Prelature of Alto Xingu-Tucumã (Latin: Praelatura Territorialis Xinguensis Superioris-Tucumanensis in Brasilia) is a Roman Catholic territorial prelature located in the city of Tucumã in the ecclesiastical province of Santarém in Brazil.

== History ==
On November 6, 2019, the Territorial Prelature of Itaituba was established from the territory of Territorial Prelature of Xingu and Diocese of Marabá. Pope Francis appointed Jesús María López Mauléon, O.A.R., as its first bishop.

== Leadership ==
- Prelates of Alto Xingu-Tucumã (Roman rite)
  - Bishop Jesús María López Mauléon, O.A.R. (November 6, 2019 – present)
