= Diocese of Guajará-Mirim =

Catholic ecclesiastical territory

Diocese of Guajará-Mirim Dioecesis Guaiaramirensis Diocese de Guajará-Mirim

Catholic

Location
- Country: Brazil
- Metropolitan: Archdiocese of Porto Velho
- Headquarters: Guajará-Mirim, Rondônia, Brazil

Statistics
- Area: 91,282 km^{2} (35,244 sq mi)
- Population: Total; Catholics: (as of 2023); 197,870; 113,000 (57.1%)
- Parishes: 13

Information
- Denomination: Catholic Church
- Sui iuris church: Latin Church
- Rite: Roman Rite
- Established: 1 March 1929; 97 years ago
- Cathedral: Catedral Nossa Senhora do Seringueiro
- Secular priests: 12 (11 Diocesan, 1 Religious Orders)

Current leadership
- Pope: Leo XIV
- Bishop-Elect: Leandro Machado Silvestre
- Metropolitan Archbishop: Roque Paloschi

Website
- www.dgm.org.br

The Roman Catholic Diocese of Guajará-Mirim (Latin: Dioecesis Guaiaramirensis) is a diocese located in the city of Guajará-Mirim in the ecclesiastical province of Porto Velho in Brazil.

== History ==
- 1 March 1929: Established as Territorial Prelature of Guajará-Mirim from Territorial Prelature of Porto Velho and Diocese of São Luíz de Cáceres
- 16 October 1979: Promoted as Diocese of Guajará-Mirim

== Leadership ==
=== Prelates of Guajará-Mirim ===
- Francisco Xavier Elias Pedro Paulo Rey, T.O.R. (19 May 1945 – 12 March 1966), resigned
- Luiz Roberto Gomes de Arruda, T.O.R. (12 March 1966 – 3 November 1978), resigned

=== Bishops of Guajará-Mirim ===
- Geraldo João Paulo Roger Verdier (31 July 1980 – 8 December 2011), resigned
- Benedito Araújo (8 December 2011 – 7 November 2025), appointed Bishop of Campo Maior, Piauí
- Leandro Machado Silvestre (21 October 2026 – Present)

=== Coadjutor bishops ===
- Luiz Roberto Gomes de Arruda, T.O.R. (1964-1966), as Coadjutor Prelate, succeeded
- Benedito Araújo (2011), succeeded

=== Auxiliary bishop ===
- José Maria Pinheiro (1997-2003), appointed Auxiliary Bishop of São Paulo
