= Summula =

Summula may refer to:

- a Summa, text that 'sums up' knowledge in a field, e.g. the compendiums of theology, philosophy and canon law which served as medieval textbooks in schools and books of reference
- Summula, Mauretania, Ancient city and bishopric in Roman Africa, now a Latin Catholic titular see
