= St. Joseph's Cathedral, Macapá =

St. Joseph's Cathedral
- Catedral São José
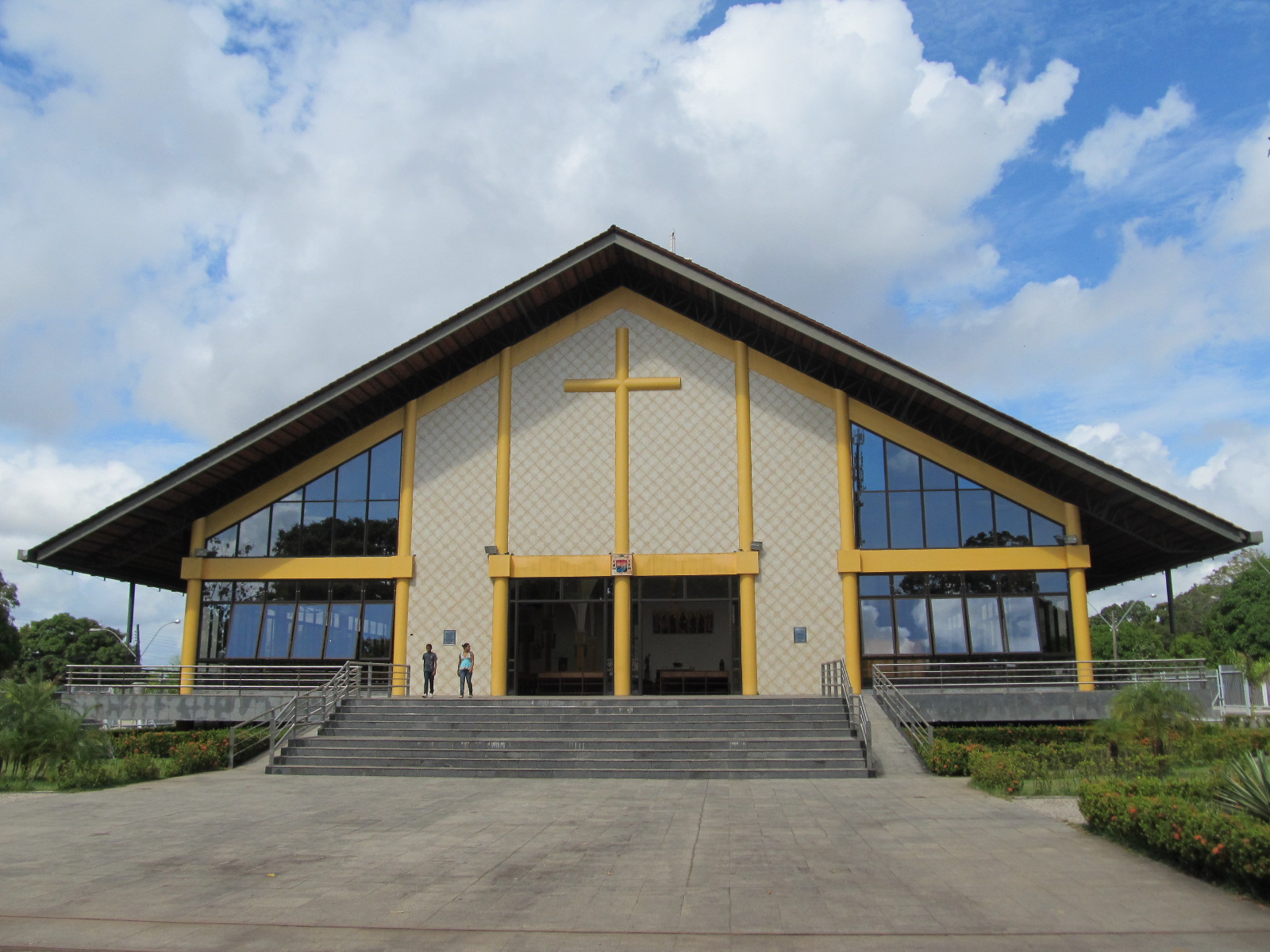
- St. Joseph's Cathedral
- Location: Macapá
- Country: Brazil
- Denomination: Roman Catholic Church

Administration
- Metropolis: Belém do Pará
- Diocese: Macapá

The St. Joseph's Cathedral (Portuguese: Catedral São José) Also Macapá Cathedral is a religious building belonging to the Catholic Church and serves as the cathedral of Macapá City north of the South American country of Brazil.

It is the mother church of the diocese of Macapá (Dioecesis Macapensis) that was created as a territorial prelature in 1949 through the bull Unius Apostolicae of Pope Pius XII and elevated to its current status in 1980 in the pontificate of John Paul II.

The present structure was inaugurated the 19 of March 2006, in the celebration of São José, patron of the city of Macapá, State of Amapá. The works began in 1996 through the financial support of the administrations, the state companies and the donations of the Catholic faithful.

== See also ==
- Roman Catholicism in Brazil
- St. Joseph's Cathedral
