= Territorial Prelature of Itaituba =

Catholic particular church territory

Territorial Prelature of Itaituba Praelatura Territorialis Itaitubaënsis Prelazia Territorial de Itaituba
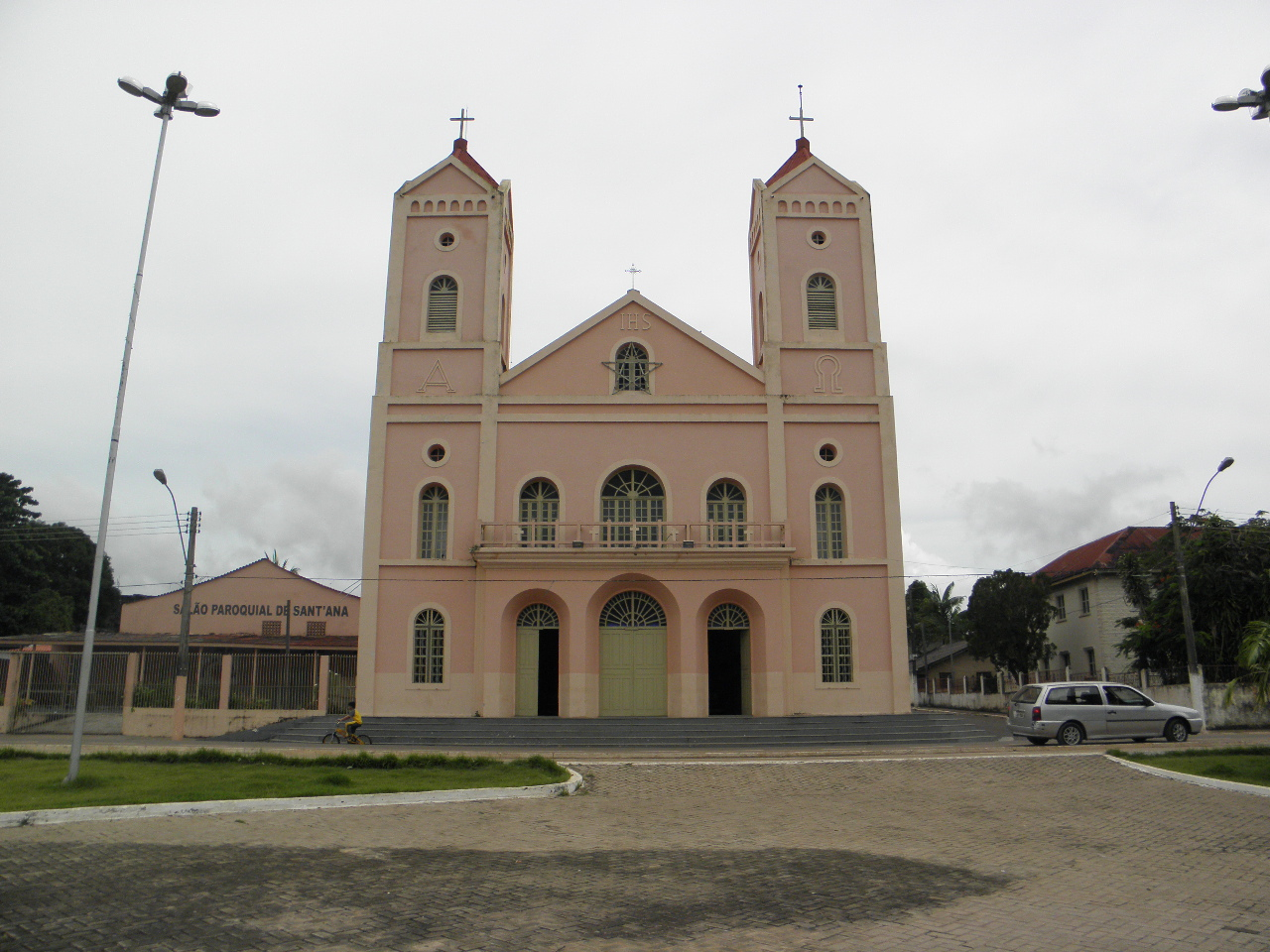
- Cathedral of St Anne in Itaituba in 2011

Location
- Country: Brazil
- Ecclesiastical province: Santarém
- Metropolitan: Santarém

Statistics
- Area: 175,000 km^{2} (68,000 sq mi)
- Population: Total; Catholics: (as of 2004); 201,700; 194,200 (96.3%)

Information
- Rite: Latin Rite
- Established: 6 July 1988 (37 years ago)
- Cathedral: Cathedral of St Anne in Itaituba

Current leadership
- Pope: Leo XIV
- Bishop: Vilmar Santin, O. Carm.
- Metropolitan Archbishop: Irineu Roman

Website
- Website

The Territorial Prelature of Itaituba (Latin: Praelatura Territorialis Itaitubaënsis) is a Roman Catholic territorial prelature located in the city of Itaituba in the ecclesiastical province of Santarém in Brazil.

== History ==
On July 6, 1988, the Territorial Prelature of Itaituba was established from the Diocese of Santarém.

On Wednesday, December 8, 2010, Pope Benedict XVI appointed Vilmar Santin, O. Carm., until then vicar of the parish of São Lázaro e Coração Imaculado de Maria, in the Roman Catholic Archdiocese of Manaus, as the new bishop prelate of Itaituba, succeeding Bishop Capistrano Francisco Heim, O.F.M., who had resigned on reaching the age limit of 75.

It became a suffragan of the Archdiocese of Santarém on 6 November 2019 with Diocese of Óbidos

== Parishes ==
Currently, the prelature has an approximate population of 201,700 inhabitants, with 96.3% being Catholic. The territory covers 175,000 km^{2}, organized into 9 parishes:

- Saint Anne Parish - Cathedral (Itaituba)
- Parish of Our Lady of Good Remedy (Itaituba)
- Saint Teresa Parish (Itaituba)
- Holy Trinity Parish (Rurópolis)
- Saint Lucy Parish (Novo Progresso)
- Parish of Our Lady of Aparecida (Trairão)
- St. Joseph the Worker Parish (Trairão)
- Saint Anthony of Padua Parish (Castelo dos Sonhos)
- Parish of Saint Anthony and Saint Peter (Jacareacanga)

== Leadership ==
- Prelates of Itaituba (Roman rite)
  - Bishop Capistrano Francisco Heim, O.F.M. (July 6, 1988 - December 8, 2010)
  - Bishop Vilmar Santin, O. Carm. (December 8, 2010 – present)
