= Roman Catholic Diocese of Santarém =

The Roman Catholic Diocese of Santarém may refer to:

- Roman Catholic Diocese of Santarém, Brazil, see Archdiocese of Santarém, Brazil
- Roman Catholic Diocese of Santarém, Portugal
