= Grechi =

Grechi is an Italian surname. Notable people with the surname include:

- Emma Grechi (born 1998), French golfer
- Moacyr Grechi (1936–2019), Brazilian Roman Catholic archbishop
