= Tefé (disambiguation) =

Tefé may refer to:

- Tefé, municipality in the state of Amazonas, Brazil
- Tefé River, river in the state of Amazonas, Brazil
- Tefé Airport, airport in Amazonas, Brazil
- Roman Catholic Territorial Prelature of Tefé, Catholic prelature in Brazil
- Tefé Holland, DC Comics fictional character
- Barão de Teffé (H-42), former Brazilian oceanographic research ship
