= Archdiocese of Santarém, Brazil =

Catholic ecclesiastical territory

Diocese of Santarém Archdioecesis Santaremensis Archdiocese of Santarém
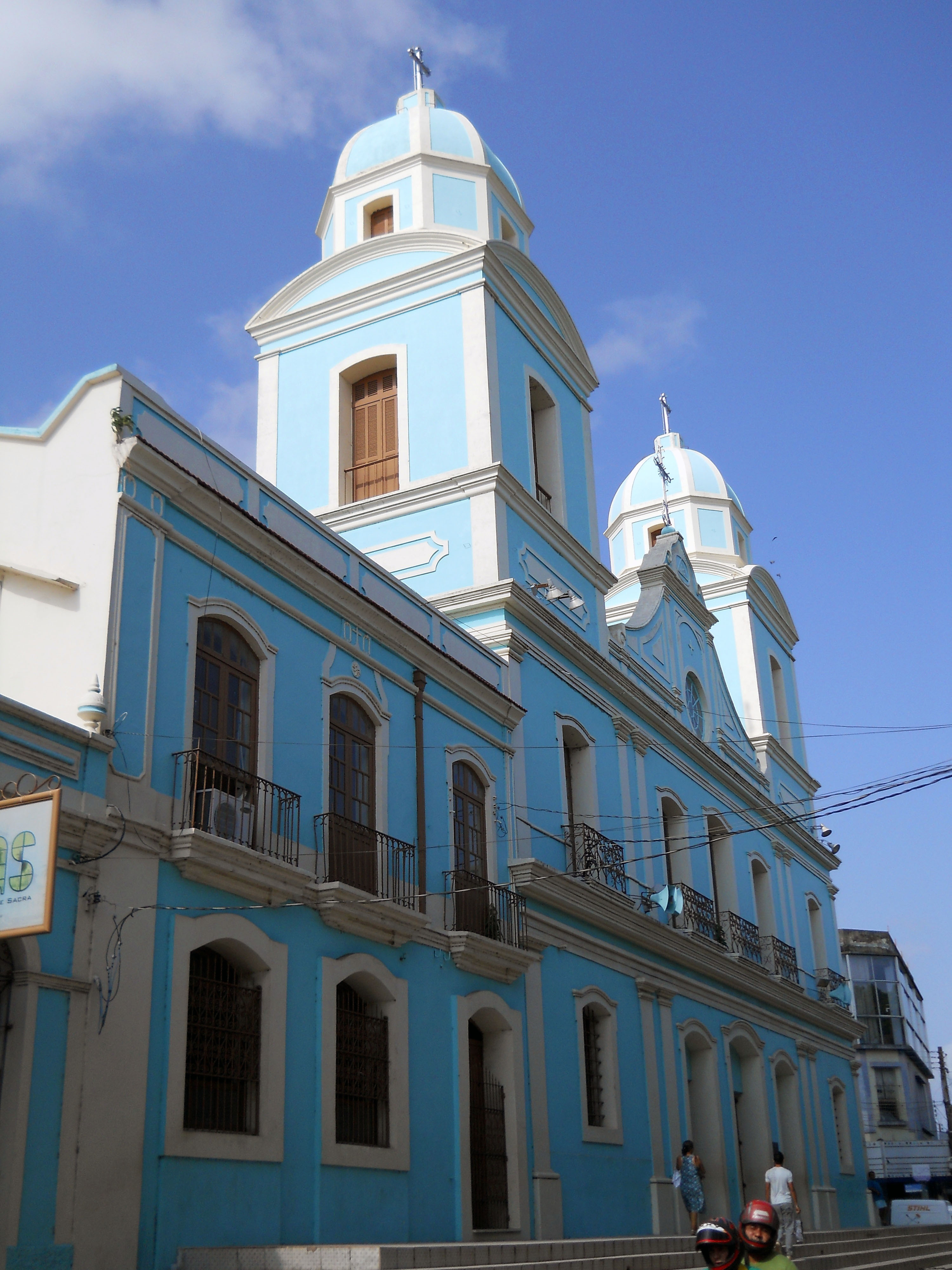
- Cathedral of Santarém

- Coat of arms

Location
- Country: Brazil

Statistics
- Area: 171,906 km^{2} (66,373 sq mi)
- Population: Total; Catholics: (as of 2010); 447,000; 295,936 (66.2%)

Information
- Rite: Roman Rite
- Established: 6 November 2019 (6 years ago)
- Cathedral: Cathedral of The Immaculate Conception in Santarém, Pará

Current leadership
- Pope: Leo XIV
- Archbishop: Irineu Roman

Website
- http://arquidiocesedesantarem.org.br/

The Roman Catholic Archdiocese of Santarém (Latin: Dioecesis Santaremensis) is a Latin Church metropolitan archdiocese in northern Brazil. It was a suffragan diocese in the ecclesiastical province of Belém do Pará until 6 November 2019.

Its cathedral episcopal see is Catedral Nossa Senhora da Conceição, dedicated to the Immaculate Conception, in the city of Santarém, Brazil.

== History ==
- Established on 21 September 1903 as Territorial Prelature of Santarém, with territory split off from the Diocese of Belém do Pará
- Lost territories:
  - 16 August 1934 to establish the Territorial Prelature of Xingu
  - 1 February 1949 to establish the Territorial Prelature of Macapá (later elevated to diocese status)
  - 10 April 1957 to establish the Territorial Prelature of Óbidos (later elevated to diocese status)
- Elevated on 16 October 1979 to Diocese of Santarém
- 6 July 1988, lost territory to establish the Territorial Prelature of Itaituba.
- Promoted on 6 November 2019 as Archdiocese of Santarém

== Statistics ==
As per 2014, it pastorally served 316,500 Catholics (70.2% of 451,000 total) on 171,906 km^{2} in 22 parishes with 53 priests (26 diocesan, 27 religious), 90 lay religious (39 brothers, 51 sisters) and 19 seminarians.

== Episcopal ordinaries ==
Territorial Prelates of Santarém

- Frederico Benício de Souza e Costa (22 September 1904 – 8 January 1907), next Bishop of Amazonas (Brazil, now Metropolitan Archdiocese of Manaus) (1907.01.08 – 1914.04.16), emeritate as Titular Bishop of Thubunæ in Numidia (1914.04.16 – death 1938.03.26)
- Amando Agostino Bahlmann, Order of Friars Minor (O.F.M.) (born Germany) (10 January 1907 – 5 March 1939), emeritate as Titular Bishop of Argos (1908.07.10 – death 1939.03.05)
- Apostolic Administrator Father Anselmo Pietrulla, O.F.M. (born Poland) (1941 – 1947.12.13)
- Anselmo Pietrulla, O.F.M. (13 December 1947 – 18 June 1949), Titular Bishop of Conana (1947.12.13 – 1949.06.18); later Apostolic Administrator of Territorial Prelature of Macapá (Brazil) (1949 – 1950.01.14), Bishop of Campina Grande (Brazil) (1949.06.18 – 1955.05.11), Bishop of Tubarão (Brazil) (1955.05.11 – retired 1981.09.17), died 1992
- João Floriano Loewenau, O.F.M. (born Poland) (8 September 1950 – 12 September 1957), Titular Bishop of Drivastum (1950.09.08 – death 1979.06.04), also next as Bishop-Prelate of Óbidos (Brazil) (1957.09.12 – 1972) and on emeritate
- Tiago Miguel Ryan, O.F.M. (born USA) (31 January 1958 – 16 October 1979 see below), Titular Bishop of Margum (1958.01.31 – 1978.05.26)

Suffragan Bishops of Santarém

- Tiago Miguel Ryan, O.F.M. (see above 16 October 1979 – retired 27 November 1985), died 2002
- Lino Vomboemmel, O.F.M. (27 November 1985 – death 28 February 2007); formerly Titular Bishop of Iunca in Byzacena (1981.05.25 – 1983.06.09), first as Auxiliary Bishop of Santarém (1981.05.25 – 1983.06.09) and then as Coadjutor Bishop of Santarém (1983.06.09 – succession 1985.11.27)
- Esmeraldo Barreto de Farias (28 February 2007 – 30 November 2011), previously Bishop of Paulo Afonso (Brazil) (2000.03.22 – 2007.02.28); later Metropolitan Archbishop of Porto Velho (Brazil) (2011.11.30 – 2015.03.18), then Titular Bishop of Summula (2015.03.18 – ...) as Auxiliary Bishop of São Luís do Maranhão (Brazil) (2015.03.18 – ...)
- Flávio Giovenale, S.D.B. (19 September 2012 – 19 September 2018), previously Bishop of Abaetetuba (Brazil) (1997.10.08 – 2012.09.19); appointed Bishop of Cruzeiro do Sul, Acre

Archbishops of Santarém

- Irineu Roman, C.S.I. (6 November 2019 – present)

== Other affiliated bishops ==
=== Coadjutor bishops ===
- Eduardo José Herberhold, O.F.M. (1928–1931), as Coadjutor Prelate; did not succeed to see; appointed Bishop of Ilhéus, Bahia
- Lino Vomboemmel, O.F.M. (1983–1985)

=== Auxiliary bishops ===
- Lino Vomboemmel, O.F.M. (1981–1983), appointed Coadjutor here
- Severino Batista de França, O.F.M. Cap. (2004–2007), appointed Bishop of Nazaré, Pernambuco

=== Other priest of this diocese who became bishop ===
- Gilberto Pastana de Oliveira, appointed Bishop of Imperatriz, Maranhão in 2005

== Ecclesiastical province ==
When it was raised to an Archdiocese, it was given three suffragans.

- Diocese of Óbidos
- Diocese of Xingu-Altamira
- Territorial Prelature of Alto Xingu-Tucumã
- Territorial Prelature of Itaituba

== See also ==
- List of Catholic dioceses in Brazil

== Sources and external links ==
- GCatholic.org, with Google map and satellite photo - data for all sections
- Catholic Hierarchy
- Herbermann, Charles, ed. (1913). "Santarem" . Catholic Encyclopedia. New York: Robert Appleton Company.
