= José Foralosso =

José Foralosso SDB
- Bishop of Marabá
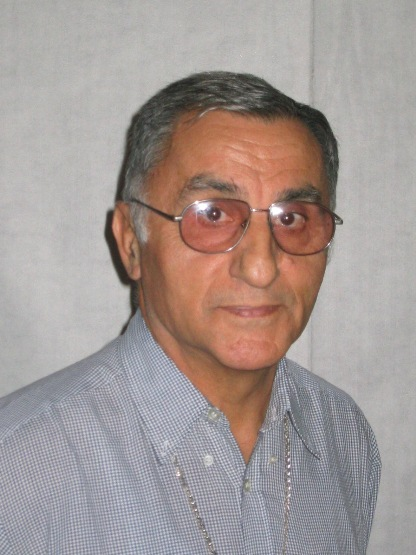
- Church: Catholic Church
- Diocese: Diocese of Marabá
- In office: 12 January 2000 – 25 April 2012
- Predecessor: José Vieira de Lima
- Successor: Vital Corbellini
- Previous post: Bishop of Guiratinga (1991-2000)

Orders
- Ordination: 22 December 1966
- Consecration: 15 November 1992 by Bonifácio Piccinini

Personal details
- Born: Giuseppe Foralosso; 15 March 1938 Cervarese Santa Croce, Province of Padua, Kingdom of Italy
- Died: 22 August 2012 (aged 74)

Giuseppe "José" Foralosso (15 March 1938 – 22 August 2012) was the Roman Catholic bishop of the Roman Catholic Diocese of Marabá, Brazil.

Ordained to the priesthood in 1966, Foralosso was named bishop in 1991. He resigned in 2012.
