= Estêvão Cardoso de Avellar =

- Bishop of Diocese of Uberlândia (emeritus)
- Church: Roman Catholic Church
- See: Diocese of Uberlândia
- In office: 1978 - 1992
- Predecessor: Almir Marques Ferreira
- Successor: José Alberto Moura
- Previous post: Priest

Orders
- Ordination: October 6, 1946

Personal details
- Born: November 4, 1917 Três Corações, Brazil
- Died: December 3, 2009 (aged 92)

Estêvão Cardoso de Avellar (November 4, 1917 – December 3, 2009) was a Brazilian bishop of the Roman Catholic Church.

== Biography ==
Cardoso de Avella was born in Três Corações, Brazil, and was ordained a priest on October 6, 1946. He was appointed Coadjutor Prelate of the Diocese of Marabá along with being appointed Titular bishop of Eucarpia on August 6, 1971, and then ordained on September 26, 1971. On March 27, 1976, he was appointed prelate of Diocese of Santíssima Conceição do Araguaia. His final appointment came on March 20, 1978, to the Diocese of Uberlândia, where he retired from on December 23, 1992.
