= Sacred Heart of Jesus Cathedral, Porto Velho =

Sacred Heart of Jesus Cathedral
- Catedral Sagrado Coração de Jesus
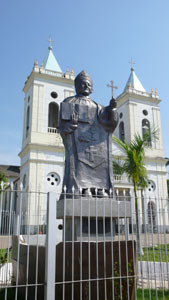
- Sacred Heart of Jesus Cathedral
- Location: Porto Velho
- Country: Brazil
- Denomination: Roman Catholic Church

Administration
- Archdiocese: Porto Velho

The Sacred Heart of Jesus Cathedral (Portuguese: Catedral Sagrado Coração de Jesus), also Porto Velho Cathedral, is the seat of the Roman Catholic Archdiocese of Porto Velho, in the state of Rondônia, in the South American country of Brazil. Despite having an act of laying its first stone on May 3, 1917 - with the presence of the Bishop of Amazonas, Joao Joffily Ireneo, and the Municipal Superintendent, Joaquim Augusto Tanajura - it was only in 1927 that the cathedral began Really its construction.

At the same time, the temple is of Roman and Gothic style, since in its interior it is of gothic style, and out of Roman style, reason why it is said that it is of mixed style. It was Built in a space selected in 1917 by Archbishop Joffily himself, his current location corresponds to the eastern end of the Caiari district, in front of the Town Hall of Porto Velho. The first Mass celebrated in the chapel of the provisional Sacred Heart of Jesus was led by Father Antonio Carlos Peixoto, on the morning of November 10, 1926, with the help of the municipal prefect, Prudencio Bogéa de Sá.

== See also ==
- Roman Catholicism in Brazil
- Sacred Heart of Jesus
