= Summula, Mauretania =

Ancient city and bishopric in Roman North Africa

Roman Empire - Mauretania Caesariensis (125 AD)

Summula was an ancient city and bishopric in Roman North Africa. It is now a Latin Catholic titular see.

== History ==
Summula was one of many cities in the Roman province of Mauretania Caesariensis, important enough to become a suffragan diocese, but faded completely, plausibly at the 7th century advent of Islam.

Its only recorded residential bishop was Quodvultdeus, one of the Catholic bishops participating at the Carthage Council in 484 called by king Huneric of the Vandal Kingdom in 484, after which most of the Catholic episcopate was exiled.

== Titular see ==
The diocese was nominally restored in 1933 as Latin titular bishopric of Summula (Latin = Curiate Italian) / Summulen(sis) (Latin adjective).

It has had the following incumbents, so far of the fitting episcopal (lowest) rank:

- Francesco Sanmartino (1966.04.07 – death 1983.03.21) (Italian) as Auxiliary Bishop of Archdiocese of Turin (Turin, Italy) (1966.04.07 – retired 1977.07) and on emeritate
- Claude Henri Édouard Frikart, Eudists (C.I.M.) (French) (1986.06.21 – death 2014.12.18) as emeritate; previously Auxiliary Bishop of Archdiocese of Paris (France) (1986.06.21 – 1997.09.02)
- Esmeraldo Barreto de Farias, Association of Priests of Prado (2015.03.18 – ...), Auxiliary Bishop of Archdiocese of São Luís do Maranhão (Brazil) (2015.03.18 – ...); previously Bishop of Paulo Afonso (Brazil) (2000.03.22 – 2007.02.28), Bishop of Santarém (Brazil) (2007.02.28 – 2011.11.30), Metropolitan Archbishop of Porto Velho (Brazil) (2011.11.30 – resigned 2015.03.18).

== See also ==
- List of Catholic dioceses in Algeria
- Summa, a titular see in Numidia
- summ(ul)a in science
