= Diocese of Uberlândia =

Catholic ecclesiastical territory

Diocese of Uberlândia Dioecesis Fertiliensis

Catholic

Location
- Country: Brazil
- Ecclesiastical province: Uberaba

Statistics
- Area: 13,853 km^{2} (5,349 sq mi)
- Population: Total; Catholics: (as of 2004); 810,000; 598,000 (73.8%)
- Parishes: 52

Information
- Denomination: Roman Catholic
- Rite: Latin Rite
- Established: 22 July 1961 (65 years ago)
- Cathedral: Catedral Santa Teresinha

Current leadership
- Pope: Leo XIV
- Bishop: Paulo Francisco Machado
- Metropolitan Archbishop: Paulo Mendes Peixoto

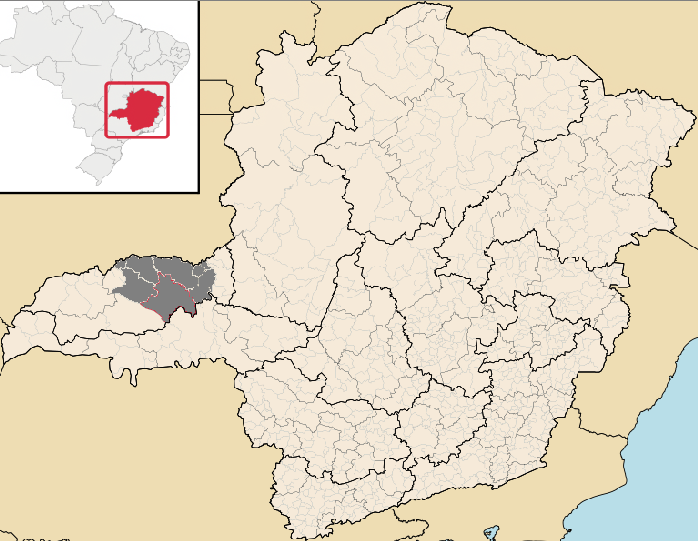
Mapa of the diocese.

The Roman Catholic Diocese of Uberlândia (Latin: Dioecesis Fertiliensis) is a diocese located in the city of Uberlândia in the ecclesiastical province of Uberaba in Brazil.

== History ==
- 22 July 1961: Established as Diocese of Uberlândia from the Diocese of Uberaba

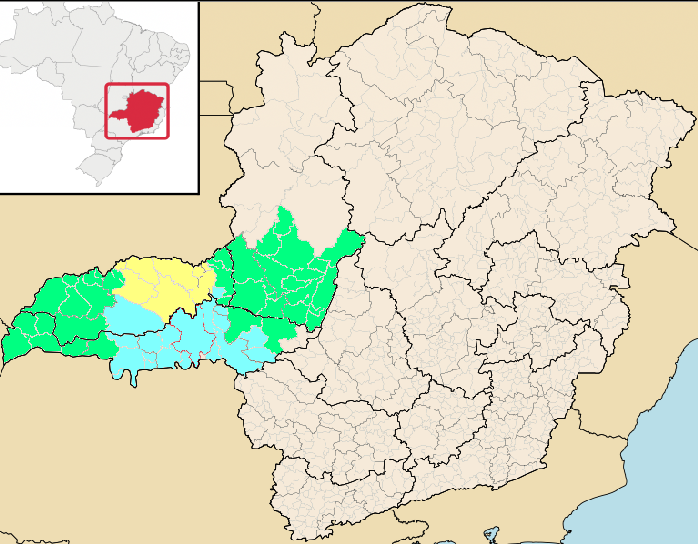
Ecclesiastical Province of Uberaba.

== Bishops ==
- Bishops of Uberlândia (Roman rite), in reverse chronological order
  - Bishop Paulo Francisco Machado (2008.01.02 – present)
  - Bishop José Alberto Moura, C.S.S. (1992.12.23 – 2007.02.07), appointed Archbishop of Montes Claros, Minas Gerais
  - Bishop Estêvão Cardoso de Avellar, O.P. (1978.03.20 – 1992.12.23)
  - Bishop Almir Marques Ferreira (1961.08.19 – 1977.12.01)

=== Coadjutor bishops ===
- Onofre Cândido Rosa, S.D.B. (1971-1977), did not succeed to see; appointed Coadjutor Bishop of Corumbá, Mato Grosso do Sul
- José Alberto Moura, C.S.S. (1990-1992)

=== Auxiliary bishop ===
- Onofre Cândido Rosa, S.D.B. (1970-1971), appointed Coadjutor here
