= Diocese of Rio Branco =

Catholic ecclesiastical territory

Coordinates: 9°58′S 67°48′W

Diocese of Rio Branco Dioecesis Fluminis Albi Superioris

Catholic
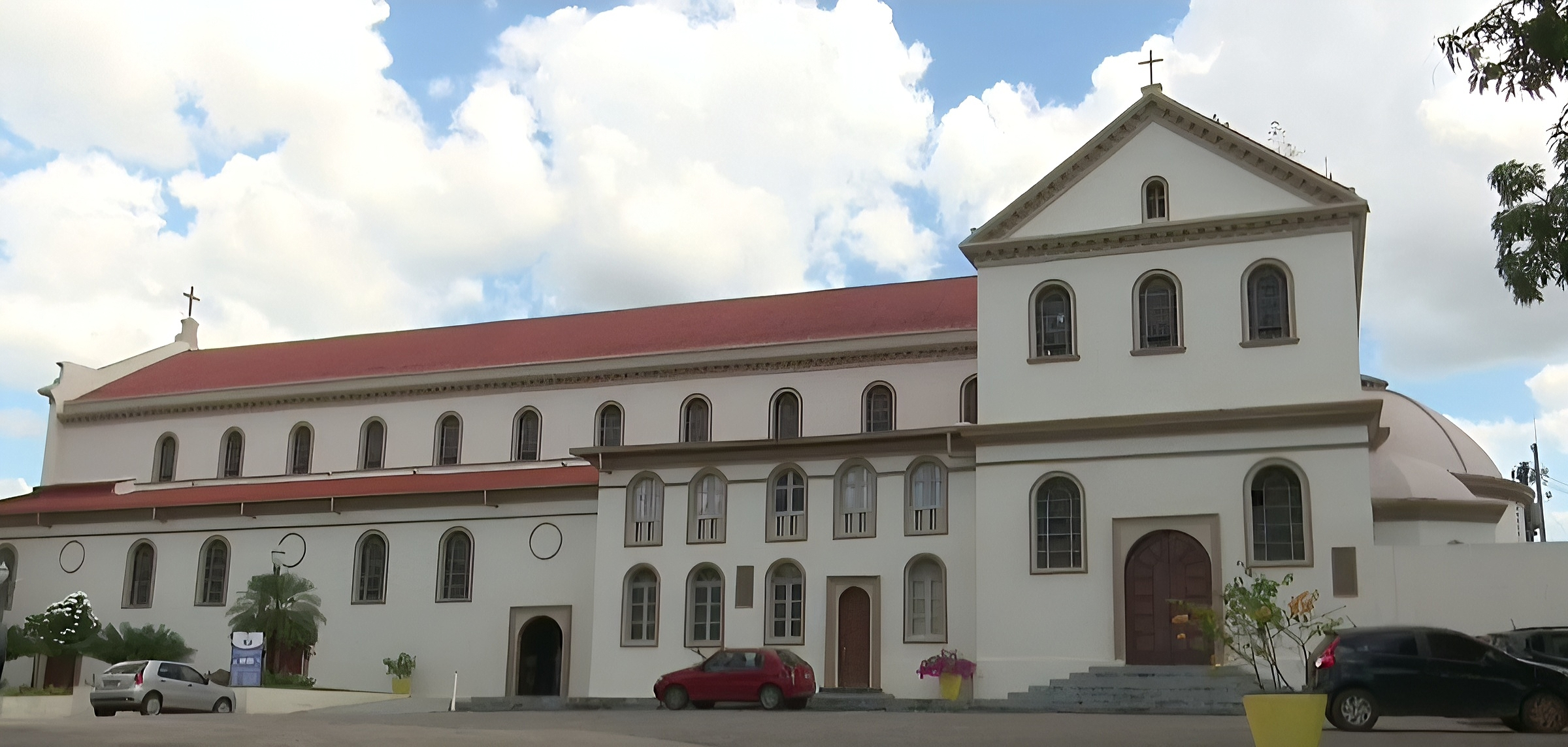
- Cathedral of Our Lady of Nazareth

Location
- Country: Brazil
- Ecclesiastical province: Porto Velho

Statistics
- Area: 102,595 km^{2} (39,612 sq mi)
- Population: Total; Catholics: (as of 2023); 701,163; 502,500 (71.7%)
- Parishes: 43

Information
- Denomination: Catholic Church
- Sui iuris church: Latin Church
- Rite: Roman Rite
- Established: 4 October 1919; 107 years ago
- Cathedral: Catedral Nossa Senhora de Nazaré
- Secular priests: 41 (25 Diocesan, 16 Religious Orders)

Current leadership
- Pope: Leo XIV
- Bishop: Sede Vacante
- Metropolitan Archbishop: Roque Paloschi
- Apostolic Administrator: Antônio Fontinele de Melo
- Bishops emeritus: Joaquín Pertíñez Fernández, O.A.R.

Website
- Official Website

The Roman Catholic Diocese of Rio Branco (Latin: Dioecesis Fluminis Albi Superioris) is a Latin suffragan see in the ecclesiastical province of the Metropolitan Archbishop of Porto Velho (Rondônia), in the upper Amazon River basin).

Its cathedral episcopal see is the Marian Catedral Nossa Senhora de Nazaré, dedicated to Our Lady of Nazareth, in the city of Rio Branco, Acre state, Brazil.

== History ==
On 4 October 1919, Pope Benedict XV established the Territorial Prelature of Acre and Purus (Italian Acre e Purus), named after the Amazonian rivers Acre and Purus, on canonical territory split off from the then Diocese of Amazonas.

Pope Pius XI changed the name of the prelature to the Territorial Prelature of São Peregrino Laziosi no Alto Acre e Alto Purus on 10 December 1926, but its original name was restored on 26 April 1958 by Pope Pius XII.

The territorial prelature was elevated to a bishopric and hence renamed after its see as Diocese of Rio Branco by Saint John Paul II on 15 February 1986.

== Statistics ==
As of 2023, it pastorally serves 502,500 Catholics (71.7% of 701,163 total) on 102,595km^{2} in 43 parishes with 41 priests (25 diocesan, 16 religious), 41 deacons and 82 lay religious (22 brothers, 60 sisters).

== Ordinaries ==
(all Roman Rite)

=== Territorial Bishop-Prelates of Acre and Purus ===
- Geraldo Van Caloen, O.S.B. (12 Mar 1906 – 13 Dec 1907)
- Próspero Gustavo Bernardi, O.S.M. (15 Dec 1919 – 10 Dec 1926 see below)

=== Territorial Bishop-Prelates of São Peregrino Laziosi no Alto Acre e Alto Purus ===
- Próspero M. Gustavo Bernardi, O.S.M. (see above 10 Dec 1926 – 1 Feb 1944)
  - Apostolic Administrator Antônio Julio Maria Mattioli, S.M. (1941 – 10 Jan 1948 see below)
- Antônio Julio Maria Mattioli, S.M. (see above 10 Jan 1948 – 26 Apr 1958 see below)

=== Territorial Bishop-Prelates of Acre and Purus ===
- Antônio Julio Maria Mattioli, S.M. (see above 26 Apr 1958 – 13 Apr 1962)
- Giocondo Maria Grotti, O.S.M. (16 Nov 1962 – 28 Sep 1971)
- Moacyr Grechi, O.S.M. (10 Jul 1972 – 15 Feb 1986 see below)

=== Suffragan Bishops of Rio Branco ===
- Moacyr Grechi, O.S.M. (see above 15 Feb 1986 – 29 Jul 1998), appointed Archbishop of Porto Velho, Rondônia
- Joaquín Pertíñez Fernández, O.A.R. (24 Feb 1999 – 1 Jul 2026), resigned
  - Apostolic Administrator Antônio Fontinele de Melo (1 Jul 2026 – Present)

== See also ==
- List of Catholic dioceses in Brazil

== Sources and external links ==
- GCatholic
