= José Martins da Silva =

Roman Catholic archbishop

José Martins da Silva SDN
- Archbishop of Porto Velho
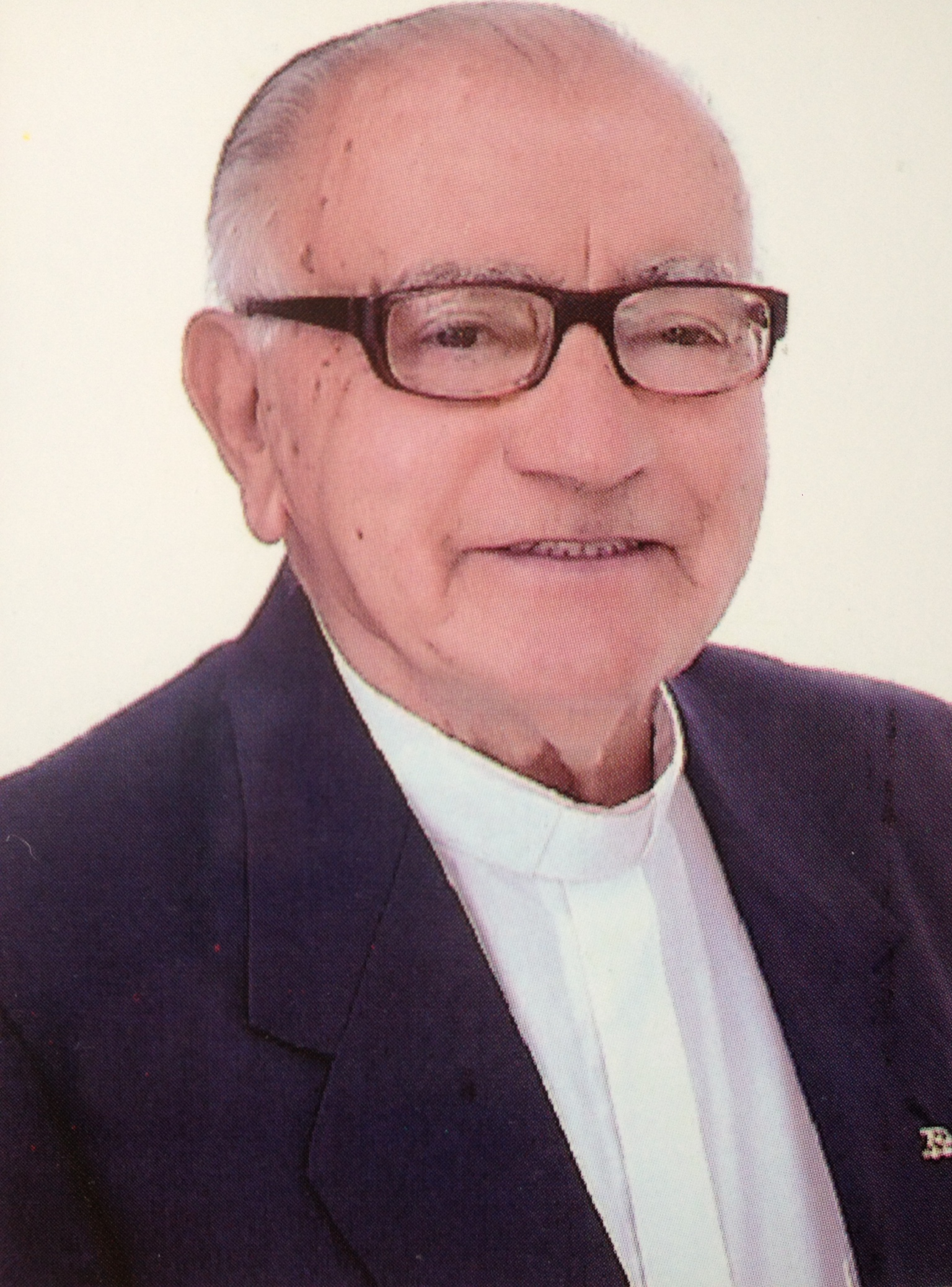
- Church: Catholic Church
- Archdiocese: Archdiocese of Porto Velho
- In office: 4 October 1982 – 3 September 1997
- Predecessor: João Batista Costa
- Successor: Moacyr Grechi
- Previous post: Prelate of Vila Rondônia (1978-1982)

Orders
- Ordination: 29 June 1963
- Consecration: 2 April 1978 by Belchior Joaquim da Silva Neto

Personal details
- Born: 14 June 1936 Tiros, Minas Gerais, Republic of the United States of Brazil
- Died: 29 January 2015 (aged 78)

José Martins da Silva (14 June 1936 – 29 January 2015) was a Roman Catholic archbishop.

Ordained to the priesthood in 1963, Martins da Silva was named bishop in 1978 and then Archbishop of Porto Velho, Brazil in 1982 and resigned in 1997.
