= Capistrano Francisco Heim =

American-born Brazilian Roman Catholic bishop (1934–2020)

Capistrano Francisco Heim O.F.M. (21 January 1934 – 24 September 2020) was an American-born Brazilian Roman Catholic bishop. Heim was born in Catskill, New York as William Charles Heim. He attended St. Patrick's Academy in Catskill. From 1954 to 1957, Heim was in the army and served in Southern California at the end of the Korean War. After military service, he studied biology at Siena College with the intention of becoming a veterinarian. However, he decided to pursue a religious vocation, entering the Order of Friars Minor seminary in Callicoon, New York, taking his first vows on 15 July 1960, and was ordained to the priesthood on 18 December 1965. Heim completed his theological studies in Petrópolis, Brazil, where he learned Portuguese and prepared to serve in the Franciscan missions in Goias, Brazil. Following a sabbatical year in Jerusalem, in 1988 he was named bishop of the Roman Catholic Territorial Prelature of Itaituba, Brazil by Pope John Paul II and served in this capacity until his mandatory retirement in 2011. During this time, he oversaw the development of pastoral and training centers and a radio station focused on faith formation and a comprehensive health program for poor mothers and their children. He returned to the United States and lived in New York and New Jersey until his death in 2020.
