= Erwin Kräutler =

Austrian Catholic bishop (born 1939)

- Prelate emeritus of Xingu
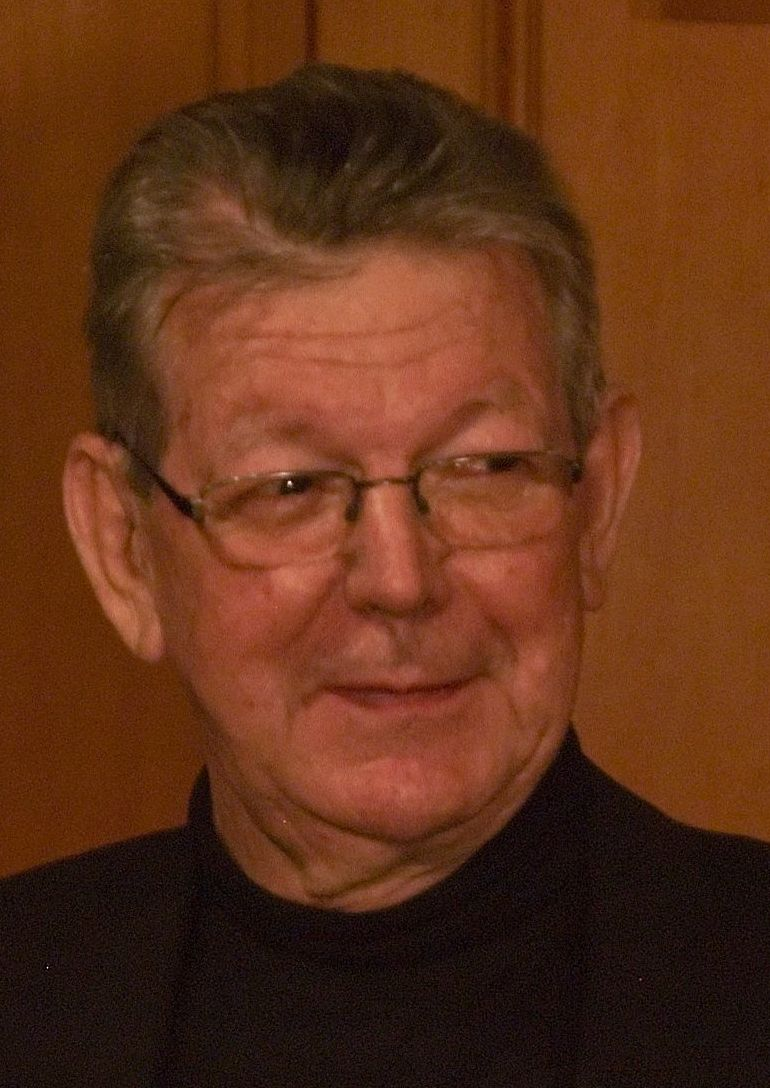
- Erwin Kräutler in 2010
- Province: Belém do Pará
- Diocese: Territorial Prelature of Xingu
- Installed: 2 September 1981
- Term ended: 23 December 2015
- Predecessor: Eurico Kräutler
- Successor: João Muniz Alves

Orders
- Ordination: 3 July 1965
- Consecration: 25 January 1981

Personal details
- Born: 12 July 1939 (age 87) Koblach, Austria, Nazi Germany
- Denomination: Roman Catholic Church
- Parents: Heinrich and Maria Kräutler
- Education: University of Salzburg

Erwin Kräutler C.Pp.S. (born 12 July 1939) is an Austrian Catholic bishop who headed the Territorial Prelature of Xingu from 1981 until 2015.

== Biography ==
Erwin Kräutler was born in Koblach, Austria, on 12 July 1939. As a teenager he was drawn to the Catholic Youth Worker movement (Note: More extensive coverage of this movement is available under its French and German names: Jeunesse ouvrière chrétienne and Christliche Arbeiterjugend.) and the model offered by French worker priests, as well as the vocation of his uncle, a missionary in Brazil. He was ordained a priest on 3 July 1965 and became a missionary in Brazil later that year and has spent his entire career there. He became a Brazilian citizen in 1978, retaining his Austrian citizenship.

On 7 November 1980, Pope John Paul II appointed him coadjutor prelate of Xingu. Upon the resignation of Eurico Kräutler, his uncle, he became Prelate of Xingu on 2 September 1981. The prelature encompasses an area the size of Germany; it has 600 Catholic communities served by eighteen priests. Between 1983 and 1991 and again beginning in 2006 he served as President of the Indigenous Missionary Council of the Brazilian Catholic Church.

In 1992, when Archbishop Georg Eder of Salzburg cancelled his scheduled speech at the university there, he spoke to an overflow crowd instead at Vienna City Hall at the invitation of the Mayor, Helmut Zilk. (Note: Kräutler had been invited as part of the school's program marking the 500th anniversary of Columbus' landing in the Western Hemisphere.)

In 2004, the German think tank GLOBALART gave him their annual award. In 2010 he received the Right Livelihood Award for his defense of and advocacy for the rights of indigenous peoples. In the 1980s, he helped secure the inclusion of indigenous peoples' rights in the Brazilian constitution. He also plays an important role in opposing the Belo Monte Dam. Opponents of his activism have responded with violence on several occasions. For supporting striking workers in 1983 he was arrested and beaten by military police. An attempted assassination staged as a car accident left him badly injured in 1987. He was given police protections when targeted with death threats for opposing the Belo Monte dam.

On 14 April 2014, he met with Pope Francis and provided him with information on Amazonia to his work on the ecology-themed encyclical Laudato si' (2015). He published his memoirs in 2014, Mein Leben für Amazonien (My Life for Amazonia). (Note: The Italian translation is titled Ho udito il grido dell’Amazzonia (I heard the cry of the Amazon).)

He retired at the age of 76 upon the appointment of his successor in Xingu on 23 December 2015.

On 8 March 2018, Pope Francis appointed him to the 15-person council responsible for planning the Synod of Bishops for the Pan-Amazon region. On 9 October 2019, the third day of that Synod, Kräutler said that thousands of communities in the region "do not celebrate the Eucharist except perhaps one, two or three times a year", that he and his colleagues did not oppose celibacy but "just want these brothers and sisters of ours not to have just a celebration of the word but also the celebration of the Eucharist". He expressed his own support for the ordination of women but doubted it had widespread support. (Note: The official doctrine of the Catholic Church holds that "the Church has no authority whatsoever to confer priestly ordination on women".) He also told reporters he thought than two-thirds of synod participants "are in favor of the ordination of married men" and that "many of the bishops are in favor of the ordination of female deacons". (Note: When the synod participants elected four members of the committee to draft its final report, Kräutler was a leading candidate until another Brazilian was chosen.)

== Notes ==
Catholic Church titles
Preceded by Eurico Kräutler	Prelate of Xingu; 1981 – 2015	Succeeded by Joao Muniz Alves
