= José Afonso Ribeiro =

Brazilian bishop (1929–2009)

José Afonso Ribeiro T.O.R.
- Prelate of Borba
- Church: Catholic Church
- Diocese: Diocese of Borba
- In office: 6 July 1988 – 3 May 2006
- Predecessor: Adriano Jaime Miriam Veigle
- Successor: Elói Roggia
- Previous posts: Titular Bishop of Bagis (1979-1988); Auxiliary Bishop of São Luíz de Cáceres (1979-1988)

Orders
- Ordination: 7 December 1958
- Consecration: 5 May 1979 by Carmine Rocco

Personal details
- Born: 28 October 1929 Poconé, Mato Grosso, Republic of the United States of Brazil
- Died: 10 November 2009 (aged 80)

José Afonso Ribeiro T.O.R. (28 October 1929 – 10 November 2009) was the Roman Catholic bishop of the Territorial Prelature of Borba, Brazil.

Ordained to the priesthood on 7 December 1958, Ribeiro was named auxiliary bishop on 29 January 1974 and was ordained on 5 May 1974. On 6 July 1986, he was named bishop of Borba, retiring on 3 May 2006.
