= Diocese of Borba =

Catholic particular church territory

Diocese of Borba Dioecesis Borbensis

Catholic
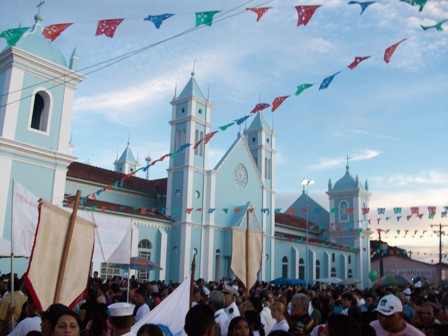
- Prelatial Cathedral Basilica of St. Anthony of Padua

Location
- Country: Brazil
- Ecclesiastical province: Manaus

Statistics
- Area: 170,000 km^{2} (66,000 sq mi)
- Population: Total; Catholics: (as of 2004); 190,000; 155,000 (81.6%)

Information
- Rite: Latin Rite
- Established: 13 July 1963 (63 years ago)
- Cathedral: Catedral Prelatícia Basílica Santo Antônio de Pádua

Current leadership
- Pope: Leo XIV
- Bishop: Zenildo Luiz Pereira da Silva, C.Ss.R.
- Metropolitan Archbishop: Sérgio Eduardo Castriani, C.S.Sp.
- Bishops emeritus: Elói Róggia, S.A.C.

The Roman Catholic Diocese of Borba (Latin: Dioecesis Borbensis) is a Roman Catholic diocese located in the city of Borba, Amazonas, in the ecclesiastical province of Manaus in Brazil.

== History ==
- 13 July 1963: Established as Territorial Prelature of Borba from the Metropolitan Archdiocese of Manaus and Territorial Prelature of Parintins
- 18 November 2022: Promoted as Diocese of Borba

== Bishops ==
- Prelates of Borba (Latin Rite)
  - Adriano Jaime Miriam Veigle, T.O.R. (1964.06.18 – 1988.07.06)
  - José Afonso Ribeiro, T.O.R. (1988.07.06 – 2006.05.03)
  - Elói Róggia, S.A.C. (2006.05.03 – 2017.09.20)
  - Zenildo Luiz Pereira da Silva, C.Ss.R. (2017.09.20 - 2022.11.18)
- Diocesan Bishops
  - Zenildo Luiz Pereira da Silva, C.Ss.R. (since 2022.11.18)

=== Coadjutor bishop ===
- Zenildo Luiz Pereira da Silva, C.Ss.R. (2016-2017)
