= Diocese of Óbidos =

Catholic ecclesiastical territory

Diocese of Óbidos Dioecesis Obidensis Diocese de Óbidos
- Cathedral of St Anne

Location
- Country: Brazil
- Ecclesiastical province: Santarém

Statistics
- Area: 182,960 km^{2} (70,640 sq mi)
- Population: Total; Catholics: (as of 2004); 201,063; 167,379 (83.2%)

Information
- Rite: Latin Rite
- Established: 10 April 1957 (69 years ago)
- Cathedral: Cathedral of St Anne in Óbidos, Pará

Current leadership
- Pope: Leo XIV
- Bishop: Bernardo Johannes Bahlmann, O.F.M.
- Metropolitan Archbishop: Irineu Roman
- Bishops emeritus: Martinho Lammers, O.F.M.

Website
- Website of the Diocese

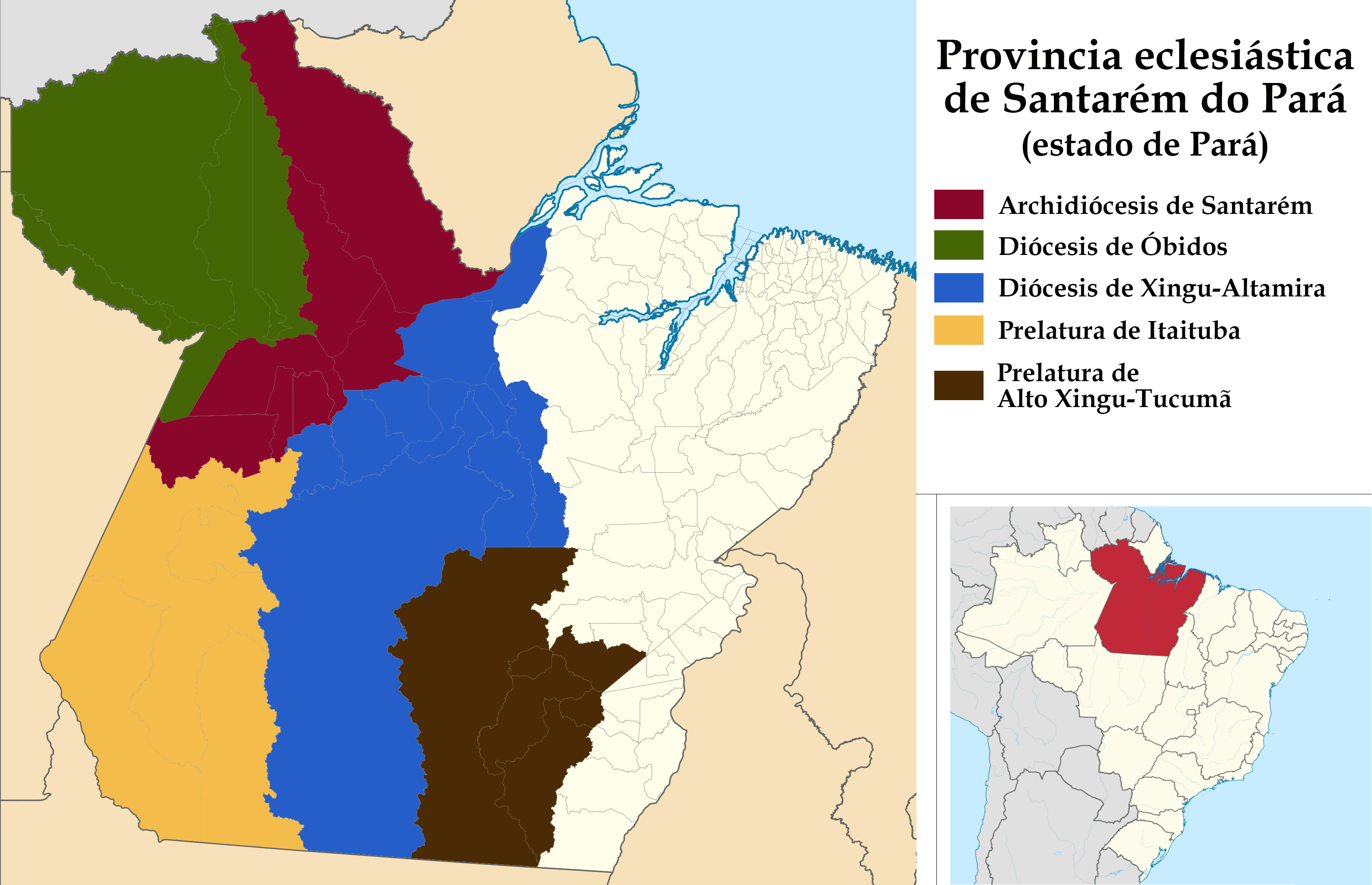
Catholic dioceses of the Ecclesiastical Province of Santarém, in the state of Pará, Modern Day Brazil (Óbidos in Green)

The Diocese of Óbidos (Latin: Dioecesis Obidensis) is a Roman Catholic diocese located in the city of Óbidos. It was a suffragan of the ecclesiastical province of Belém do Pará in Brazil until 6 November 2019 when it became a suffragan of the Archdiocese of Santarém.

== History ==
- On 10 April 1957, the Territorial Prelature of Óbidos was created from the Territorial Prelature of Santarém
- On 9 November 2011, the Territorial Prelature was elevated to a diocese

== Leadership ==
Bishops of Óbidos

- Bishop Bernardo Johannes Bahlmann, O.F.M. (9 November 2011 – present)

Prelates of Óbidos

- Bishop Bernardo Johannes Bahlmann, O.F.M. (28 January 2009 - 9 November 2011)
- Bishop Martinho Lammers, O.F.M. (19 July 1976 – 28 January 2009)
- Bishop Constantino José Lüers, O.F.M. (13 April 1973 – 24 March 1976), appointed Bishop of Penedo, Alagoas
- Bishop João Floriano Loewenau, O.F.M. (12 September 1957 - 1972)
