= Diocese of Macapá =

Catholic ecclesiastical territory

Diocese of Macapá Dioecesis Macapensis Diocese de Macapá
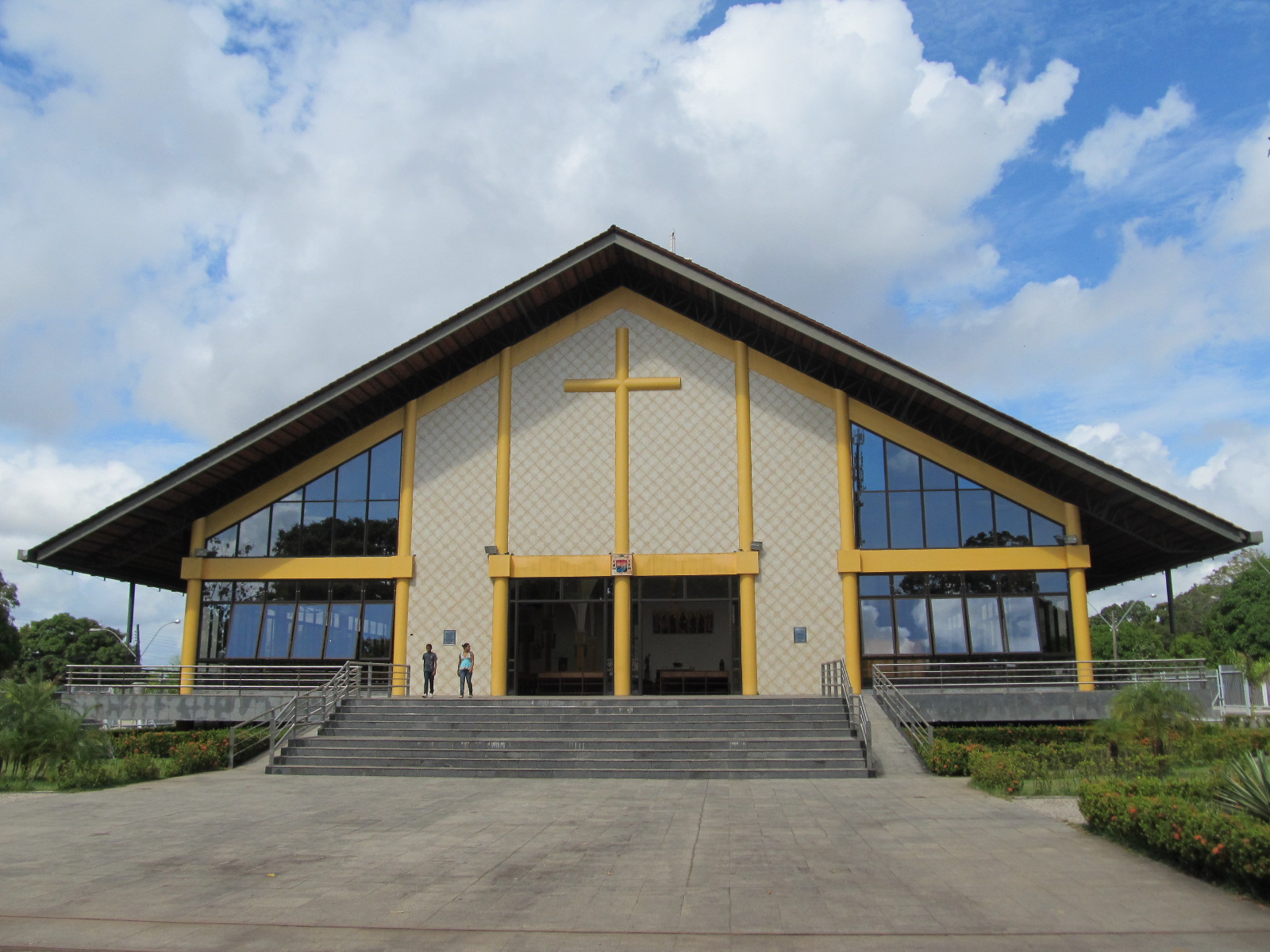
- Saint Joseph Cathedral

Location
- Country: Brazil
- Ecclesiastical province: Belém do Pará
- Metropolitan: Belém do Pará

Statistics
- Area: 148,000 km^{2} (57,000 sq mi)
- Population: Total; Catholics: (as of 2023); 774,268; 508,070 (65.6%)

Information
- Denomination: Catholic Church
- Rite: Latin Rite
- Established: 1 February 1949 (77 years ago)
- Cathedral: Cathedral of St Joseph in Macapá

Current leadership
- Pope: Leo XIV
- Bishop: Antônio de Assis Ribeiro, SDB
- Metropolitan Archbishop: Júlio Endi Akamine
- Bishops emeritus: Pedro José Conti

Website
- www.diocesedemacapa.com.br

The Roman Catholic Diocese of Macapá (Latin: Dioecesis Macapensis) is a diocese located in the city of Macapá in the ecclesiastical province of Belém do Pará in Brazil.

== History ==
- February 1, 1949: Established as Territorial Prelature of Macapá from the Territorial Prelature of Santarém
- October 30, 1980: Promoted as Diocese of Macapá

== Leadership ==
- Bishops of Macapá (Roman rite)
  - Bishop Antônio de Assis Ribeiro (2024.12.18 – Present)
  - Bishop Pedro José Conti (2004.12.29 – 2024.12.18)
  - Bishop Giovanni Risatti, P.I.M.E. (1993.01.20 – 2003.09.08)
  - Archbishop Luiz Soares Vieira (1984.04.25 – 1991.11.13)
  - Bishop José Maritano, P.I.M.E. (1980.10.30 – 1983.08.31)
- Prelates of Macapá (Roman rite)
  - Bishop José Maritano, P.I.M.E. (1965.12.29 – 1980.10.30)
  - Bishop Aristide Pirovano, P.I.M.E. (1955.07.21 – 1965.03.27)
  - Bishop Aristide Pirovano, P.I.M.E. (Apostolic Administrator 1950.01.14 – 1955.07.21)

== Sources ==
- GCatholic.org
- Catholic Hierarchy
