= Itaúna =

- Municipality
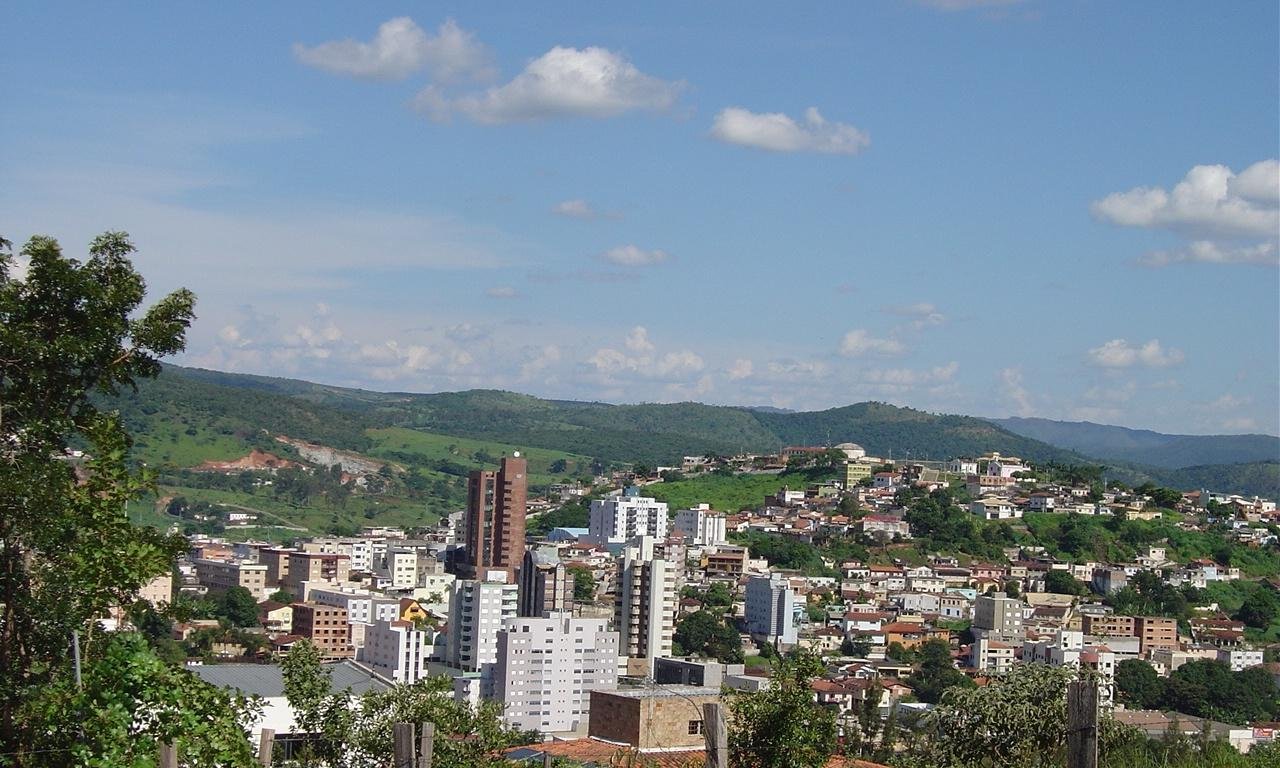
- Skyline of Itaúna

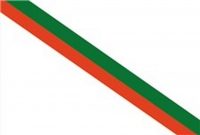
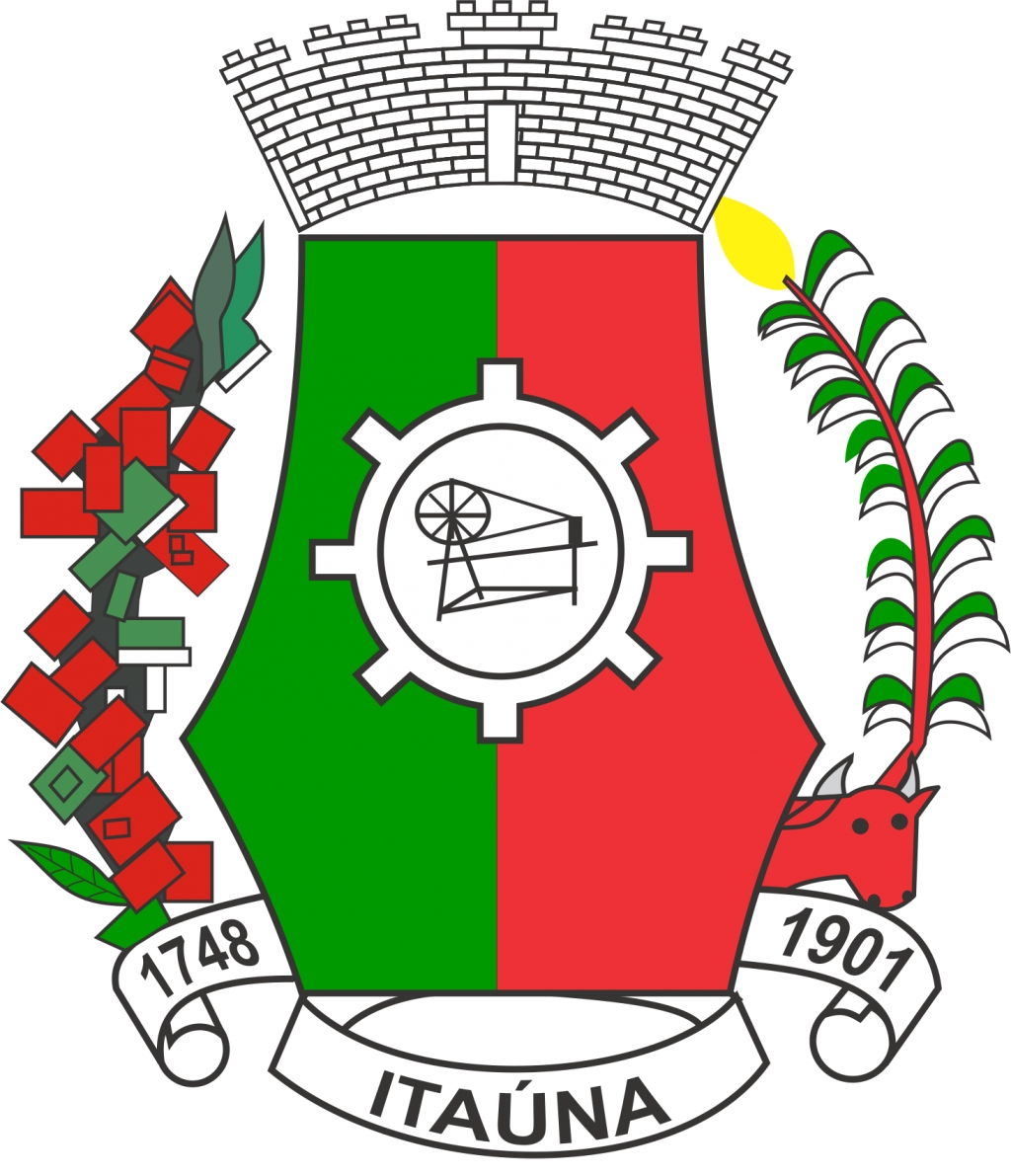
- Flag Coat of arms

- Location in Minas Gerais

- Location in Brazil
- Coordinates: 20°4′30″S 44°34′33″W
- Country: Brazil
- Region: Southeast
- State: Minas Gerais
- Incorporated (municipality): September 16, 1901

Government
  - Mayor: Gustavo Marques de Carvalho Mitre

Area
  - Total: 495.875 km^{2} (191.458 sq mi)
- Elevation: 880 m (2,890 ft)

Population (2022 Census)
  - Total: 97,139
  - Estimate (2025): 102,844
  - Density: 172.38/km^{2} (446.5/sq mi)
- Demonym: Itaunense
- Time zone: UTC−3 (BRT)
- CEP postal code: 35680-000
- Area code: 37
- HDI (2010): 0.758
- Website: itauna.mg.gov.br

Itaúna is a Brazilian municipality in the state of Minas Gerais. It is located in the Iron Quadrangle (Quadrilátero Ferrífero), within the Metropolitan Belt, 80 km from Belo Horizonte in the Central-West region of Minas. It borders Itatiaiuçu (Central Region of Minas) to the south, Mateus Leme (Greater Belo Horizonte) to the east, Carmo do Cajuru to the west, Pará de Minas (Central Region of Minas) to the north, and Igaratinga (Central-West Region) to the northwest. Its estimated population in 2025 is 102,844 inhabitants.

== Early Days: 17th and 18th Centuries ==
The history of Itaúna begins during the colonial period, when the bandeiras (expeditions) from São Paulo ventured into the Brazilian hinterlands. According to information from História de Itaúna by Miguel Augusto Gonçalves de Souza, the first white man to explore the region where Itaúna is located was Lourenço Castanho Taques. Unlike another bandeirante, Fernão Dias Pais Leme, he faced the Cataguases indigenous people in 1675 and set up a camp on the banks of the São João River, in what is now Itaguara. Lourenço was the son of Pedro Taques, a Portuguese man, and Ana de Proença, from São Paulo. He died in São Paulo in 1677. In 1710, after the War of the Emboabas, the bandeirante Manoel de Borba Gato, in one of his land grants (sesmarias), reached the São João Valley.

At this point, the histories of Bahia, Brazilian literature, and Itaúna intertwine. The Arcadian poem Caramuru tells the story of Diogo Álvares, known by the same name, and Catarina Paraguaçu. It is a fact that they had a daughter, Apolônia Álvares. Antônio Guedes de Brito, who served as interim governor of the province of Bahia in 1676, was a descendant of Apolônia. From 1652 to 1684, Brito purchased 160 leagues of land along the right bank of the São Francisco River, from Morro do Chapéu in Bahia to the mouth of the Pará River in present-day Minas Gerais, where Itaúna is now located. Souza states: "Antônio Guedes de Brito was, in chronological order, the third confirmed owner of the territory of the current municipality of Itaúna, preceded only by sesmeiro (land grantee) Captain-Major Brás Rocha Cardoso and the King of Portugal." Born in Bahia between 1626 and 1627, he died and was buried in Salvador between 1692 and 1695.

D. Isabel Maria Guedes de Brito, the daughter of Antônio Guedes de Brito, became the fourth chronological owner of the territory through inheritance. The previously mentioned land grant to Borba Gato made him the owner of these lands, as they were at some point considered "unclaimed." On September 24, 1739, a sesmaria charter was granted to Manoel Pinheiro Diniz, making him the sixth and final major landowner of the Itaúna region.

== Santana do São João Acima: 18th and 19th Centuries ==
There is some debate about who was the first settler of these lands. According to João Dornas Filho, the first resident of the municipality was Antônio Gonçalves da Guia. However, this claim was disputed by the late engineer and businessman from Itaúna, Osmário Soares Nogueira, who also studied the region's history and argued that the pioneering inhabitant was Manuel Pinto.

The controversy over the first settler of the region does not end with these two names. Guaracy de Castro Nogueira, a historian and genealogist from Itaúna and former rector of the University of Itaúna, claimed that the pioneer in the region was Sergeant-Major Gabriel da Silva Pereira, whose great-great-great-grandson, Osmando Pereira da Silva, later became the city's mayor. Manoel Pinto de Madureira, sometimes mistakenly recorded as Manoel Pinto Moreira, is described by Miguel Augusto Gonçalves de Souza as "undoubtedly the builder, in the broadest sense of the word, of the Chapel of Sant’Ana [now Rosário], and above all, its DONOR, the foundational core of the new settlement." The donation for the chapel’s construction was made on October 11 and recorded by the Archdiocese of Mariana on October 14, 1765, making Manoel Pinto de Madureira the unquestionable founder of the settlement of Santana do São João Acima.

With the imminent exhaustion of gold mines in the state, Minas Gerais began a shift in its economy. Only with the transition from mining to agriculture did the state regain significant economic progress. Santana do São João Acima had always been a region based on rural activities, despite Madureira’s attempts to find gold in the Jacuba Stream, a tributary of the left bank of the São João River. "Only in the last decade of the 19th century did the 'location of industries' begin to condition and guide urban growth, becoming, in fact, a predominant factor."

Livestock farming and mining were the main activities that drove settlement in the territory. In the early decades of the 19th century, mining was in clear decline, and agriculture, once limited to subsistence, began to gain more importance. During these 76 years, the settlement still belonged to Pitangui.

As mentioned earlier, Santana do São João Acima was religiously subordinate to Mariana. However, on April 3, 1839, Provincial Assembly Law No. 138 created the Parish of Espírito Santo de Itapecerica, in present-day Divinópolis, which was separated from Pitangui, and for two years, Santana remained under its jurisdiction. On April 7, 1841, the curato (religious district) of Santana was elevated to the category of Parish. With this establishment, migration flows, which had remained stable, began to increase. One example is the Gonçalves de Souza family itself, which settled there from Bonfim between the 1830s and 1840s. On December 23, 1874, after successive shifts of control with Pitangui, the settlement became a district under Pará de Minas, a status it maintained until full political emancipation. However, the settlement’s development was slow but steady and continuous. Some key dates and events from this period include:

- In 1850, the first primary school was created.
- According to the 1872 census, the population of the settlement was 4,259 inhabitants, of whom 1,718 were free men, 1,830 were free women, 341 were enslaved men, and 370 were enslaved women—meaning that 16.69% of the population was enslaved.
- On February 17, 1877, a visible sign of progress, a post office agency was inaugurated.

== Santana and Rosário: The two Chapels ==
Miguel Augusto writes: "A significant landmark of that time was the construction of a small chapel dedicated to Our Lady of the Rosary, built on the site where the current Matriz de Santana now stands—the most noble part of the city. This chapel was erected in the 1840s by enslaved people in their free time and was later expanded under the supervision of our first vicars: Antônio Maia, João da Cruz Penido, João Miranda, and Antônio Campos [who would later become the first vice-mayor of Itaúna], with broad collaboration from the region’s major landowners. The expansion was completed in 1875 with the completion of the interior paintings by artist Pedro Campos of Sabará, assisted by Antônio José dos Santos, better known as Tônio do Bá. The expansion of the Matriz, as João Dornas Filho tells us, cost the life of carpenter João Júlio César Silvino, who died while working on the church’s interior roofing, as recorded in the first book of deaths. This is likely the first recorded occupational accident in the city’s history."

"In 1853, the names of the two chapels were exchanged: the Rosário chapel became the Chapel of Santana, and the one located atop the hill of the same name—the initial landmark of the settlement’s foundation—became the Rosário Chapel."

To learn more about this name change, visit the page Igreja de Nossa Senhora do Rosário (Itaúna). The chapel underwent renovations in 1929.

== See also ==
- List of municipalities in Minas Gerais
