= Sérgio Eduardo Castriani =

Brazilian Roman Catholic bishop (1954–2021)

Sérgio Eduardo Castriani C.S.Sp.
- Archbishop of Manaus
- Church: Catholic Church
- Archdiocese: Archdiocese of Manaus
- In office: 12 December 2012 – 27 November 2019
- Predecessor: Luiz Soares Vieira
- Successor: Leonardo Ulrich Steiner
- Previous posts: Prelate of Tefé (2000-2012); Coadjutor Prelate of Tefé (1998-2000)

Orders
- Ordination: 9 December 1978
- Consecration: 9 August 1998 by Mário Clemente Neto

Personal details
- Born: 31 May 1954 Regente Feijó, São Paulo, United States of Brazil
- Died: 3 March 2021 (aged 66) Manaus, Amazonas, Brazil

Sérgio Eduardo Castriani C.S.Sp. (31 May 1954 – 3 March 2021) was a Brazilian Roman Catholic archbishop.

Castriani was born in Brazil and was ordained to the priesthood in 1978. He served as coadjutor bishop of the Roman Catholic Territorial Prelature of Tefé, Brazil, from 1998 to 2000 and was bishop of the territorial prefecture from 2000 to 2012. He then served as archbishop of the Roman Catholic Archdiocese of Manaus, Brazil, from 2012 to 2019.

Castriani died from sepsis complications on 3 March 2021.
