= Moacyr Grechi =

Brazilian Roman Catholic archbishop (1936–2019)

Moacyr Grechi OSM
- Archbishop of Porto Velho
- Church: Catholic Church
- Archdiocese: Archdiocese of Porto Velho
- In office: 29 July 1998 – 30 November 2011
- Predecessor: José Martins da Silva
- Successor: Esmeraldo Barreto de Farias
- Previous posts: Bishop of Rio Branco (1986-1998); Titular Bishop of Vegesela in Numidia (1973-1978); Prelate of Acre and Purus (1972-1986)

Orders
- Ordination: 29 June 1961
- Consecration: 21 October 1973 by João de Sousa Lima

Personal details
- Born: 19 January 1936 Araranguá, Santa Catarina, Republic of the United States of Brazil
- Died: 17 June 2019 (aged 83) Porto Velho, Rondônia, Brazil

Moacyr Grechi (19 January 1936 – 17 June 2019) was a Brazilian Roman Catholic archbishop.

== Career ==
Grechi was born in Brazil and was ordained to the priesthood in 1961. He served as bishop-prelate of the Territorial Prelature of Acre and Purus from 1972 to 1986. In 1986, the territorial prelature was elevated to the Roman Catholic Diocese of Rio Branco, Brazil, and Grechi served as the first bishop of the diocese from 1986 to 1998. He then served as the archbishop of the Roman Catholic Archdiocese of Porto Velho, Brazil, from 1998 to 2011.
