= Diocese of Marabá =

Catholic ecclesiastical territory

Diocese of Marabá Dioecesis Marabensis Diocese de Marabá

Location
- Country: Brazil
- Ecclesiastical province: Belém do Pará
- Metropolitan: Belém do Pará

Statistics
- Area: 81,832 km^{2} (31,596 sq mi)
- Population: Total; Catholics: (as of 2004); 533,000; 370,000 (69.4%)

Information
- Sui iuris church: Latin Church
- Rite: Roman Rite
- Established: 20 December 1969 (56 years ago)
- Cathedral: Cathedral of Our Lady of Perpetual Help in Marabá, Pará

Current leadership
- Pope: Leo XIV
- Bishop: Vital Corbellini
- Metropolitan Archbishop: Júlio Endi Akamine

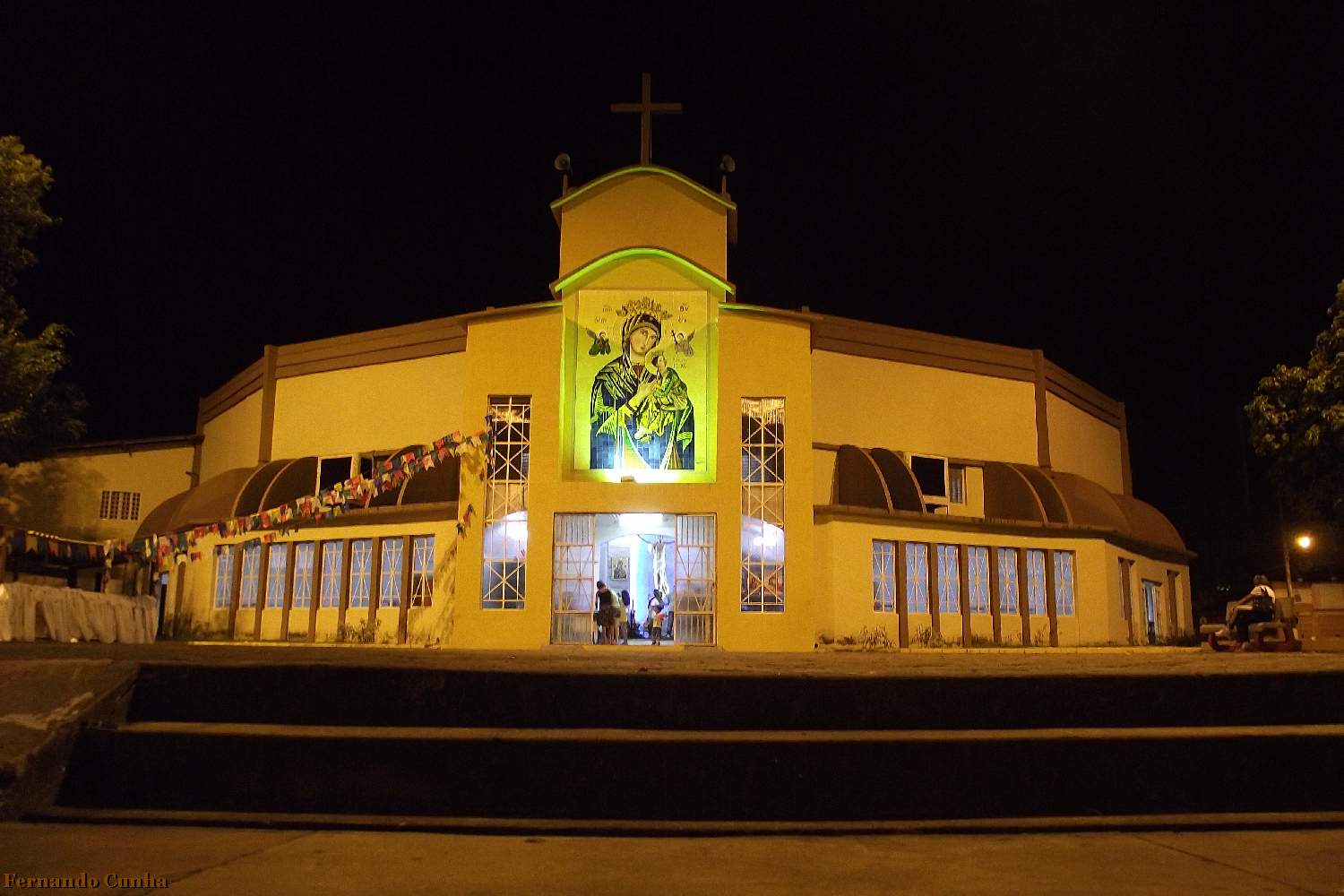
Cathedral of Our Lady of Perpetual Help. Marabá, Pará, Brazil.

The Diocese of Marabá (Latin: Dioecesis Marabensis) is a Latin Church ecclesiastic territory or diocese of the Catholic Church in Brazil. Its episcopal see is Marabá. The Diocese of Marabá is in the ecclesiastical province of the metropolitan Archdiocese of Belém do Pará.

== History ==
- December 20, 1969: Established as Territorial Prelature of Marabá from the Territorial Prelature of Santíssima Conceição do Araguaia
- October 16, 1979: Promoted as Diocese of Marabá

== Bishops ==
=== Ordinaries (in reverse chronological order) ===
- Bishops of Marabá
  - Bishop Vital Corbellini (2012.10.10 – )
  - Bishop José Foralosso, S.D.B. (2000.01.12 – 2012.04.25)
  - Bishop José Vieira de Lima, T.O.R. (1990.04.18 – 1998.11.11), appointed Bishop of São Luíz de Cáceres, Mato Grosso
  - Bishop Altamiro Rossato, C.SS.R. (1985.12.08 – 1989.03.15), appointed Coadjutor Archbishop of Porto Alegre, Rio Grande do Sul
  - Bishop Alano Maria Pena, O.P. (1979.10.16 – 1985.07.11), appointed Bishop of Itapeva, São Paulo; future Archbishop
- Prelates of Marabá
  - Bishop Alano Maria Pena, O.P. (1976.11.10 – 1979.10.16); future Archbishop
  - Bishop Luís António Palha Teixeira, O.P. (1969.12.20 – 1976.11.10)
- Prelates of Santíssima Conceição do Araguaia
  - Bishop Luís António Palha Teixeira, O.P. † (1951.02.20 - 1969.12.20)
  - Bishop Sebastião Thomás, O.P. (1924.12.18 - 1945.12.19)
  - Bishop Raymond Dominique Carrerot, O.P. † (1912.08.26 - 1920.07.30), appointed Bishop of Porto Nacional, Tocantins

=== Coadjutor prelates ===
- Tomás Balduino, O.P. (1967); did not succeed to see; appointed Bishop of Goiás
- Estêvão Cardoso de Avellar, O.P. (1971-1976); did not succeed to see; appointed Prelate of Santíssima Conceição do Araguaia, Para
- Alano Maria Pena, O.P. (1976-1985)

== Sources ==
- GCatholic.org
- Catholic Hierarchy
- Diocese website
