= Geraldo João Paulo Roger Verdier =

Roman Catholic bishop

- Bishop of Guajará-Mirim
- Church: Catholic Church
- Diocese: Diocese of Guajará-Mirim
- In office: 31 July 1980 – 8 December 2011
- Predecessor: Luiz Roberto Gomes de Arruda
- Successor: Benedito Araújo

Orders
- Ordination: 30 March 1963
- Consecration: 25 October 1980 by Carmine Rocco

Personal details
- Born: Gérald, Jean, Paul, Roger Verdier; 28 March 1937 Alban, Tarn, France
- Died: 22 October 2017 (aged 80) Porto Velho, Rondônia, Brazil

Geraldo João Paulo Roger Verdier (28 March 1937 – 22 October 2017) was a Roman Catholic bishop.

Verdier was ordained to the priesthood in 1963. He served as bishop of the Diocese of Guajará-Mirim, Brazil from 1980 to 2011.

== See also ==
- Catholic Church in Brazil
