= Diocese of Xingu-Altamira =

Catholic ecclesiastical territory

Diocese of Xingu-Altamira Dioecesis Xinguensis-Altamirensis

Location
- Country: Brazil
- Ecclesiastical province: Santarém

Statistics
- Area: 368,092 km^{2} (142,121 sq mi)
- Population: Total; Catholics: (as of 2013); 429,000; 330,000 (76.9%)

Information
- Rite: Latin Rite
- Established: 6 November 2019 (6 years ago)
- Cathedral: Cathedral of the Sacred Heart of Jesus in Altamira, Pará

Current leadership
- Pope: Leo XIV
- Bishop: Joao Muniz Alves, O.F.M.
- Metropolitan Archbishop: Irineu Roman
- Bishops emeritus: Erwin Kräutler, C.PP.S

Website
- Website of the Diocese

The Roman Catholic Diocese of Xingu-Altamira (Latin: Dioecesis Xinguensis-Altamirensis) is a Roman Catholic diocese located in the area of the Xingu River in the ecclesiastical province of Santarém in Brazil. The cathedral is located in Altamira, Brazil.

== History ==
On 16 August 1934, the Territorial Prelature of Xingu was established from the Metropolitan Archdiocese of Belém do Pará, Territorial Prelature of Santíssima Conceição do Araguaia and Territorial Prelature of Santarém.

At the time the Diocese of Santarém was promoted to an Archdiocese, the Territorial Prelature of Xingu was suppressed and succeeded by the Roman Catholic Diocese of Xingu-Altamira on 6 November 2019.

== Episcopal ordinaries ==
Territorial prelates (of Xingu)

- Clemente Geiger, C.PP.S (17 January 1948 – 26 April 1971)
- Eurico Kräutler, C.PP.S (26 April 1971 – 2 September 1981)
- Erwin Kräutler, C.PP.S (2 September 1981 – 23 December 2015)
  - Prelate Coadjutor (1980–1981)
- Joao Muniz Alves, OFM (23 December 2015 – 6 November 2019); see below

Bishops

- Joao Muniz Alves, OFM (6 November 2019 – present); see above
