= Territorial Prelature of Tefé =

Catholic particular church territory

Coordinates: 3.3500°S 64.7167°W

Territorial Prelature of Tefé Praelatura Territorialis Tefensis

Catholic

Location
- Country: Brazil
- Ecclesiastical province: Manaus

Statistics
- Area: 263,835 km^{2} (101,867 sq mi)
- Population: Total; Catholics: (as of 2004); 215,521; 161,640 (75%)

Information
- Rite: Latin Rite
- Established: 23 May 1910 (116 years ago)
- Cathedral: Catedral Prelatícia Santa Teresa

Current leadership
- Pope: Leo XIV
- Bishop: José Altevir da Silva, C.M.
- Metropolitan Archbishop: Leonardo Ulrich Steiner

The Territorial Prelature of Tefé (Latin: Praelatura Territorialis Tefensis) is a Roman Catholic territorial prelature located in the city of Tefé in the ecclesiastical province of Manaus in Brazil.

== History ==
- On 23 May 1910, the Apostolic Prefecture of Tefé was founded from the Diocese of Amazonas
- On 11 August 1950, the Prefecture was promoted to the Territorial Prelature of Tefé

== Bishops ==
- Prefects Apostolic of Tefé (Roman rite)
  - Fr. Miguel Alfredo Barat, C.S.Sp. (16 August 1910 – 1946)
  - Bishop Joaquim de Lange, C.S.Sp. (19 July 1946 – 18 April 1952) appointed Prelate of Tefé
- Prelates of Tefé (Roman rite)
  - Bishop Joaquim de Lange, C.S.Sp. (18 April 1952 – 15 December 1982)
  - Bishop Mário Clemente Neto, C.S.Sp. (15 December 1982 – 19 October 2000)
  - Bishop Sérgio Eduardo Castriani, C.S.Sp. (19 October 2000 – 12 December 2012)
  - Bishop Fernando Barbosa dos Santos, C.M. (14 May 2014 – 9 June 2021)
  - Bishop José Altevir da Silva, C.S.Sp. (9 March 2022 – present)

=== Coadjutor prelate ===
- Sérgio Eduardo Castriani, C.S.Sp. (1998–2000)
