= Archdiocese of Porto Velho =

Catholic ecclesiastical territory

Coordinates: 8°45′S 63°54′W

Archdiocese of Porto Velho Archidioecesis Portus Veteris

Catholic
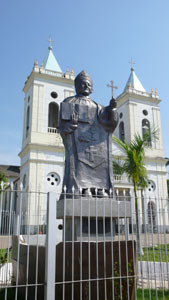
- Sacred Heart of Jesus Cathedral, Porto Velho

- Coat of arms

Location
- Country: Brazil

Statistics
- Area: 84,696 km^{2} (32,701 sq mi)
- Population: Total; Catholics: (as of 2000); 664,958; 598,000 (89.9%)

Information
- Rite: Latin Rite
- Established: 1 May 1925 (101 years ago)
- Cathedral: Catedral Metropolitana Sagrado Coração de Jesus

Current leadership
- Pope: Leo XIV
- Archbishop: Roque Paloschi

Website
- arquidiocesedeportovelho.org.br

The Roman Catholic Archdiocese of Porto Velho (Latin: Archidioecesis Portus Veteris) is an archdiocese located in the city of Porto Velho in Brazil.

== History ==
- 1 May 1925: Established as Territorial Prelature of Porto Velho from the Diocese of Amazonas and Diocese of São Luíz de Cáceres
- 16 October 1979: Promoted as Diocese of Porto Velho
- 4 October 1982: Promoted as Metropolitan Archdiocese of Porto Velho

== Bishops ==
=== Ordinaries, in reverse chronological order ===
- Archbishops of Porto Velho (Latin Rite), below
  - Roque Paloschi (2015.10.14 - )
  - Esmeraldo Barreto de Farias, Ist. del Prado (2011.11.30 - 2015.03.18), appointed Auxiliary Bishop of São Luís do Maranhão
  - Moacyr Grechi, O.S.M. (1998.07.29 – 2011.11.30)
  - José Martins da Silva, S.D.N. (1982.10.04 – 1997.09.03)
- Bishop of Porto Velho (Latin Rite), below
  - João Batista Costa, S.D.B. (see below 1979.10.16 – 1982.06.09)
- Prelates of Porto Velho (Latin Rite), below
  - João Batista Costa, S.D.B. (1946.10.01 – 1979.10.16 see above)
  - Pedro Massa, S.D.B. (Apostolic Administrator 1925.07.25 – 1946.10.01)

=== Coadjutor bishop ===
- Antônio Sarto, S.D.B. (1971-1982, including 1971-1979 as Coadjutor Prelate), did not succeed to see; appointed Bishop of Barra do Garças, Mato Grosso

=== Other priest of this diocese who became bishop ===
- Antônio Fontinele de Melo, appointed Bishop of Humaitá, Amazonas in 2020

== Suffragan dioceses ==
- Diocese of Cruzeiro do Sul
- Diocese of Guajará-Mirim
- Diocese of Humaitá
- Diocese of Ji-Paraná
- Diocese of Rio Branco
- Territorial Prelature of Lábrea

== Sources ==
- GCatholic.org
- Catholic Hierarchy
