= Territorial prelate =

High-ranking member of the Christian clergy

A territorial prelate is, in Catholic usage, a prelate whose geographic jurisdiction, called territorial prelature, generally does not belong to any diocese and is considered a particular church.

The term is also used in a generic sense, and may then equally refer to an apostolic prefecture, an apostolic vicariate, a permanent apostolic administration (which are pre-diocesan, often missionary, or temporary), or a territorial abbacy (see there).

== Status ==
A territorial prelate exercises quasi-episcopal jurisdiction in a territory separate from the territory of a diocese. In many cases the prelature is exempt from diocesan oversight and instead subject to the jurisdiction of the Holy See.

As a rule, territorial (and personal) prelates are consecrated as bishops, though not bishops of their diocese, as expressed by the title Bishop-prelate. Most were/are missionaries, outside Europe (mainly Latin America and a few Asian countries) or in countries with a Protestant majority (notably Lutheran Norway).

=== Prelate nullius ===
The territorial prelate is sometimes called a prelate nullius, from the Latin nullius diœceseos, prelate "of no diocese," meaning the territory falls directly under the 'exempt' jurisdiction of the Holy See or Pope (Bishop of Rome) and is not a diocese under a residing bishop.

The rights of prelates nullius are quasi-episcopal, and these dignitaries are supposed to have any power that a bishop has, unless it is expressly denied to them by canon law. If they have not received episcopal consecration, such prelates may not confer holy orders. If not consecrated episcopally, they have not the power to exercise those functions of consecrating oils, etc., which are referred to the episcopal order only analogously.

Prelates nullius may take cognizance of matrimonial causes within the same limits as a bishop. They may dispense from the proclamation of matrimonial banns, grant faculties for hearing confessions and preaching, reserve certain cases to themselves, publish indulgences and jubilees, exercise full jurisdiction over the enclosure of nuns, and invite any bishop to confirm in their quasi-diocese. They may, even if priests only, confirm themselves by papal privilege as expressed in canon 883 No. 1 CIC whenever they find it appropriate; however, even as local ordinaries they are in that case only extraordinary ministers of confirmation and should thus prefer to invite bishops if possible.

These prelates may not, however, without special permission of the Holy See, convoke a synod or institute synodal examiners. Neither may they confer parochial benefices. They are not allowed to grant indulgences, or absolve from the reserved cases and secret irregularities whose absolution is restricted to the pope ordinarily, but allowed to bishops by the Council of Trent, nor promote secular clerics to orders, nor grant dimissory letters for ordination, nor exercise jurisdiction over regulars as apostolic delegates.

Prelates nullius are, however, bound to residence, to preach the Word of God, to offer Mass for their people, to make the visit ad limina to the Roman Curia, and in concurrence with the neighbouring bishop to perform a visitation of their quasi-diocese.

== Current territorial prelatures ==
As of November 2022, there were 39, all Latin Church:

=== In Asia ===
- in the Philippines: Batanes-Babuyan (suffragan to the Archdiocese of Tuguegarao), Infanta, Isabela, Marawi

=== In Europe ===
- in Italy: Loreto, Pompei
- in France: Mission de France
- in Norway: Tromsø, Trondheim

=== In Latin America ===
- in Argentina: Cafayate, Deán Funes, Esquel, Humahuaca
- in Bolivia: Aiquile, Corocoro
- in Brazil: Itacoatiara, Itaituba, Lábrea, Marajó, São Félix, Tefé, Alto Xingu-Tucumã
- in Chile: Illapel
- in Guatemala: Santo Cristo de Esquípulas (United aeque principaliter, i.e. in personal union, with Diocese of Zacapa from 1986.06.24)
- in Mexico: El Salto, Huautla, Jesús María, Mixes
- in Panama: Bocas del Toro
- in Peru: Ayaviri, Caravelí, Chota, Chuquibamba, Chuquibambilla, Huamachuco, Juli, Moyobamba, and Yauyos. Established in 2019, the Territorial Prelature of Santiago Apóstol de Huancané is suffragan to the Archdiocese of Arequipa.

== Nominal territorial prelatures ==
(incomplete?)

- in Italy : Territorial Prelature of Santa Lucia del Mela, on Sicily, merged into the thus accordingly renamed Metropolitan Archdiocese of Messina–Lipari–Santa Lucia del Mela

== Former territorial prelatures ==
(probably quite incomplete; all Latin)

In Europe - Italy

- Territorial Prelature of Acquaviva delle Fonti (suppressed into Diocese of Altamura–Gravina–Acquaviva delle Fonti)
- Territorial Prelature of Altamura (promoted to Diocese of Altamura–Gravina–Acquaviva delle Fonti)

in Brazil

- Territorial Prelature of Abaeté do Tocantins (Brazil, now Diocese of Abaetetuba)
- Territorial Prelature of Acre and Purus (Brazil, now Diocese of Rio Branco)
- Territorial Prelature of Bananal (Brazil, suppressed)
- Territorial Prelature of Bom Jesus do Piauí (Brazil, renamed and promoted Diocese of Bom Jesus do Gurguéia)
- Borba (Brazil, promoted diocese)
- Territorial Prelature of Cristalândia (Brazil, promoted diocese)
- Territorial Prelature of Formosa (Brazil, promoted diocese)
- Territorial Prelature of Guiratinga (Brazil, promoted and renamed Diocese of Primavera do Leste–Paranatinga)
- Territorial Prelature of Paranatinga (Brazil, suppressed)
- Territorial Prelature of Porto Velho (Brazil, promoted twice: now Archdiocese)
- Territorial Prelature of Registro do Araguaia (Brazil, suppressed)
- Territorial Prelature of Rio Branco (Brazil, originally Acre and Purus, promoted Diocese of Rio Branco)
- Territorial Prelature of Roraima (Brazil, promoted diocese)
- Territorial Prelature of São Peregrino Laziosi no Alto Acre e Alto Purus (Brazil, originally Acre and Purus, promoted Diocese of Rio Branco)
- Territorial Prelature of São Raimundo Nonato (Brazil, promoted diocese)

in Spanish-speaking Latin America

- Territorial Prelature of Arica (Chile, promoted diocese)
- Territorial Prelature of Caacupé (Paraguay, promoted diocese)
- Territorial Prelature of Chimbote (Peru, promoted diocese)
- Territorial Prelature of Choluteca (Honduras, promoted diocese)
- Territorial Prelature of Chulucanas (Peru, promoted diocese)
- Territorial Prelature of Copiapó (Chile, promoted diocese)
- Territorial Prelature of Escuintla (Guatemala, promoted diocese)
- Territorial Prelature of Huarí (Peru, promoted diocese)
- Territorial Prelature of Huehuetenango (Guatemala, promoted diocese)
- Territorial Prelature of Madera (Mexico, promoted and renamed Diocese of Cuauhtémoc-Madera)
- Territorial Prelature of Río Magdalena (Colombia, promoted and renamed Diocese of Barrancabermeja)
- Territorial Prelature of San Fernando de Apure (Venezuela, promoted diocese)
- Sicuani, (Peru, promoted to diocese)
- Territorial Prelature of Tarma (Peru, promoted diocese)
- Territorial Prelature of Inmaculada Concepción de la B.V.M. en Olancho (Honduras, renamed and promoted Diocese of Juticalpa)

in Asia

- Territorial Prelature of Cotabato (Philippines, initially Territorial Prelature of Cotabato and Sulu; promoted diocese)
- Territorial Prelature of Kidapawan (Philippines, promoted diocese)
- Territorial Prelature of Marbel (Philippines, promoted diocese)

== See also ==
- Territorial Abbacy
- List of Catholic dioceses (alphabetical)
- List of Catholic dioceses (structured view)
- List of Catholic military dioceses
- List of Catholic apostolic administrations
- List of Catholic apostolic vicariates
- List of Catholic exarchates
- List of Catholic apostolic prefectures
- List of Catholic missions sui juris

== Sources and external links ==
- GCatholic
