= Third Order Regular of Saint Francis of Penance =

Franciscan mendicant order

Third Order Regular of St. Francis of Penance
- Tertius Ordo Regularis Sancti Francisci (Latin)
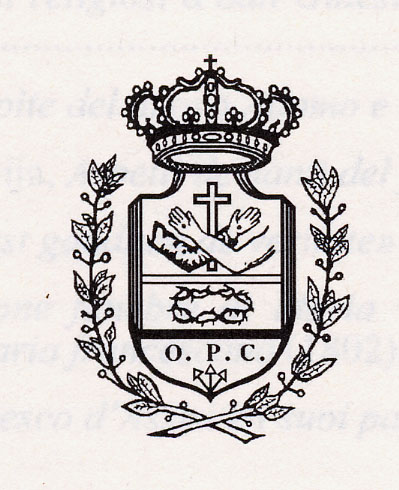
- Coat of arms of the Third Order Regular of St Francis
- Abbreviation: TOR (post-nominal letters)
- Formation: 1447; 579 years ago
- Founded at: Italy
- Type: Mendicant Order of Pontifical Right (for Men)
- Headquarters: Basilica Santi Cosma e Damiano, Via dei Fori Imperiali 1, 00186 Rome, Italy
- Coordinates: 41°54′4.9″N 12°27′38.2″E
- Region served: Worldwide
- Members: 820 members (573 priests) (2018)
- Minister General: Amando Trujillo Cano, TOR
- Parent organization: Third Order of Saint Francis
- Website: http://www.franciscanstor.org/
- Remarks: Ministry: educational, parochial, missionary works

The Third Order Regular of St. Francis of Penance, also known as Third Order Regular of St. Francis (Latin: Tertius Ordo Regularis Sancti Francisci) or TOR Franciscans, is a mendicant order of the Catholic Church, rooted in the Third Order of St. Francis, which was founded in 1221. The TOR congregation effectively became independent in 1447. It is part of the second branch of the third order, the Third Order Regular, who take religious vows and live in community. The members add the nominal letters TOR after their names to indicate their membership in the congregation.

== History ==
Various Third Order Regular Franciscan communities emerged after the founding of the Third Order of St. Francis in 1221. Unlike their Third Order Secular counterparts, the Third Order Regular lived in community and shared a religious charism. Their communities were isolated, and did not share a common leader. An apostolic letter from Pope Nicholas V in 1447, Pastoralis officii, effectively organized the more isolated communities into a new and separate religious order with its own rule of life, the Third Order Regular of Saint Francis of Penance.

=== Ireland ===
Secular tertiaries existed in Ireland as early as 1385. By 1441 brothers of the Third Order Regular were established at Clonfert, Killala and Tuam. In the fifteenth century there were about forty friaries of TOR Friars in Ireland, made up of small groups of clerical and lay brothers. The friars served the spiritual needs of the local people in their friaries and churches and in the surrounding parishes. They supported themselves by farming the nearby land. Each friary held a school. The friaries were abolished with the Reformation, yet a few individual friars remained, although clandestine.

The Franciscan Brothers of the Third Order Regular are noted for their having secretly taught the boys of the Catholic population of Ireland for decades in the underground "bog schools". The Order did not formerly re-emerge again in Ireland until the early 1800s at Merchant's Quay in Dublin with a group of secular tertiaries of the Friar Minor's church of Adam and Eve. They established a monastery and school at Milltown, Dublin in 1818, after the relaxation of the Penal Laws which had forbidden Catholic education. A second was opened at Dalkey.

In 1820 they transferred their monastery to Mountbellew in County Galway, where the Bellew family had invited them and had donated land and a house to get established. The Brothers ran a free primary school and specialized in trade schools for young men. The brothers at Mountbellew taught catechism, Gaelic, and established an agricultural school. In 1992 there were about fifty members.

In the course of the nineteenth century, Brothers from the Irish communities established foundations in the United States, which became independent Institutes in their own right. Franciscan Brothers Mountbellew, the Irish congregation of Brothers from which the friars of the T.O.R. sprang, has maintained a presence in the U.S. since the 1950s. In 1957, Brothers from Ireland began work in Catholic schools in the Archdiocese of Los Angeles. Originally working both in the Bronx, New York and California, they now serve only on the West Coast. As an Institute of Pontifical Right, they also work in Kenya and Uganda in education and agriculture.

==== Province of the Sacred Heart of Jesus ====
Prior to 1906, three separate and independent communities of men of the Third Order Regular existed in the United States. All of them were institutes of lay brothers dedicated to teaching and other works of charity. These were located in Brooklyn, New York (1858); Loretto, Pennsylvania (1847); and Spalding, Nebraska, which came about from a school founded for Native American boys (ca. 1882), at the request of Bishop John Ireland. The communities at Loretto and Brooklyn had been founded from Mountbellew Monastery, in Tuam, County Galway, Ireland, at the request of the bishops of Brooklyn and Pittsburgh, respectively. The community in Nebraska was a branch of the Brooklyn community.

As communities of lay Brothers, they were under the authority of their local bishops, who acted canonically as the superior general of the community within their diocese. The Brothers, however, came to desire a closer connection with the wider Franciscan Order. Additionally, due to the desire of some of the Brothers for ordination, as well as seeing a need to have the pastoral care of both the Brothers and their students coming from within their community, Brothers Raphael Brehenny, O.S.F., and his successor, Brother Linus Lynch, O.S.F., the superiors of the Brooklyn community, asked the bishop of that diocese for permission to have some of the members of that community ordained as priests.

The bishop refused this request, as the community had been introduced into the diocese for the care of parish schools, and the bishop feared that in the event of its members becoming priests this work would suffer. Thus, in May 1906, a petition was then sent to the minister general, Angelus de Mattia, asking for union with the friars of the Third Order Regular of St. Francis in Italy. The Bishop of Brooklyn, actively worked to block this effort, and it was halted.

In November 1906, the Spalding community made the same request to Angelo, the minister general in Rome. In their case, the local bishop was in accord with their desire and gave his authorization for such a merger. On December 8, the minister general, Angelo, signed a decree of union of the Spalding community with the Third Order Regular. In January 1907, he formally petitioned the Holy See to allow the establishment of a community of the Order in Nebraska, and to receive the vows of any qualified Brothers there. This was granted immediately, with the official approval and blessing of Pope Pius X being formally declared in November 1907. The Brothers were received into the Order by Stanislaus Dujmoric, of the Province of Dalmatia, who had been sent as the official delegate of the minister general to supervise the merger.

As their own union could not be effected, some of the Brooklyn Brothers determined to ask for a dispensation from their religious vows in order to join the friars in Nebraska. In the spring of 1907, several left New York and transferred to Spalding. The former superior, Bro. Raphael, appears to have been among them. That July, led by Bro. Linus, 23 Brothers also left Brooklyn and went to Spalding. At that point, the Nebraska community had increased from the initial size of six to thirty. Relying heavily upon the teaching experience of the New York Brothers, the community opened Spalding College in January 1908.

During that year of upheaval for the Brooklyn foundation, the diocesan community of Franciscan Brothers at Loretto—now in the new Diocese of Altoona—also sought incorporation with the Third Order Regular friars with the approval of their bishop, the Eugene A. Garvey. This was done on December 29, 1907. Permission for their admission received papal approval on May 22, 1908, and the union was achieved on May 28. To oversee this process, the minister general in Rome sent Jerome Zazzara, as his delegate, assisted by Anthony Balastieri. Brother Raphael and three other Brothers came from Spalding to help in the process.

At the request of Bishop Garvey, who was struggling to meet the needs of Italian-speaking Catholics, Jerome accepted charge of the Church of St. Anthony of Padua at Johnstown, Pennsylvania, in November 1909 as a permanent ministry of the friars, appointing his fellow Italian, Anthony, as pastor. With the establishment of a small community of friars in that parish, there now existed three separate communities in the United States, the minimum canonically required for an independent province. In December, Jerome also accepted the Church of Our Lady of Mount Carmel, Altoona, Pennsylvania, and took on the office of pastor himself.

The four houses in the United States were erected into a province, 24 September 1910, under the title of the Province of the Most Sacred Heart of Jesus. Jerome was appointed as the first minister provincial. The Archbishop of Chicago later gave the friars charge of Sts. Peter and Paul Slavic Church in that city, and a new college was to be opened at Sioux City, Iowa, in 1912. At that point, the American Province had five friaries, two colleges, 65 professed members, and 20 novices and postulants. Raphael Breheny, original superior of the Brooklyn Brothers, was elected the first native minister provincial in 1913. The provincial motherhouse is at St. Francis University, Loretto, Pennsylvania.

==== Province of the Immaculate Conception ====
The other province, Immaculate Conception, has its headquarters at St. Bernardine Monastery in Hollidaysburg, Pennsylvania. This province came about as the result of a dispute over the eligibility of the Italian friars to vote in the Provincial Chapter of 1918. The Minister General was unable to oversee the proceedings due to the hostilities between the United States and Italy during World War I. He thus appointed an American friar as his delegate, who oversaw that chapter. This friar declared that the foreign friars still belonged to their Italian provinces and thus were ineligible to vote in the chapter. These friars, along with some Americans, refused to accept the election of a new Minister Provincial which took place. This resulted in the newly elected minister provincial and the then-current one both claiming the office.

The matter was referred to the Sacred Congregation in Rome. That office declared that, for the sake of peace, a new chapter should be held under the presidency of a friar from another province, and that the Italian friars should declare their intention to transfer formally from their original Provinces. That chapter, held in 1919, resulted in the same results as the previous one. By that time, however, discontent among the Italian friars and others was so deep that the Italian friars and their supporters petitioned to form a separate Commissariat (a semi-autonomous division in the Order). This was approved in 1920, and the new Commissariat numbered thirteen friars—five Italians and eight Americans. Zazzara was appointed Commissary Provincial.

Five years later, the Dalmatian friar, Dujmoric, who had supervised the union of the Spalding community into the order was now minister general. He raised the commissariat to the status of a province. Zazzara was elected the first minister provincial. The province still staffs the two original parishes in Pennsylvania, as well as two in Minnesota. It also runs retreat centers in Orlando, Florida and West Virginia. The current minister provincial (2010) is J. Patrick Quinn.

In 1920, the Province divided and the Province of the Immaculate Conception were established. Friars from the Spanish Province were invited to the United States to work with the Spanish-speaking populations of Texas and New York.

A number of the brothers in Brooklyn also sought to join the congregation in Italy, but were denied permission by the local bishop, who was concerned that he might lose their services as teachers. The Brooklyn foundation became the Franciscan Brothers of Brooklyn.

In 1938, American friars were sent to establish the order's first foreign missions in Bhagalpur, India, and later a mission was founded in Paraguay.

=== Philippines ===
Towards the end of the 1980s the TOR Province of Assisi, Italy, promoted vocations in the Philippines. Four young men replied to the invitation. Out of the four, two became priests, Dante Anhao and Milestone Japin. Dante Anhao (still a deacon at that time) together with Carlo Stradaioli and Marcello Fadda, came to the Philippines in 1997. They were welcomed by Bishop Emilio Bataclan, the Ordinary of the Diocese of Iligan. This was the beginning of the TOR Philippine Mission under the Assisi Province.

The small community of three friars has grown in number as some young men came and received formation. Nilo Laput, a diocesan priest, who stayed with a local Franciscan community in Labason, Zamboanga del Norte, through the invitation of former Minister General, Bonaventure Midili, came to join the new community in 1999. He received his novitiate formation in Assisi, Italy. Alvin Galicia, a former member of Laput’s community in Labason, came later and also did his novitiate formation in Italy.

At first the friars and their candidates lived in two semi-concrete houses before the establishment of a permanent friary and formation house in 2005. By this time, the temporary professed friars studied theology at St. John Vianney Theological Seminary (SJVTS) in Cagayan de Oro, a city about eighty kilometers from Iligan. In 2007, George Mailadil, a friar from Ranchi Province, India, came to help in the formation of the friars in theology in Cagayan de Oro.

In 2009, with the support of George Mailadil, it was decided that the theological studies of the Junior Friars will be transferred from Saint John Vianney Theological Seminary (SJVTS) to St. Alphonsus Theological and Mission Institute (SATMI) in Davao City. Davao City is around 4,000 kilometers away from Iligan or Cagayan de Oro. At first, they were renting a house in the city while a simple house was constructed in a two-hectare land in Indangan.

On January 6, 2012, the small TOR Philippine Mission was raised to the status of a Delegation, placing them directly under the TOR Generalate in Rome in terms of administration and decisions. The statutes of the new delegation was drafted and was approved by the General Minister on March 20, 2012. The name of the new delegation is The Delegation of Saints Cosmas and Damian.
