= Walter Ivan de Azevedo =

Brazilian Roman Catholic bishop (1926–2024)

His Excellency Walter Ivan de Azevedo S.D.B.
- Bishop Emeritus of São Gabriel da Cachoeira
- Metropolis: Manaus
- Installed: 27 February 1988
- Term ended: 23 January 2002
- Predecessor: Michele Alagna Foderá
- Successor: José Song Sui-Wan
- Previous post: Coadjutor Bishop of São Gabriel da Cachoeira (1986–1988)

Orders
- Ordination: 8 December 1953
- Consecration: 27 July 1986 by Paulo Evaristo Arns

Personal details
- Born: 8 May 1926 São Paulo, Brazil
- Died: 28 January 2024 (aged 97) Manaus, Amazonas, Brazil
- Motto: In novitate spiritus

Walter Ivan de Azevedo (8 May 1926 – 28 January 2024) was a Brazilian Roman Catholic prelate. He was bishop of São Gabriel da Cachoeira from 1988 to 2002. Azevedo died on 28 January 2024, at the age of 97.

Catholic Church titles
Preceded by Michele Alagna Foderá	Bishop of São Gabriel da Cachoeira; 1988–2002	Succeeded by José Song Sui-Wan
