= Amazonas (Brazilian state) =

State of Brazil

- State
- Flag Coat of arms
- Motto: Iustitia et Aequalitas (Latin) "Justice and Equality"
- Anthem: Hino do estado do Amazonas
- Location in Brazil
- Coordinates: 5°S 63°W
- Country: Brazil
- Region: North
- Capital and largest city: Manaus

Government
  - Type: Federal state
  - Governor: Roberto Cidade (UNIÃO)
  - Vice Governor: Serafim Corrêa (PSB)
  - Senators: Eduardo Braga (MDB); Omar Aziz (PSD); Plínio Valério (PSDB)
  - Legislature: Legislative Assembly of Amazonas

Area
  - Total: 1,570,745.7 km^{2} (606,468.3 sq mi)
  - Rank: 1st
- Highest elevation (Pico da Neblina): 2,995 m (9,827 ft)

Population (2025)
  - Total: 4,321,616
  - Rank: 13th
  - Density: 2.751315/km^{2} (7.125873/sq mi)
  - Rank: 26th
- Demonym: Amazonense

GDP (2024)
  - Total: R$177.231 billion (US$32.888 billion)

HDI
  - Year: 2024
  - Category: 0.767 – high (17th)

Time zones
- Western: UTC−05:00 (BRT–2)
- Remaining: UTC−04:00 (BRT–1)
- Postal Code: 69000-000 to 69290-000; 69400-000 to 69890-000
- ISO 3166 code: BR-AM
- Website: www.amazonas.am.gov.br

Amazonas (/ˌæməˈzoʊnəs/, AM-ə-ZOHN-əs; pronounced [amaˈzõnɐs]) is a state of Brazil, located in the North Region in the north-western corner of the country. It is the largest Brazilian state by area and the ninth-largest country subdivision in the world with an area of 1,570,745.7 square kilometers. It is the largest country subdivision in South America, being greater than the areas of Chile, Paraguay, and Uruguay combined. Neighbouring states are (from the north clockwise) Roraima, Pará, Mato Grosso, Rondônia, and Acre. It also borders the nations of Peru, Colombia and Venezuela. This includes the Departments of Amazonas, Vaupés and Guainía in Colombia, as well as the Amazonas state in Venezuela, and the Loreto Region in Peru.

Amazonas is named after the Amazon River, and was formerly part of the Spanish Empire's Viceroyalty of Peru, a region called Spanish Guyana. It was settled by the Portuguese moving northwest from Brazil in the early 18th century and incorporated into the Portuguese Empire after the Treaty of Madrid in 1750. It became a state under the First Brazilian Republic in 1889.

Most of the state is tropical jungle; cities are clustered along navigable waterways and are accessible only by boat or plane. It is divided into 62 municipalities and the capital and largest city is Manaus, a modern city of 2.1 million inhabitants in the middle of the jungle on the Amazon River, 1,500 km upstream from the Atlantic Ocean. Nearly half the state's population lives in the city; the other large cities, Parintins, Manacapuru, Itacoatiara, Tefé, and Coari are also along the Amazon River in the eastern half of the state.

== Etymology ==
The name was originally given to the Amazon River that runs through the state by the Spaniard Francisco de Orellana in 1541. Claiming that he came across a warlike tribe of indigenous people of whom the women fought alongside the men, de Orellana likened them to the Amazons of Greek mythology, and hence named the river Río de las Amazonas.

== History ==
=== Administrative evolution ===
Flag of Amazonas State
- Adopted: January 14, 1982
- Design: 25 stars for municipalities of August 4, 1897, the larger one for the capital Manaus. Two white bars for hope, red bar for struggles overcome.

Amazonas was originally the captaincy of São Jose do Rio Negro, then a District of Grão-Pará, which became a province and finally a state of Brazil.

- 1616 – Captaincy of Maranhão begins westward expansion
- 1751 – Maranhão reconstituted as state of Grão-Pará e Maranhão
- 1755 – Captaincy of Rio Negro split off
- 1757 – Captaincy of Rio Negro rejoined
- 1772 – Grão-Pará e Rio Negro split from Grão-Pará e Maranhão.
- 1775 – Captaincy of Grão-Pará of state of Brazil.
- 1821 – Province of Pará
- 1822 – Pará province of independent Brazil.
- 1832 – Creation of Judicial District of the Upper Amazonas, under Pará.
- 1850 – Province of Amazonas split from Pará
- 1889 – State of Amazonas

Capital

- 1755 – Village of São José do Javari; it became the vila Maryua
- 1758 – Maryua is elevated to a town and called Barcelos
- 1788–1799 – Capital moved to Barra do Rio Negro;
- 1799–1808 – The capital was again in Barcelos
- 1808 – Barra do Rio Negro the capital, renamed Manaus in 1832

=== Rise of the rainforest ===
At one time the Amazon River flowed westward, perhaps as part of a proto-Congo (Zaïre) river system from the interior of present-day Africa when the continents were joined as part of western Gondwana. Fifteen million years ago, the Andes were formed by the collision of the South American Plate with the Nazca Plate (eastern Pacific oceanic) plate. The rise of the Andes and the linkage of the Brazilian and Guyana bedrock shields, blocked the river and caused the Amazon to become a vast inland sea. Gradually this inland sea became a massive swampy, freshwater lake and the marine inhabitants adapted to life in freshwater. For example, over 20 species of stingray, most closely related to those found in the Pacific Ocean, can be found today in the fresh waters of the Amazon.

About ten million years ago, waters worked through the sandstone to the west and the Amazon began to flow eastward. At this time the Amazon rainforest was born. During the Ice Age, sea levels dropped and the great Amazon lake rapidly drained and became a river. Three million years later, the ocean level receded enough to expose the Central American isthmus and allow mass migration of mammal species between the Americas.

The Ice Ages caused tropical rainforest around the world to retreat. Although debated, it is believed that much of the Amazon reverted to savanna and montane forest. Savanna divided patches of rainforest into "islands" and separated existing species for periods long enough to allow genetic differentiation. A similar rainforest retreat took place in Africa, where Delta core samples suggest that even the mighty Congo watershed was void of rainforest at this time. When the ice ages ended, the forest was again joined, and the species that were once one, had diverged significantly enough to be designated as separate species, adding to the tremendous diversity of the region. About 6,000 years ago, sea levels rose about 130 meters, once again causing the river to be inundated like a long, giant freshwater lake.

=== Native peoples ===
The pre-Columbian Amazonas was inhabited by seminomadic peoples whose livelihood mixed occasional agriculture with a fishing and hunter-gatherer lifestyle. Because of Christopher Columbus' misunderstanding of the continent at which he had arrived, the native population were and are denominated "índios" by the Portuguese. Approximately two thousand Indian tribes lived in the region in the sixteenth century, perhaps amounting to some millions of people, but phenomena such as disease and assimilation to Brazilian culture caused their numbers to fall to approximately three hundred thousand, and two hundred tribes, by the end of the twentieth century. Certain uncontacted tribes still exist in the region.

=== Colonial conflicts ===
In the colonial time, the territory which today belongs to the State of Amazonas, was a combination of treaties, expeditions, evangelism and military occupations. Scarce but recorded claims and indigenous uprisings in the region, were initially made by the Spanish Empire through the Treaty of Tordesillas and after the Portuguese Empire by the First Treaty of San Ildefonso. The State also includes territory from failed attempts at colonization by the European powers, such as England and the Dutch empire.

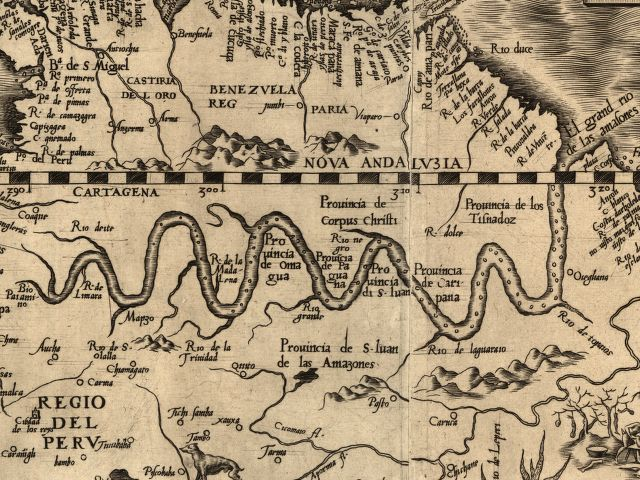
1562 map of the Amazon River Region

The first Spanish expedition was by Francisco de Orellana in conjunction with Catholic priest Gaspar de Carvajal, who documented the expedition. He reported a conflict against indigenous women which led to the current name of the river, and then to the current name of the region and the state (Amazonas in English: Amazons). The second Spanish expedition was by Pedro de Ursúa, intending to prove the previous expedition, but resulted in the Spanish Kingdom dropping the attempt to colonize the region.

After the unification of the Iberian kingdoms, Portugal launched an expedition on the river [but in reverse from Francisco de Orellana, at the mouth of the river to the site of the present-day city of Quito, capital of Ecuador], with the intention of attaching Spanish lands (comprising the current territory of the Brazilian Amazon) to the Portuguese Kingdom. After the dissolution of the Iberian Union, Portuguese and Spanish possessions in the region were undefined, resulting in internal conflicts in the region between Portugal and Spain. The Portuguese Crown later asserted the principle of uti possidetis, with respect to the region. This was the first assertion of the principle from Roman law of uti possidetis, ita possideatis, (Latin, "who has possession, has dominion"), analogous to English common law "Squatters rights". Due account may have been taken of John Locke's labour theory of property.

Conflicting issues arose between what was granted by law in the Treaty of Tordesillas (1494), and the subsequent reality of colonial expansion: the Spanish, eastward from the Pacific coastal plains (though restrained by the Andes), and the Portuguese, westward (aided by the waterways and lowlands of the mighty Amazon). The Treaty of Madrid (13 January 1750) – that determined the border between the Spanish possessions and southern Portuguese Brazil – had first enunciated the principle that new states, at the time of their creation shall have dominion over the lands that were settled as colonies. It implicitly opened the door to claims by prior possession in the vast lands of the north.

After the independence of Brazil in 1822, the current borders of the Amazonas State were still undefined – at that time being with Gran Colombia. The internal conflicts within that neighbour country resulted in the emergence of Colombia, Ecuador, Venezuela and Panama. Brazil signed the Treaty Vásquez Cobo–Martins (1908) (with those countries) finally entitling those possessions in the north to Brazil. One region is marked by the geodesic line Apóporis-Tabatinga; and the other is the municipal area of São Gabriel da Cachoeira, on the Brazil-Colombia border.

=== Spanish conquistadors and Jesuits ===
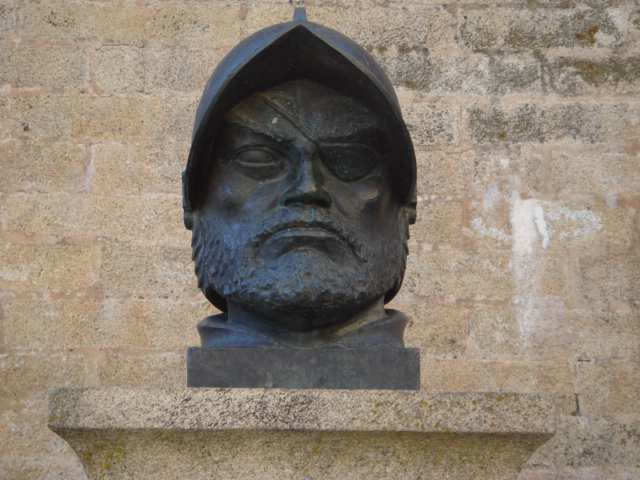
Bust of Francisco de Orellana, explorer who visited the Amazon River

By the Treaty of Tordesillas (1494), the whole Amazon basin was in the area of the Spanish Crown. The mouth of a great river was explored by Spanish conquistador Vicente Yáñez Pinzón, who reached it in February 1500, with his cousin Diego de Lepe. He called the river Río Santa María de la Mar Dulce (River of Saint Mary of the Sweet Sea) on account of the large freshwater estuary extending into the sea at its mouth.

In 1541, Spanish conquistadores Gonzalo Pizarro and Francisco de Orellana, from Quito, Ecuador, crossed the Andes Mountains and explored the course of the river to the Atlantic Ocean. The indigenous people called this river the Conoris. (Note: The river the English language calls the Amazon has three names in Spanish and Portuguese: the Amazonas applies only from the estuary to the junction with the Rio Negro Thereafter the river becomes the Solimões until it enters Peru, where it is called the Maranon) The myth of women warriors on the river has spread in the accounts and books, without any popular scope, still making those regions to receive names of warriors of Greek mythology, the Amazons — among them the largest river in the region that became known as the Amazon River. Early publications, as was the style of the day, called the river after its European explorer, the Orellana.

Also in the 16th century, there were the expeditions of conquistadores Pedro de Ursúa and Lope de Aguirre in search of the legendary El Dorado, the Lost City of Gold (1559–1561) Spanish Jesuit missions were the first settlements upstream on the Amazon. As many as 30 missions were founded in Amazon territory, seven in Brazil, between 1638 and 1727. (Note: Including San Ignacio) The municipality of Silves on an island of Lake Saracá is one of the oldest in the Amazon, originating in a Mercedarian Indian mission founded in 1663. By the early 18th century, they were destroyed by the Portuguese, depopulated by smallpox, or their indigenous residents taken away as slaves by Portuguese Bandeirantes. A few were taken over by Portuguese Carmelites. The destruction of the missions was the end of Spanish claims in western Amazonia. Only one is a populated place today, San Pablo, now the municipality of São Paulo de Olivença.

=== English, Dutch and French outposts ===
Starting about 1580, without effective occupation, English, Dutch, French (and even some Irish) searching for so-called drogas do sertão (spices of the backlands (Note: including cacao, sarsaparilla, urucu(annalto), cloves, cinnamon, anil, seeds, puxuri, vanilla)) had established some outposts upstream of the mouth of the Amazon.

=== Portuguese usurpation ===
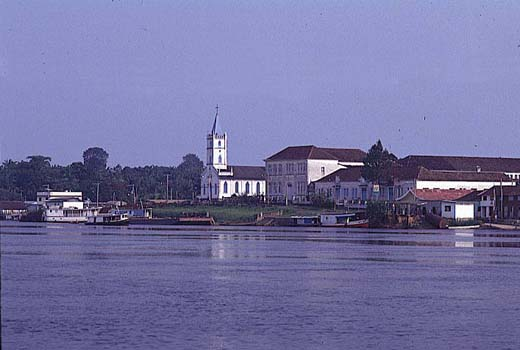
Barcelos was first headquarters of the captaincy of São José do Rio Negro.

From at least the time of the Tordesillas Treaty in 1494 (Note: the treaty line passed north-south through the coastal border of Maranhão/Pará in the north to a little south of São Paulo in the south.) until the Treaty of Madrid in 1750, the region of the upper Amazon was part of the Spanish Viceroyalty of Peru (Viceroyalty of New Granada after 1717). Everything north of the Amazon (Solimões) and west of the Nhamundá River (Yamundá, in Spanish), an affluent of the left bank of the Amazon that forms the boundary of Amazonas with Pará, was known as Spanish Guyana.

Portuguese expansion westward and northward of the Tordesillas Line began from the frontier of the northernmost captaincy of Maranhão with the expulsion of the French from São Luis in 1615, and the founding of Belém at the mouth of the Amazon in 1616. Exploration and colonization thence followed the waterway upstream.

There are accounts of Portuguese Carmelite missionaries active in the Solimões area, upstream of the Rio Negro, as early as the 1620s, but permanent settlements weren't established for another 80 years, so the records are nebulous. The first documented Portuguese foray into upper Amazonia was the expedition of Portuguese explorer and military officer Pedro Teixeira, who followed the great river from the Atlantic Ocean to Quito, Ecuador with 70 soldiers and 1,200 Indians in forty-seven great canoes (1637–1639). He returned by the same route, arriving back in Belém in 1639. According to the Portuguese, Pedro Teixeira placed a possession marker at the upper Japurá River in 1639. Soon after that the Portuguese bandeirante António Raposo Tavares, whose bandeira, leaving the captaincy of São Vicente travelling overland, reached the Andes, and following the Amazon River, returned to Belém, visiting a total of about 12,000 kilometres (7,500 mi), between 1648 and 1651.

Tropical jungle is hostile and impenetrable as well as European settlements were exclusively along the waterways. Portuguese expansion generally was east to west, and from the main channel, the Solimões, north and south along the tributaries. The character of the settlements was of three kinds: defense and occupation (fortes), economic (feitorias), and evangelical (missões). The first permanent Portuguese settlements in the region were Itacoatiara 176 km east of Manaus, founded in 1655 by Portuguese Jesuit Padre António Vieira as Mission of Aroaquis on the island of Aibi near the mouth of Lake Arauató, followed by São Gabriel, founded in 1668 as by Franciscan Friar Teodózio [or Teodósio] da Veiga and Captain Pedro da Costa Favela on the Rio Negro, near the mouth of the Rio Aruím. In 1761, a fort was built on the location, and the settlement became the town of São Gabriel da Cachoeira. The first missionary aldea of the Portuguese in the Negro was that known as Santo Elias dos Tarumas (originally aldeia of Nossa Senhora da Conceição, and later called Airão), dating from 1692. the capital Manaus, was founded in 1669 as the Fort of São José do Rio Negro (later called Lugar da Barra do Rio Negro or "place on the shore of Rio Negro") on the confluence of the Rio Negro and Solimões Rivers.

The Royal Charter of 1693 divided Amazonia among the Jesuits, Carmelites, Capuchines and Franciscans: the Jesuits restricted their activities to the south bank of the Amazon upstream to the mouth of the Madeira; the north shore of the Amazon as far as the Trombetas fell to the Franciscans, to the mouth of the Rio Negro to the Mercedarians, and the Negro itself and the Solimoes to the Carmelites. The Portuguese Carmelites got a later start than the Spanish Jesuits, but their impact was more durable. Between 1697 and 1757, they established eight missions on the Solimões and nine on the Rio Negro. (Note: On the Solimões, they were Coari, Tefe, Manerua, Paraguari, Turucuatuba, São Paulo, and Sao Pedro; on the Rio Negro, they were Jau, Caragai, Aracari, Comaru, Mariua, Sao Caetano, Cabuquena, Baratua, and Dari) In addition, there were a few Portuguese Jesuit missions in the Solimões. In 1731, Portuguese Jesuits received orders from the Governor Luiz de Vasconcellos Lobo to establish two aldeias above the mouth of the Rio Negro, one on the right bank of the Orellana Solimões, between the eastern mouth of the Javari and the Carmelite aldeia of São Pedro; the other at the western mouth of the great river Japurá. This was the beginning of what came to be called the Jesuit–Carmelite War.

Antidote to settlement was disease: fierce smallpox epidemics in 1661, 1695, 1724, and 1743/49 left the region nearly depopulated. A Carmelite Friar had notable success with the method of variolation in 1729, but the technique was not propagated. The Jenner cowpox vaccine was not introduced in Brazil until 1808. Variolation was prohibited in 1840, and vaccination was mandated in 1854. But epidemics got worse until finally petering out around the turn of the century.

Within the project of occupying the Amazon hinterland, was formed the royal captaincy of São José do Rio Negro subordinate to Para, in Mar. 1755, with headquarters in the village of Mariuá, (now Barcelos).

==== The borders of Brazil ====
The boundary between the Portuguese and Spanish domination of the Amazon was eventually fixed at the Rio Javari (river that rises on the border between Amazonas state, Brazil, and Loreto department, Peru) by the Treaty of Madrid in 1750.

By the mid-18th century, the effective boundary between the two empires, the Spanish Viceroyalty of Peru and Portuguese Brazil, had shifted to the area of the confluence of the Rio Negro and Amazon Rivers, in upper Amazonia. While the Treaty of Madrid in 1750 implicitly recognized the principle of uti possiditis, it did not actually specify the northern borders of the country. At that time, the border of contention between Spanish and Portuguese domains was in the upper Solimões, at the junction of the Rio Negro. In the upper Salomoes, Spanish missionary influence was being displaced, and the Viceroy was indifferent to colonization, but Portuguese settlements were not yet established. Part of the northern boundary between Brazil and what was then British Guyana, was set by the Spanish Boundary-line Commission of Yturriaga and Solano (1757–1763). After two indecisive wars between Portuguese and Spanish colonial forces 1761–1763 and 1776–1777, the border between the Spanish and Portuguese possessions, the Viceroyalty of Peru (and successor states) and Grão-Pará region of Brazil, was set between 1781 and 1791 by negotiation.

=== Age of rebellion ===
In 1821, Grão-Pará and Rio Negro provinces became the unified Grão-Pará. The following year, Brazil proclaimed its independence and Grão-Pará became the province of Pará of state of Brazil.

When Emperor Pedro I declared independence from Portugal, in 1822, he had to fight also the provinces of Grão-Pará and Maranhão. In 1823, a ship commanded by British officer John Pascoe Grenfell arrived at the port of Belém, to combat rebels. Only in August 1824 did the new governor swear loyalty to the Brazilian Emperor. The Province of Pará, including the comarca of Rio Negro, the upper Amazon region, was incorporated into the Empire of Brazil in 1824.

A revolt in 1832 demanded the autonomy of the Amazonas region as a separate province of Pará. The rebellion was suppressed, but the Amazons were able to send a representative to the Imperial Court, Friar José dos Santos Inocentes, who got up the creation of the District of the Upper Amazon. During Cabanagem in 1835–40, the Amazon remained loyal to the imperial government and not joined the revolt.

As a sort of reward for loyalty, the Province of Amazonas was officially created by Emperor Pedro II in 1850.

=== Rubber and economic exploitation ===
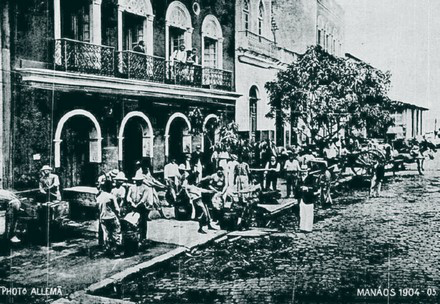
Rubber market in the centre of Manaus in 1904

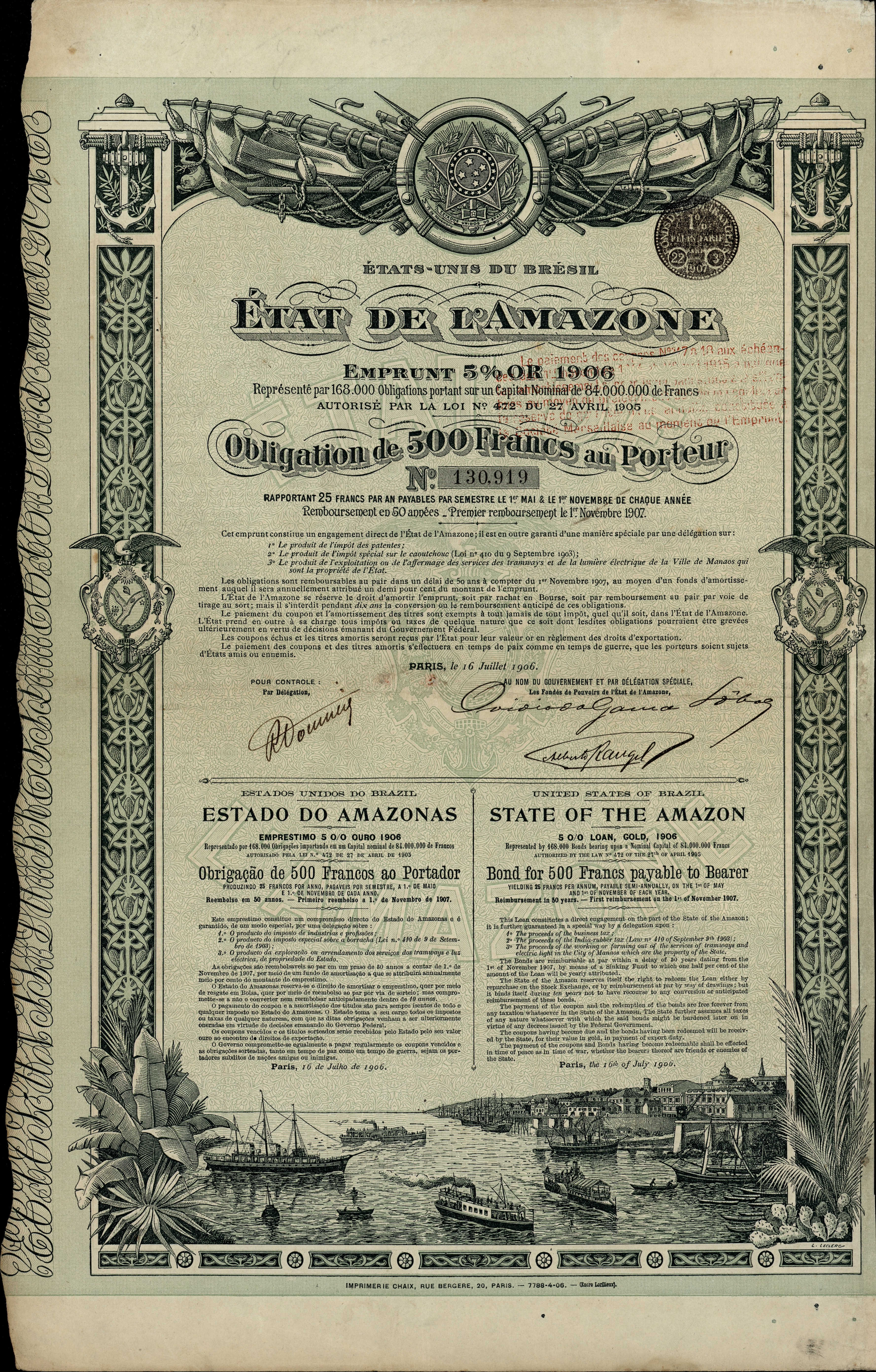
Bond of the State of the Amazonas, issued 16. July 1906

From the mid-19th century, the territory began to receive migrants from the northeast seeking a better life. Attracted by the rubber boom, they settled in important Amazonian cities such as Manaus, Tabatinga, Parintins, Itacoatiara and Barcelos, the first capital of Amazonas. The state had an era of splendor in the 1890s, at the peak of the rubber boom. However, the economic gains were largely the result of great human suffering: untold thousands of enslaved Amerindian seringueiros (rubber tappers) died through disease and overwork.

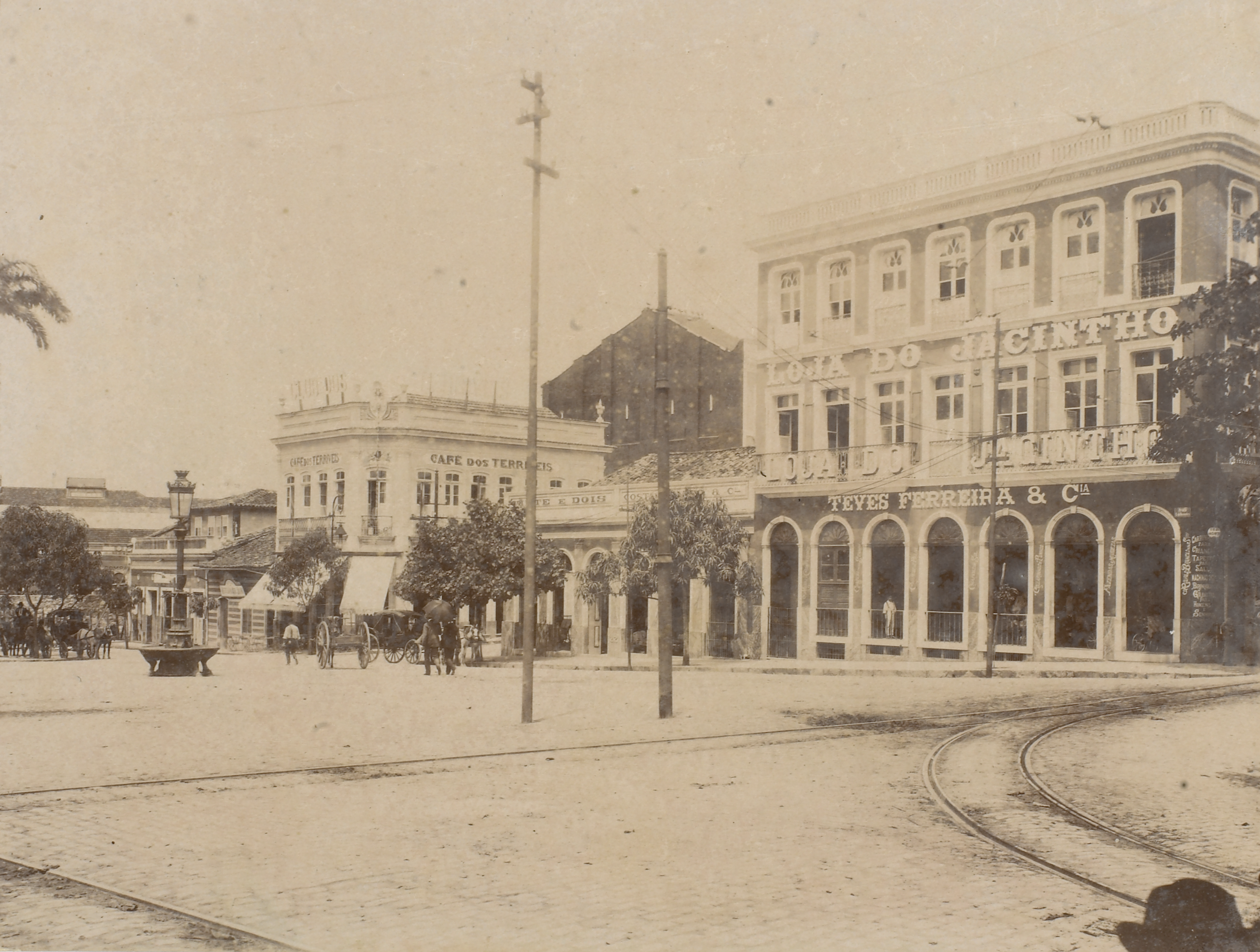
November 15 Square, Manaus, 1906

Manaus, which already boasted as the capital administrative of the State, experienced a great population growth and the economic advancement, resulting mainly from exports of raw materials until then exclusively from Amazon Region. With the wealth generated by the production and export of natural rubber (Hevea brasiliensis), the amazonian capital received large works such as the port of Manaus, the Amazonas Opera House, Palace of Justice, Reservoir of Mocó, the first network of electric energy and public transport services as trams. Vista as a reference, your headquarters became a symbol of prosperity and civilization for the Amazonas State, being the center of important artistic and cultural events. Bloomed so trade in luxury products and superfluous, with men and women from all over the world parading its streets and avenues, at purchase of the so-called "black gold", as was dubbed the natural rubber, to resell big profits in the main capitals of Europe and in the United States from 1910, difficult times began, due to the strong competition of natural rubber planted in rubber plantations the Asian continent, to European and American markets with superior advantages, which ultimately enact bankruptcy of Amazonian economy. By the late 19th century, the Brazilian rubber monopoly was slowly dying, as British and Dutch plantations in South-East Asia were producing cheaper, superior quality rubber, and by 1900 the Amazonas state had fallen into serious economic decline.

=== Free Economic Zone ===
Free trade zone of Manaus (also called Manaus Industrial Pole or Industrial Pole of the Brazilian Amazon) was an economic development project implemented by Act number 3 173 of 3 June 1957, that reframed, enlarged and established tax incentives for deployment of an industrial, commercial and agricultural pole in a physical area of 10 000 km^{2}, with headquarters in the city of Manaus. Despite the adoption in 1957, that project has only been in fact deployed, by Decree-Law number 288 of 28 February 1967.

Map of Amazonas, 1966. National Archives of Brazil.

The project was implemented by the Brazilian military government, at first, the benefits of this project was extended to the Western Amazon, formed by the States of Amazonas, Acre, Rondônia and Roraima. On August 20, 2008, the free trade area of Macapá, which was included in the Council of Manaus by Free Zone Superintendence (Suframa) and thus, the Amapá received the same benefit given for other Amazonian Brazilian States. The creation of the Manaus free trade zone aimed at promoting the occupation of this region population and raise the level of security to maintain your integrity in addition, brake deforestation in the region and recoup the preservation and sustainability of biodiversity present in the state. In its years of existence, the story of the Manaus Free Trade Zone is divided into four phases: the first, from 1967 to 1975, characterized the reference in the country's industrial policy for the import substitution of final goods and formation of the internal market; the second, from 1975 to 1990, was characterized by the adoption of measures promoting the domestic industry inputs, especially in the State of São Paulo (largest consumer at the time); the third, in 1991 and 1996, came into force on new Industrial policy and foreign trade, marked by the opening of the Brazilian economy, reducing the import tax for the rest of the country and emphasis on quality and productivity, with the implementation of the Brazilian policy quality and productivity (PBPQ in Portuguese) and Industrial competitiveness program; and the fourth and last, of the 1996–2002, marks its adaptation to a globalized economy scenarios and the adjustments demanded by the effects of the Real plan, as the movement of privatization and deregulation.

== Geography ==
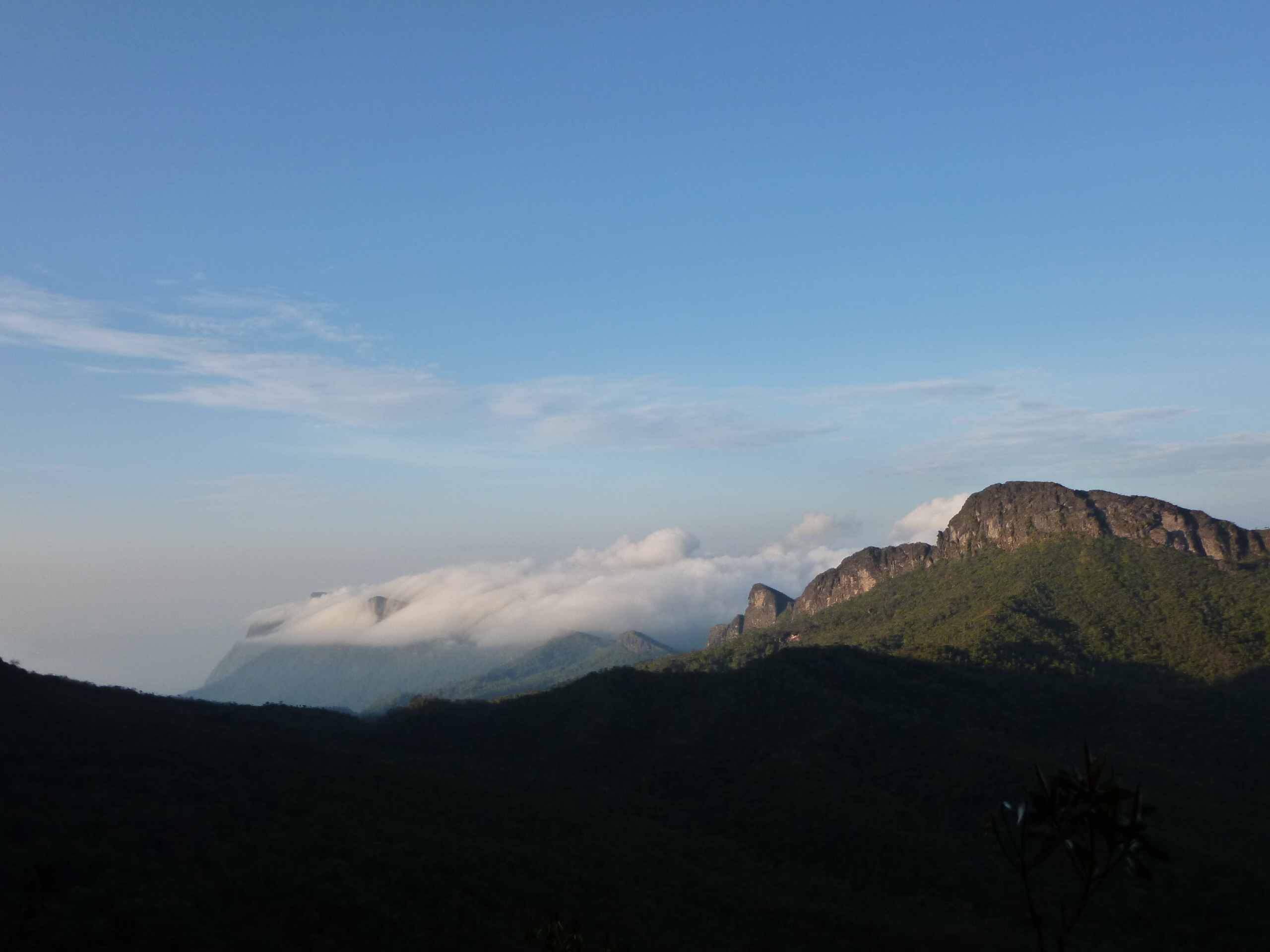
Pico da Neblina, Brazil's highest point, located at the northern end of the State.

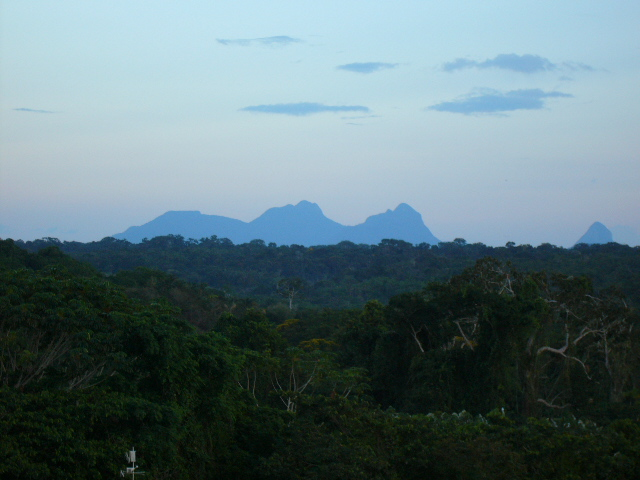
Mount Curicuriari, known as Mountain of the Sleeping Beauty, São Gabriel da Cachoeira, Brazil.

Characterized by being the largest of the States of Brazil, with an area of 1,559,159.148 square kilometres (601,994.713 sq mi). Amazonas has most of its land occupied by forest reserves and water. The access to the region is mainly made by waterway or by plane. It is located in the North of Brazil, bordering the States of Mato Grosso, Rondônia, and Acre to the South; Pará and Roraima, in the North East beyond the republics of Peru for 1,430 km along the Yavari river, Colombia for 1,644 km and Venezuela for 996 km to the Southwest and Northwest respectively. Most of its territory is in the time zone UTC−4 (with 4 hours less than Greenwich Mean Time (GMT). Thirteen municipalities in the West of the State are in the time zone UTC−5; it is one of the States of Brazil that contains two time zones in its territory. Amazonas is split by the Amazon river, the largest river by volume of water in the world. In the state, the river has several tributaries: Negro, Madeira, Purus, Japurá, Juruá, Içá or Putumayo and many other confluent. Most rivers are navigable for large ships.

Köppen climate types of Amazonas

=== Climate ===
The average temperature varies very little by season, between 26 by 28 °C (79 by 82 °F), the rainfall varies from 50 to 250 mm per month, averaging 2100 mm per year. Most of the state is in the tropical rainforest climate zone, a type of tropical climate in which there is no dry season—all months have mean precipitation values of at least 60 mm. Its latitude is within five degrees of the equator—which is dominated by the Intertropical Convergence Zone. The equatorial climate is denoted Af in the Köppen climate classification.

=== Relief ===
The relief of the state is relatively low, since in the region, 85% does not surpass 100 metres (330 ft) of altitude. The highest points of the state are the Pico da Neblina, with an approximate height of 2,994 metres (9,823 ft), followed by Pico Phelps or Pico 31 of March of 2,973 metres (9,754 ft), located in the border between Venezuela and Brazil, both mountains are in the municipality of Santa Isabel do Rio Negro and ironically, are the highest in Brazil.

=== Vegetation ===
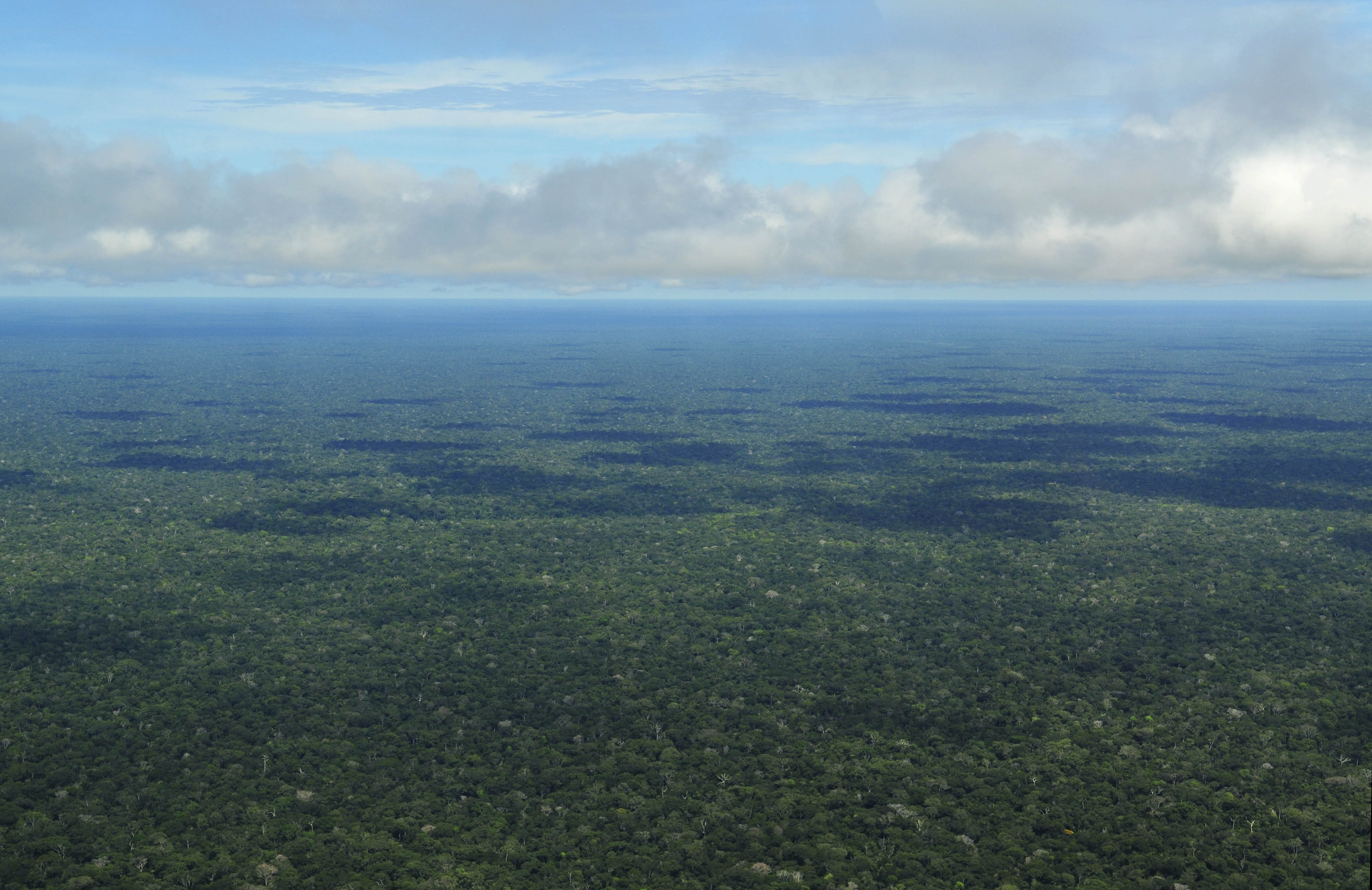
Aerial view of the Amazon Rainforest, near Manaus.

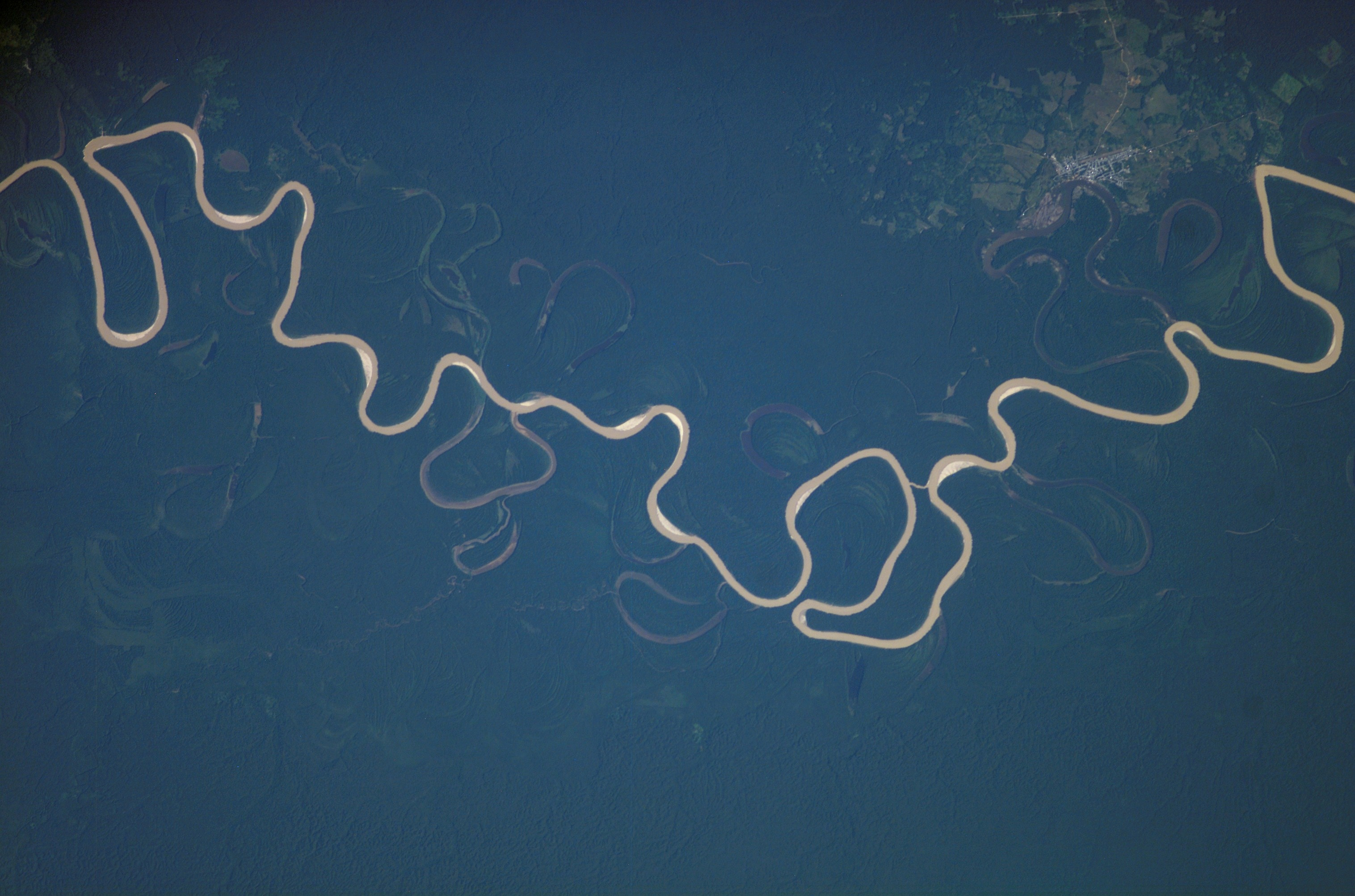
Juruá River, tributary of the Amazon River.

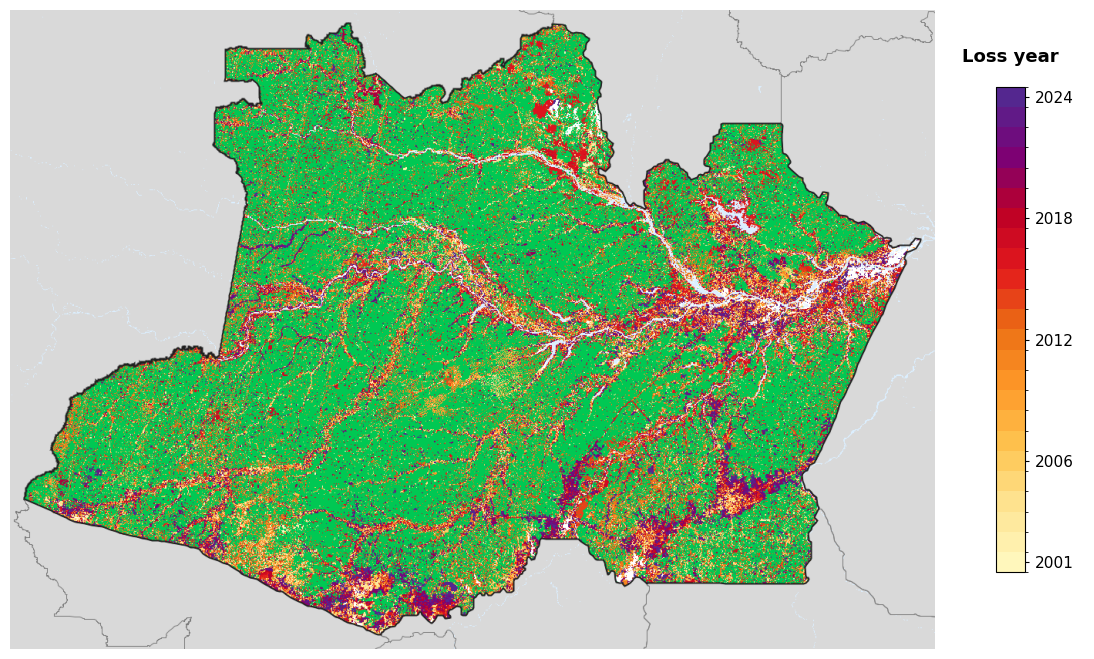
Tree-cover loss year in Amazonas, 2001-2024, from the Global Forest Change dataset.

Amazonas is almost entirely covered by the Amazon rainforest, 98% according to officials, and it is divided into three types of habitat, viz:

- igapos – permanently flooded land, roots of vegetation always submerged
- varzeas – higher than igapos, land is only submerged when rivers are at their highest during the wet season
- low plateau – higher still, never submerged

The Amazon represents over half of the planet's remaining rainforests and comprises the largest and most species-rich tract of tropical rainforest in the world. Wet tropical forests are the most species-rich biome, and tropical forests in the Americas are consistently more species-rich than the wet forests in Africa and Asia. As the largest tract of tropical rainforest in the Americas, the Amazonian rainforests have unparalleled biodiversity. More than 1/3 of all species in the world live in the Amazon Rainforest. and species are discovered on an almost daily basis. The largest biodiversity of the planet is present across the State of Amazonas, generating great surprise in its visitors.

== Demographics ==
Historical population
Year	Pop.	±%
1872	57,610	—
1890	147,915	+156.8%
1900	249,756	+68.9%
1920	363,166	+45.4%
1940	438,008	+20.6%
1950	514,099	+17.4%
1960	721,215	+40.3%
1970	960,934	+33.2%
1980	1,449,135	+50.8%
1991	2,102,901	+45.1%
2000	2,817,252	+34.0%
2010	3,483,985	+23.7%
2022	3,941,613	+13.1%

Ethnicities of Amazonas in 2022.
1. Pardo (mixed-race) (68.8%)
2. White (18.4%)
3. Indigenous (7.70%)
4. Black (4.90%)

The population of Amazonas represents 1.9% of the population in Brazil.

The chief commercial cities are Barcelos, Benjamin Constant, Eirunepe, Itacoatiara, Lábrea, Manacapuru, Manicoré, Parintins, and Tefé.

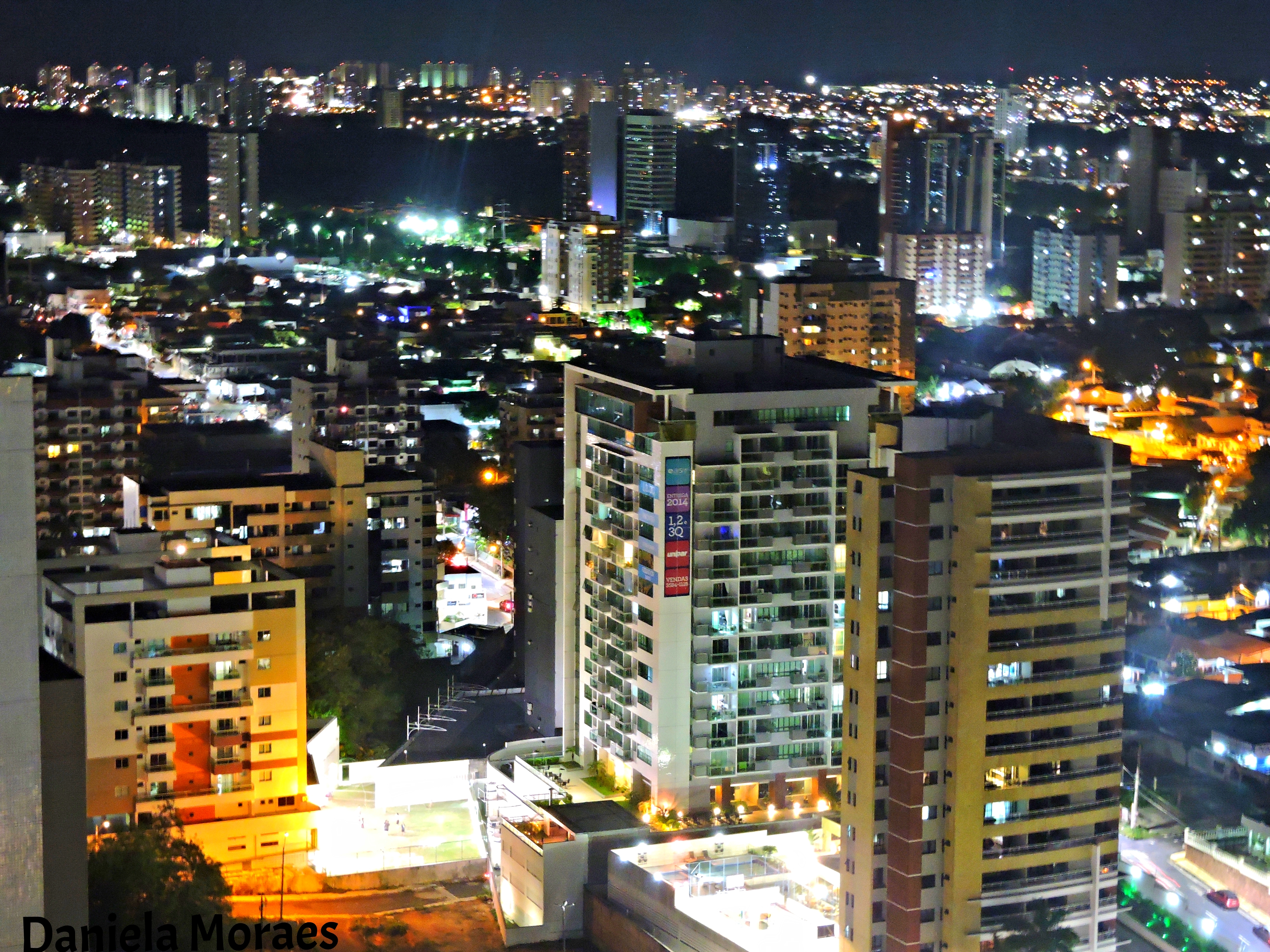
Manaus is the capital and largest city in the Amazonas State.

The state achieved a very great population growth in the early 20th century, due to the golden period of rubber, and after installation of the Industrial Pole of Manaus, in the 1960s. The state still maintains population rates above the national average. In the 1950s the state had a population growth of 3.6% per year, while Brazil has maintained a growth of 3.2%. In the period between the years 1991 and 2000, Amazon grew by 2.7% per annum while the national average remained at 1.6%. For 2018, the estimate is 4,080,611 inhabitants.

The composition of Amazonian population by gender shows that for every 100 female residents of the state there are 96 men; this small imbalance between the sexes is because women have a life expectancy of eight years higher than that of men. However, the migration to the state is mostly male.

The capital, Manaus, is the largest city in the northern region, with about 2,145,444 inhabitants. 52% of the state's population lives in the city.

Amazonas is the second largest precinct in northern Brazil, with 2,428,098 voters, according to the Superior Electoral Court.

Urbanization: 77.6% (2006); Population growth: 3.3% (1991–2000); Houses: 819,000 (2006).

The 2022 National Census revealed the following numbers: Pardo (Multiracial) people (68.80%), White people (18.40%), Indigenous people (7.70%), Black people (4.90%).

Amazonas is the Brazilian state with the biggest indigenous population.

According to a 2013 genetic study, the ancestry of the inhabitants of Manaus is 45.9% European, 37.8% Native American and 16.3% African.

=== Languages ===
53 out of the 274 known indigenous languages in Brazil are spoken in Amazonas. 17 official languages are recognized in the state, being Portuguese, Apurinã, Baniwa, Dessana, Kanamari, Marubo, Matis, Matses, Mawe, Mura, Nheengatu, Tariana, Tikuna, Tukano, Waiwai, Waimiri, and Yanomami.

=== Religion ===
Religion	Percentage	Number
Catholic	59.46 %	2,071,453
Protestant	31.16 %	1,085,480
Irreligious	6.03 %	209,952
Spiritist	0.42 %	14,800
Umbanda and Candomblé	0.05 %	1,677
Jewish	0.05 %	1,696
Source: IBGE 2010.

The Catholic Church in Amazonas comprises:

- the Archdiocese of Manaus (1892) with 92 parishes under Archbishop Leonardo Ulrich Steiner (2019),

and five suffragan dioceses of:

- Alto Solimões (1910) with eight parishes under Bishop Adolfo Zon Pereira (2015),
- Borba (1963) with eight parishes under Bishop Zenildo Luiz Pereira da Silva (2017),
- Coari (1963) with ten parishes under Bishop Marek Marian Piatek (2011),
- Parintins (1955) with nine parishes under Bishop José Albuquerque de Araújo (2022),
- São Gabriel da Cachoeira (1925 as Rio Negro) with 11 parishes under Bishop Edson Tashetto Damian (2009)

and two Territorial Prelates of:

- Itacoatiara (1963) with 13 parishes under Bishop José Ionilton Lisboa de Oliveira (2017), and
- Tefé (1910) with 31 parishes under Bishop José Altevir da Silva (2022);

Also two suffragans of Porto Velho (Rondônia):

- the diocese of Humaitá (1961) with eight parishes under Bishop Antônio Fontinele de Melo (2020) and
- the Territorial Prelature of Labrea (1925) with five parishes under Bishop Santiago Sánchez Sebastián (2016).

=== Largest cities ===
Largest cities or towns in Amazonas (2016 census by the Brazilian Institute of Geography and Statistics)
Rank		Mesoregion	Pop.	Rank		Mesoregion	Pop.
1	Manaus	Centro	2,094,391	11	Iranduba	Centro	46,703
2	Parintins	Centro	112,716	12	Lábrea	Sul	44,071
3	Itacoatiara	Centro	98,503	13	São Gabriel da Cachoeira	Norte	43,831
4	Manacapuru	Centro	95,330	14	Benjamin Constant	Sudoeste	40,417
5	Coari	Centro	83,929	15	Borba	Sul	39,885
6	Tabatinga	Sudoeste	62,346	16	Autazes	Centro	37,752
7	Tefé	Centro	62,230	17	São Paulo de Olivença	Sudoeste	37,300
8	Maués	Centro	61,110	18	Careiro	Centro	36,922
9	Manicoré	Sul	53,890	19	Nova Olinda do Norte	Centro	35,800
10	Humaitá	Sul	52,354	20	Eirunepé	Sudoeste	34,461

=== Statistics ===
- Vehicles: 651,536 (March/2007);
- Mobile phones: 4.4 million (April/2007)
- Telephones: 998 thousand (April/2007)
- Cities: 62 (2007).

== Education ==
Portuguese is the official national language, and thus the primary language taught in schools. But English and Spanish are part of the official high school curriculum.

Nheengatu, an indigenous Tupian language, also has official status in the municipality of São Gabriel da Cachoeira and has a few thousand speakers in that region.

=== Educational institutions ===
- Federal University of Amazonas (UFAM) (Portuguese: Universidade Federal do Amazonas);
- Amazonas State University (UEA) (Portuguese: Universidade do Estado do Amazonas);
- Federal Institute of Amazonas (IFAM) (Portuguese: Instituto Federal do Amazonas).
- National Institute of Amazonian Research (Portuguese: Instituto Nacional de Pesquisas da Amazônia).

==== Private Universities ====
- Paulista University (Unip-AM) (Universidade Paulista).
- University Nilton Lins.
- Lutheran University of Brazil (Universidade Luterana do Brasil (ULBRA)).
- University Center of Amazon Higher Education (Portuguese: Centro Universitário de Educação Superior de Amazonas (CIESA)).
- Instituto de Ensino Superior Materdei.
- University Literatus (Uni-Cel).
- Metropolitan College (FAMETRO) (Portuguese: Faculdade Metropolitana).
- Amazon Baptist Graduate School (ESBAM) (Portuguese: Escola Superior Batista do Amazonas).
- Laureate International University Uninorte (Laureate Uninorte).
- DeVry Martha Falcao.
- Unilasalle.

== Economy ==
The industrial sector is the largest component of GDP at 69.9%, followed by the service sector at 23.93% (2012). Agriculture represents 3.6% of GDP (2004). Amazonas exports: mobile phones 48.7%, others electronics 19.5%, motorcycles 7.7% (2002).

Share of the Brazilian economy: 1.5% (IBGE: 2015).

Amazonas economy was once reliant almost entirely upon rubber; today it has wide and varied industries, including the farming of cassava, oranges, and other agricultural products.

Recently the Brazilian government is pursuing the development of industries whose main focus will be the exporting of consumer goods. Due to its geographical proximity to the markets in the northern hemisphere and Amazon countries, like Venezuela, they believe this move will have a great economic impact not only in the north region of Brazil but in the entire country.

Over the last decades, a system of federal investments and tax incentives have turned the surrounding region into a major industrial center (the Free Economic Zone of Manaus). The mobile phone and game console companies Flextronics, LG and Sony run manufacturing plants in Manaus. Other major electronics and motorcycle manufacturers such as Samsung Electronics, Honda and Yamaha have plants as well.

=== Tourism ===
Tourism is now focused on ecotourism, centered in the cities of Barcelos, Manaus, Parintins, Presidente Figueredo, and Sao Gabriel da Cachoeira.

==== Ecotourism ====
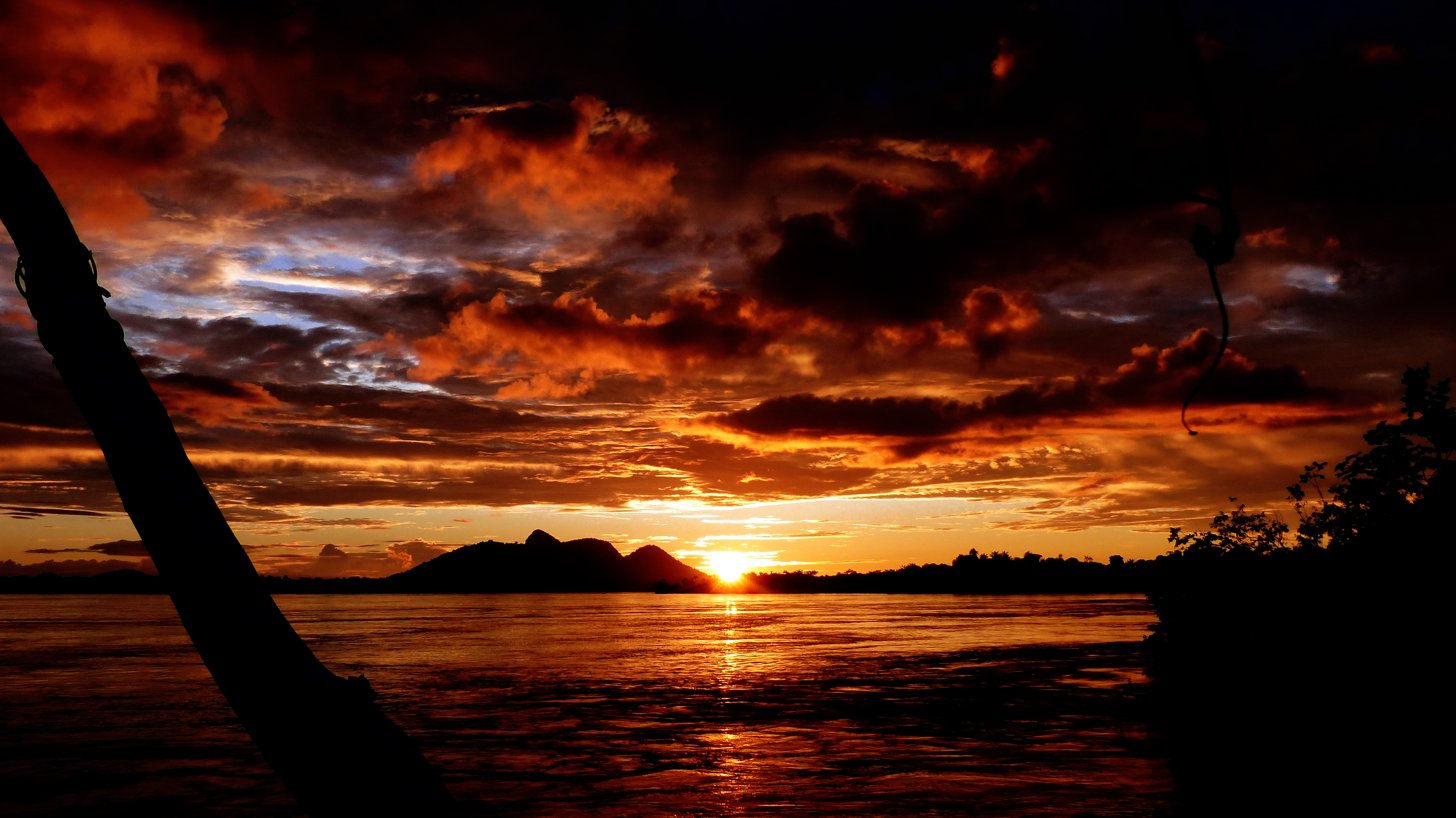
Sunset in the hill of the Six Lakes, Sao Gabriel da Cachoeira, Amazonas, Brazil

- Amazon Rainforest.
- Amazon River
- Meeting of the Waters (Rio Negro river and Solimões river, in Brazilian Portuguese the river Solimões is the local name of an extension of the Amazon River).
- Rio Negro
- Anavilhanas Archipelago – The world's largest fresh water archipelago of river islands, Anavilhanas is located on the Rio Negro in the Brazilian Amazon – 100 km upstream from Manaus.

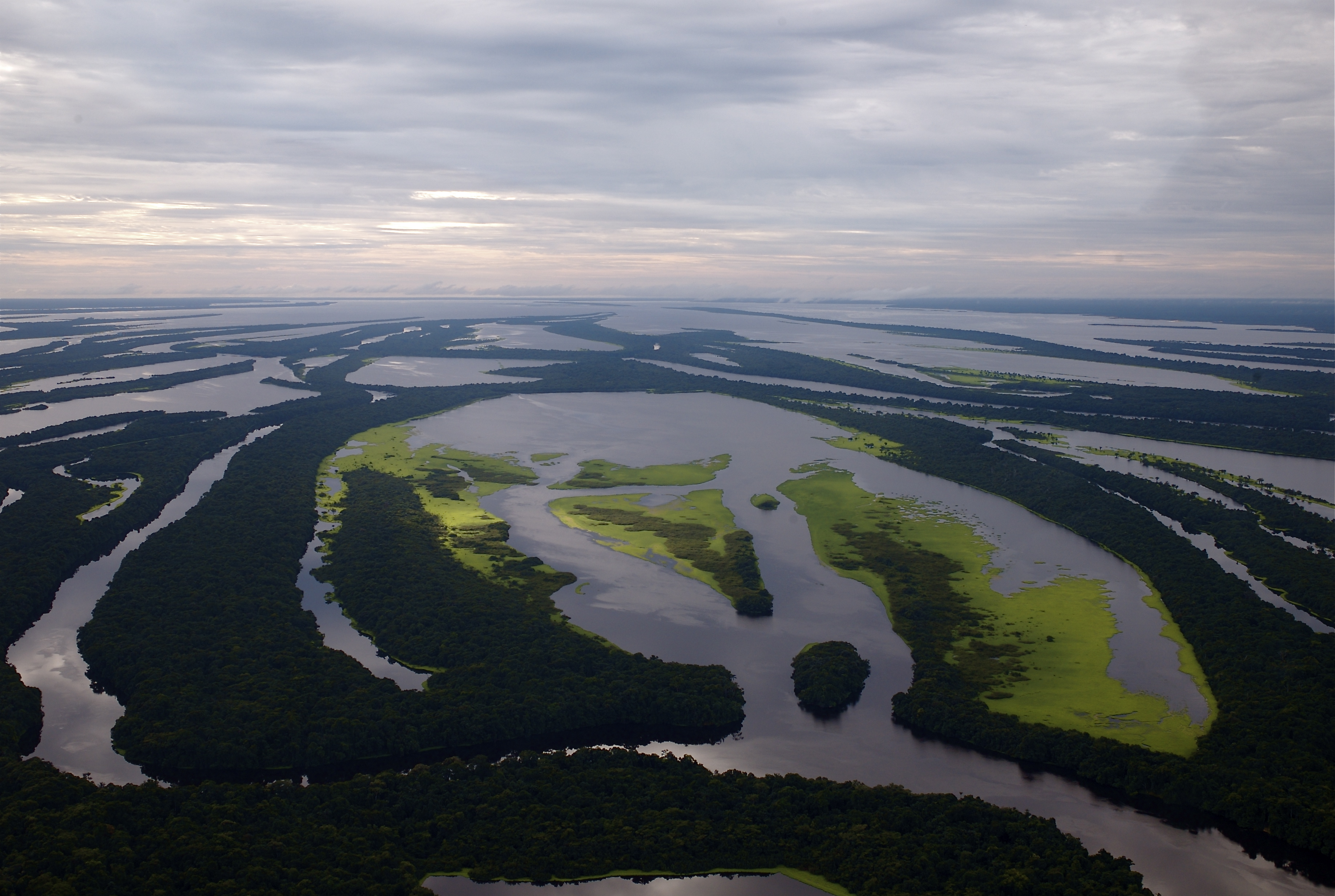
The Anavilhanas National Park is located between Manaus and Novo Airão.

- Lago Janauari Ecological Park
- Pico da Neblina National Park, Pico 31 de Março (Pico Phelps in Venezuela).
- State Park Ecological Serra do Acará.
- State Reserve Ecological of Nhamundá.
- Amazon Jungle Hikes & Canopy Tours
- Adolfo Ducke Forest Reserve

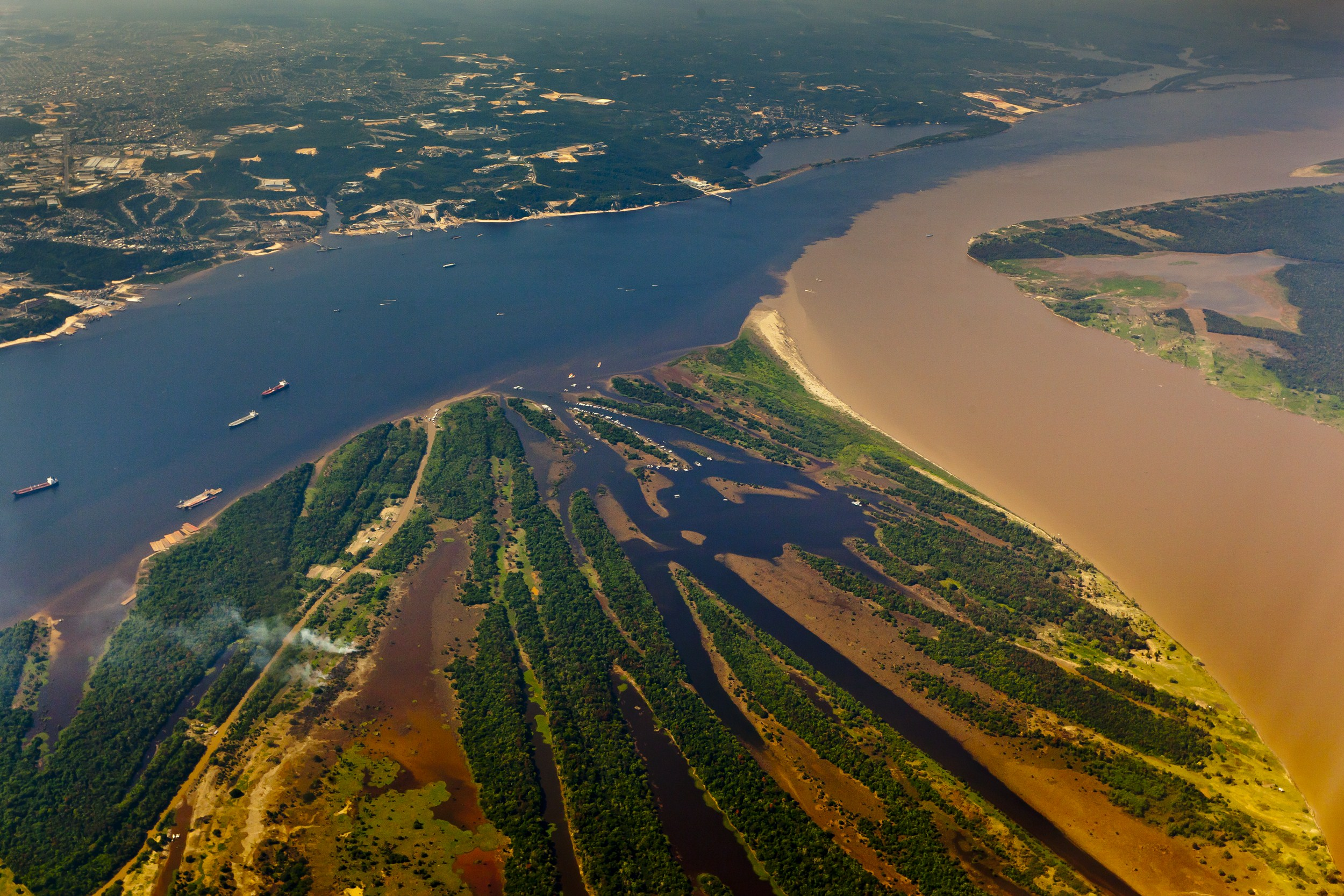
The Meeting of Waters is the confluence between the dark (blackwater) Rio Negro and the pale sandy-colored (whitewater) Amazon River or Rio Solimões, as the upper section of the Amazon is known in Brazil upriver of this confluence.

- Mamirauá Sustainable Development Reserve
- Jaú National Park
- Abufari Biological Reserve
- Pompadour fish
- Cardinal tetra
- Pterophyllum scalare (freshwater angelfish)
- Açutuba Beach
- Tupe Beach

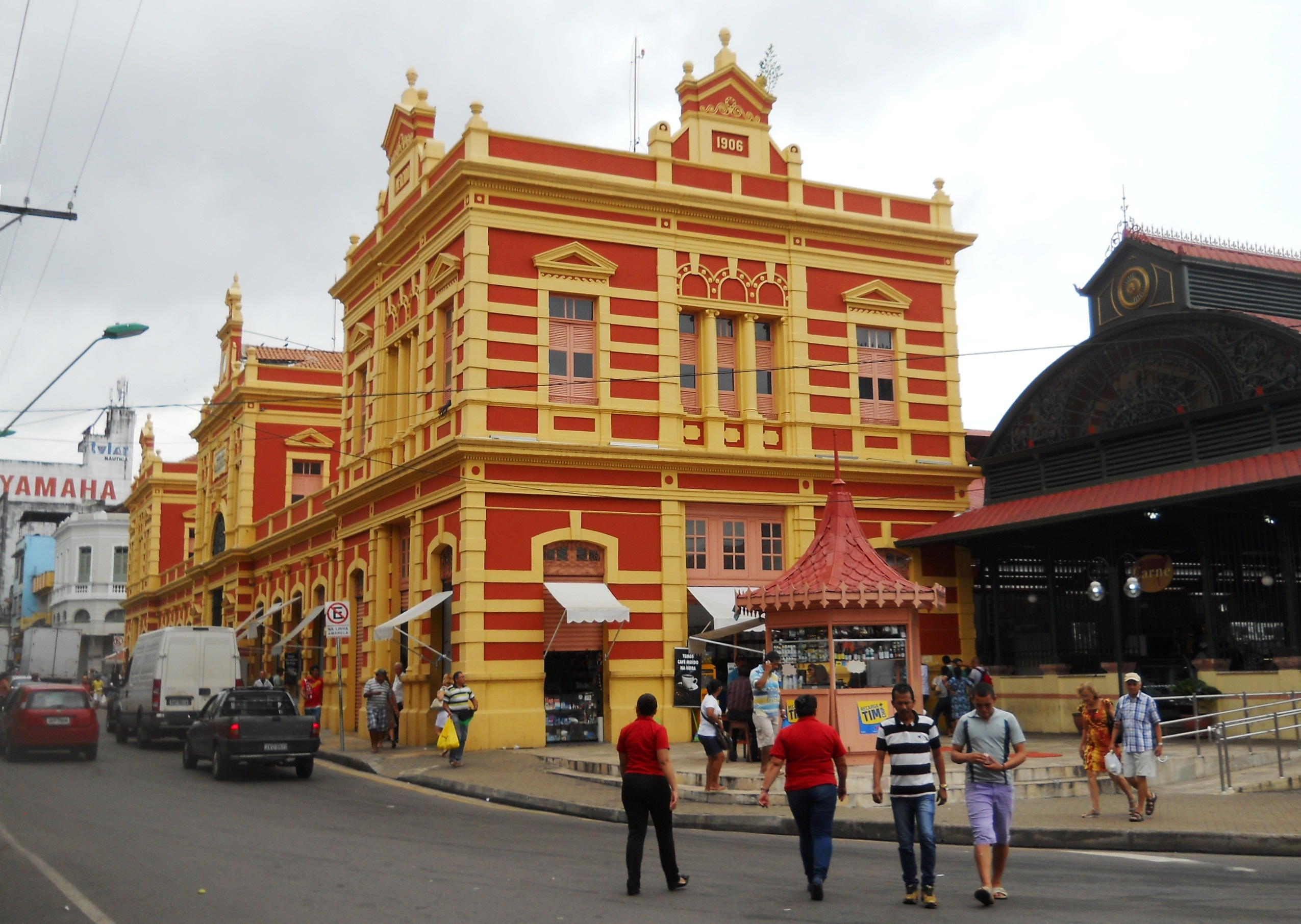
Adolpho Lisboa Municipal Market in Manaus, Amazonas, Brazil

==== Heritage and culture sites ====
- City of Manaus (Rio Negro Palace, Amazon Theater, Justice Palace, Pied Tamarin Ecological Reserves, Municipal Park of Mindú, CIGS Zoo, and Police Museum)
- City of Parintins (folklore festival occurs in June each year, including the carnival, which occurs in February)
- City of Sao Gabriel da Cachoeira (culture of indigenous tribes: Baniwa, Yanomami, and Tukano, the hill of the Six Lakes and Pico da Neblina, the highest mountain in Brazil)
- Ponta Negra Beach
- Presidente Figueiredo (natural waterfalls)
- Balbina Lake (piranha fishing and other Amazonian fish)
- The Science Grove
- Boi-Bumbas of Parintins Festival
- Adolpho Lisboa Municipal Market

== Infrastructure ==
=== Airports ===
Eduardo Gomes International Airport(MAO) in Manaus employs roughly 3,300 people, among employees of Infraero, public agencies, concession holders, airlines and auxiliary services. The airport has two passenger terminals, one for scheduled flights and the other for regional aviation. It also has three cargo terminals: Terminal I was opened in 1976, Terminal II in 1980 and Terminal III in 2004. Eduardo Gomes International Airport is Brazil's third largest in freight movement, handling the import and export demand from the Manaus Industrial Complex.

Other airports include Tabatinga International, and a further 31 domestic airports including Tefé (regular flights to Manaus by Rico Linhas Aereas), Parintins (Julio Belém), Coari, Lábrea, Manicoré, Novo Aripuanã, Borba, Itacoatiara, Presidente Figueiredo, São Gabriel da Cachoeira, Cucuí, Iaguarete, Benjamin Constant, Eirunepé, and Boca do Acre.

=== Highways ===
BR-174 from Manaus 519 km via Jundia and Novo Paraiso to Boa Vista (Roraima), BR-210, BR-230 (Rodovia Transamazônica) The Trans-Amazonian Highway east from Itaituba (Para) 1266 km via Humaitá to Lábrea, mostly unpaved and impassable in the rainy season, BR-307, BR-317, BR-319 for 869 km south via Caiero, Humaita to Pôrto Velho (Rondônia state), mostly unpaved and impassable in the rainy season, BR-411, BR-413.

One road to Roraima state: BR-174.

One road to Para state: BR-230.

One road to Rondônia state: BR-319.

One road to Acre state: BR-317, plus BR-364 from Rondônia to Acre passes through Amazonas for 8.6 km.

== Culture ==
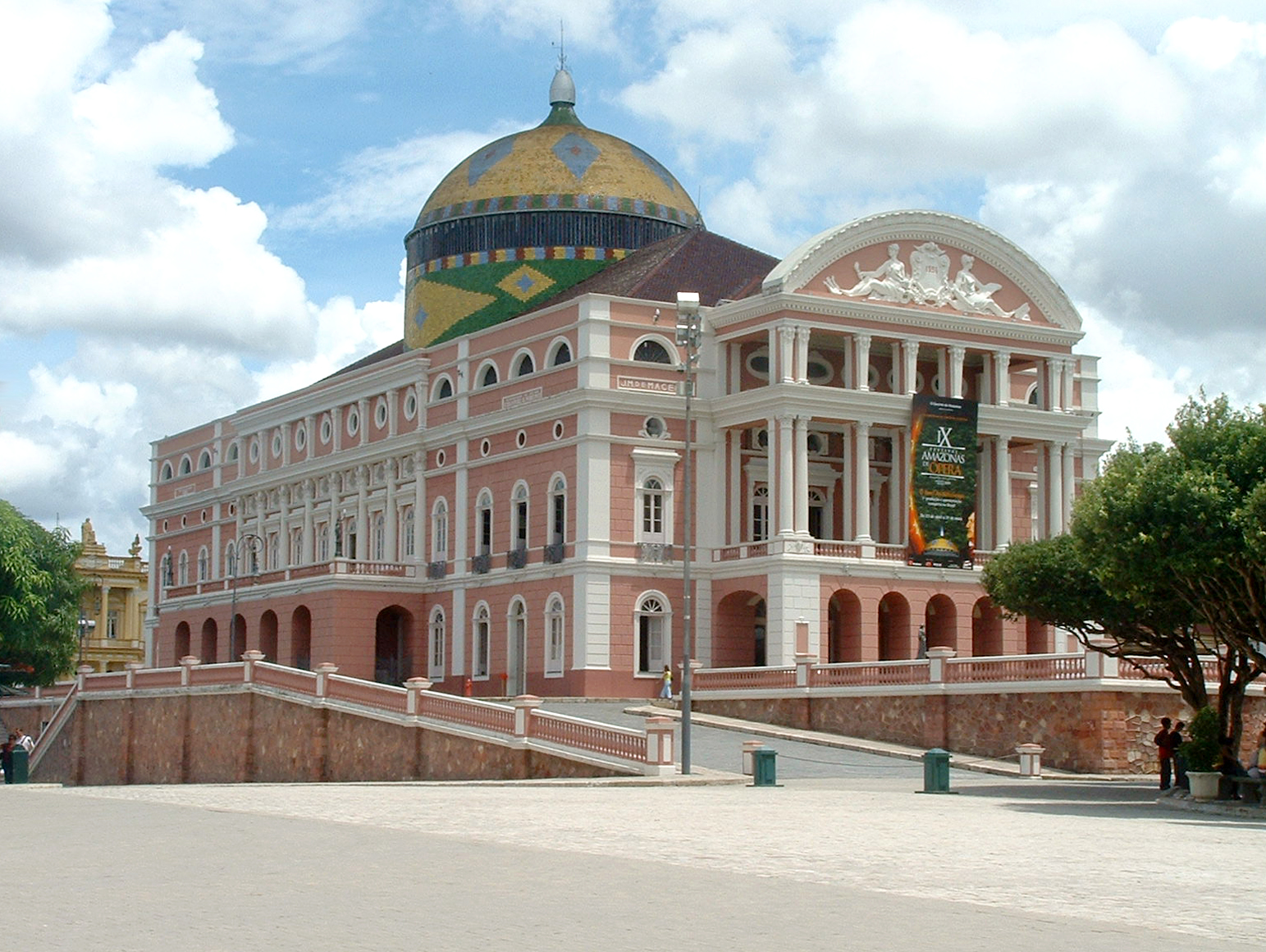
Amazon Theater is the location of the opera festival.

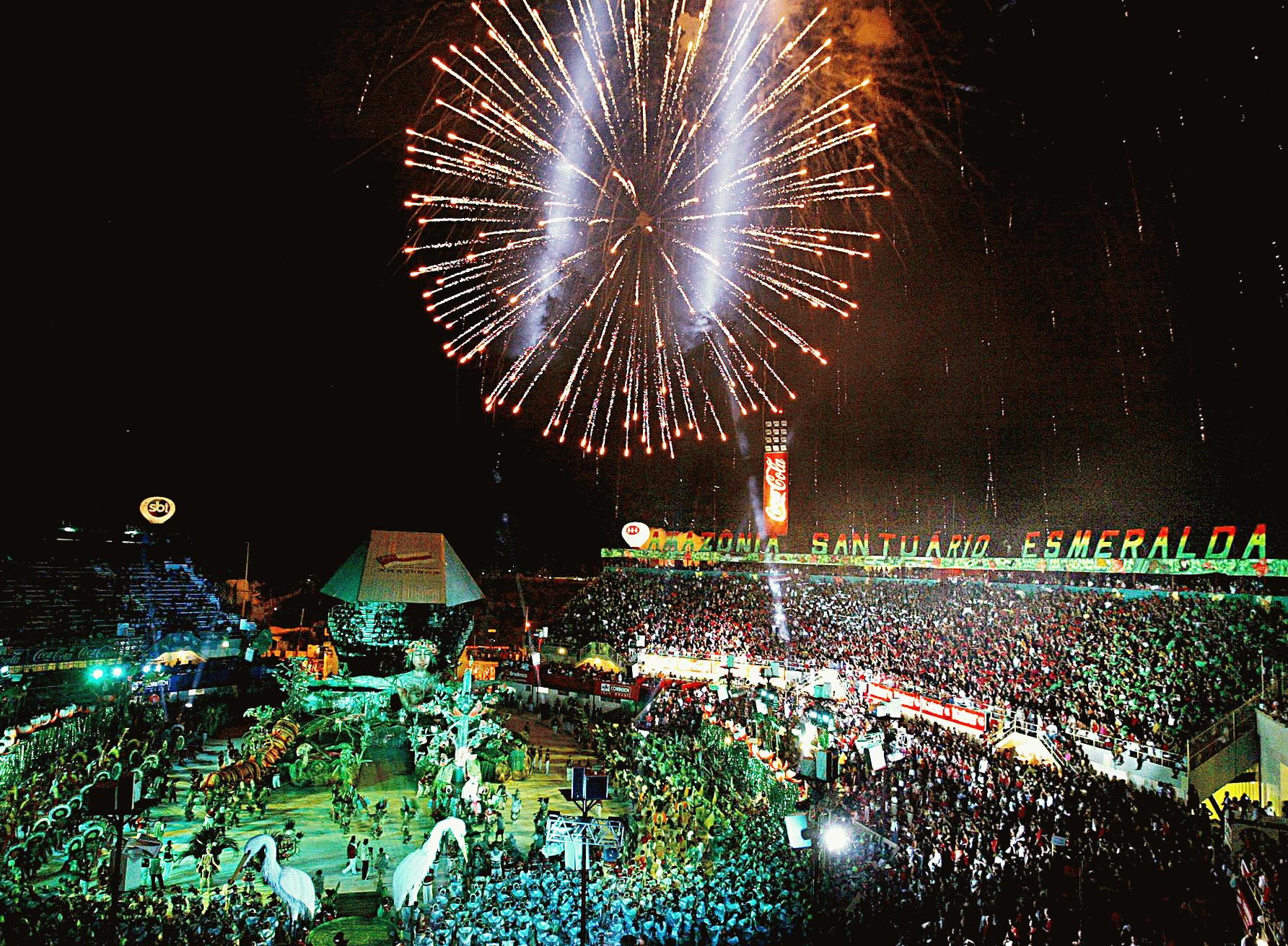
Parintins Folklore Festival

The state also holds one of the greatest folkloric festivals of the country: Parintins Folklore Festival, which combines music, dance and all the cultural roots of the state, and the Amazonas Opera Festival.

=== Main theaters ===
- Amazon Theatre (The most famous)
- Manauara Theater
- Chaminé Theater
- LaSalle Theater
- Cultural Center Peoples of Amazonian

=== Main museums ===
- MUSA – Amazonia Museum
- Indians Museum (Museu do Índio)
- Casa Eduardo Ribeiro Museum
- Paço da Liberdade Museum
- Museum of Natural Sciences
- Caucho Museum or Seringal Museum (Official name: Museu do Seringal)
- Tiradentes Museum Manaus

=== Malls ===
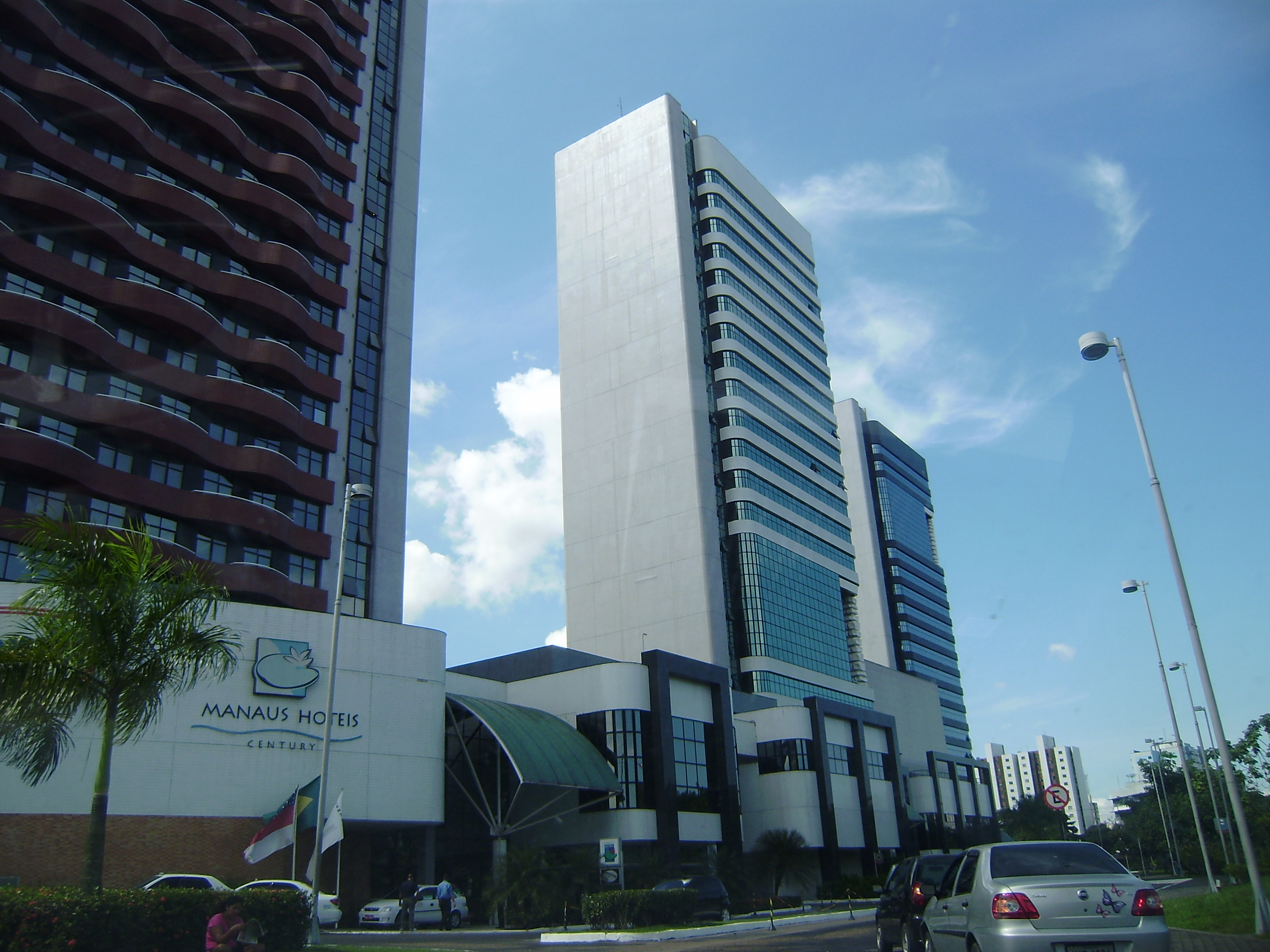
Millennium Shopping in Manaus

- Manauara Mall Center
- Amazonas Mall Center
- ViaNorte Mall
- Ponta Negra Mall
- Millennium Mall
- Samauma Park and Mall Center
- Cidade Leste Mall
- Grande Circular Mall
- UAI São José Mall
- Parintins Mall

== Sports ==
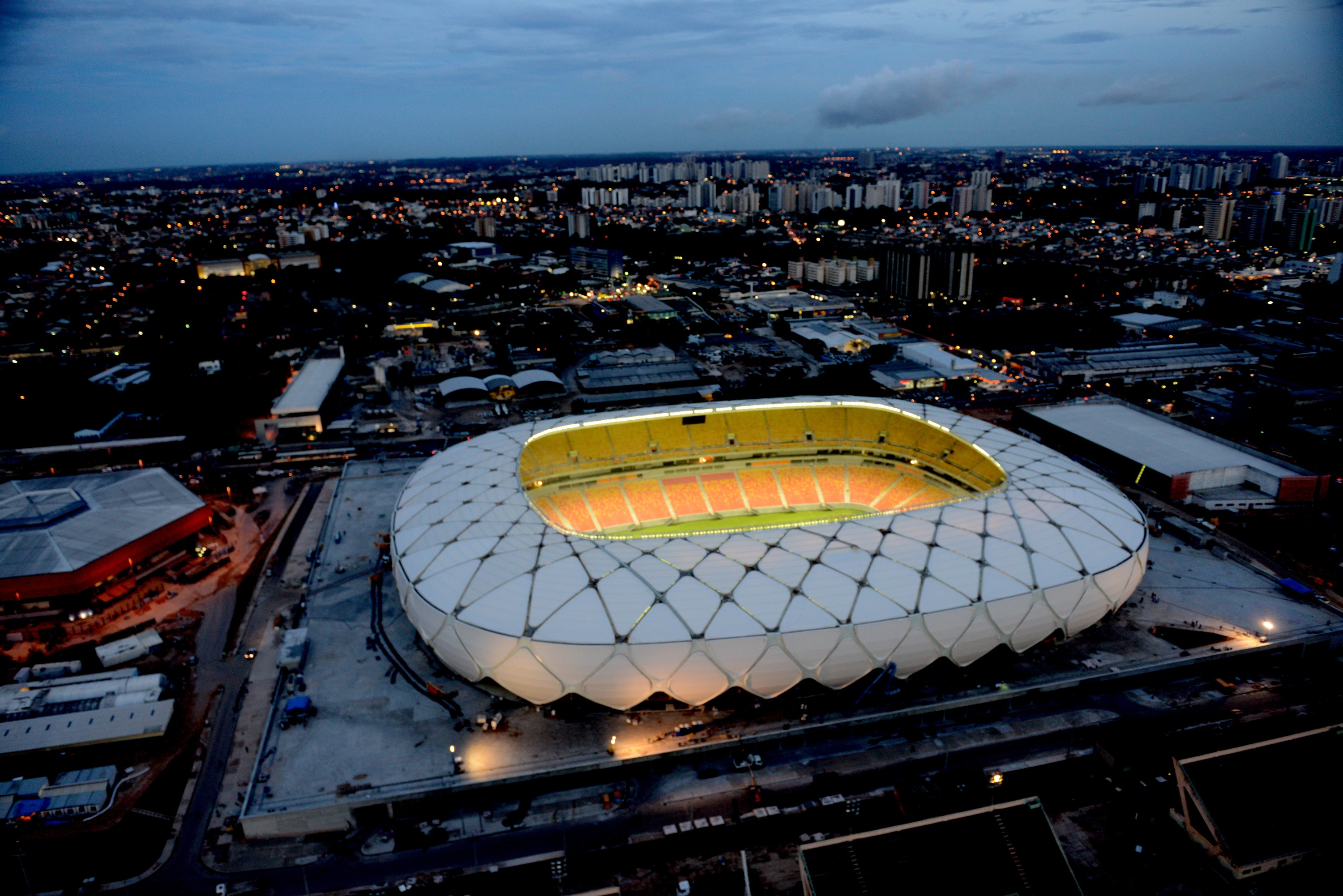
The Amazon Arena hosted games during the 2014 FIFA World Cup.

Manaus was one of the host cities of the 2014 FIFA World Cup, for which Brazil was the host nation. There are other small soccer stadiums in the Amazonas, they are:

- Stadium Carlos Zamith
- Stadium Roberto Simonsen
- Stadium of Colina
- Stadium Gilberto Mestrinho
- Stadium Tupy Cantahede
- Stadium Floro de Mendonça
- Stadium Francisco Garcia
- Among other stadiums in the Amazonas

The Amazonia Arena is the largest stadium in the Amazonas, it was built to host some matches of the FIFA World Cup of 2014 and to host some football matches of the 2016 Summer Olympics.

== See also ==
- Amazônia Legal
- Amazonas, Venezuela
- Amazonas Department, in Colombia
- Amazonas Region, in Peru
- Amazonas's inland
