= Mário Roberto Emmett Anglim =

American-born bishop

Most Reverend Mário Roberto Emmett Anglim, C.Ss.R. D.D.
- Prelate of Coari
- Church: Roman Catholic Church
- See: Territorial Prelature of Coari
- In office: April 24, 1964— April 13, 1973
- Predecessor: None
- Successor: Gutemberg Freire Régis, C.Ss.R

Orders
- Ordination: January 6, 1948
- Consecration: June 2, 1966 by John Cody

Personal details
- Born: March 4, 1922 Lombard, Illinois, United States
- Died: April 13, 1973 (aged 51)

Mário Roberto Emmett Anglim, C.Ss.R. (March 4, 1922 – April 13, 1973) was an American-born bishop in the Catholic Church. He served as the first Prelate of the Territorial Prelature of Coari in the state of Amazonas, Brazil from 1964–1973.

== Biography ==
Robert Emmett Anglim was born in Lombard, Illinois. He was educated at the Redemptorist Minor Seminary, St. Joseph's College, in Kirkwood, Missouri. He attended novitiate in De Soto, Missouri where he professed religious vows as a Redemptorist in the St. Louis Province. He studied for the priesthood at Immaculate Conception Seminary in Oconomowoc, Wisconsin and was ordained there on January 6, 1948.

Anglim served as a missionary in the Vice Province of Manaus, Brazil until April 24, 1964 when Pope Paul VI named him to be the first prelate of the newly established Territorial Prelature of Coari. He was appointed Titular Bishop of Gaguari by Paul VI on March 23, 1966 and was consecrated a bishop by Archbishop John Patrick Cody of Chicago on June 2, 1966. The principal co-consecrators were Archbishop João de Souza Lima of Manaus and Bishop Tomás Guilherme Murphy, C.Ss.R. of Juazeiro. Anglim attended the third and fourth sessions of the Second Vatican Council and was responsible for initiating the Council's reforms in the prelacy. On May 2, 1970 he was appointed Apostolic Administrator of the Territorial Prelature of Lábrea. He held the position for a little over a year when a new prelate was named on June 7, 1971. Bishop Anglim served the Prelature of Coari for a total of nine years before his death on April 13, 1973.
