= Catedral Metropolitana =

Catedral Metropolitana, or Metropolitan Cathedral, can refer to several cathedrals including:

- Guadalajara Cathedral
- Mexico City Metropolitan Cathedral
- Rio de Janeiro Cathedral
- Catedral Metropolitana de La Paz
- Catedral Metropolitana de Quito
- Catedral Metropolitana de San Salvador
- Catedral Metropolitana de Santiago
- Catedral Metropolitana de Sucre

== See also ==
- Metropolitan cathedral (disambiguation)
- Metropolitan bishop
