= Metropolitan Cathedral of Our Lady of the Conception, Manaus =

Metropolitan Cathedral of Our Lady of the Conception
- Catedral Metropolitana Nossa Senhora da Conceição
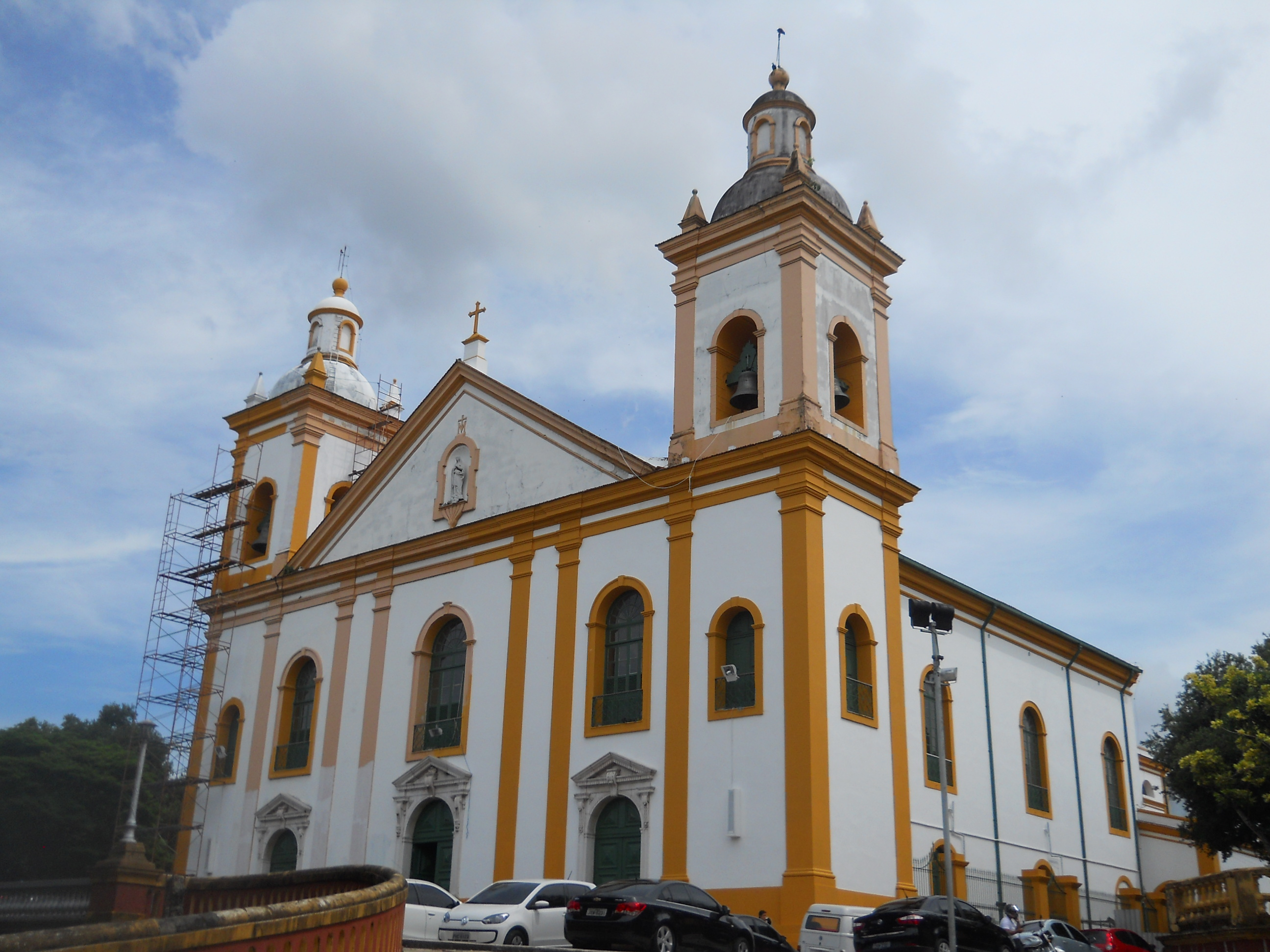

- Location in Brazil
- 3.1352°S 60.0255°W
- Location: Manaus
- Country: Brazil
- Denomination: Roman Catholic Church

Architecture
- Architectural type: Greek

Administration
- Archdiocese: Roman Catholic Archdiocese of Manaus

The Metropolitan Cathedral of Our Lady of the Conception (Portuguese: Catedral Metropolitana Nossa Senhora da Conceição), also called Catedral Metropolitana de Manaus, is a Catholic cathedral located in the city of Manaus, in the state of Amazonas in northern Brazil. It is the mother church of Manaus.

== History ==
The church dates back to the Carmelite missionaries who, in 1695, created the early Church of Our Lady.

It was rebuilt by the President of the Province Manoel da Gama Lobo D'Almada, who expanded its facilities. The new work, however, was destroyed by a devastating fire in 1850.

The current building is in Greek style, with much of the material imported from Europe, especially Portugal; the six bells were made in a Portuguese foundry, and the chapel, baptistery and three altars all are made of limestone from Lisbon. The tiles came from Nova Rainha (now Parintins).

The church was officially opened in 1878. The Diocese of Amazonas was created in 1892.

In 1946 the church was elevated to cathedral status.

== See also ==
- Roman Catholicism in Brazil
- Metropolitan cathedral (disambiguation)
