= Diocese of São Gabriel da Cachoeira =

Catholic ecclesiastical territory

Diocese of São Gabriel da Cachoeira Dioecesis Cachoëirensis

Catholic
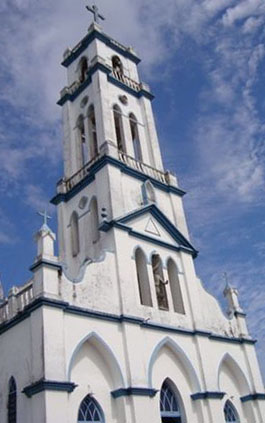
- Cathedral of St. Gabriel

Location
- Country: Brazil
- Ecclesiastical province: Manaus

Statistics
- Area: 286,866 km^{2} (110,760 sq mi)
- Population: Total; Catholics: (as of 2004); 62,000; 56,000 (90.3%)

Information
- Rite: Latin Rite
- Established: 1 May 1925 (101 years ago)
- Cathedral: Catedral São Gabriel

Current leadership
- Pope: Leo XIV
- Bishop: Raimundo Vanthuy Neto
- Metropolitan Archbishop: Leonardo Ulrich Steiner
- Bishops emeritus: Edson Taschetto Damian

The Roman Catholic Diocese of São Gabriel da Cachoeira (Latin: Dioecesis Cachoëirensis) is a diocese located in the city of São Gabriel da Cachoeira in the ecclesiastical province of Manaus in Brazil.

The Bishop is Mgr Edson Taschetto Damian. He was named on March, 4th, 2009, and was blessed on May, 24th, 2009.

== History ==
- May 1, 1925: Established as Territorial Prelature of Rio Negro
- October 30, 1980: Promoted as Diocese of Rio Negro
- October 21, 1981: Renamed as Diocese of São Gabriel da Cachoeira

== Bishops ==
=== Ordinaries, in reverse chronological order ===
- Bishops of São Gabriel da Cachoeira (Roman rite), below
  - Bishop Edson Taschetto Damian (2009.03.04 - present)
  - Bishop José Song Sui-Wan, S.D.B. (宋瑞雲) (2002.01.23 – 2009.03.04)
  - Bishop Walter Ivan de Azevedo, S.D.B. (1988.02.27 – 2002.01.23)
  - Bishop Michele Alagna Foderá, S.D.B. (1981.10.21 – 1988.02.27)
- Bishops of Rio Negro (Roman Rite), below
  - Bishop Michele Alagna Foderá, S.D.B. (1980.10.30 – 1981.10.21)
- Prelates of Rio Negro (Roman Rite), below
  - Bishop Michele Alagna Foderá, S.D.B. (1967.06.13 – 1980.10.30)
  - Bishop Pedro Massa, S.D.B. (1941.04.05 – 1967.06.13)

=== Coadjutor bishops ===
- José Domitrovitsch, S.D.B. (1949-1961), as Coadjutor Prelate; did not succeed to see; appointed Prelate of Humaitá, Amazonas
- João Batista Marchesi, S.D.B. (1962-1967), as Coadjutor Prelate; did not succeed to see
- Walter Ivan de Azevedo, S.D.B. (1986-1988)
