= Territorial Prelature of Itacoatiara =

Latin Catholic territory in Brazil

Coordinates: 3°08′S 58°26′W

Territorial Prelature of Itacoatiara Praelatura Territorialis Itacoatiarensis

Catholic

Location
- Country: Brazil
- Ecclesiastical province: Manaus

Statistics
- Area: 83,012 km^{2} (32,051 sq mi)
- Population: Total; Catholics: (as of 2004); 155,254; 126,726 (81.6%)

Information
- Denomination: Catholic Church
- Sui iuris church: Latin Church
- Rite: Roman Rite
- Established: 13 July 1963 (63 years ago)
- Cathedral: Catedral Prelatícia Nossa Senhora do Rosário

Current leadership
- Pope: Leo XIV
- Prelate: Edmilson Tadeu Canavarros dos Santos, S.D.B.
- Metropolitan Archbishop: Sérgio Eduardo Castriani, C.S.Sp.

The Territorial Prelature of Itacoatiara (Latin: Praelatura Territorialis Itacoatiarensis) is a Latin Church territorial prelature of the Catholic Church in Amazonas state, inland northern Brazil. It is a suffragan in the ecclesiastical province of the metropolitan Archdiocese of Manaus.

Its cathedral is the Catedral Prelatícia Nossa Senhora do Rosário, dedicated to Our Lady of the Rosary, in the episcopal see of Itacoatiara, Amazonas.

== History ==
- Established on July 13, 1963 as Territorial Prelature of Itacoatiara, on territory split off from its Metropolitan, the Archdiocese of Manaus.

== Statistics ==
As per 2014, it pastorally served 137,400 Catholics (79.1% of 173,800 total) on 58,424 km^{2} in 13 parishes with 14 priests (8 diocesan, 6 religious), 12 lay religious (6 brothers, 6 sisters) and 2 seminarians.

== Ordinaries ==
(all Roman rite)

Territorial (Bishop-)Prelates of Itacoatiara

- Francis Paul McHugh, Scarboro Foreign Mission Society (S.F.M.) (born Canada) (20 July 1965 - retired 15 July 1972), Titular Bishop of Legis Volumni (1967.08.04 – death 2003.05.06)
  - Apostolic Administrator João de Souza Lima (1972 - 1975) while Metropolitan Archbishop of Manaus (Brazil) (1958.01.16 – resigned 1980.04.21), next Coadjutor Archbishop of São Salvador da Bahia (Brazil) (1980.04.21 – retired 1981.10.19); previously Titular Bishop of Derbe (1949.05.14 – 1955.02.06) as Auxiliary Bishop of Archdiocese of Diamantina (Brazil) (1949.05.14 – 1955.02.06), Bishop of Nazaré (Brazil) (1955.02.06 – 1958.01.16)
- Jorge Eduardo Marskell, S.F.M. (born Canada) (1975 (bishop-elect until 1978.05.05) – death 2 July 1998)
- Carillo Gritti, Consolata Missionaries (I.M.C.) (born Italy) (5 January 2000 – death 9 June 2016)
- José Ionilton Lisboa de Oliveira, Society of Divine Vocations (S.D.V.) (first native incumbent) (19 April 2017 – 3 November 2023)
- Edmilson Tadeu Canavarros dos Santos, Salesians of Don Bosco (S.D.B.) (2 August 2024 – Present)

== See also ==
- List of Catholic dioceses in Brazil

== Sources and external links ==
- GCatholic.org, with Google satellite photo - data for all sections
- Catholic Hierarchy
