= Marek Marian Piątek =

Most Reverend Marek Marian Piątek, C.Ss.R.
- Bishop of Coari
- Church: Roman Catholic Church
- See: Roman Catholic Diocese of Coari
- In office: since October 9, 2013
- Predecessor: None (elevated from prelate)
- Successor: Current

Orders
- Ordination: June 5, 1980
- Consecration: August 12, 2011 by Murilo Sebastião Ramos Krieger

Personal details
- Born: October 22, 1954 (age 71) Tuchów, Poland
- Coat of arms

Dom Marek Marian Piątek (born 10 October 1954) is a Polish-born bishop in the Catholic Church. He is serving as the 1st Bishop of the Roman Catholic Diocese of Coari in the state of Amazonas, Brazil from 2013.

== Biography ==
Bishop, Marek Marian Piątek, C.Ss.R., a Polish native and a member of the Congregation of the Most Holy Redeemer (the Redemptorists), who led it beforehand as its Bishop Prelate while it was a Territorial Prelature. He was born on October 10, 1954, in the city of Tuchów, a part of the Roman Catholic Diocese of Tarnów, based in Tarnów. He made his first religious profession of vows (simple, or temporary, vows) in the Redemptorists on August 15, 1974. He studied the requisite undergraduate Philosophy and graduate Theology coursework at the local Redemptorist seminary. He obtained a Doctorate in Moral Theology from the Alphonsian Academy in Rome, Italy.

He was ordained to the Catholic priesthood on June 5, 1980, and six years later was sent as a missionary to Brazil, to the Roman Catholic Archdiocese of São Salvador da Bahia. He served as an instructor in Theology (1987-1990), and as a Professor of Moral Theology at the Catholic University of São Salvador da Bahia, in the São Bento and the Higher Institute for the Study of Marriage and the Family. From 2000 to 2010, he was a Pastor of a Parish in Salvador.

On June 15, 2011, he was appointed Bishop Prelate of the then-Territorial Prelature of Coari by Pope Emeritus Benedict XVI, receiving episcopal ordination on August 12, 2011.
