= Territorial Prelature of Lábrea =

Catholic particular church territory

Territorial Prelature of Lábrea Praelatura Territorialis Labreana

Catholic

Location
- Country: Brazil
- Ecclesiastical province: Porto Velho

Statistics
- Area: 230,240 km^{2} (88,900 sq mi)
- Population: Total; Catholics: (as of 2004); 78,832; 61,500 (78.0%)

Information
- Rite: Latin Rite
- Established: 1 May 1925 (101 years ago)
- Cathedral: Catedral Prelatícia Nossa Senhora de Nazaré

Current leadership
- Pope: Leo XIV
- Bishop: Santiago Sánchez Sebastián, O.A.R. (he was chosen by Pope Francis on Wednesday, 13 April 2016, to succeed Bishop Jesús Moraza Ruiz de Azúa, O.A.R.)
- Metropolitan Archbishop: Roque Paloschi
- Bishops emeritus: Jesús Moraza Ruiz de Azúa el, O.A.R.

The Territorial Prelature of Lábrea (Latin: Praelatura Territorialis Labreana) is a territorial prelature located in the city of Lábrea in the ecclesiastical province of Porto Velho in Brazil.

== History ==
- 1 May 1925: Established as Territorial Prelature of Lábrea from the Diocese of Amazonas

== Leadership ==
- Bishops of Lábrea (Roman rite), in reverse chronological order
  - Bishop Santiago Sánchez Sebastián, O.A.R. (2016.04.13 - )
  - Bishop Jesús Moraza Ruiz de Azúa, O.A.R. (1994.01.12 – 2016.04.13)
  - Bishop Florentino Zabalza Iturri, O.A.R. (1971.06.07 – 1994.01.12)
  - Bishop Mário Roberto Emmett Anglim, C.Ss.R. (Apostolic Administrator 1970.05.02 – 1971.06.07)
  - Bishop José del Perpetuo Socorro Alvarez Mácua, O.A.R. (1944 – 1967.11.30)
  - Fr. Inácio Martinez (1930.06.13 – 1942)
  - Fr. Marcelo Calvo (Apostolic Administrator 1925 – 1930)
