= Carillo Gritti =

Italian bishop

Carillo Gritti I.M.C.
- Prelate of Itacoatiara
- Church: Catholic Church
- See: Territorial Prelature of Itacoatiara
- In office: 5 January 2000 – 9 June 2016
- Predecessor: Jorge Eduardo Marskell
- Successor: José Ionilton Lisboa de Oliveira

Orders
- Ordination: 24 June 1967
- Consecration: 19 March 2000 by Alfio Rapisarda

Personal details
- Born: 12 May 1942 Martinengo, Province of Bergamo, Kingdom of Italy
- Died: 9 June 2016 (aged 74)

Carillo Gritti (12 May 1942 – 9 June 2016) was a Roman Catholic bishop.

Ordained to the priesthood in 1967, Gritti served as bishop of the Territorial Prelature of Itacoatiara, Amazonas, Brazil, from 2000 until his death in 2016.
