= Diocese of Alto Solimões =

Catholic ecclesiastical territory

Coordinates: 4.2291°S 69.9381°W

Diocese of Alto Solimões Dioecesis Solimões Superioris

Catholic

Location
- Country: Brazil
- Ecclesiastical province: Manaus

Statistics
- Area: 130,240 km^{2} (50,290 sq mi)
- Population: Total; Catholics: (as of 2004); 169,000; 98,000 (58.0%)

Information
- Sui iuris church: Latin Church
- Rite: Roman Rite
- Established: 23 May 1910 (116 years ago)
- Cathedral: Catedral Santos Anjos da Guarda, Tabatinga
- Co-cathedral: Co-Catedral São Paulo Apóstolo, São Paulo de Olivença

Current leadership
- Pope: Leo XIV
- Bishop: Adolfo Zon Pereira
- Metropolitan Archbishop: Sérgio Eduardo Castriani

The Roman Catholic Diocese of Alto Solimões (Latin: Dioecesis Solimões Superioris) is a diocese located in the city of Tabatinga in the ecclesiastical province of Manaus in Brazil.

== History ==
- May 23, 1910: Established as Apostolic Prefecture of Alto Solimões from the Diocese of Amazonas
- August 11, 1950: Promoted as Territorial Prelature of Alto Solimões
- August 14, 1991: Promoted as Diocese of Alto Solimões

== Bishops ==
- Prefects apostolic of Alto Solimões (Latin Church)
  - Evangelista Galea (6 Sep 1910 – 1938)
  - Tomaz M. de Marcellano (1938 – 1945)
  - Venceslao da Spoleto (8 Nov 1946 – 1950)
  - Wesceslau Nazareno Ponte de Spoleto (Apostolic Administrator 4 Sep 1950 – 1952)
- Prelates of Alto Solimões (Latin Church)
  - Wesceslau Nazareno Ponte de Spoleto (1952 – 1952)
  - Cesário Alexandre Minali (1 Mar 1955 – 9 Apr 1958), appointed Prelate of Carolina, Maranhão
  - Adalberto Domingos Marzi (Apostolic administrator 8 Apr 1959 – 4 Feb 1961)
  - Adalberto Domingos Marzi (4 Feb 1961 – 12 Sep 1990)
- Bishops of Alto Solimões (Latin Church)
  - Evangelista Alcimar Caldas Magalhães (12 Sep 1990 – 20 May 2015)
  - Adolfo Zon Pereira, S.X. (20 May 2015 – present)

=== Coadjutor bishop ===
- Adolfo Zon Pereira, S.X. (2014-2015)
