= Metropolitan cathedral =

A metropolitan cathedral is a cathedral to which other cathedrals in a province are suffragan. See metropolitan bishop.

Metropolitan cathedral may refer to:

== Asia ==
- Our Lady of Lourdes Metropolitan Cathedral, Thrissur, India
- Cebu Metropolitan Cathedral, Philippines
- Jaro Cathedral or Jaro Metropolitan Cathedral, Iloilo City, Philippines
- Palo Metropolitan Cathedral, Philippines
- Metropolitan Cathedral of San Fernando (Pampanga), City of San Fernando, Pampanga, Philippines
- Metropolitan Cathedral of the Immaculate Conception (Zamboanga), Philippines
- The Minor Basilica and the Metropolitan Cathedral of the Immaculate Conception, Intramuros, Manila, Philippines
- St. Mary's Metropolitan Cathedral, Changanassery, Changnacherry, Kerala, India
- Davao Cathedral or the Metropolitan Cathedral of San Pedro, Davao City, Philippines

== Europe ==
- Liverpool Metropolitan Cathedral, England
- Metropolitan Cathedral of Athens, Greece
- Metropolitan Cathedral of Saint Paul, Mdina, Malta

== North America ==
- Cathedral of Sts. Vladimir and Olga, a cathedral in Manitoba, Canada
- Metropolitan Cathedral of San José, Costa Rica
- San Salvador Metropolitan Cathedral, El Salvador
- Metropolital Cathedral of Guatemala, Guatemala City
- Mexico City Metropolitan Cathedral
- Immaculate Conception Cathedral, Managua (Catedral Metropolitana de la Inmaculada Concepción de María), Managua, Nicaragua
- Catedral Metropolitana Basílica de San Juan Bautista (San Juan, Puerto Rico), San Juan, Puerto Rico

== South America ==
- Buenos Aires Metropolitan Cathedral, Argentina
- Metropolitan Cathedral of Saint Sebastian, Cochabamba, Bolivia
- Cathedral of Brasília, Brasília, Brazil, (officially Metropolitan Cathedral of Brasília)
- Metropolitan Cathedral of Our Lady of the Conception, Manaus, Brazil
- Santiago Metropolitan Cathedral, Chile
- Metropolitan Cathedral of Medellín, Colombia (largest cathedral in South America)
- Metropolitan Cathedral of Quito, Ecuador
- Montevideo Metropolitan Cathedral, Uruguay
