= Diocese of Coari =

Catholic ecclesiastical territory

Coordinates: 4°05′S 63°08′W

Diocese of Coari Diocesis Coaritana

Catholic
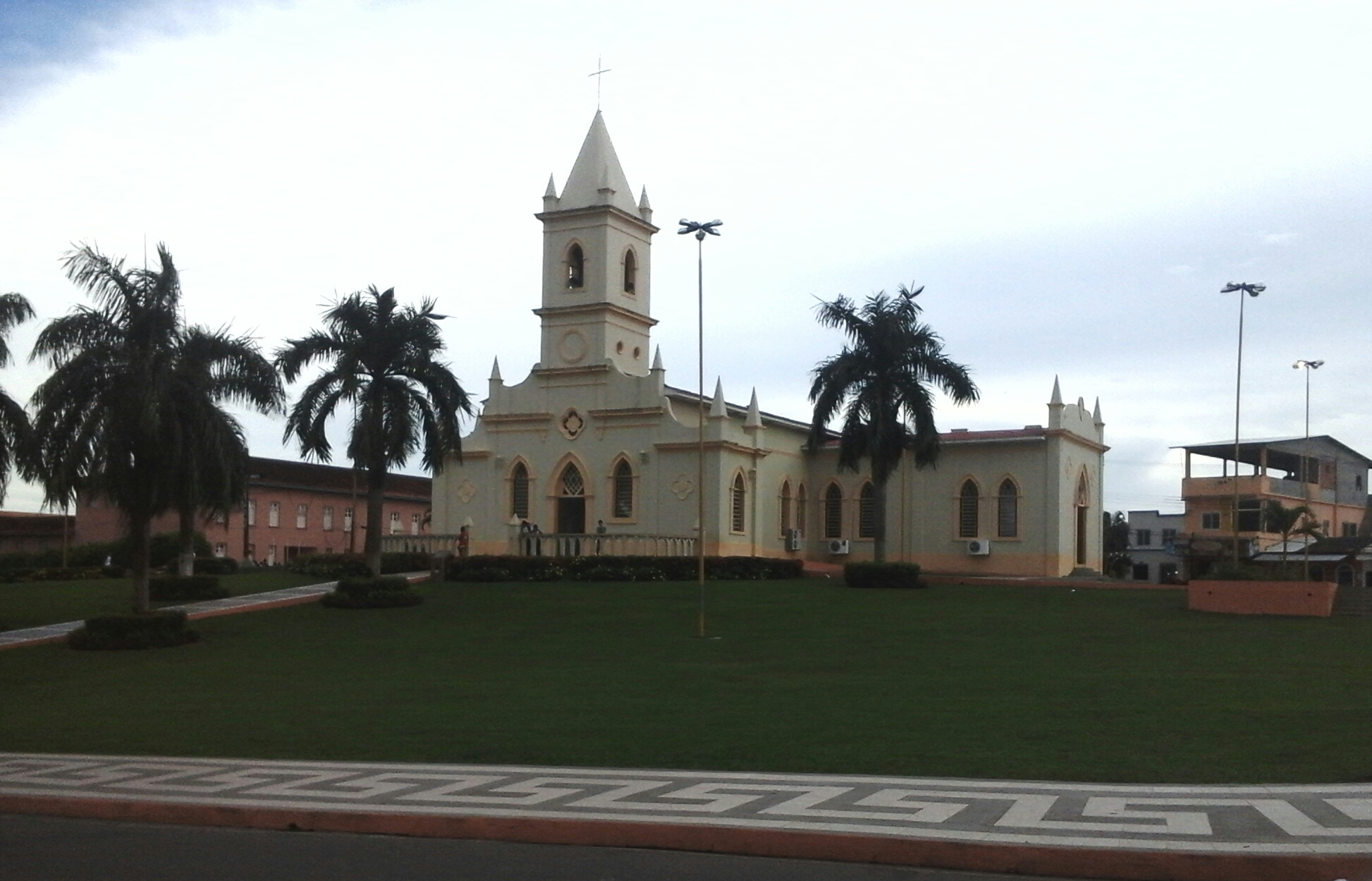
- Catedral Sant’Ana e São Sebastião in 2014

Location
- Country: Brazil
- Ecclesiastical province: Manaus

Statistics
- Area: 135,442 km^{2} (52,294 sq mi)
- Population: Total; Catholics: (as of 2004); 195,306; 166,076 (85.0%)

Information
- Sui iuris church: Latin Church
- Rite: Roman Rite
- Established: 9 October 2013 (13 years ago)
- Cathedral: Catedral Sant’Ana e São Sebastião

Current leadership
- Pope: Leo XIV
- Bishop: Marek Marian Piatek, C.Ss.R.
- Bishops emeritus: Gutemberg Freire Régis, C.Ss.R. Joércio Gonçalves Pereira, C.Ss.R.

The Roman Catholic Diocese of Coari (Latin: Dioecesis Coaritana) is a diocese located in the city of Coari in the ecclesiastical province of Manaus in Brazil.

The Roman Catholic Diocese of Coari was erected on 9 October 2013 by Pope Francis, and is a part of the Ecclesiastical Province of the Roman Catholic Archdiocese of Manaus, based in Manaus, Brazil.

It has been led since its elevation by its first bishop, Marek Marian Piatek, C.Ss.R., a Polish native and a member of the Congregation of the Most Holy Redeemer (the Redemptorists).

== History ==
- July 13, 1963, the Territorial Prelature of Coari was established from the Metropolitan Archdiocese of Manaus.
- October 9, 2013: Promoted as Diocese of Coari

== Bishops ==
=== Ordinaries, in reverse chronological order ===
- Prelates of Coari (Latin Church)
  - Mário Roberto Emmett Anglim, C.Ss.R. (April 24, 1964 – April 13, 1973)
  - Gutemberg Freire Régis, C.Ss.R. (July 23, 1978 – February 28, 2007)
  - Joércio Gonçalves Pereira, C.Ss.R. (coadjutor 2005–2007; bishop February 28, 2007 – July 22, 2009)
  - Marek Marian Piatek, C.Ss.R. (August 12, 2011 – October 9, 2013)
- Bishops of Coari
  - Marek Marian Piatek, C.Ss.R. (October 9, 2013–present)
