= Diocese of Parintins =

Catholic ecclesiastical territory

Diocese of Parintins Dioecesis Parintinensis

Catholic
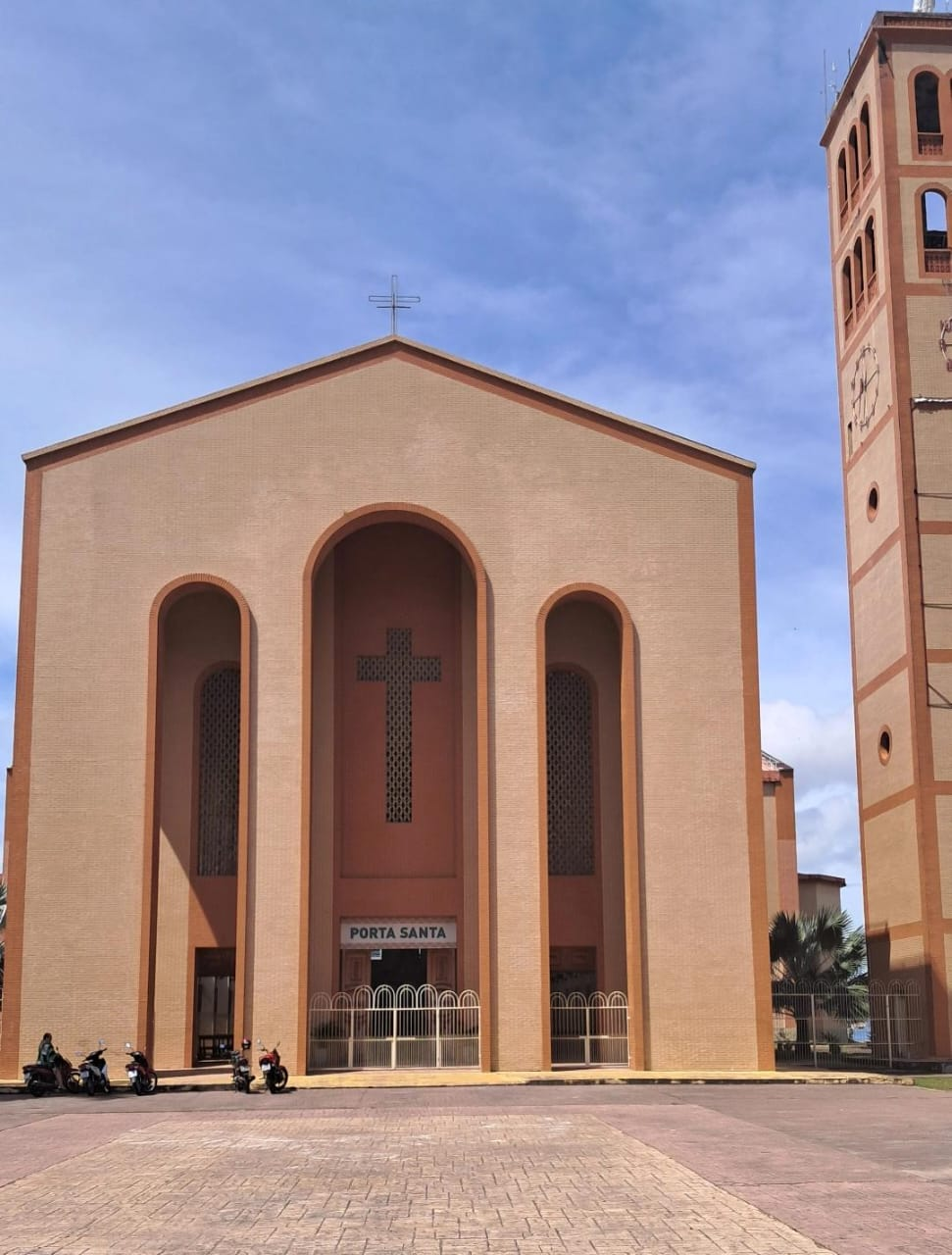

Location
- Country: Brazil
- Ecclesiastical province: Manaus

Statistics
- Area: 75,654 km^{2} (29,210 sq mi)
- Population: Total; Catholics: (as of 2004); 195,600; 170,000 (86.9%)

Information
- Denomination: Catholic Church
- Rite: Latin Rite
- Established: 12 July 1955 (71 years ago)
- Cathedral: Catedral Nossa Senhora do Carmo

Current leadership
- Pope: Leo XIV
- Bishop: José Albuquerque de Araújo
- Metropolitan Archbishop: Leonardo Ulrich Steiner, O.F.M.
- Bishops emeritus: Giuliano Frigeni, P.I.M.E.

The Roman Catholic Diocese of Parintins (Latin: Dioecesis Parintinensis) is a diocese located in the city of Parintins in the ecclesiastical province of Manaus in Brazil.

== History ==
- July 12, 1955: Established as Territorial Prelature of Parintins from the Metropolitan Archdiocese of Manaus
- October 30, 1980: Promoted as Diocese of Parintins

== Bishops ==
=== Ordinaries, in reverse chronological order ===
- Bishops of Parintins (Roman rite), below
  - Bishop José Albuquerque de Araújo (21 December 2022 – Present)
  - Bishop Giuliano Frigeni, P.I.M.E. (20 January 1999 – 21 December 2022), retired
  - Bishop Gino Malvestio, P.I.M.E. (9 March 1994 – 7 September 1997)
  - Bishop Giovanni Risatti, P.I.M.E. (15 July 1989 – 20 January 1993), appointed Bishop of Macapá, Amapa
  - Bishop Arcângelo Cerqua, P.I.M.E. (30 October 1980 – 15 July 1989), resigned
- Prelates of Parintins (Roman Rite), below
  - Bishop Arcângelo Cerqua, P.I.M.E. (4 February 1961 – 30 October 1980)
  - Fr. Arcângelo Cerqua, P.I.M.E. (later Bishop) (Apostolic Administrator 15 March 1956 – 4 February 1961)

=== Coadjutor bishop ===
- Giovanni (João) Risatti, P.I.M.E. (1987-1988)
