= José Song Sui-Wan =

Chinese-Brazilian Bishop

José Song Sui-Wan (SDB)
- Bishop of Roman Catholic Diocese of São Gabriel da Cachoeira
- Coat of arms of José Song Sui Wan
- Church: Roman Catholic Church
- See: Roman Catholic Diocese of São Gabriel da Cachoeira
- In office: 2002–2009
- Predecessor: Walter Ivan de Azevedo

Orders
- Ordination: July 17, 1971
- Consecration: April 27, 2002 by Walter Ivan de Azevedo, S.D.B.

Personal details
- Born: May 16, 1941 Shanghai
- Died: November 15, 2012 (aged 71) Campinas

José Song Sui-Wan (traditional Chinese: 宋瑞雲; simplified Chinese: 宋瑞云; pinyin: Sòng Ruìyún; Jyutping: sung3 seoi6 wan4), SDB (May 16, 1941 – November 15, 2012) was the Roman Catholic bishop of the Roman Catholic Diocese of São Gabriel da Cachoeira, Brazil.

Born in Shanghai, China and he moved to Brazil as an adolescent after spending time in Hong Kong (1949–1959).

Song was ordained to the priesthood as salesian in 1971 and was named bishop in 2002; he resigned in 2009 and died in 2012.

== Motto ==
VIDIMUS STELLAM EIUS IN ORIENTE (We saw His star in Orient)
