= Archdiocese of Manaus =

Catholic ecclesiastical territory

Coordinates: 3°07′S 60°01′W

Archdiocese of Manaus Archidioecesis Manaënsis

Catholic
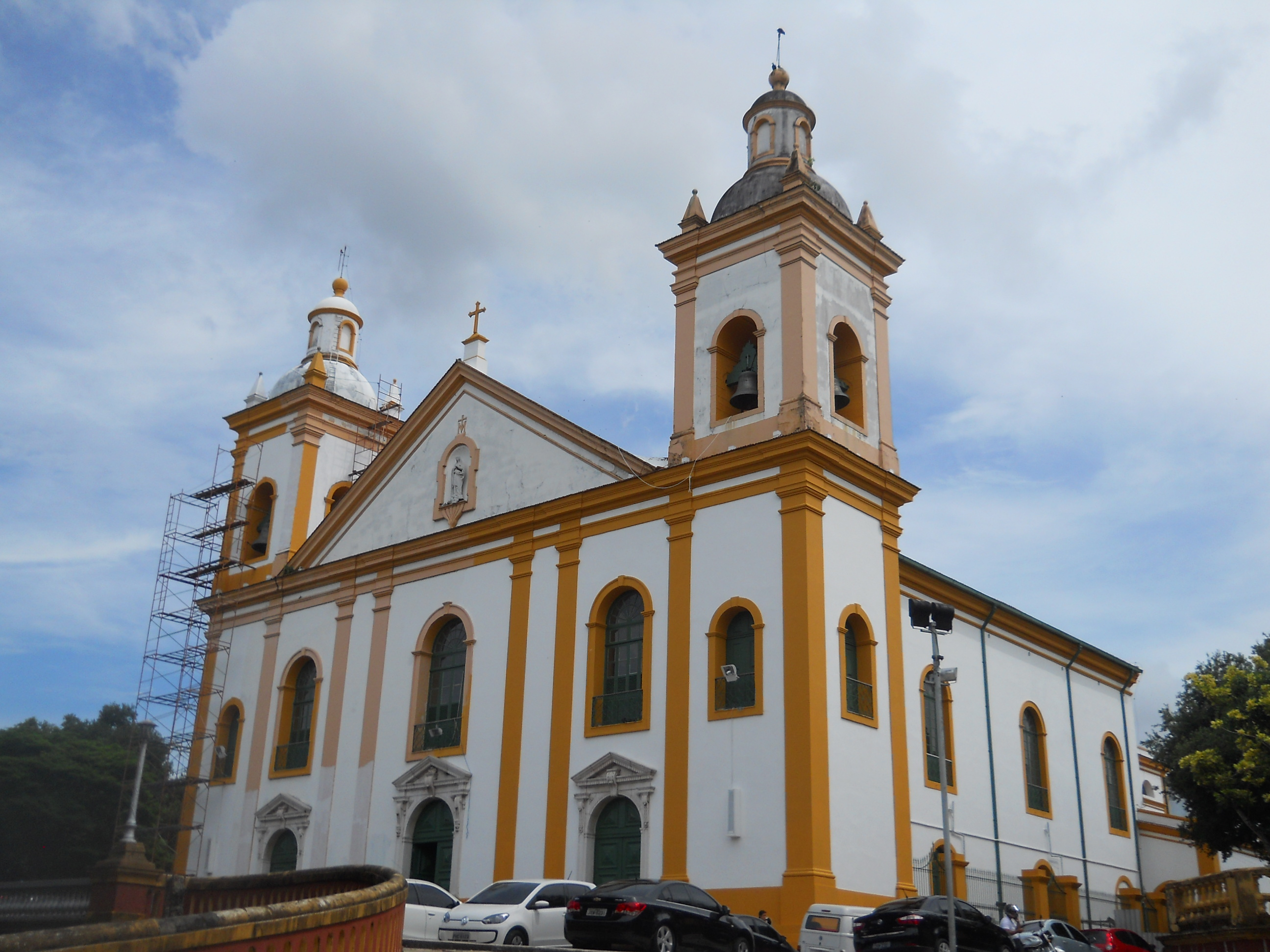
- Metropolitan Cathedral of Our Lady of the Conception, Manaus

- Coat of arms

Location
- Country: Brazil

Statistics
- Area: 65,146 km^{2} (25,153 sq mi)
- Population: Total; Catholics: (as of 2004); 1,405,835; 1,200,000 (85.4%)

Information
- Rite: Latin Rite
- Established: 27 April 1892 (134 years ago)
- Cathedral: Catedral Metropolitana Nossa Senhora da Conceição

Current leadership
- Pope: Leo XIV
- Bishop: Leonardo Ulrich Steiner
- Auxiliary Bishops: José Albuquerque de Araújo; Edmilson Tadeu Canavarros dos Santos
- Bishops emeritus: Luiz Soares Vieira; Mário Pasqualotto

Website
- https://arquidiocesedemanaus.org.br/

The Archdiocese of Manaus (Latin: Archidioecesis Manaënsis) is an archdiocese located in the city of Manaus in Brazil.

== History ==
- April 27, 1892: Established as the Diocese of Amazonas from the Diocese of Belém do Pará
- February 16, 1952: Promoted as the Metropolitan Archdiocese of Manaus

== Bishops ==
=== Ordinaries, in reverse chronological order ===
Archbishops of Manaus

- Leonardo Ulrich Steiner, O.F.M. (2019.12.27 – present)
- Sergio Eduardo Castriani (2012.12.12 - 2019.11.27)
- Luiz Soares Vieira (1991.11.13 – 2012.12.12)
- Clóvis Frainer, O.F.M. Cap. (1985.01.05 – 1991.05.22), appointed Archbishop of Juiz de Fora, Minas Gerais
- Milton Corrêa Pereira (1981.03.05 – 1984.05.23)
- Milton Corrêa Pereira (Apostolic Administrator 1980.04.21 – 1981.03.05)
- João de Souza Lima (1958.01.16 – 1980.04.21)
- Alberto Gaudêncio Ramos (1952.02.16 – 1957.05.09), appointed Archbishop of Belém do Pará

Bishops of Amazonas

- Alberto Gaudêncio Ramos (later Archbishop)(1948.08.30 – 1952.02.16)
- José da Matha de Andrade y Amaral (1941.05.12 – 1948.03.20), appointed Bishop of Niterói (Nictheroy)
- Basilio Manuel Olimpo Pereira, O.F.M. (1925.05.01 – 1941.03.22)
- José Maria Perreira Lara (1924.03.27 – 1924.12.18), appointed Bishop of Santos, São Paulo
- João Irineu Joffily (1916.05.04 – 1924.03.27), appointed Archbishop of Belém do Pará
- Frederico Benício de Souza e Costa (1907.01.08 – 1914.04.16)
- José Lourenço da Costa Aguiar (1894.01.16 – 1905.06.05)

=== Coadjutor archbishop ===
- Milton Corrêa Pereira (1973–1981)

=== Auxiliary bishops ===
- Jacson Damasceno Rodrigues, C.SS.R. (1996–1998)
- Mário Pasqualotto, P.I.M.E. (1999–2013)
- Sebastião Bandeira Coêlho (2004–2010), appointed Coadjutor Bishop of Coroatá, Maranhão
- Mário Antônio da Silva (2010–2016), appointed Bishop of Roraima, Roraima
- José Albuquerque de Araújo (2016-
- Edmilson Tadeu Canavarros dos Santos, S.D.B. (2016-

== Suffragan dioceses ==
- Diocese of Alto Solimões
- Diocese of Borba
- Diocese of Coari
- Territorial Prelature of Itacoatiara
- Diocese of Parintins
- Diocese of Roraima
- Diocese of São Gabriel da Cachoeira
- Territorial Prelature of Tefé

== See also ==
- Church of Saint Sebastian

== Sources ==
- GCatholic.org
- Catholic Hierarchy
- Archdiocese website (Portuguese)
