= Onofre (name) =

Onofre is both a given name and surname. Notable people with the name include:

== Given name ==
- Adel Onofre Yzquierdo Rodríguez (born 1945), Cuban politician and engineer
- Benedito Onofre Bezerra Leonel (1930–2011), Brazilian Army officer
- José Onofre Pizarro Caravantes (1953–2017), Chilean writer
- Onofre Ametller, Spanish educator
- Onofre Anacleto de Souza (1931–1997), Brazilian footballer
- Onofre Abellanosa (1913–1974), Filipino writer
- Onofre Agostini (born 1940), Brazilian politician
- Onofre Alsamora Peracaula (1825–1880), Spanish painter
- Onofre Aluísio Batista (1956–2009), Brazilian footballer
- Onofre Betbeder (1862–1914), Argentine Navy officer
- Onofre Cabell (died 1618), Spanish musician and theologian
- Onofre Cândido Rosa (1924–2009), Brazilian catholic bishop
- Onofre Corpuz (1926–2013), Filipino academic, economist and historian
- Onofre d'Alentorn i d'Oms (died 1606), Spanish soldier
- Onofre d'Alentorn i de Botella, Spanish politician and diplomat
- Onofre de Reart (1551–1622), Spanish religious leader
- Onofre Ferragut (1550–1605), Spanish notary and writer
- Onofre Ferreira dos Anjos (born 1926), Brazilian painter
- Onofre Ferreira de Castro (1932–1995), Brazilian physician
- Onofre Ferreira do Prado (born 1946), Brazilian writer
- Onofre de Copons i de Vilafranca (died 1552), Spanish politician
- Onofre de Rocabertí (1483–?), Catalan nobleman
- Onofre Gómez Portugal (1780–1811), Mexican soldier
- Onofre Gomis, Spanish politician
- Onofre Guinovart Escriva (1638–1718), Spanish organist and composer
- Onofre Jarpa (1849–1940), Chilean landscape painter
- Onofre Jaume de Coanegra, Spanish exile
- Onofre Jaume Novellas (1787–1849), Spanish mathematician and astronomer
- Onofre Larumbe (1881–1942), Spanish priest
- Onofre Lourenço de Paiva de Andrade (1805–1888), Portuguese Army officer
- Onofre Lovero (1925–2012), Argentine actor
- Onofre Manescal, Spanish historian and professor
- Onofre Marimón (1923–1954), Argentine racing driver
- Onofre Mata y Maneja (1850–1921), Spanish Army officer
- Onofre Mejía (born 1986), Ecuadorian footballer
- Onofre R. Pagsanghan (born 1927), Filipino teacher, playwright and stage director
- Onofre Reichardt Grüll (1914–2004), Spanish missionary
- Onofre Parés (1891–?), Spanish writer
- Onofre Pelechá, Spanish presbyter and astronomer
- Onofre Peñalva Donat (1701–?), Spanish composer
- Onofre Pinto (1937–1974), Brazilian guerrilla
- Onofre Pires (1799–1844), Brazilian soldier
- Onofre Pomar (died 1930), Spanish luthier and merchant
- Onofre Pons Sureda (born 1956), Spanish physician and politician
- Onofre Pratdesaba (1733–1810), Catalan jesuit and writer
- Onofre Quinan (1926–1998), Brazilian politician
- Onofre Ramírez (born 1960), Nicaraguan boxer
- Onofre Rodrigues Corrêa (born 1949), Brazilian politician
- Onofre Tolosa Alsina (1880–1936), Spanish teacher
- Onofre Vaquer i Bennàssar (born 1948), Spanish historian
- Onofre Vicente Escrivá de Híjar (1638–1688), Spanish scholar and writer
- Pedro Onofre Cotto (1669–1724), Spanish painter
- Renato Onofre Pinto Aleixo (1890–1963), Brazilian soldier and politician

== Surname ==
- Alberto Onofre (1947–2025), Mexican footballer
- Andréa Onofre de Araújo (born 1979), Spanish botanist
- Antonio Onofre da Silveira (1915–1988), Brazilian journalist
- Chestyn Onofre (born 1991), Honduran footballer
- Eduardo Onofre (born 1972), Mexican footballer
- Joan Onofre d'Ortodó (died 1616), Spanish notary
- João Onofre (born 1976), Portuguese visual artist
- José Onofre Bunster (1861–1926), Spanish politician
- Marta Onofre (born 1991), Portuguese pole vaulter
- Martí Onofre I de Rocabertí (1512–1567), Spanish noble
- Palmirinha Onofre (1931–2023), Brazilian cook and television presenter
- Rogelio Onofre (1938–2025), Filipino sprinter
- Sergio Onofre Jarpa (1921–2020), Chilean politician
- Thiago Gagliasso Onofre Ferreira (born 1989), Brazilian actor and politician
- Vicente Onofre Vázquez (born 1969), Spanish politician
- Waldir Onofre (1934–2015), Brazilian actor

== See also ==
- Onofre, genus of Brazilian jumping spiders
