= Abellanosa =

Abellanosa is a surname. Notable people with the surname include:

- Onofre Abellanosa (1913–1974), Filipino writer
- Ramón D. Abellanosa (1907–1983), Filipino journalist and writer
- Rodrigo Abellanosa (born 1961), Filipino politician
- Victorino A. Abellanosa (1903–1968), Filipino writer
- Darlygie F. Abellanosa (1993-Present), PH CPA
