= Diocese of Naviraí =

Catholic ecclesiastical territory

Diocese of Naviraí Dioecesis Naviraiensis Diocese de Naviraí
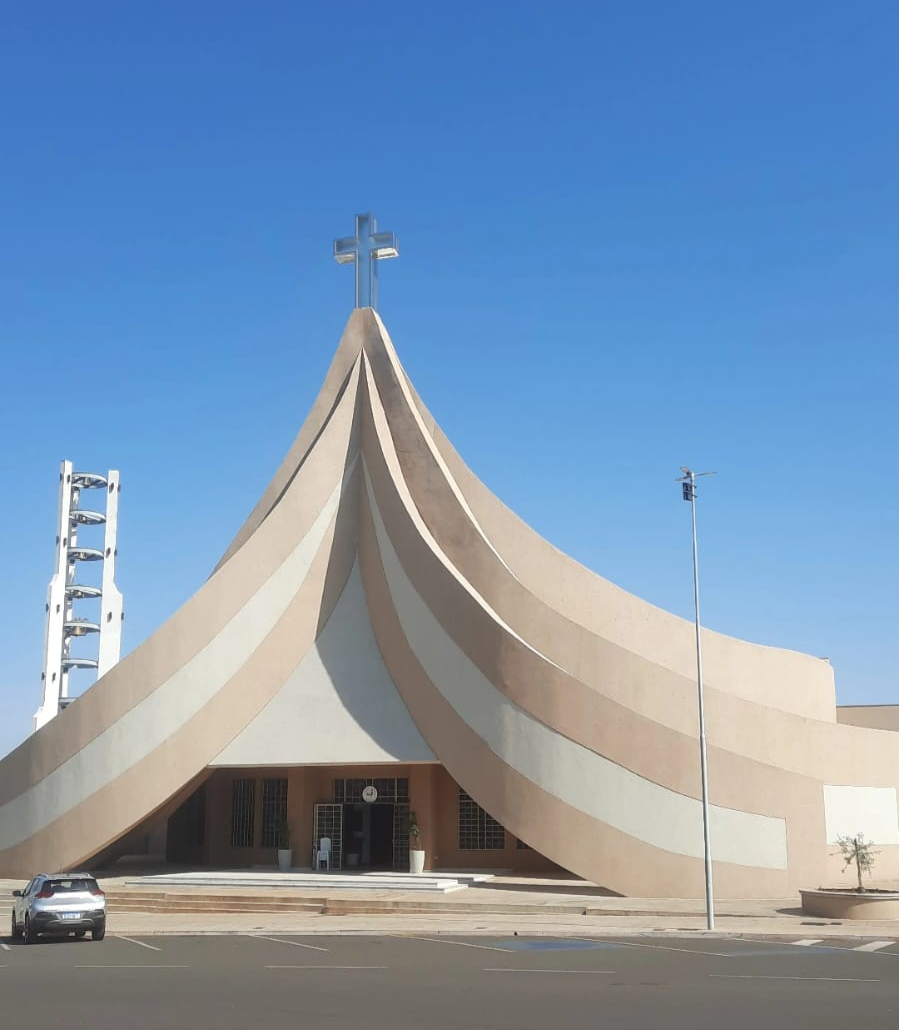

Location
- Country: Brazil
- Ecclesiastical province: Campo Grande
- Metropolitan: Campo Grande

Statistics
- Area: 35,138 km^{2} (13,567 sq mi)
- Population: Total; Catholics: (as of 2012); 291,598; 198,286 (68%)
- Parishes: 20

Information
- Rite: Latin Rite
- Established: 1 June 2011 (15 years ago)
- Cathedral: Catedral Nossa Senhora de Fátima

Current leadership
- Pope: Leo XIV
- Bishop: Ettore Dotti
- Metropolitan Archbishop: Dimas Lara Barbosa

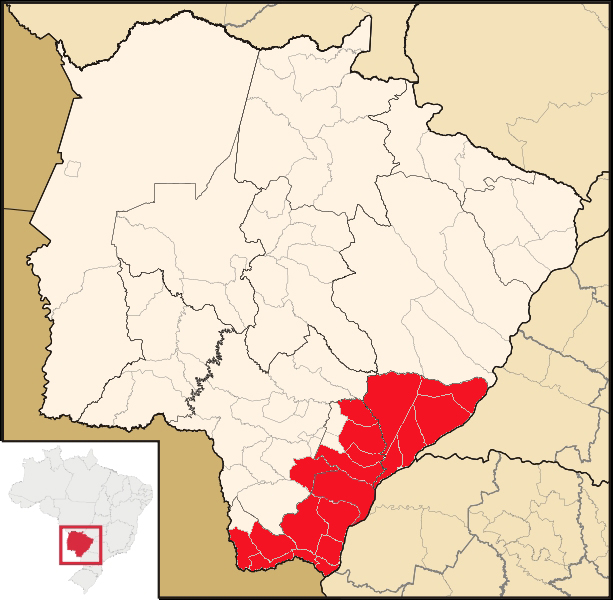
A map of the diocese (alone in the state of Mato Grosso do Sul).

The Roman Catholic Diocese of Naviraí is a diocese located in the city of Naviraí in the ecclesiastical province of Campo Grande in Brazil.

== History ==
- 1 June 2011: Established as Diocese of Naviraí from Diocese of Dourados

== Bishops ==
- Ettore Dotti, C.S.F. (1 June 2011 – present)
