= Diocese of Corumbá =

Latin Catholic jurisdiction in Brazil

Coordinates: 18.9988°S 57.6508°W

Diocese of Corumbá Dioecesis Corumbensis Diocese de Corumbá

Location
- Country: Brazil
- Ecclesiastical province: Campo Grande

Statistics
- Area: 62,890 km^{2} (24,280 sq mi)
- Population: Total; Catholics: (as of 2006); 105,300; 87,100 (82.7%)

Information
- Denomination: Catholic Church
- Sui iuris church: Latin Church
- Rite: Roman Rite
- Established: 5 April 1910 (116 years ago)
- Cathedral: Our Lady of Candelaria Cathedral in Corumbá

Current leadership
- Pope: Leo XIV
- Bishop: João Aparecido Bergamasco, S.A.C.
- Metropolitan Archbishop: Dimas Lara Barbosa

The Diocese of Corumbá (Latin: Dioecesis Corumbensis) is a Latin Church ecclesiastical territory or diocese of the Catholic Church located in the city of Corumbá, Brazil. It is a suffragan in the ecclesiastical province of the metropolitan Archdiocese Campo Grande.

== History ==
- March 10, 1910: Established as the Diocese of Corumbá with territory from the Diocese of Cuiabá

== Bishops ==
- Bishops of Corumbá, in reverse chronological order
  - Bishop João Aparecido Bergamasco, S.A.C. (2018.12.19 - present)
  - Bishop Segismundo Martínez Álvarez, S.D.B. (2004.12.07 – 2018.12.19)
  - Bishop Mílton Antônio dos Santos, S.D.B. (2000.05.31 – 2003.06.04), appointed Coadjutor Archbishop of Cuiabá, Mato Grosso
  - Bishop José Alves da Costa D.C. (1991.05.08 – 1999.07.21)
  - Bishop Pedro Fré, C.Ss.R. (1985.10.28 – 1989.12.02), appointed Bishop of Barretos, São Paulo
  - Bishop Vitório Pavanello, S.D.B. (1981.11.26 – 1984.11.26), appointed Coadjutor Archbishop of Campo Grande, Mato Grosso do Sul
  - Bishop Onofre Cândido Rosa, S.D.B. (1978.07.05 – 1981.02.16), appointed Bishop of Jardim, Mato Grosso do Sul
  - Bishop Ladislau Paz, S.D.B. (1957.11.28 – 1978.07.05)
  - Bishop Orlando Chaves, S.D.B. (1948.02.29 – 1956.12.18), appointed Archbishop of Cuiabá, Mato Grosso
  - Bishop Vicente Maria Bartholomeu Priante, S.D.B. (1933.05.13 – 1944.12.04)
  - Bishop Antônio de Almeida Lustosa, S.D.B. (1928.12.17 – 1931.07.10), appointed Archbishop of Fortaleza, Ceara
  - Bishop José Maurício da Rocha (1919.03.10 – 1927.02.04), appointed Bishop of Bragança Paulista, São Paulo
  - Bishop Helvécio Gomes de Oliveira, S.D.B. (1918.02.15 – 1918.06.18), appointed Bishop of São Luís do Maranhão; future Archbishop
  - Bishop Cyrillo de Paula Freitas (1911.03.13 – 1918.02.08)

=== Coadjutor bishop ===
- Onofre Cândido Rosa, S.D.B. (1977-1978)

=== Auxiliary bishop ===
- Ladislau Paz, S.D.B. (1955-1957), appointed Bishop here
