= Santa Maria in Monticelli, Rome =

Church building in Rome, Italy

Santa Maria in Monticelli
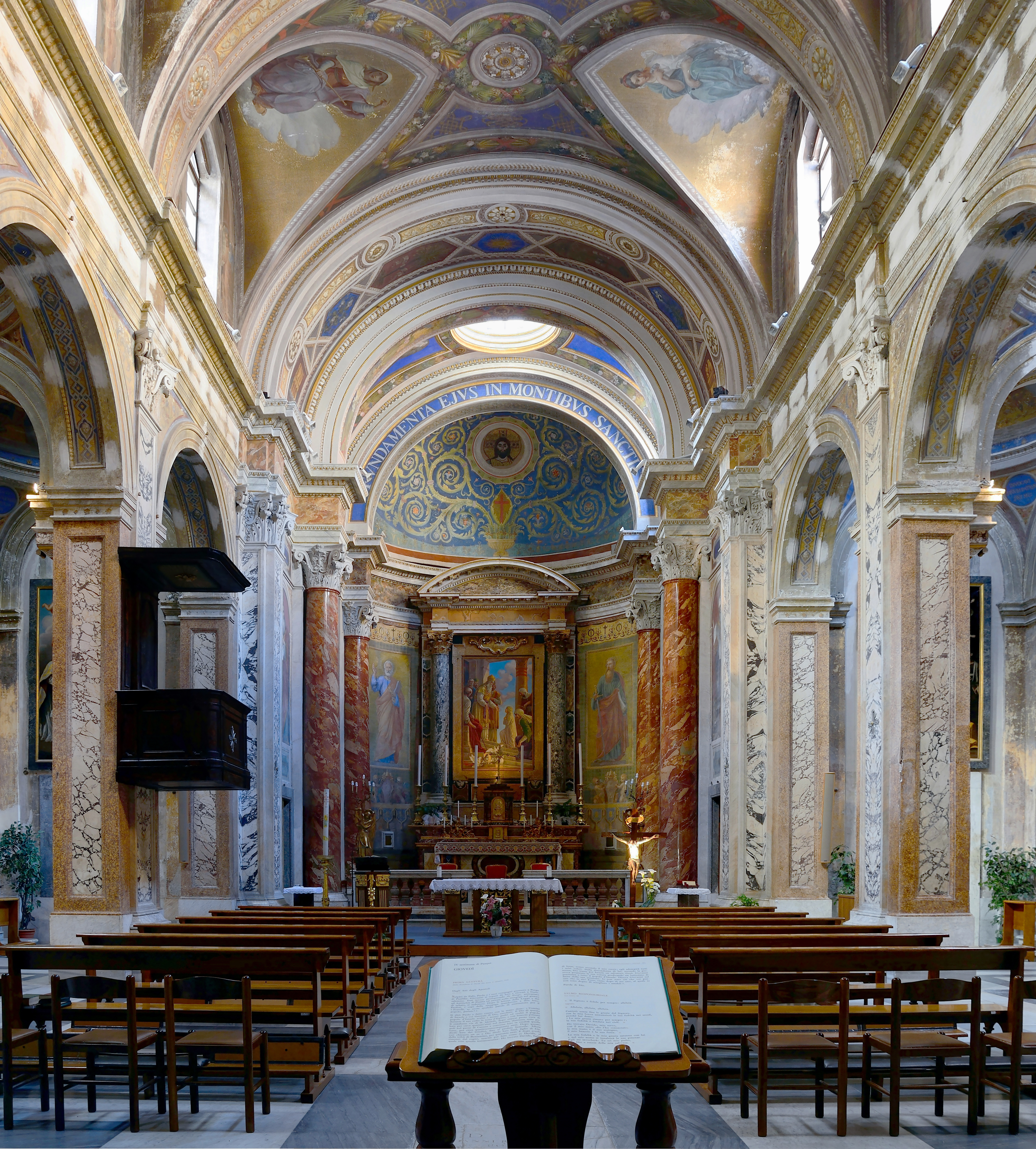
- Interior.
- Click on the map for a fullscreen view
- 41°53′35″N 12°28′27″E
- Location: Via di S. Paolo alla Regola, Rome
- Country: Italy
- Denomination: Roman Catholic

Architecture
- Architectural type: Church
- Groundbreaking: 12th century

Santa Maria in Monticelli is a church in the rione of Regola in Rome, sited on the street of the same name. A church was founded at the site in the 12th century and reconsecrated by Innocent II in 1143. It was known as Sancta Maria in Monticellis Arenulae de Urbe, in a bull by Urban IV in 1264. Little remains of the medieval church, except for the bell-tower. The church was entirely reconstructed in 1716 by Matteo Sassi, on a commission by Clement XI, and in 1860 by Francesco Azzurri. The church is the home to the Curia Generalizia dei Padri Dottrinari.

The church contains a baroque fresco of the Flagellation attributed to Antonio Carracci; a 13th-century painted wooden crucifix attributed to Pietro Cavallini; a Madonna and child with saints by Sebastiano Conca; and a Head of the Redeemer in mosaic fragments of the 12th century. Near the sanctuary of the church is the contemporary shrine of Blessed César de Bus, the French founder of the "Priests of Christian Doctrine" and the patron saint of catechists.

== Bibliography ==
- M. Armellini, Le chiese di Roma dal secolo IV al XIX, Roma 1891
- C. Hulsen, Le chiese di Roma nel Medio Evo, Firenze 1927
- F. Titi, Descrizione delle Pitture, Sculture e Architetture esposte in Roma, Roma 1763
