= Pedron =

Pedron or Pédron is a surname. Notable people with the name include:

- Bruno Pedron, Italian Roman Catholic prelate
- Eleonora Pedron, Italian model and actress
- Stéphane Pédron (born 1971), French football midfielder

== See also ==
- Pedron Niall, fictional character in The Wheel of Time
