= Antônio Possamai =

Brazilian Catholic bishop

Antônio Possamai SDB
- Bishop of Ji-Paraná
- Church: Catholic Church
- Diocese: Diocese of Ji-Paraná
- In office: 4 March 1983 – 11 April 2007
- Predecessor: José Martins da Silva
- Successor: Bruno Pedron

Orders
- Ordination: 8 December 1957
- Consecration: 15 May 1983 by Gregório Warmeling

Personal details
- Born: 5 April 1929 Ascurra, Santa Catarina, Republic of the United States of Brazil
- Died: 27 October 2018 (aged 89) Porto Velho, Rondônia, Brazil

Antônio Possamai S.D.B. (5 April 1929 – 27 October 2018) was a Brazilian Roman Catholic bishop.

Possamai was born in Brazil and was ordained to the priesthood in 1957. He served as bishop of the Roman Catholic Diocese of Ji-Paraná, Brazil, from 1983 to 2007.
