= Tuscilia gens =

Ancient Roman family

The gens Tuscilia was an obscure plebeian family at ancient Rome. Almost no members of this gens are mentioned by Roman writers, but several are known from inscriptions.

== Origin ==
The nomen Tuscilius belongs to a class of gentilicia originally formed from cognomina with the diminutive suffix -ulus. The surname Tusculus referred to an inhabitant of Tusculum, an ancient city of Latium.

== Members ==
This list includes abbreviated praenomina. For an explanation of this practice, see filiation.

- Tuscilius Naso, named in a sepulchral inscription from Rome, dating from the middle of the first century BC.
- Tuscilia Creste, named along with Lucius Tuscilius Synistor in an inscription from Casilinum in Campania, dating from the latter half of the first century BC, or the early first century AD.
- Lucius Tuscilius Synistor, named along with Tuscilia Creste in an inscription from Casilinum, dating from the latter half of the first century BC, or the early first century AD.
- Tuscilius, mentioned in a first- or second-century inscription from Trea in Picenum.
- Tuscilius Nominatus, an advocate paid by the people of Vicetia to appear in the Roman Senate to oppose the application of Sollers, an ex-praetor, to establish a market on his land in AD 105. The hearing was postponed, and when the matter resumed, Nominatus was absent. He later claimed to have abandoned the matter due to fear of reprisals. The senate concluded that his actions were wrong, but not fraudulent, and that he should refund the 2,500 denarii paid by the Vicentini to represent them in the matter. The emperor Trajan later granted the proceeds of Nominatus' estate to the people of Ricina in Picenum, to restore their streets and baths.
- Quintus Tuscilius L. f. Quintianus, a soldier in the eleventh urban cohort, buried at Vaga in Africa Proconsularis, aged twenty-three, in a tomb dating from the latter half of the second century, or the early part of the third.
- Titus Tuscilius Salvensis, a soldier in the fifth cohort of the vigiles at Rome in AD 205. He served in the century of Tauriscus.

=== Undated Tuscilii ===
- Tuscilia, named on a pottery stamp from Augustonemetum in Aquitania.
- Marcus Tuscilius M. f., a centurion in the tenth legion, (Note: The inscription does not indicate whether Tuscilius served in the Legio X Fretensis, or the Legio X Gemina.) buried at Firmum in Picenum.
- Publius Tuscilius Alexander, named in a sepulchral inscription from Rome.
- Tuscilia L. f. Libosa, buried at Thibilis in Numidia, along with Quintus Messius Rogatus, aged seventy-five, perhaps her husband.
- Tiberius Tuscilius Ti. l. Phileros, a freedman interred in an ossuary at Rome.
- Gaius Tuscilius Romanus, buried at Bononia in Cisalpine Gaul, aged thirty-five, with a monument from his wife, Helpis.
- Gaius Tuscilius Victor, buried at Regiae in Mauretania Caesariensis.

== See also ==
- List of Roman gentes

== Bibliography ==
- Gaius Plinius Caecilius Secundus (Pliny the Younger), Epistulae (Letters).
- Theodor Mommsen et alii, Corpus Inscriptionum Latinarum (The Body of Latin Inscriptions, abbreviated CIL), Berlin-Brandenburgische Akademie der Wissenschaften (1853–present).
- Charlton T. Lewis and Charles Short, A Latin Dictionary, Clarendon Press, Oxford (1879).
- René Cagnat et alii, L'Année épigraphique (The Year in Epigraphy, abbreviated AE), Presses Universitaires de France (1888–present).
- George Davis Chase, "The Origin of Roman Praenomina", in Harvard Studies in Classical Philology, vol. VIII, pp. 103–184 (1897).
- Paul von Rohden, Elimar Klebs, & Hermann Dessau, Prosopographia Imperii Romani (The Prosopography of the Roman Empire, abbreviated PIR), Berlin (1898).
- Stéphane Gsell, Inscriptions Latines de L'Algérie (Latin Inscriptions from Algeria, abbreviated ILAlg), Edouard Champion, Paris (1922–present).
- La Carte Archéologique de la Gaule (Archaeological Map of Gaul, abbreviated CAG), Académie des Inscriptions et Belles-Lettres (1931–present).
- Zeitschrift für Papyrologie und Epigraphik (Journal of Papyrology and Epigraphy, abbreviated ZPE).
