= Diocese of Jardim =

Catholic ecclesiastical territory

Coordinates: 21.4803°S 56.1562°W

Diocese of Jardim Dioecesis Viridariensis Diocese de Jardim

Location
- Country: Brazil
- Ecclesiastical province: Campo Grande
- Metropolitan: Campo Grande

Statistics
- Area: 69,972 km^{2} (27,016 sq mi)
- Population: Total; Catholics: (as of 2006); 365,000; 250,000 (68.5%)

Information
- Rite: Latin Rite
- Established: 30 January 1981 (44 years ago)
- Cathedral: Catedral Nossa Senhora de Fátima

Current leadership
- Pope: Leo XIV
- Bishop: Pedro Cesário Palma (nominee)
- Metropolitan Archbishop: Dimas Lara Barbosa

Website
- Website of the Diocese

The Roman Catholic Diocese of Jardim (Latin: Dioecesis Viridariensis) is a diocese located in the city of Jardim in the ecclesiastical province of Campo Grande in Brazil.

== History ==
- January 30, 1981: Established as Diocese of Jardim from the Diocese of Corumbá

== Bishops ==
- Bishops of Jardim (Roman rite), in reverse chronological order
  - Pedro Cesário Palma, O.F.M.Cap.(nominee) (2025-08-22)
  - Bishop João Gilberto de Moura (2013.09.29 - 30.10.2024)
  - Bishop Jorge Alves Bezerra, S.S.S. (2008.05.21 - 2012.11.07)
  - Bishop Bruno Pedron, S.D.B. (1999.08.04 – 2007.04.11)
  - Bishop Onofre Cândido Rosa, S.D.B. (1981.02.16 – 1999.08.04)

=== Coadjutor bishop ===
- Bruno Pedron, S.D.B. (1999)
