= Regiae =

Regiae may refer to:

- Regiae (also Regiæ), an Ancient city and former bishopric in Roman Mauretania (modern Algeria), now a Latin Catholic episcopal titular see
- Regiae, a proposed clade within the tropical pitcher plant genus Nepenthes
