= Janusz Marian Danecki =

Polish Roman Catholic bishop (1951–2024)

The Most Reverend Janusz Marian Danecki
- Auxiliary Bishop of Campo Grande
- Church: Roman Catholic Church
- Archdiocese: Campo Grande
- Appointed: 25 February 2015
- Term ended: 30 August 2024
- Other post: Titular Bishop of Regiae (2015–2024)

Orders
- Ordination: 19 June 1977
- Consecration: 1 May 2015 by Dom Dimas Lara Barbosa

Personal details
- Born: Janusz Marian Danecki; 8 September 1951 Sochaczew, Poland
- Died: 30 August 2024 (aged 72) Campo Grande, Mato Grosso do Sul, Brazil
- Denomination: Roman Catholic
- Motto: IN VERBO TUO SERVIAM
- Coat of arms

Styles of Janusz Marian Danecki
- Reference style: His Excellency; The Most Reverend
- Spoken style: Your Excellency
- Religious style: Bishop

The Most Reverend Dom Janusz Marian Danecki (8 September 1951 – 30 August 2024) was a Polish prelate, auxiliary bishop of the Roman Catholic Archdiocese of Campo Grande.

Danecki entered the Order of Friars Minor Conventual in 1971, formally professing his faith on 8 December 1975. He was ordained a priest on 19 June 1977. For eight years he exercised the priestly ministry in Poland, passing through several parishes and also in the Roman Catholic Archdiocese of Warsaw until 1984. On 14 April 1985, he was sent to the Mission of Saint Maximilian Maria Kolbe in Brazil, linked to the prelature of Tefé.

He also carried out parish activities in the Roman Catholic Archdiocese of Brasília and the Roman Catholic Diocese of Luziânia. On 25 February 2015, he was appointed auxiliary bishop of the Archdiocese of Campo Grande and titular bishop of Regiæ on 1 May. His consecration was by Dom Dimas Lara Barbosa, archbishop of Campo Grande, with his co-consecrators Dom Sérgio Eduardo Castriani, C.S.Sp., archbishop of Manaus and Dom João Casimiro Wilk, O.F.M. Conv., Bishop of Anápolis.

Danecki died in Campo Grande, Mato Grosso do Sul on 30 August 2024, at the age of 72.

Catholic Church titles
Preceded by —	Auxiliary Bishop of Campo Grande; 2015–2024	Succeeded by —
Preceded by Donald J. Hying	Titular Bishop of Regiae; 2015–2024	Succeeded by Vacant
