= Alberto Johannes Först =

German-born Brazilian Roman Catholic prelate

Alberto Johannes Först O.Carm.
- Bishop of Dourados
- Native name: Albert Johannes Först
- Church: Catholic Church
- Diocese: Diocese of Dourados
- In office: 12 May 1990 – 5 December 2001
- Predecessor: Theodard Leitz
- Successor: Redovino Rizzardo
- Previous post: Coadjutor Bishop of Dourados (1988-1990)

Orders
- Ordination: 29 June 1952
- Consecration: 7 September 1988 by Theodard Leitz

Personal details
- Born: 26 November 1926 Gunzendorf, Free State of Bavaria, German (Weimar) Republic
- Died: 1 November 2014 (aged 87)

Alberto Johannes Först (26 November 1926 – 1 November 2014) was a Catholic bishop.

Ordained to the priesthood on 29 June 1952, Först was named coadjutor bishop of the Diocese of Dourados, Brazil, on 6 July 1988, and was ordained bishop on 7 September 1988. He became diocesan bishop on 12 May 1990, and retired on 5 September 2001.
