= Diocese of Ji-Paraná =

Catholic ecclesiastical territory

Coordinates: 10.8821°S 61.9448°W

Diocese of Ji-Paraná Dioecesis Giparanensis

Catholic

Location
- Country: Brazil
- Ecclesiastical province: Porto Velho

Statistics
- Area: 120,000 km^{2} (46,000 sq mi)
- Population: Total; Catholics: (as of 2004); 709,938; 480,000 (67.6%)

Information
- Rite: Latin Rite
- Established: 3 January 1978 (48 years ago)
- Cathedral: Catedral São João Bosco

Current leadership
- Pope: Leo XIV
- Bishop: Norbert Hans Christoph Foerster, S.V.D.
- Metropolitan Archbishop: Roque Paloschi

Website
- www.diocesedejiparana.org.br

The Roman Catholic Diocese of Ji-Paraná (Latin: Dioecesis Giparanensis) is a diocese located in the city of Ji-Paraná in the ecclesiastical province of Porto Velho in Brazil.

== History ==
- 3 January 1978: Established as Territorial Prelature of Vila Rondônia from the Territorial Prelature of Guajará-Mirim and Territorial Prelature of Porto Velho
- 19 February 1983: Promoted as Diocese of Ji-Paraná
- 23 December 1997: Lost territory, along with Diocese of Diamantino, to establish Diocese of Juína

== Leadership, in the chronological order ==
- Prelate of Vila Rondônia (Roman Rite)
  - Bishop José Martins da Silva, S.D.N. (1978.01.03 – 1982.10.04), appointed Archbishop of Porto Velho, Rondonia
- Bishops of Ji-Paraná (Roman rite)
  - Bishop Antônio Possamai, S.D.B. (1983.03.04 – 2007.04.11)
  - Bishop Bruno Pedron, S.D.B. (2007.04.11 – 2019.06.05)
  - Bishop Norbert Hans Christoph Foerster, S.V.D. (2020.12.02 – present)
