= Sublime Massacre Corpóreo =

Studio album by Holocausto Canibal
- Released: January 2002
- Recorded: 2001, Grave Studios
- Genre: Goregrind, grindcore, death metal
- Length: 44:07
- Label: So Die Music
- Producer: Pedro Alves

Holocausto Canibal chronology
Gonorreia Visceral (2000)	Sublime Massacre Corpóreo (2002)	Opusgenitalia (2006)

Sublime Massacre Corpóreo (Portuguese for "Sublime Corporeal Massacre") is the sophomore studio album by Portuguese grindcore band Holocausto Canibal. It was released in January 2000 by So Die Music, who had previously released their debut opus Gonorreia Visceral. The album was recorded in 2001 at Grave Studios, in Braga, Portugal, and was produced by Pedro Alves.

This record became known in the Portuguese scene for songs as "Violada Pela Motosserra", "Porno Hardgore" and "Cadavérica Ejaculação Espasmódica" which became classics of the genre in their country and featured current Anathema keyboardist, Daniel Cardoso, on keyboards.

"Sublime Massacre Corpóreo" defined their sound and was their first record to cross the Portuguese border thanks to the wide distribution through Europe and North and South America. It was also this album that permitted Holocausto Canibal to go abroad, this time with C. Guerra as session vocalist, who entered the band following the departure of Ricardo S. in November 2003 who decided to dedicate his time to his newborn daughter.

It features four remixes by Portuguese electronic outfit Stealing Orchestra.

== Track listing ==
All music composed by Holocausto Canibal. All lyrics written by Z. Pedro.

No.	Title	Length
1.	"Psicótico Prelúdio (Psychoticum Prelude)"	01:52
2.	"Cadavérica Ejaculação Espasmódica (Cadaveric Spasm Ejaculation)"	02:10
3.	"Canzana Blenorrágica (Blenorrhagic Doggystyle Fuck)"	04:37
4.	"Necro-Felação (Necro-Cocksucker)"	01:03
5.	"Sádica Flagelação Hiperbólica (Sadistic Hyperbolic Flagellation)"	04:01
6.	"Micose Cotovelar (Elbow Micosis)"	01:10
7.	"Embrio Progéria (Embryo Progeria)"	01:57
8.	"Violada Pela Moto-Serra (Raped By The Chainsaw)"	04:05
9.	"Reinfecção Clitórica - Septicemia Vagi-Anal 2001 (Clitoral Reinfection - Vaginal Septicaemia 2001)"	01:34
10.	"Sufocada pelo Semen (Suffocated By Semen)"	03:24
11.	"Porno Hardgore (Porno Hardgore)"	01:28
12.	"Paradigmas Sub Cutâneos - Verborreicas Incursões pela Terminologia Forense (Subcutaneous Paradmigs - Loquacy Incursions By The Forensic Terminology)"	03:57
13.	"Purulento Climax Chill Out (Purulent Chill Out Climax)"	02:11
14.	"Necro-Felação Invertida (Inverted Necro-Cocksucker)"	01:35
15.	"Faixa 15 (Track 15)"	02:33
16.	"Your Mother Are My Dog! (Stealing Orchestra vs Holocausto Canibal)"	02:46
17.	"Zingayah! You Got the Bite! (Stealing Orchestra vs Holocausto Canibal)"	02:16
18.	"I Kick Ass for the Lord! (Stealing Orchestra vs Holocausto Canibal)"	00:13
19.	"What! No Pudding? (Stealing Orchestra vs Holocausto Canibal)"	01:15
Total length:		44:07

== Credits ==
Holocausto Canibal

- Ricardo Silva – vocals
- Nuno Pereira – guitar
- Jose Pedro – bass
- Ivan Saraiva – drums
- Daniel Cardoso – keyboards

Production

- Pedro Alves – sound engineering, producing, mixing, mastering
- Christophe Szpajdel – logo
