= Holocausto Canibal =

Portuguese goregrind band

- Origin: Porto, Portugal
- Genres: Goregrind, death metal
- Years active: 1997–present
- Label: Bizarre Leprous Production
- Members: Z. Pedro; Eduardo F. Diogo. P. António C. Ricardo S.
- Past members: J. Lamelas; Carlos; Nuno T. Nuno P. Ivan S. C. Guerra
- Website: https://www.facebook.com/hcgore

Holocausto Canibal (Portuguese for 'Cannibal Holocaust') is a Portuguese goregrind band based in Rio Tinto. Formed in 1997, the band has released one demo, six studio albums, three EPs, four splits, and a compilation album. They are considered one of the most well known Portuguese extreme metal acts today.

The band's sound is heavily influenced by artists including Carcass, Impetigo, Dead Infection, and Blood and Deranged. They fuse goregrind with some death metal elements, while the lyrics are mainly focused on gore, sexual perversion and paraphilias. The lyrics are written and sung in Portuguese.

== History ==
=== 1997–2002: Early days, first reactions and Gonorreia Visceral ===
Holocausto Canibal was established in the fall of 1997 by bassist Z. Pedro, who recruited vocalist Ricardo S., guitar player Nuno P. and drummer J. Lamelas, forming the first official line-up.

Holocausto Canibal logo, created by Christophe Szpajdel

Taking its name from Ruggero Deodato's cult horror movie Cannibal Holocaust, the band's logo was created by artist Christophe Szpajdel, who had previously designed the logos for Emperor and Arcturus, among other acts. By choosing this name the band intended to pay homage to the movie and its director, which were the main inspiration for their sound, aesthetics and live performances.

The first songs were created fast and Holocausto Canibal made their first live appearance on March 22, 1998, at the Discoteca Cairo in Porto.

After a short run of shows throughout the country, the band gathered to record their first and only demo, named "oPus I", which consisted of a rehearsal recording of the band's current set. Released in 1998, "oPus I" received good reviews from the local and national zines and rapidly marked Holocausto Canibal's place in the Portuguese scene.

In 1998, Z. Pedro and Nuno P. visited the Institute of Forensic Medicine in Porto for a photo session to be published in Loud! Magazine (Portugal's biggest metal magazine), where they met Prof. José Eduardo Pinto da Costa (a Portuguese doctor and professor in the field of forensics), a moment that crucially influenced the band's lyrical approach to gore and horror themes. The professor gave them an atlas of medicine that has been the main inspiration for their lyrics ever since. These have become known in Portugal for the use of technical terms and subjects and for their complexity.

One year later, vocalist Ricardo S. left and Carlos stepped in to handle all vocal duties, while the band entered the Rec'n'Gore Studios to record their first album. Entitled Gonorreia Visceral, it was released in February 2000 via So Die Music and consolidated the band's position in the scene, in a time when the black metal boom was taking place in Portugal and most Portuguese death metal and grindcore bands were waning, allowing them to play the biggest extreme music gatherings in Portugal.

Gonorreia Visceral was the first Portuguese album to feature gory artwork designed with true photos and not drawings. This would become a trademark of the band from that moment on since every subsequent artwork was conceived in a similar way.

Due to the violence of its artworks, lyrics and live performances (known for the use of surgical tools, chainsaws, blood and meat), Holocausto Canibal quickly started to grab the attention of the Portuguese media.

In February and April 2000, respectively, drummer J. Lamelas and vocalist Carlos abandoned and Ricardo S. was brought back to fill in the vocalist spot and found a new drummer, Ivan S.

Completed by bassist Z. Pedro and guitarist Nuno P., the band would cross their native country spreading their sound in infamous live performances.

=== 2002–06: Sublime Massacre Corpóreo and international exposure ===
However, international recognition only came with their second full-length, Sublime Massacre Corpóreo, released in 2002 through So Die Music.

In 2001 the band entered Grave Studios in Braga (Portugal) to record the album whose songs such as "Violada Pela Motosserra", "Porno Hardgore" and "Cadavérica Ejaculação Espasmódica" quickly became classics of the genre in the Portuguese scene and featured current Anathema keyboardist, Daniel Cardoso, on keyboards.

Sublime Massacre Corpóreo defined their sound and was their first record to cross the Portuguese border thanks to the wide distribution through Europe and North and South America. It was also this album that permitted Holocausto Canibal to go abroad, this time with C. Guerra as session vocalist, who entered the band following the departure of Ricardo S. in November 2003 who decided to dedicate his time to his newborn daughter.

April 2003 saw the arrival of guitarist Nuno T., who filled the spot of a second guitar and Holocausto Canibal became a five-piece for the first time but not for long, since he left the band in July 2004.

With this line-up the band played their first shows in Czech Republic and Germany in various venues and became the first Portuguese outfit to ever play in festivals such as Fuck The Commerce VII (2004) in Germany (which was their first show outside Portugal and Spain) and Obscene Extreme Fest (in 2005) in Czech Republic.

One year later, Holocausto Canibal signed a deal with German Cudgel Agency to record and release their third album, Opusgenitalia.

In December 2005, preparing this release and anticipating a long touring cycle, they added a new guitar player, Eduardo F., forming a quintet for the second time in the band's history. Once again this formation would not last due to Nuno P.'s departure in the end of 2006.

=== 2006–11: Opusgenitalia ===
Opusgenitalia was recorded by a line-up consisting of bassist Z. Pedro, guitarist Nuno P. and drummer Ivan S., but this time they called in Max T. to track vocals, an invitation that would be renewed in both Gorefilia and Larvas.

Although choosing once again the Grave Studios to record and mix this new opus, mastering duties were handled in Germany at the MegaWimp Studios.

After several delays due to the graphic nature of the artwork (that was constantly censored by German authorities), Opusgenitalia was finally released in 2006 and featured a more brutal, fast and intense songwriting, pushing the band's sound into a brand new level of aggressiveness and obscenity. Songs like "Fetofilia - Incestuosa Sodomia Fetal", "Vulva Rasgada", "Amizade Fálica" and "Empalada Via Espinal Dorsal - Empalamento II" would grow into marks of the genre in Portugal, just as had happened before with some of Sublime Massacre Corpóreo's tunes.

This album was massively distributed worldwide and presented the band to brand new audiences, allowing them to tour new countries as Slovakia, Hungary, Finland, Italy, Austria and in various festivals such as Antitrend Bizarre Leprous Fest 2, Fekal Party 9, Fuck The Commerce XI (this time as co-headliners), Deathfeast Open Air 2008, Tattoo Deathfest 2010, among others.

From April to June 2006 drummer Ivan S. was forced to take some time off the band to recover from a leg injury. Diogo P. (who at the time played drums in Fetal Incest, where Z. Pedro also performed bass duties) was called to fill in on drums in the shows that were confirmed in that period.

The first overseas appearance was about to happen in 2008, since the band was confirmed to play the Central Illinois Metalfest held in Illinois, USA on July 19, but due to a regression of Ivan S.' leg injury this incursion did not take place.

Ivan S. left the band in September 2009 and Diogo P. stepped in as the official drummer. At this time the official line-up consisted in Z. Pedro (bass - the only remaining founding member), C. Guerra (vocals), Eduardo F. (guitar) and Diogo P. (drums), and the band started to prepare their next full-length release.

In April 2011 guitarist António C. was added as a guest member to assist in their live shows.

Shortly after, the band was invited by Portuguese director Tiago Pereira to be a part of the "A Música Portuguesa A Gostar Dela Própria" (Portuguese for "The Portuguese Music Enjoying Itself") project, which consists in an online music video archive created by Tiago Pereira and Joana Barra Vaz to demonstrate the diversification of Portuguese music. The videos were shot outdoor in strange places, completely disconnected from the artists' sound. Holocausto Canibal was the first metal band to be featured in this project, participating with the song "Gorgasmos - Orgásmicos Espasmos Gore" from their first album.

=== 2011–14: Gorefilia ===
2011 was also the year that saw the band's return to the studio to record their new opus. Choosing 213 Studios and producer Bruno Silva to record and Hertz Studios in Poland with producers Slawek and Wojtek Wieslawski (known for their work with bands like Vader, Behemoth and Decapitated) to handle mixing and mastering duties, Gorefilia was released in 2012 through Xtreem Music (worldwide) and Raising Legends/Raging Planet Records (Portugal).

Gorefilia is known for being the band's most mature, complete and darker work, being described by them as a concept album involving sexual arousal and gratification towards sexual behavior that is atypical and extreme. It features contributions from notable musicians of the Portuguese scene, such as prominent rapper Fuse (Dealema), Portuguese gothic musician Charles Sangnoir (La Chanson Noire), Miguel Newton (from the Portuguese punk rock stars Mata-Ratos), and morbid novelist David Soares, among others.

The band's return to full-lengths six years after Opusgenitalia, Gorefilia was critically acclaimed, being highly recommended by Terrorizer ("A nasty helping of Portuguese gore Metal, anyone? Look no further than these mighty legends, brootal is an understatement!" they wrote) and gave them the opportunity to shoot their first ever music videos for the songs "Objectofilia Platónica" and "Lactofilia Destalhada".

The video for the first single, "Objectofilia Platónica", was premiered at the national TV show Curto Circuito on November 22, 2012.

A new touring cycle began right after Gorefilia's release in April 2012 at the Steel Warrior's Rebellion - Barroselas Metalfest XV, and a few weeks after vocalist C. Guerra left the band. Following this event, longtime vocalist Ricardo S. stepped in once more, this time as a session vocalist.

Having spent the whole year of 2012 touring Portugal, 2013 marked the return to the foreign stages, touring Spain, Czech Republic, Slovakia, Germany, Italy and Switzerland, playing festivals as the Obscene Extreme 2013 (Czech Republic), Extremefest 2013 (Germany), Carnage Feast 2013 (Switzerland) and Vulgar Fest VIII (Italy).

Holocausto Canibal on the Box Sized Die exhibition (2013)

Due to the exposure given to Gorefilia by media and fans, the band was invited by Portuguese sculptor João Onofre and contemporary art museum Fundação de Serralves' curator Isabel Braga to be a part of the "Box Sized DIE" exhibition that took place on November 30, 2013, and February 23, 2014, at the premises of the Palácio de Cristal, in Porto.

"Box Sized Die" is a 183 cm black metal cube padded with acoustic foam. Referencing a minimalist sculpture by Tony Smith, Onofre invited Holocausto Canibal to perform inside it, joining the ranks of Konkhra, Gorod, among other bands that were also part of this performance. The work has no fixed duration, instead the idea is that the band performs until they feel that the oxygen is running out. The performance ends when the band opens the box's door due to fear of asphyxiation.

The first performance was interrupted by the artist at the 27-minute mark fearing the band members were fainting, but set a new record since no other band had played for so long before. However, in the second performance Holocausto Canibal broke their own record and played non-stop for 35 minutes.

=== 2014–present ===
Gorefilia's promotion cycle ended in October 2013 and the band quickly focused on recording four new songs, once again dividing their time between 213 Studios with Bruno Silva for recording and Hertz Studios with Slawek and Wojtek Wieslawsky taking care of mix and mastering process.

With a contract signed with cult Czech label Bizarre Leprous Production, the band released the Larvas EP in May 2014 and started to prepare another extensive touring cycle in promoting to this new release. In that same month they toured the United Kingdom for the first time and after a few months they played South America for the first time in an extensive tour through Brazil.

Live activities did not cease and yet in 2014 they made their debut in the Netherlands, co-headlining the Grindfeast XL in Arnhem, a country they returned to in April 2015, to play the Neurotic Deathfest in Tilburg, the greatest indoor death metal and grindcore oriented festival in Europe, becoming the first Portuguese band to ever play it.

The band's next touring schedule included Germany's Party.San Festival 2015, Austria's Rape The Escape Festival 2015 and the Frankfurt Death Fest in 2016.

In an article featured on Portuguese Loud! magazine on the tenth anniversary of Sublime Massacre Corpóreo, Holocausto Canibal revealed their plans to re-record oPus I and Gonorreia Visceral as part of the 15th year celebration of the release of their first album. A few months later, in an interview on Larvas, they confirmed this intention and pointed out 2015 as the release date of this record, also revealing that they are already working on a new full-length.

A 7-inch split with Welsh death metal band Desecration was released in 2015, while in March of the same year it was known that they were working with Swedish producer and musician Dan Swanö for their new releases.

== Media exposure ==
Due to the brutality of their sound, lyrics and aesthetics, Holocausto Canibal has grabbed the attention of the Portuguese media since their early days, being featured in eight TV reports about extreme music, broadcast in prime time by ten different TV stations, which is a unique case concerning extreme bands in Portugal.

Their first TV appearance occurred in 1999 in a report about extreme music called "Sons Do Extremo", conducted by Portuguese journalist Margarida Marante in the "Esta Semana" TV show, broadcast in the SIC TV channel. The report featured an interview to Z. Pedro, J. Lamelas and Carlos and excerpts from a show on October 5, 1999, in Porto.

In the first edition of the Portuguese Big Brother reality show, aired in 2000, contestants were granted online access to purchase Christmas presents for their family and friends. One of the chosen gifts was a copy of Holocausto Canibal's first album Gonorreia Visceral and the act was immediately followed by a long conversation about the band and extreme music.

Later, around 2002, Z. Pedro was interviewed by Portuguese journalist Carlos Pinto Coelho for the Acontece TV show (broadcast in RTP 2, RTP África and RTP Internacional channels).

Some known Portuguese celebrities were also found talking or promoting the band in known TV shows, such as Portuguese writer José Luís Peixoto, who was interviewed in the "Câmara Clara" TV show (broadcast in RTP 2, RTP África and RTP Internacional channels) and recited a poem from Fernando Pessoa wearing a Holocausto Canibal T-shirt.

Holocausto Canibal was also the first metal band featured in the Aquário TV show (aired in the Porto Canal channel), in January 2009. The band was invited by host Sérgio Mourão to perform live a full set, which included the songs "Cadavérica Ejaculação Espasmódica", "Empalamento", "Punição Anal", "Fetofilia - Incestuosa Sodomia Fetal" and "Vulva Rasgada", among others.

The band was also mentioned and the inspiration for the sketch "Bichas Modernas - Manifestação Contra Concerto De Sizzla", featured on the Estado de Graça TV show (broadcast in April 2012 in the RTP 1 channel) and interpreted by Portuguese comedians Joaquim Monchique, Manuel Marques and Eduardo Madeira, which was later included in the DVD "Estado De Graça - Best Of, Vol. 1".

In 2011 the band was invited by Portuguese director Tiago Pereira to be a part of the "A Música Portuguesa A Gostar Dela Própria" (Portuguese for "The Portuguese Music Enjoying Itself") project, which consists in an online music video archive created by Tiago Pereira and Joana Barra Vaz to demonstrate the diversification of Portuguese music. The videos were shot outdoor in strange places, completely disconnected from the artists' sound. Holocausto Canibal was the first metal band to be featured in this project, participating with the song "Gorgasmos - Orgásmicos Espasmos Gore" from their first album and in February 2012 this song was shown in a report about this project in the "Telejornal" TV show (broadcast in the RTP 1 channel).

The video for the first single, "Objectofilia Platónica", was premiered at the national TV show Curto Circuito (broadcast in the SIC Radical channel) on November 22, 2012.

== Current lineup ==
- Jose Pedro - bass (1997–present)
- Diogo Pereira - drums (2009–present)
- Antonio Carvalho - guitar (2011–present)
- R. Orca - vocals (2017–present)

== Past members ==
- Joao Lamelas - drums (1997-2000)
- Nuno Pereira - guitar (1997-2003, 2004-2006, 2010)
- Ivan Saraiva - drums (1997-2009)
- Ricardo Silva - vocals (1997-1999, 2000-2003, 2012–2017)
- Carlos - vocals (1999-2000)
- Daniel Cardoso - keyboard (2002)
- Nuno Teixeira - guitar (2003-2004)
- Carlos Guerro - vocals (2003-2012)
- Max Tome - vocals (2005-2014)
- Eduardo Fernandez - guitar, vocals (2005-2018)

== Discography ==
Holocausto Canibal released six full-lengths, two EPs, three splits, one compilation, one demo and participated in numerous tribute albums released all over the world. Their releases were widely distributed through more than 14 different labels from countries such as Brazil, Colombia, Germany, Indonesia, Italy, Portugal, United States, Czech Republic, Slovakia, Mexico, Austria, among others.

The full-lengths are Gonorreia Visceral, Sublime Massacre Corpóreo, Opusgenitalia and Gorefilia, while Visceral Massacre Memorabilia was a compilation of the first two albums with previous unreleased material.

They released the Compêndio de Aversões tape EP consisting of previously unreleased covers, and Larvas, an EP containing four new songs, six live tracks recorded at the Obscene Extreme Fest 2013 and three remixes of songs from Gorefilia.

The band also released four splits, the first one being with Italian grinders Grimness 69 in 2003, and the second with Mixomatosis. The third split (with German Kadaverficker) was released exclusively at the Extremefest in 2013 and rapidly sold out. The fourth split was with Wales' Desecration.

Being very active in compilation appearances, Holocausto Canibal participated in numerous tributes to bands such as Dead Infection, Cock and Ball Torture and the Portuguese punk rock stars Mata-Ratos.

=== Studio albums ===
- Gonorreia Visceral (2000)
- Sublime Massacre Corpóreo (2002)
- Opusgenitalia (2006)
- Gorefilia (2012)
- Catalépsia Necrótica (2017)
- Crueza Ferina (2022)

=== Live albums ===
- No Sleep 'Til Trutnov - Live at Obscene Extreme (2016)
- Assintonia Hertziana (2019)

=== EPs and splits ===
- Libido Dispareunia (split CD with Grimness 69) (2003)
- Morbosa Carnosidade Putrefacta (split CD with Mixomatosis) (2005)
- Holocausto Canibal/Kadaverficker (7-inch split with Kadaverficker) (2013)
- Compêndio de Aversões (cassette EP) (2013)
- Larvas (CD EP) (2014)
- Intravisceral Exhibition (7-inch split with Desecration) (2015)

=== Compilations ===
- Visceral Massacre Memorabilia (2008)

=== Demos ===
- oPus I (tape) (1998)

=== DVD ===
- Obscene Extreme 2005 (Obscene Productions) (2005)
- Fekal Party 9 (L'Infantille Collective) (2011)

=== Other releases ===
- Promúsica #45 (compilation, Promúsica) (2000)
- Divergências (compilation, Independent Rec.) (2004)
- Obscene Extreme 2005 (compilation, Obscene Productions) (2005)
- Lithanies Of Purulent Death (compilation, Infernal Scum Recs.) (2006)
- Círculo De Fogo #4 - Melomania (compilation) (2008)
- Tribute To Porn (compilation, Idle Hands Destroy Lives) (2009)
- 100 Bands Who Do 10 Sec. Of Stuff On A 7-inch EP (compilation, N.H.D.I.Y.S.T. Records) (2010)
- Grind Your Fucking Face Off!!! (compilation, Idle Hands Destroy Lives) (2010)
- In Gore We Grind III - A Collection Of Killers (compilation, Bootleg Rec./Buried In Hell) (2010)
- Splatter Fetish II (compilation, Parkinson Wankfist Pleasures/Alarma Rec.) (2010)
- Covers, C* e Mamas: o Tributo Ideal - Mata-Ratos Tribute (Hellxis Records) (2010)
- Bulldozers United: A Tribute to C*ck And Ball Torture (Mierdas Prod.) (2011)
- Goth'n'Rock Productions: IV Chapter (Raising Legends Records) (2012)
- Obscene Extreme 2013 (compilation, Obscene Productions) (2013)
- Spanish (and guests) Tribute to Dead Infection (Base Records) (2014)
- 13 Metal Compilation Vol. III (2014)
- Tribute To Blood (2014)
- Decreto 3.927 (Raging Planet Records) (2014)
- Dead Infection and Friends: Mexican Tribute To The Gods Of Gore Grind (Gore Cannibal Records) (2015)
