= José Alves da Costa =

Brazilian prelate of the Catholic Church (1939–2012)

José Alves da Costa D.C. (April 20, 1939 – December 4, 2012) was a Brazilian prelate of the Catholic Church who was the bishop of the Diocese of Corumbá in Brazil.

Ordained to the priesthood in 1965, he was named bishop in 1986 and resigned in 1999.
