= Opusgenitalia =

Studio album by Holocausto Canibal
- Released: July 28, 2006
- Recorded: 2005, Grave Studios
- Genres: Goregrind, grindcore, death metal
- Length: 47:37
- Label: Cudgel Vertrieb
- Producer: Pedro Alves

Holocausto Canibal chronology
Sublime Massacre Corpóreo (2002)	Opusgenitalia (2006)	Gorefilia (2012)

Professional ratings
Review scores
Source	Rating
Rock Hard	4/10

Opusgenitalia is the third studio album by Portuguese grindcore band Holocausto Canibal. It was recorded in 2005 at Grave Studios Studios, in Braga, Portugal, being produced and mixed by Pedro Alves (who previously produced "Sublime Massacre Corpóreo"), while mastering duties were handled at MegaWimp Studios in Germany and released in 2006 through German Cudgel Vertrieb.

After several delays due to the graphic nature of the artwork (that was constantly censored by German authorities), "Opusgenitalia" was finally released in 2006 and featured a more brutal, fast and intense songwriting, pushing the band's sound into a brand new level of brutality and obscenity. Songs like "Fetofilia - Incestuosa Sodomia Fetal", "Vulva Rasgada", "Amizade Fálica" and "Empalada Via Espinal Dorsal - Empalamento II" would grow into marks of the genre in Portugal, just as had happened before with some of "Sublime Massacre Corpóreo"'s tunes.

Just like their previous opus, the band included three electronic tracks: "Analéptica Anergia Sideroblástica - GHB Fx" (Analeptic Sideroblastic Anergy - GHB Fx), "Apraxia Digital Com Cyber Leucorreia Hi-Tech" (Digital Apraxy With Hi-Tech Cyber Leukhorrhea) and "Neuro Discrasia Sináptica - Interferências no Núcleo Tegmental Pedunculopontino" (Synaptic Neuro Discrasy - Pedunculpontine Tegmental Nucleus Interferences).

The track presented as "Tema Oculto" (Occult Song) is a cover from Carcass's "Reek Of Putrefaction".

== Track listing ==
All music composed by Holocausto Canibal. All lyrics written by Z. Pedro. "Analéptica Anergia Sideroblástica - GHB Fx (Analeptic Sideroblastic Anergy - GHB Fx)" and "Apraxia Digital Com Cyber Leucorreia Hi-Tech" (Digital Apraxy With Hi-Tech Cyber Leukhorrhea) remixes by Fabrice Costeira and "Neuro Discrasia Sináptica - Interferências no Núcleo Tegmental Pedunculopontino (Synaptic Neuro Discrasy - Pedunculpontine Tegmental Nucleus Interferences)" remix by M1R.

No.	Title	Length
1.	"Vulva Rasgada (Shattered Vulvae)"	01:19
2.	"Punição Anal (Anal Punishment)"	02:42
3.	"Fetofilia - Incestuosa Sodomia Fetal (Foetophily - Incestuous Fetal Sodomy)"	02:13
4.	"Onanismo Ápode (Limbless Apode Onanism)"	02:59
5.	"Prenha de um Canídeo (Pregnant From A Dog)"	02:15
6.	"Fornicada pelo Bisturi (Fucked With A Scalpel)"	02:16
7.	"Origami Uterino - Forma de Remoção de um Útero Via Esofagal (Uterine Origami - How To Remove An Uterus Through The Esophagus)"	03:37
8.	"Possuída pelo Grind (Possessed By Grind)"	01:02
9.	"Oclusão Intestinal (Intestinal Oclusion)"	03:10
10.	"Amizade Fálica (Phallic Friendship)"	03:11
11.	"Esganada Via Cordão Umbilical (Strangled By The Umbilical Chord)"	05:02
12.	"Coprofágico Fondue Escatofágico (Coprophagic Scatophagic Fondue)"	01:16
13.	"Acupunctura Genital (Genital Acupuncture)"	01:45
14.	"Empalada na Espinal Dorsal - Empalamento II (Impaled On The Dorsal Spine - Impalement II)"	01:27
15.	"Analéptica Anergia Sideroblástica - GHB Fx (Analeptic Sideroblastic Anergy - GHB Fx)"	02:20
16.	"Apraxia Digital Com Cyber Leucorreia Hi-Tech (Digital Apraxy With Hi-Tech Cyber Leukhorrhea)"	01:26
17.	"Neuro Discrasia Sináptica - Interferências no Núcleo Tegmental Pedunculopontino (Synaptic Neuro Discrasy - Pedunculpontine Tegmental Nucleus Interferences)"	04:17
18.	"Tema Oculto (Occult Song)"	05:20
Total length:		44:37

== Credits ==
=== Holocausto Canibal ===
- Carlos Guerro – vocals
- Nuno Pereira – guitar
- Eduardo Fernandes – guitar, vocals
- Jose Pedro – bass
- Ivan Saraiva – drums

=== Additional personnel ===
- Christophe Szpajdel – logo
