= Betbeder Islands =

Island group in Wilhelm Archipelago, Antarctica

- Location within Antarctica

Geography
- Location: Antarctica
- Coordinates: 65°15′S 65°3′W
- Archipelago: Wilhelm Archipelago

Administration
- Administered under the Antarctic Treaty System

Demographics
- Population: Uninhabited

The Betbeder Islands are a group of small islands and rocks in the southwest part of the Wilhelm Archipelago, 41 km (22 nmi) west of Cape Tuxen. They were discovered by the French Antarctic Expedition, 1903–05, and named by Jean-Baptiste Charcot for Rear Admiral Onofre Betbeder, Argentine Navy.

== See also ==
- List of Antarctic and sub-Antarctic islands
