= Diocese of Dourados =

Latin Catholic jurisdiction in Brazil

Coordinates: 22.2285°S 54.8104°W

Diocese of Dourados Dioecesis Auratopolitanus Diocese de Dourados

Location
- Country: Brazil
- Ecclesiastical province: Campo Grande

Statistics
- Area: 68,300 km^{2} (26,400 sq mi)
- Population: Total; Catholics: (as of 2011); 485,927; 353,000 (72.6%)

Information
- Denomination: Catholic Church
- Sui iuris church: Latin Church
- Rite: Roman Rite
- Established: 15 June 1957 (68 years ago)
- Cathedral: Catedral Nossa Senhora da Conceição

Current leadership
- Pope: Leo XIV
- Bishop: Henrique Aparecido de Lima, C.SS.R.
- Metropolitan Archbishop: Dimas Lara Barbosa
- Bishops emeritus: Alberto Johannes Först, O.Carm.

Website
- www.diocesededourados.com.br

The Diocese of Dourados (Latin: Dioecesis Auratopolitanus) is a Latin Church ecclesiastical territory or diocese of the Catholic Church located in the city of Dourados, Brazil. It is a suffragan in the ecclesiastical province of the metropolitan Archdiocese of Campo Grande.

== History ==
- June 15, 1957: Established as Diocese of Dourados from the Diocese of Corumbá

== Bishops ==
- Bishops of Dourados, in reverse chronological order
  - Bishop Henrique Aparecido de Lima, C.SS.R. (2015.10.21 -
  - Bishop Redovino Rizzardo, C.S. (2001.12.05 – 2015.10.21)
  - Bishop Alberto Johannes Först, O. Carm. (1990.05.12 – 2001.12.05)
  - Bishop Teodardo Leitz, O.F.M. (1970.11.27 – 1990.05.12)
  - Bishop Carlos Schmitt, O.F.M. (1960.08.29 – 1970.02.14)
  - Bishop José de Aquino Pereira (1958.01.23 – 1960.03.26), appointed Bishop of Presidente Prudente, São Paulo

=== Coadjutor bishops ===
- Alberto Johannes Först, O. Carm. (1988-1990)
- Redovino Rizzardo, C.S. (2001)
