= Metropolitan Cathedral of Our Lady of the Abbey and St. Anthony, Campo Grande =

Metropolitan Cathedral of Our Lady of the Abbey and St. Anthony
- Catedral Metropolitana Nossa Senhora da Abadia e Santo Antônio
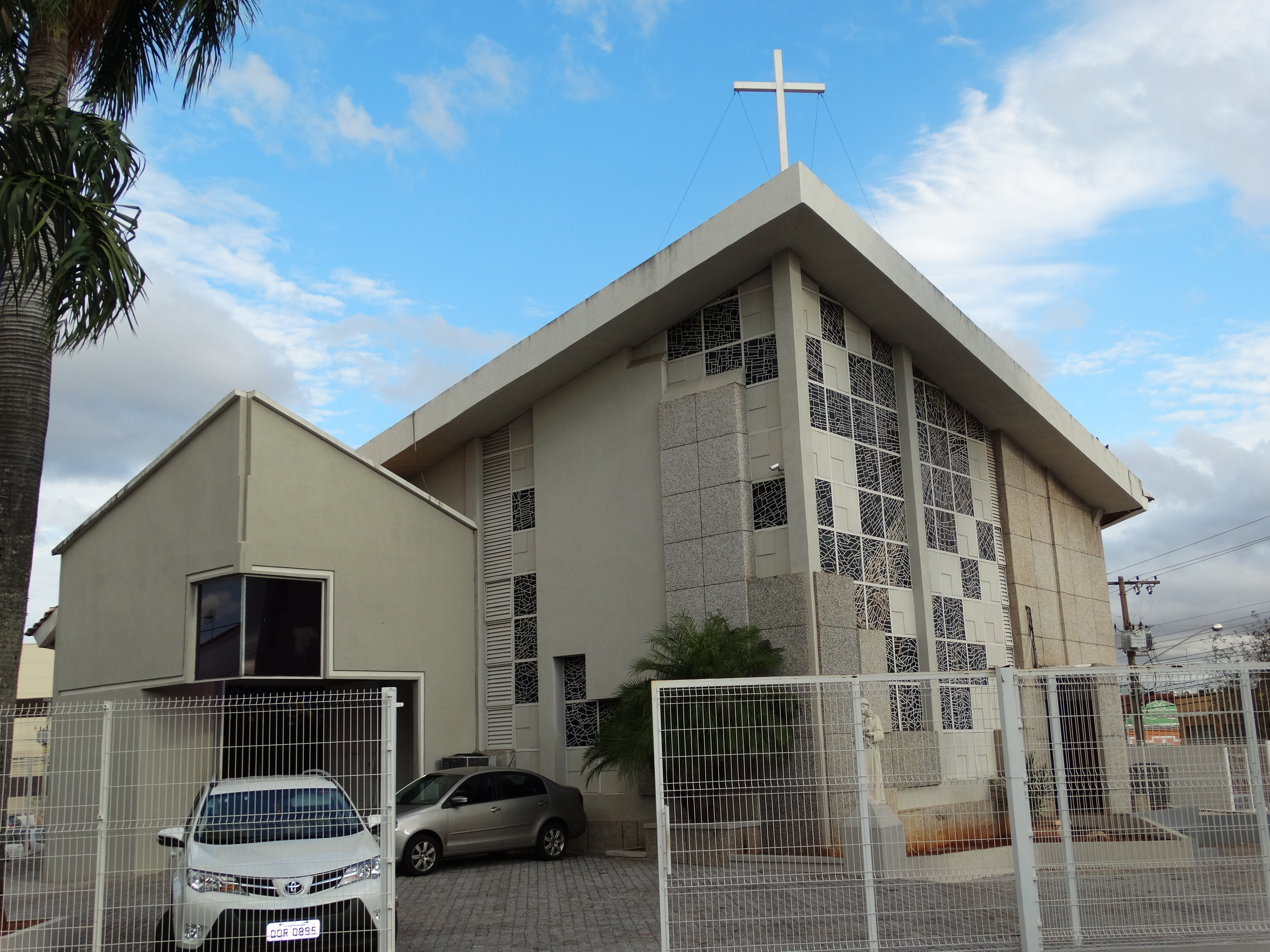
- Metropolitan Cathedral of Our Lady of the Abbey and St. Anthony
- 20°28′S 54°37′W
- Location: Campo Grande
- Country: Brazil
- Denomination: Roman Catholic Church

Administration
- Archdiocese: Campo Grande

The Metropolitan Cathedral of Our Lady of the Abbey and St. Anthony (Portuguese: Catedral Metropolitana Nossa Senhora da Abadia e Santo Antônio) Also Campo Grande Cathedral It is a Catholic cathedral that functions as the headquarters of the Archdiocese of Campo Grande in the South American country of Brazil. It is also the Parish Church of San Antonio, created on April 7, 1912.

San Antonio is the pattern of the city of Campo Grande. It is said that the founder of the city, Jose Antonio Pereira, was a devotee of the saint and during his trip from Minas Gerais to the camp, passed by Santana de Parnaíba, who was molested by a "malignant fever." As a practicing José Antonio took care of the population in the city and made a promise that if there were no mortal victims, would raise a church in honor of the saint. It became a cathedral in 1991.

== See also ==
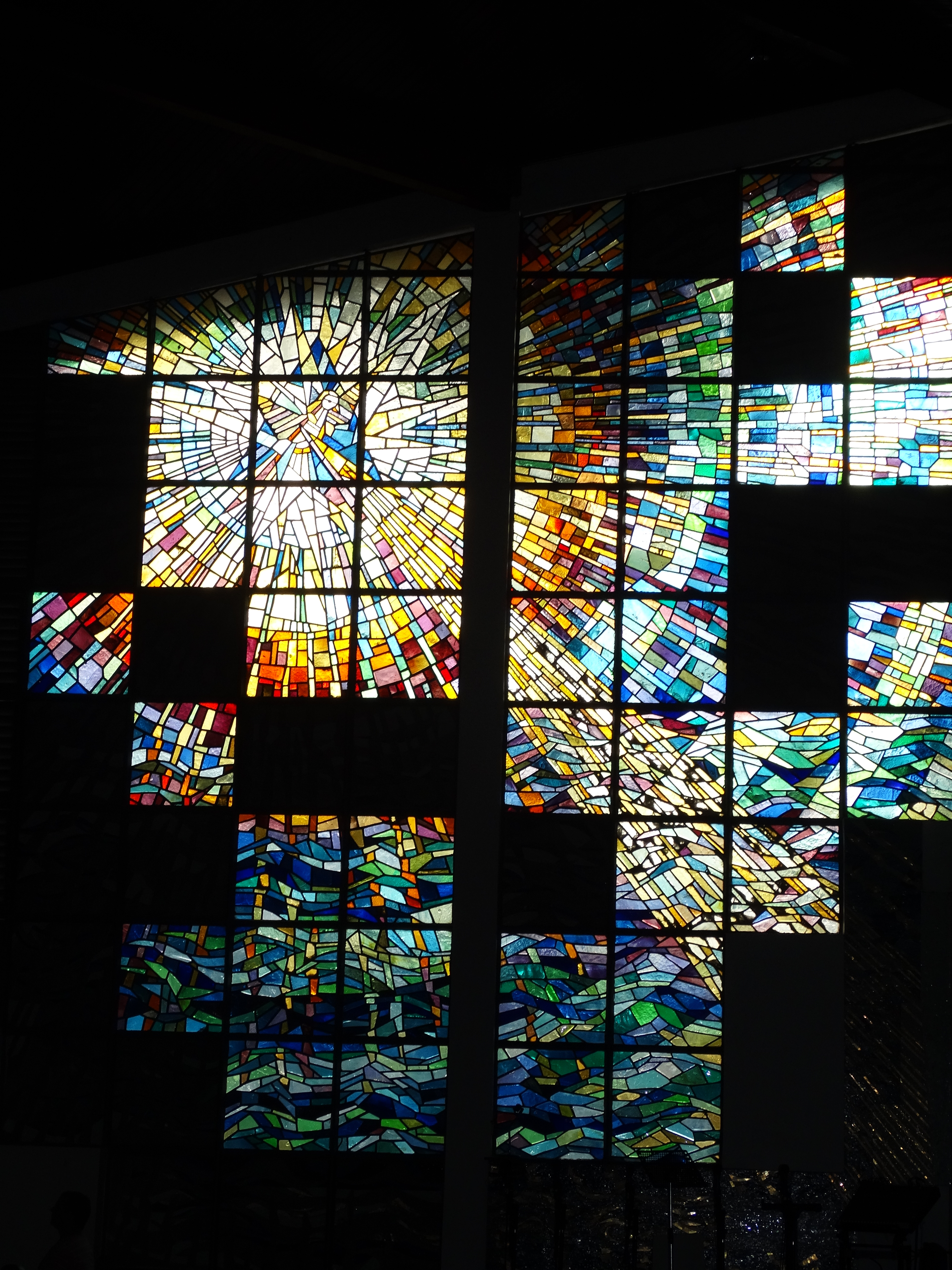
Internal view

- List of cathedrals in Brazil
- Roman Catholicism in Brazil
