= Izidoro Kosinski =

Izidoro Kosinski CM
- Bishop of Três Lagoas
- Church: Catholic Church
- Diocese: DIocese of Três Lagoas
- In office: 8 May 1981 – 7 January 2009
- Predecessor: Geraldo Majela Reis
- Successor: José Moreira Bastos Neto

Orders
- Ordination: 21 December 1957
- Consecration: 24 July 1981 by Carmine Rocco

Personal details
- Born: 1 April 1932 Tomás Coelho, Rio de Janeir, Federal District of Brazil, Republic of the United States of Brazil
- Died: 15 September 2017 (aged 85) Curitiba, Paraná, Brazil

Izidoro Kosinski (1 April 1932 – 15 September 2017) was a Roman Catholic bishop.

Ordained to the priesthood in 1957, Kosinski served as bishop of the Roman Catholic Diocese of Três Lagoas Brazil, from 1981 until 2009.
