= José Moreira Bastos Neto =

Brazilian Roman Catholic bishop

- Bishop of Três Lagoas
- Church: Catholic Church
- Diocese: Diocese of Três Lagoas
- In office: 7 January 2009 – 26 April 2014
- Predecessor: Izidoro Kosinski
- Successor: Luiz Gonçalves Knupp

Orders
- Ordination: 28 October 1979
- Consecration: 19 April 2009 by Hélio Gonçalves Heleno

Personal details
- Born: 25 January 1953 Simonésia, Minas Gerais, United States of Brazil
- Died: 26 April 2014 (aged 61)

José Moreira Bastos Neto (25 January 1953 – 26 April 2014) was a Brazilian Roman Catholic bishop.

Ordained to the priesthood in 1979, Bastos Neto was appointed bishop of the Roman Catholic Diocese of Três Lagoas, Mato Grosso do Sul, in 2009. He died while still in office.

== See also ==
- Roman Catholic Diocese of Três Lagoas
