= Hercule Audiffret =

French orator and religious writer (1603–1659)

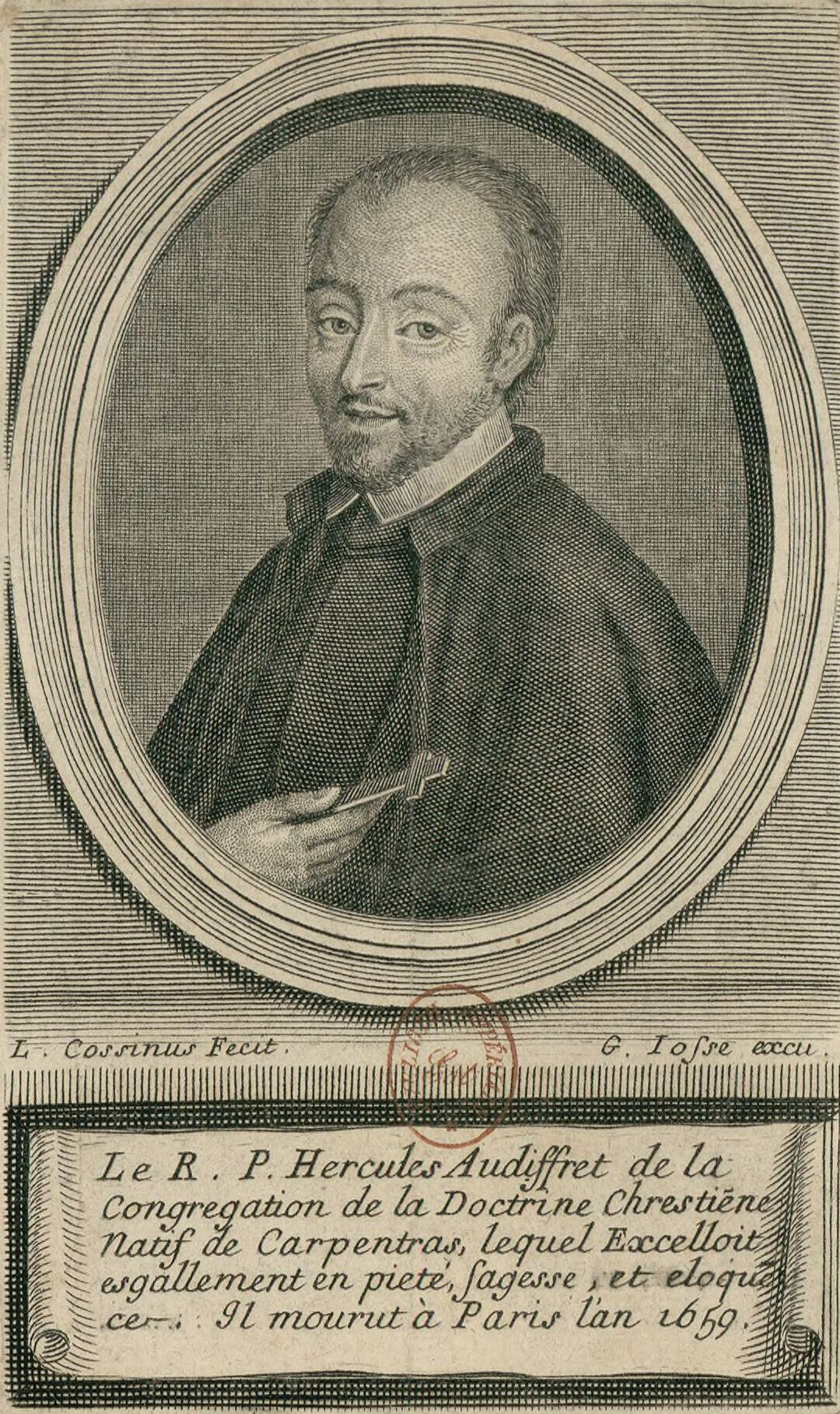
Hercule Audiffret

Hercule Audiffret D.C. (15 May 1603 – 6 or 16 April 1659), known as "le Père Hercule", was a French orator, religious writer and Superior General of the Congrégation des Doctrinaires. He was the maternal uncle of Esprit Fléchier.

== Life ==
Hercule Audiffret was born in Carpentras, the son of Pancrace Audifret and Esprite Dambrun.

Hercule Audiffret entered the Congrégation des Doctrinaires in 1620.

He was the first Superior General of the Congrégation des Doctrinaires from 1647 to 1653, after the Congrégation was split from the Somascan Fathers.

He died in Paris.

== Works ==
- Lettres à Philandre (1637-1638)
  - Collection of 16 letters sent to Valentin Conrart, the first Secrétaire perpétuel of the Académie Française, by Hercule Audiffret, while he was staying in Grasse as the guest of bishop Antoine Godeau (December 1637 to June 1638)
  - Le Père Hercule (1975). Couton, Georges; Giraud, Yves (eds.). Lettres a Philandre (1637-1638). Fribourg: Editions Universitaires. ISBN 9783727801297.
- Questions et explications spirituelles et curieuses, sur le psautier et divers psaumes de David (1668)
- Ouvrages de piété. Instructions chrétiennes et religieuses (1675)
- Eulogy of Marguerite de Montmorency, Princesse de Condé
- Eulogy of Duc de Candale
