= Redovino Rizzardo =

Brazilian bishop (1939–2016)

Redovino Rizzardo CS
- Bishop of Dourados
- Church: Catholic Church
- Diocese: Diocese of Dourados
- In office: 5 December 2001 – 21 October 2015
- Predecessor: Alberto Johannes Först
- Successor: Henrique Aparecido de Lima
- Previous post: Coadjutor Bishop of Dourados (2001)

Orders
- Ordination: 9 July 1967
- Consecration: 25 March 2001 by Alberto Johannes Först

Personal details
- Born: 12 April 1939 Bento Gonçalves, São Pedro do Rio Grande do Sul, Republic of the United States of Brazil
- Died: 6 November 2016 (aged 77)

Redovino Rizzardo (12 April 1939 – 6 November 2016) was a Roman Catholic bishop.

Ordained to the priesthood in 1967, Rizzardo served as coadjutor bishop of the Roman Catholic Diocese of Dourados, Brazil, in 2001 and then served as diocesan bishop from 2001 until 2015.

He died on 6 November 2016, at the age of 77 from prostate cancer.
