= Gonorreia Visceral =

Studio album by Holocausto Canibal
- Released: February 2000
- Recorded: 1999, Rec'n'Gore Studios
- Genre: Goregrind, grindcore, death metal
- Length: 18:18
- Label: So Die Music
- Producer: Paulo Brandão

Holocausto Canibal chronology
oPus I (1998)	Gonorreia Visceral (2000)	Sublime Massacre Corpóreo (2002)

Gonorreia Visceral (Portuguese for "Visceral Gonorrhea") is the first studio album by Portuguese grindcore band Holocausto Canibal. It was released in February 2000 by So Die Music. The album was recorded in 1999 at Rec'n'Gore Studios, in Vila do Conde, Portugal, and was produced by Paulo Brandão. The album was preceded by the oPus I demo tape, released in 1998.

This was the first Portuguese album to feature a gory artwork designed with true photos and not drawings which would become a trademark of the band from that moment on since every subsequent artwork was conceived in a similar way.

In 2014, in an article featured on Portuguese Loud! Magazine on the tenth anniversary of "Sublime Massacre Corpóreo", Holocausto Canibal revealed their plans to re-record "oPus I" and "Gonorreia Visceral" as part of the 15th year celebration of the release of their first album. A few months later, in an interview on "Larvas", they confirmed this intention and pointed out 2015 as the release date of this record, also revealing that they are already working on a new full-length.

== Track listing ==
All music composed by Holocausto Canibal. All lyrics written by Z. Pedro.

No.	Title	Length
1.	"Vagina Convulsa (Convulsed Vagina)"	02:04
2.	"Holocausto Canibal (Cannibal Holocaust)"	01:41
3.	"Empalamento (Impalement)"	01:01
4.	"Antropofagia Auto Infligida (Self Inflicted Anthropophagy)"	02:12
5.	"Septicemia Vaginal (Vaginal Septicemia)"	02:01
6.	"Carnificina Psicopata (Psychopath Carnage)"	04:22
7.	"Gorgasmos... Orgásmicos Espasmos Gore (Gorgasms... Gory Orgasmic Spasms)"	01:58
8.	"Faixa 8 (Track 8)"	02:59
Total length:		18:18

== Credits ==
Holocausto Canibal

- Carlos – vocals
- Nuno Pereira – guitar
- Jose Pedro – bass
- Joao Lamelas – drums

Production

- Paulo Brandão – sound engineering, producing, mixing, mastering
- Christophe Szpajdel – logo
