= Segismundo Martínez Álvarez =

Spanish priest (1943–2021)

Segismundo Martínez Álvarez (23 February 1943 – 21 April 2021) was a Spanish-born Brazilian Roman Catholic bishop.

== Biography ==
Martínez Álvarez was born in Spain and was ordained to the priesthood in 1972. He served as bishop of the Roman Catholic Diocese of Corumbá, Brazil from 2002 until 2018.

He died from COVID-19 on 21 April 2021 in Corumbá at the age of 78.
