= Diocese of Três Lagoas =

Catholic ecclesiastical territory

Diocese of Três Lagoas Dioecesis Trilacunensis Diocese de Três Lagoas

Location
- Country: Brazil
- Ecclesiastical province: Campo Grande
- Metropolitan: Campo Grande

Statistics
- Area: 49,000 km^{2} (19,000 sq mi)
- Population: Total; Catholics: (as of 2010); 243,000; 183,000 (75.3%)

Information
- Rite: Latin Rite
- Established: 3 January 1978 (48 year ago)
- Cathedral: Cathedral of St Anthony in Três Lagoas

Current leadership
- Pope: Leo XIV
- Bishop: Luiz Gonçalves Knupp

The Roman Catholic Diocese of Três Lagoas (Latin: Dioecesis Trilacunensis) is a diocese located in the city of Três Lagoas in the ecclesiastical province of Campo Grande in Brazil.

== History ==
- January 3, 1978: Established as Diocese of Três Lagoas from the Diocese of Campo Grande

== Leadership ==
- Bishops of Três Lagoas (Roman rite), in reverse chronological order
  - Bishop Luiz Gonçalves Knupp (2015.02.25 -
  - Bishop José Moreira Bastos Neto (2007.01.07 - 2014.04.26)
  - Bishop Izidoro Kosinski, C.M. (1981.05.08 – 2007.01.07)
  - Bishop Geraldo Majela Reis (later Archbishop) (1978.01.03 – 1981.02.03)
