= Archdiocese of Campo Grande =

Latin Catholic jurisdiction in Brazil

Coordinates: 20.4662°S 54.6185°W

Archdiocese of Campo Grande Archidioecesis Campi Grandis Arquidiocese de Campo Grande
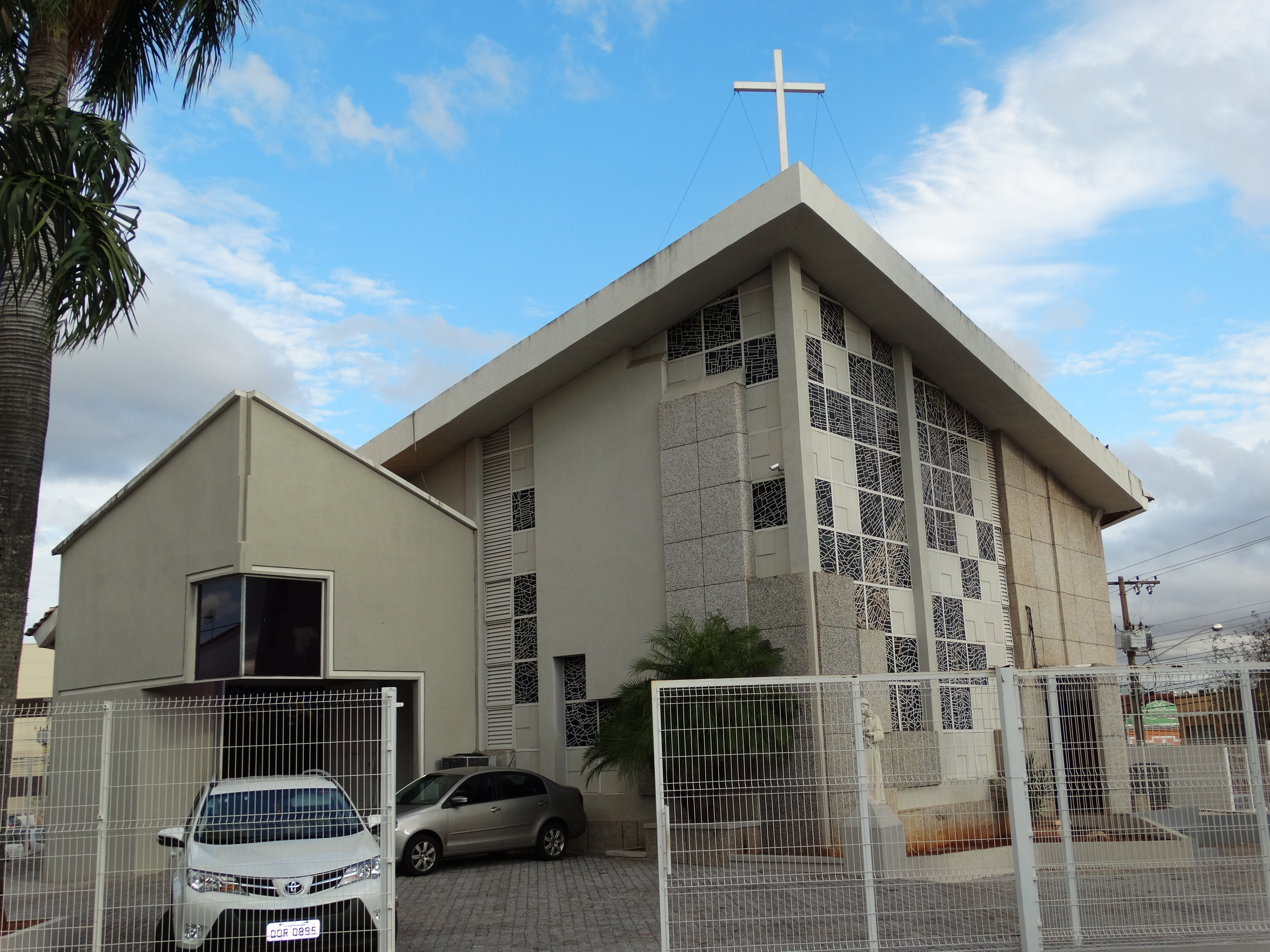

- Coat of arms

Location
- Country: Brazil
- Ecclesiastical province: Campo Grande

Statistics
- Area: 44,892 km^{2} (17,333 sq mi)
- Population: Total; Catholics: (as of 2006); 2,222,000; 1,673,000 (75.3%)

Information
- Denomination: Catholic Church
- Sui iuris church: Latin Church
- Rite: Roman Rite
- Established: 15 June 1957 (69 years ago)
- Cathedral: Cathedral of Our Lady of the Abbey and St. Anthony in Campo Grande

Current leadership
- Pope: Leo XIV
- Metropolitan Archbishop: Dimas Lara Barbosa
- Bishops emeritus: Vitório Pavanello

Website
- arquidiocesedecampogrande.org.br/arq/

The Roman Catholic Archdiocese of Campo Grande (Latin: Archidioecesis Campi Grandis) is a Latin Church ecclesiastical territory or archdiocese of the Catholic Church located in the city of Campo Grande, Brazil.

== History ==
- 15 June 1957: Established as Diocese of Campo Grande from the Diocese of Corumbá and Territorial Prelature of Registro do Araguaia
- 27 November 1978: Promoted as Archdiocese of Campo Grande

== Bishops ==
=== Ordinaries, in reverse chronological order ===
- Archbishops of Campo Grande
  - Archbishop Dimas Lara Barbosa (2011.05.04 - present)
  - Archbishop Vitório Pavanello, S.D.B. (1986.12.12 – 2011.05.04)
  - Archbishop Antônio Barbosa, S.D.B. (1978.11.27 – 1986.12.12)
- Bishops of Campo Grande
  - Bishop Antônio Barbosa, S.D.B. (later Archbishop) (1958.01.23 – 1978.11.27)

=== Coadjutor archbishop ===
- Vitório Pavanello, S.D.B. (1984-1986)

=== Auxiliary bishops ===
- Eduardo Pinheiro da Silva, S.D.B. (2005-2015), appointed Bishop of Jaboticabal, São Paulo
- Janusz Marian Danecki, O.F.M. Conv. (2015-2024)

== Suffragan dioceses ==
- Corumbá
- Coxim
- Dourados
- Jardim
- Naviraí
- Três Lagoas

== Sources ==
- GCatholic.org
- Catholic Hierarchy
- Archdiocese website
