= João Onofre =

Portuguese visual artist

- Born: 1976; Lisbon, Portugal
- Education: Faculdade de Belas Artes – Universidade de Lisboa, Goldsmiths, University of London Colégio das Artes – Universidade de Coimbra
- Known for: video, performance, other media
- Website: http://www.joaoonofre.com/

João Onofre (born 1976, in Lisbon) is a Portuguese visual artist. He had his first solo exhibition in 2001, at I-20 Gallery in New York. Since then, he has made over 35 solo shows and taken part in over 200 group exhibitions in both Portuguese and in International museums and galleries. He lives and works in Lisbon.

== Work ==
Onofre's work encompasses a variety of media, such as drawing, photography, objects, installation and primarily video. In the footsteps of the pioneers of performance from the 60s and 70s, his video works consist mostly of delegated performances to non-actors, whose "talents and skills are not merely a backdrop in his work, but serve as primary structuring elements. Like a Minimalist choreographer studying a gesture or movement, or a composer isolating a tone or rhythm, Onofre breaks things down and reconstructs them, creating a new form in the process." This practice of delegation, as noted by Claire Bishop, "is not just a one-way, downward gesture. The performers also delegate something to the artist: a guarantee of authenticity, through their proximity to everyday social reality, conventionally denied to the artist, who deals merely in representations." Intrinsic to this desire to place the artwork within reality and thus, in the sphere of action, is the concept of duration which Onofre has been exploring since his first video work, Untitled (we will never be boring) (1997), which features a performing couple, formally dressed, opposite each other, walking on separate treadmills, for the duration of a video tape – one hour; it is in the unwinding of this fortuitous and yet undetermined action that the duration, a necessarily tense duration, is established. This tension, which arises from a certain amount of indeterminacy that marks the unfolding of the action, is evident in most of Onofre's video works, such as Casting (2000) (exhibited at the 49th Venice Biennale), Instrumental version (2001), or Pas d'action (2002). At play in these pieces is also the notion of collective as both three feature a group of people. In Casting, a group of young advertising models is asked to recite to the camera, one at the time, a line from the movie Stromboli, unaware that the casting is the art project itself, "showing us the emptiness of the modern fast-moving and narcissistic society wherein the single individual might have just one single possibility of being successful, a chance that is decided by the camera's eye and the capacity to deal with it"; in Instrumental version, a chamber choir interprets Kraftwerk's theme "The Robots", vocalizing the song's synthesized sounds, giving "a human aspect to the composition, while erasing the textual/communicative qualities of the song", while in Pas d'action, a group of ballet dancers is asked to endure in semi and demi points (classical ballet's positions) throughout the duration of the video: "A position that is usually a unit in a greater artistic vocabulary is immobilised and now becomes simply a trial of endurance; what appears initially light and effortless is changed by Onofre's intervention into a physically strenuous act. One by one the dancers become exhausted and drop to a standing position."

Between 2002 and 2004 he directs four videos set on his studio, a choice intended to reflect on the artist's studio not only as the place of artistic creation but as a subject in itself, reiterating in a sense, the words of Bruce Nauman: "If I was an artist and I was in the studio, then whatever I was doing in the studio must be art. At this point art became more of an activity and less of a product; Believe (levitation in the studio) (2002), features a magician performing a levitation, in a clear allusion to Bruce Nauman's 1966 photograph, Failing to Levitate in the Studio; Untitled (vulture in the studio) (2002), in which he sets loose a vulture inside the studio and films the animal deranging it; Catriona Shaw sings Baldessari sing LeWitt re-edit Like a Virgin extended version (2003), a mashup of three cultural references – John Baldessari's video performance Baldessari Sings LeWitt (1972), Sol LeWitt's Sentences on Conceptual Art (1968), and Madonna's tune "Like a virgin" (1984) – in the form of a delegated performance starring the singer Catriona Shaw, and in 2004, Leap into the street (boombox travelling), which marks the passage from the studio to the public domain, through a tautology, as a boombox falls from a shelf into the street through the studio window crashing into a tree, driven by the rhythm and basses of Joy Division's 1979's theme "She's Lost Control". That same year he approaches the subject of finitude through the object Untitled (Lisbon's authorized death locations) (2004), a map containing every hospital with a morgue and cemetery in Lisbon, Portugal, whose location is pinpointed by a yellow star-shaped fluorescent sticker, a work which paved the way for the 2006 photographic series, Every gravedigger in Lisbon, seven group portraits featuring the gravediggers of each cemetery in Lisbon.

Insisting on the subject of finitude, now relating it to the notion of silence, Onofre's Box Sized DIE featuring... (2007-ongoing) is an iron cube with the exact same dimensions and outward look of Tony Smith's minimalist sculpture DIE (1962), with the particularities of being soundproof and having an accessible interior (as one of its sides functions as a door), in which a death metal band is invited to play; as they begin to play, the door is shut from the outside, and the band elements keep on playing until they run out of oxygen, making the performance's duration entirely variable and unknown; not only that, as the interior is acoustically isolated, the audience only hears faint residues from the reverberation of the music played inside, until the door is opened again at the end of the performance. Having been presented in over ten cities across Europe over the past 13 years – Basel, Bordeaux, Barcelona, Copenhagen, Aalst, Porto, Vitoria-Gasteiz, Madrid, Paris and London – Box sized DIE was first exhibited in Lisbon, Portugal, in 2007, at Cristina Guerra Contemporary Art, featuring the band Sacred Sin, and most recently, with the band Holocausto Canibal, at Onofre's solo show Once in a Lifetime [Repeat], at Culturgest, Lisbon, in 2019.

A sense of inadequacy is felt throughout the 2007 video Untitled (I See a Darkness), in which two young boys aged 11 and 12 interpret Johnny Cash's cover of Will Oldham's theme I See a Darkness – a grievous song about a tragic and hopeless future, a sentiment that neither one, due to their age, lack of maturity and life experience, is able to understand and convey appropriately, for their voices and facial expressions reveal a candidness contrary to the severity of the theme. This sense of inadequacy is furthered by the image of the video which starts pitch black and ends in an obfuscating white, thus inverting the meaning of the title: "This video thus reveals its macabre dimension, which makes the viewer all the more uncomfortable as it depicts the innocence and fragility of childhood." The appropriation of cultural references, particularly from pop music, which undergoes a process of postproduction, is a more than recurrent operation in Onofre's work. Untitled (levelling a spirit level in free fall feat. Dorit Chrysler's BBGV dub) (2009), is another example of this creative appropriation, as the soundtrack of the video, which shows the best five attempts of a European free fall champion to stabilize a spirit level at 200 km/h, is a Theremin cover of The Beach Boys' theme "Good Vibrations" composed and interpreted by Dorit Chrysler who, in 2011, performed it live in the context of Onofre's solo exhibition at the Palais de Tokyo in Paris. Another case is the 2010-11 video Untitled (N'en Finit Plus), which stars a teenage girl singing acapella Petula Clark's "La Nuit n'en Finit Plus" (itself a cover from the theme "Needles and Pins" popularized by The Searchers, only with different lyrics), inside a hole on the ground of a prairie.

In 2010 Onofre was commission a work for the Portuguese Representation at the 12th International Exhibition of the Venice Biennale of Architecture: Untitled (SUN 2500) features a 9-metre sailing boat being placed by a crane in a 10-metre swimming pool of a private house in the centre of Lisbon.

In 2012 he completes the work GHOST, initiated in 2009, a video which documents the silent journey of a 15x9-meter floating island, inhabited by an 11-metre tropical palm tree, which crosses the city of Lisbon along the Tagus River, from east to west, until it gets lost on the horizon. In 2014 Onofre directs Tacet, in which he retrieves the subject of silence (or of its impossibility), through a delegated performance based on a double appropriation from John Cage – his work 4'33'' and the program of the Prepared Piano –, which consists of a pianist interpreting Cage's 4'33'', after preparing the piano with flammable liquid and setting it alight; the pianist must then endure the dense wall of fire which grows in front of him, while performing the silent piece.

In the 2015 video VOX the Portuguese guitarist Norberto Lobo plays his theme "Eu Amo" under an umbrella on a promontory of the Portuguese coast. His performance is documented in a sequence-shot by a giro-stabilized camera mounted on a helicopter, which responds to the crescendo and diminuendo of the music which confers the video its performative character.

Between 2016 and 2017 Onofre produced the site-specific performative work Untitled (orchestral) for the Museum of Art, Architecture and Technology in Lisbon, a sound installation controlled by the luminous intensity of the sun, performed in robotic percussion from a spatialized score created from a selection of ambient sounds of its location, an inactive boiler room. In 2017 he created another site-specific work, Untitled (bells tuned D.E.A.D.), a spatialized real-time composition in which four bell towers in the city of Coimbra, Portugal, ringed their bells in a specific order every day at 6 p.m. playing the notes D, E and A, creating a sense of dialogue between them. His most recent work, and longest video to date, Untitled (zoetrope) (2018–2019), is a 2h39min sequence shot of a performance starring a gospel choir, several young rugby players and a 4 elements' band interpreting live Foreigner's iconic theme "I Want to Know What Love Is" (1984), documented in a circular travelling that follows the musicians playing but also the players' attempts to sing the chorus of the track before being tackled by their counterparts.

Alongside his artistic practice, Onofre has been working as a teacher since 2001. He began as a coordinating teacher at Escola Superior Artes e Design in Caldas da Rainha, Portugal, having then taught at Faculdad de Bellas Artes – Universitat de Barcelona, Spain, and since 2013, at the Faculdade de Belas-Artes of the University of Lisbon where he is currently Assistant Professor and the Regent of the Performance class.

== Exhibitions ==
Onofre has exhibited his work extensively in solo shows at I-20 Gallery, New York (2001 and 2006), at MoMA PS1, New York (2002), National Museum of Contemporary Art - Museu do Chiado, Lisbon, Galicia Contemporary Art Centre (CGAC), Santiago de Compostela (2003), Project Space Karlsplatz, Wien (2003), Magazin 4, Bregenz (2004), Lighten Up at Centro de Artes Visuais (CAV), Coimbra (2010), Palais de Tokyo, Paris (2011), Fundació Joan Miró, Barcelona (2011), Neuer Kunstverein, Wien (2013), Kunstpavillon, Munich (2015), Museum of Art, Architecture and Technology (MAAT), Lisbon (2017), and in a solo show Once in a Lifetime [Repeat], at Culturgest, Lisbon (2019), where he premiered Untitled (zoetrope) (2018-2019).

He has taken part in international group exhibitions including Performing Bodies at Tate Modern, London (2000), The 49th Venice Biennale - Plateau of Humankind (2001), Human Interest at the Philadelphia Museum of Art (2002), The Youth of Today at the Schirn Kunsthalle, Frankfurt (2006), Centre Pompidou Video Art: 1965-2005 at CaixaForum Barcelona (2005), which travelled to the Taipei Fine Arts Museum (2006), and to the Museum of Contemporary Art Australia (MCA), Sydney (2007), and Postscript: Writing After Conceptual Art at the Museum of Contemporary Art Denver, Denver (2012), which travelled to The Power Plant, Toronto (2013) and to the Eli and Edythe Broad Art Museum, Michigan (2014).

== Collections ==
Onofre's work is represented in collections of the Museum of Contemporary Art (MCA), Chicago; the Albright-Knox Art Gallery, Buffalo, New York, the MNAM/CCI - Centre Georges Pompidou, Paris; the Weltkunst Foundation, Zurich; La Caixa, Barcelona; Museu de Serralves (MACS), Porto; CAM - Calouste Gulbenkian Foundation, Lisbon; National Museum of Contemporary Art - Museu do Chiado, Lisbon; Galleria civica d'arte moderna e contemporanea (GAM), Turin, and the Centre National des Arts Plastiques, Ministère de Culture, Paris.

== Awards and grants ==
- 2015 – Grant awarded by the Calouste Gulbenkian Foundation, Lisbon, Portugal
- 2011–2012 – Grant awarded by the Marcelino Botín Foundation, Santander, Spain
- 2011 – Grant awarded by the Calouste Gulbenkian Foundation, Lisbon, Portugal
- 2010 – Commission of a work of art for the Portuguese Representation at the 12th International Architecture Exhibition of the Venice Biennale
- 2007 – Grant awarded by the Luso American Foundation, Portugal
- 2007 – Commission of a work of art by the Studio Museum in Harlem, New York, U.S.A.
- 2003 – Artist in residence of the International Centre Convent de Recollets, Mairie de Paris, France
- 2003 – Commission of a work of art by National Museum of Contemporary Art – Museu do Chiado, Lisbon, Portugal
- 2001 – União Latina Contemporary Art Award, União Latina, Lisbon, Portugal
- 2000 – Grant awarded by the Calouste Gulbenkian Foundation, Lisbon, Portugal
- 2000 – Grant awarded by Instituto de Arte Contemporânea, Lisbon, Portugal
