= Onofre Cândido Rosa =

Onofre Cândido Rosa S.D.B.
- Bishop of Jardim
- Church: Catholic Church
- Diocese: Diocese of Jardim
- In office: 16 February 1981 – 4 August 1999
- Predecessor: Diocese erected
- Successor: Bruno Pedron
- Previous posts: Bishop of Corumbá (1978-1981); Coadjutor Bishop of Corumbá (1977-1978); Titular Bishop of Illiberi (1970-1978); Coadjutor Bishop of Uberlândia (1971-1977); Auxiliary Bishop of Uberlândia (1970-1971)

Orders
- Ordination: 8 December 1957
- Consecration: 19 March 1970 by Umberto Mozzoni

Personal details
- Born: 5 August 1924 Paraguaçu, Minas Gerais, Republic of the United States of Brazil
- Died: 9 December 2009 (aged 85)

Onofre Cândido Rosa S.D.B. (5 August 1924 – 9 December 2009) was a Brazilian Catholic bishop of the Diocese of Jardim.

Ordained to the priesthood on 7 December 1957, Cândido Rosa was named auxiliary bishop on 9 January 1970, and was ordained on 19 March 1970. After serving several Brazilian dioceses as bishop, he became bishop of the Jardim Diocese on 11 February 1982, retiring on 4 August 1999.
