= Regiae (city) =

Regiae (or Regiæ) was an ancient city and former bishopric in Roman North Africa. It is currently a Latin Catholic titular see. Its presumed location is Arbal, in modern Algeria.

== History ==
The city was important enough in the Roman province of Mauretania Caesariensis to become a suffragan diocese of its capital Caesarea Mauretaniae's Metropolitan archbishopric. However it later faded.

=== Titular see ===
The diocese was nominally restored as a Latin Catholic titular bishopric in 1933, the Italian Curiate title being Regie.

It has had the following incumbents, all of the lowest (episcopal) rank :

- Marcel Daubechies, White Fathers (M. Afr.) (1950.02.03 – 1959.04.25), former Apostolic Administrator of Bangweulu (Zambia) (1949 – 1950.02.03), when appointed as Apostolic Vicar of Kasama (actually the same, renamed; Zambia) (1950.02.03 – 1959.04.25), later promoted first Bishop of Kasama (1959.04.25 – 1964.11.25), emeritate as Titular Bishop of Buffada (1964.11.25 – 1976.08.09)
- Thomas Joseph Riley (1959.11.04 – 1977.08.17)
- Luis María Estrada Paetau, Dominican Order (O.P.) (1977.10.27 – 2011.03.25)
- Donald Joseph Hying (2011.05.26 – 2014.11.24)
- Janusz Marian Danecki, Conventual Franciscans (2015.02.25 – 2024.08.30) (O.F.M. Conv.), Auxiliary Bishop of Campo Grande (Brazil)
