= Bruno Pedron =

Italian priest and theologian (1944–2022)

The Most Reverend Bruno Pedron S.D.B.
- Bishop Emeritus of Ji-Paraná
- Diocese: Ji-Paraná
- Appointed: 11 April 2007
- Term ended: 5 June 2019
- Predecessor: Antônio Possamai
- Successor: Norbert Hans Christoph Foerster
- Previous post: Bishop of Jardim (1999–2007)

Orders
- Ordination: 6 April 1974
- Consecration: 21 May 1999 by Vitório Pavanello

Personal details
- Born: 3 June 1944 Torreglia, Italy
- Died: 17 June 2022 (aged 75) Campo Grande, Brazil
- Motto: Para que todos sejam um
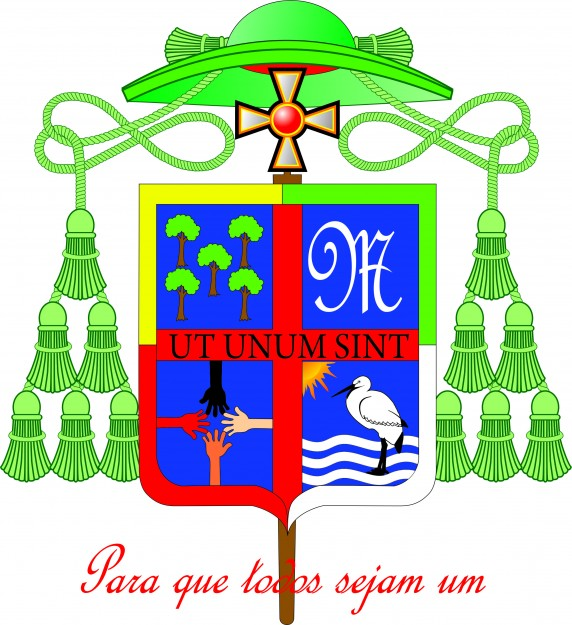
- Coat of arms

Styles of Bruno Pedron
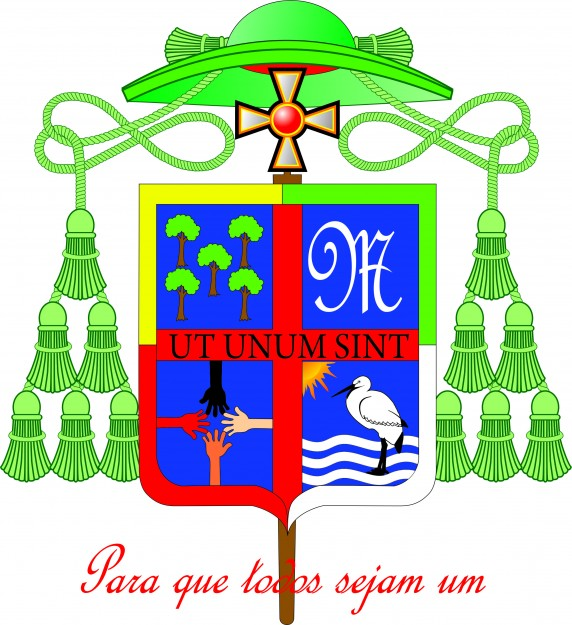
- Reference style: His Excellency; The Most Reverend
- Spoken style: Your Excellency
- Religious style: Bishop

Bruno Pedron S.D.B. (3 June 1944 – 17 June 2022) was an Italian Roman Catholic prelate.

Pedron was born in Torreglia, Italy and was ordained to the priesthood in 1974. He served as coadjutor bishop and bishop of the Roman Catholic Diocese of Jardim, Brazil, from 1999 to 2007 and as bishop of the Roman Catholic Diocese of Ji-Paraná, Brazil, from 2007 until his retirement in 2019.

Catholic Church titles
Preceded by Antônio Possamai	Bishop of Ji-Paraná; 2007–2019	Succeeded by Norbert Hans Christoph Foerster
Preceded by Onofre Cândido Rosa	Bishop of Jardim; 1999–2007	Succeeded by Jorge Alves Bezerra
