= Ramón D. Abellanosa =

Filipino writer

- Born: August 31, 1904; Pardo, Cebu City
- Died: March 22, 1984 (aged 79); Cebu City
- Occupations: Journalist and politician
- Years active: 1940s-

Ramón D. Abellanosa Vice Mayor (Acting)
- In office September 13, 1957 – September 13, 1958

Ramón D. Abellanosa born as Ramón Abasolo Abellanosa, (August 31, 1904 – March 22, 1984) was a Filipino Visayan political journalist, minor politician, businessman, and writer. He was best known for his plays. He was the son of Baldomero Abellanosa and brother of Onofre and Victorino. He was journalist at the Philippine Advertiser and Ang Tigmantala. Among his positions in 1940s were Member of the City Board and Acting Vice Mayor of Cebu City and editor of the Philippine Newsday and Pilipinhon. On April 13, 1959, he was responsible for the city ordinance No. 252 regulating one-way traffic for certain streets from 6 AM to 9 AM and also No. 251 which regulated the activities of passenger dispatchers and their licensing fees.

A road in Sunrise Village, Pardo, Cebu City is named in his honor.

== Plays ==
- Ganghaan sa Lubong, 1926.
- Binuno sa Palad, 1926.
- Doring
