= Ascurra =

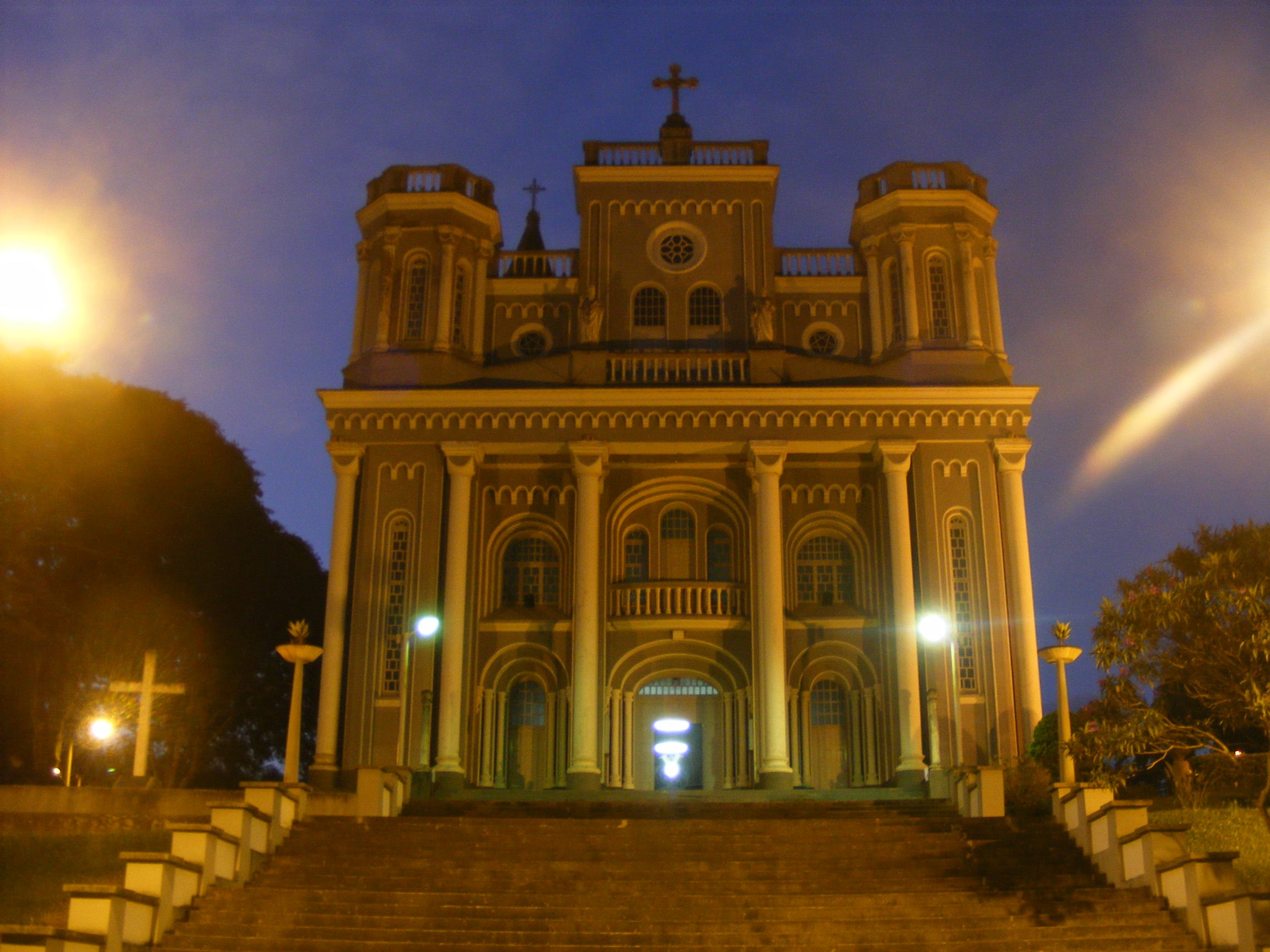

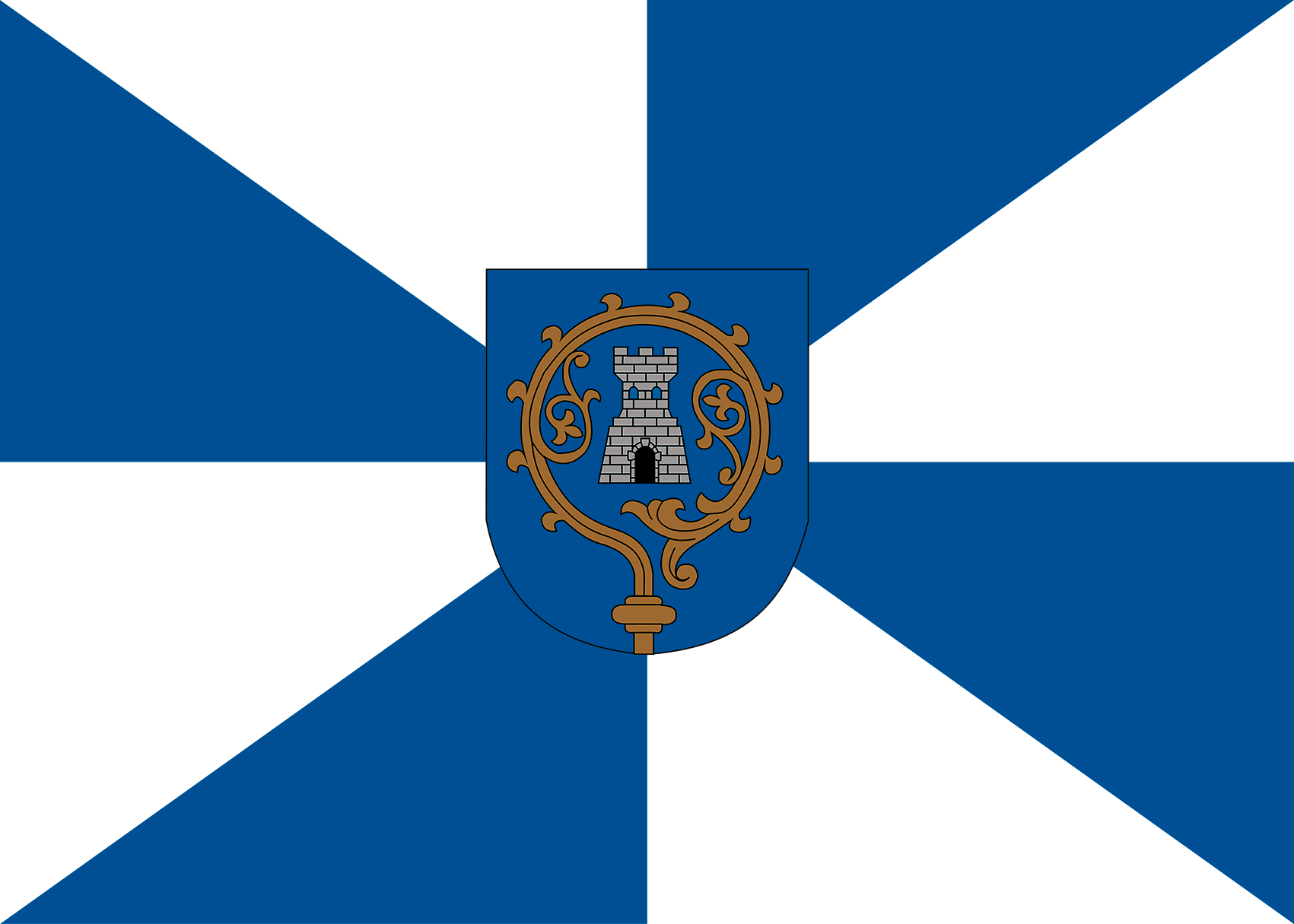
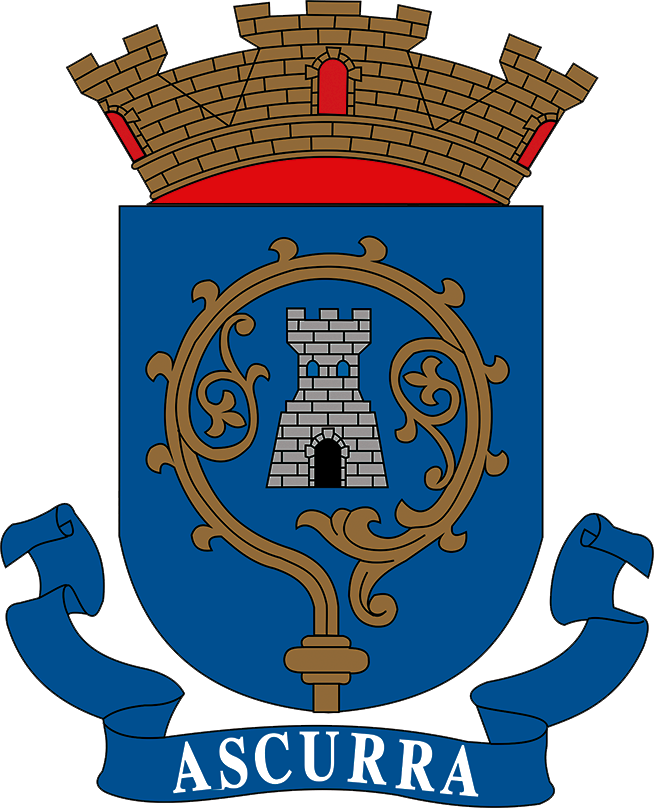
- Flag Coat of arms

- Location of Ascurra

- Location within Brazil
- Coordinates: 26°57′18″S 49°22′33″W
- Country: Brazil
- Region: South
- State: (Santa Catarina (state)) Santa Catarina
- Founded: April 1, 1963

Government
  - Mayor: Arão Josino (Novo (2025-2028))

Area
  - Total: 110.901 km^{2} (42.819 sq mi)
- Elevation: 88 m (289 ft)

Population (2020)
  - Total: 7,978
  - Density: 71.94/km^{2} (186.3/sq mi)
- Time zone: UTC-3 (UTC-3)
  - Summer (DST): UTC-2 (UTC-2)
- HDI (2015): 0.741
- Website: www.ascurra.sc.gov.br

Ascurra is a municipality located in the Santa Catarina state of Brazil. Ascurra has a strong Italian culture due to its colonization in 1876 by farmers from Welschtirol. Hermann Blumenau (1819–1899) named the municipality after a point in Serra do Ibitirapé, Paraguay of the same name that was taken by the Brazilian Army during the Paraguayan War in 1869.

Ascurra covers 110.901 km^{2} (42.819 mi^{2}), and has a population of 7,978 with a population density of 70 inhabitants per square kilometer.

== Geography ==
Ascurra is located 40 kilometres (25 mi) from Blumenau and 200 kilometres (120 mi) from the state capital of Florianópolis. The Itajaí-Açu River crosses Ascurra.

== Economy ==
Mainly from the rice agriculture.

== Events ==
Per Tutti – A high Tirolean-influenced party that occurs between August and September.
