= Christian Doctrine Fathers =

Catholic clerical religious congregation

Congregation of Christian Doctrine
- Congregatio Patrum Doctrinae Christianae
- Abbreviation: DC
- Formation: 1592; 434 years ago
- Founder: César de Bus
- Founded at: L'Isle-sur-la-Sorgue, France
- Type: Clerical Religious congregation of Pontifical right for men
- Headquarters: General Motherhouse: Santa Maria in Monticelli 28, Rome, Italy
- Coordinates: 41°54′4.9″N 12°27′38.2″E
- Members: 85 members (includes 54 priests) as of 2020
- Superior General: Sergio La Pegna
- Ministry: Parish ministry, teaching and publishing—especially catechetical texts.
- Website: users.libero.it/dottry/ (in Italian)

The Christian Doctrine Fathers, actually the Congregation of Christian Doctrine (Latin: Congregatio Patrum Doctrinae Christianae), abbreviated DC, and also commonly called the Doctrinaries, is a religious congregation of Pontifical right for clerics in the Roman Catholic Church.

As of 31 December 2020, the congregation consisted of 20 communities with 85 religious, 54 of them priests. Doctrinari priests are devoted mainly to parish ministry, teaching and publishing—especially catechetical texts.

== History ==
The congregation was founded on 29 September 1592 in L'Isle-sur-la-Sorgue, France by French priest César de Bus (1544–1607) as a community of priests devoted to the education of children. The institute was approved by the Holy See on 23 December 1597. It was reorganized by Pope Benedict XIII and Pope Benedict XIV, who in 1747 joined the brotherhood founded in Rome in 1560 by Marco de Sadis Cusani.

== Saints, Blesseds, and Servants of God belonging to the congregation ==
Saints

- César de Bus (3 February 1544 – 15 April 1607), founder of the order, canonized on 15 May 2022

Blesseds

- Claude Bochot (10 July 1720 – 3 September 1792), priest and Martyr of the French Revolution, beatified on 17 October 1926
- Eustache Félix (23 April 1726 – 3 September 1792), priest and Martyr of the French Revolution, beatified on 17 October 1926

Servants of God

- Joseph Raoulx (10 August 1737 - 25 July 1794), priest and Martyr of the French Revolution

== Other notable members ==
- José Alves da Costa – Brazilian prelate of the Catholic Church (1939–2012)
- Hercule Audiffret – French orator and religious writer (1603–1659)
- Vilson Dias de Oliveira – Brazilian prelate of the Catholic Church (born 1958)
- Esprit Fléchier – French preacher, author, Catholic prelate (1632–1710); Entered the congration in 1648 and left it in 1659.
