= César de Bus =

French Catholic priest and saint (1544–1607)

Saint César de Bus
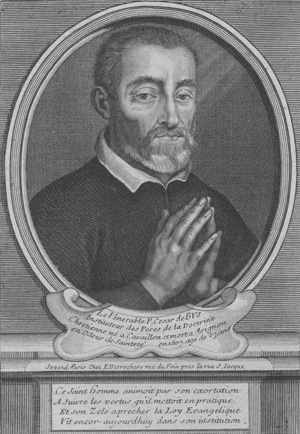

Priest
- Born: 3 February 1544; Cavaillon, Comtat Venaissin, Papal States
- Died: 15 April 1607 (aged 63); Avignon, Papal States
- Venerated in: Catholic Church
- Beatified: 27 April 1975, Saint Peter's Basilica, Vatican City by Pope Paul VI
- Canonized: 15 May 2022, Saint Peter's Square, Vatican City by Pope Francis
- Feast: 15 April
- Patronage: Christian Doctrine Fathers

César de Bus (3 February 1544 – 15 April 1607) was a French Catholic priest and founder of two religious congregations.

== Life ==
César de Bus was born in Cavaillon, Comtat Venaissin (now in France). At eighteen he joined the king's army and took part in the war against the Huguenots (members of the Protestant Reformed Church of France during the 16th and 17th centuries). After the war he devoted some time to poetry and painting, but soon made up his mind to join the naval fleet which was then besieging La Rochelle, a seaport on the western French coast. Owing to a serious sickness, though, he could not carry out this design.

Up to this time, de Bus had led a pious and virtuous life which, however, during a sojourn of three years in Paris was exchanged for one of pleasure and dissipation. From Paris he went back home to Cavaillon. Upon the death of his brother, a canon (priest) of Salon, he succeeded in obtaining the vacated church benefice (stipend), which he sought for the gratification of his worldly ambitions.

Shortly after this, however, he returned to a better life, resumed his studies, and in 1582 was ordained to the priesthood. He distinguished himself by his works of charity and his zeal in preaching and catechizing and conceived the idea of instituting a congregation of priests who should devote themselves to the preaching of Christian doctrine. In 1592, the "Prêtres séculiers de la doctrine chrétienne (Secular Priests of Christian Doctrine)", known as Christian Doctrine Fathers, were founded in the Swiss town of L'Isle and in the following year came to Avignon, France. This institute's development into a religious congregation was approved by Pope Clement VIII on 23 December 1597. Besides the Christian Doctrine Fathers, de Bus founded a congregation for women originally called "Daughters of Christian Doctrine", which later came to be called the "Ursulines", which died out in the 17th century.

Five volumes of de Bus' Instructions familières were published (Paris, 1666).

== Veneration ==
The cause for de Bus was formally opened on 18 January 1686, granting him the title of Servant of God. Pope Pius VII declared him venerable on 8 December 1821, and Pope Paul VI beatified him in Rome on 27 April 1975. On 27 May 2020 Pope Francis issued a decree via the Congregation for the Causes of Saints approving a miracle and hence clearing the way for de Bus to be proclaimed a saint; he was canonized on 15 May 2022.
