= Onofre =

Scientific classification
- Kingdom: Animalia
- Phylum: Arthropoda
- Subphylum: Chelicerata
- Class: Arachnida
- Order: Araneae
- Infraorder: Araneomorphae
- Family: Salticidae
- Subfamily: Salticinae
- Genus: Onofre; Ruiz & Brescovit, 2007

Type species
- O. sibilans Ruiz & Brescovit, 2007

Species
- O. carnifex Ruiz & Brescovit, 2007 – Brazil; O. necator Ruiz & Brescovit, 2007 – Brazil; O. sibilans Ruiz & Brescovit, 2007 – Brazil

Genus of spiders

Onofre is a genus of Brazilian jumping spiders that was first described by G. R. S. Ruiz & Antônio Domingos Brescovit in 2007. As of August 2019 it contains only three species, found in the Amazon basin of Brazil: O. carnifex, O. necator, and O. sibilans. They are related to members of Chira, and the three species were described from the states of Mato Grosso and Pará. The generic name is a common man's name in Brazil.
