= Victorino Abellanosa =

Cebuano dramatist and composer

Victorino A. Abellanosa (23 December 1903 – 8 August 1968) was a Filipino dramatist and composer who wrote in Cebuano. He wrote around twenty plays, most of them zarzuelas, including Ninoy, Marti and King Solomon. His plays were staged in Cebu, Bohol, Leyte and Negros.

== Biography ==
Abellanosa was born in Pardo, Cebu, on 23 December 1903. His father, Baldomero Abellanosa, was a composer in Pardo. His brothers Ramón and Onofre Abellanosa were also writers.

He began writing plays in 1921. He later became known as a dramatist and composer, producing around twenty plays, primarily zarzuelas. He died on 8 August 1968.

== Selected plays ==
- Ninoy
- Marti
- King Solomon
