= Onofre Pratdesaba =

Onofre Pratdesaba (1733 in Vic – 1810 in Rome) was a Catalan jesuit and writer.

He taught philosophy in Barcelona and theology in Girona. He was expelled by Charles III of Spain and, like many others, he continued to study arts and sciences in Italy.

He lived for over thirty years in Ferrara.

== Works ==
- Imago optimi Episcopi, sive de vita et virtutivus V. Raymundi Marimonii Vicensis in Ausetanis Episcopi (Ferrara, 1785)
- Borsi Aretini primi Ferrariensis Ducis Prosopopaeia (Ferrara, 1785)
- De causis nullius fructus reportati in promovendo probabiliorismo vocibus, scriptis pluribus Torquati Firmiani ad Lelium Flaminium Dissertatio Epistolaris(venècia, 1786)
- Vicennalia Sacra Aragoniensia, sive de viris aragoniensibus religione illustribus hisce viginti annis gloriosa morte functis (Ferrara, 1787)
- Vicennalia Sacra Peruviana, sive de viris peruvianis hisce viginti annis gloriosa morte functis (Ferrara, 1788)
- Pelajus (Ferrara, 1789)
- Ramirus (Ferrara, 1789)
- Ferdinandus (Ferrara, 1792)
- Saggio della vita, delle virtú e di prodigi del Padre Giovanni di Santiago, della Compagnia di Gesù (Parma, 1798)
- Operum scriptorum aragoniensum elim e Societate Jesu in Italiam deportatorum Index (Rome, 1803)
