= Onofre Betbeder =

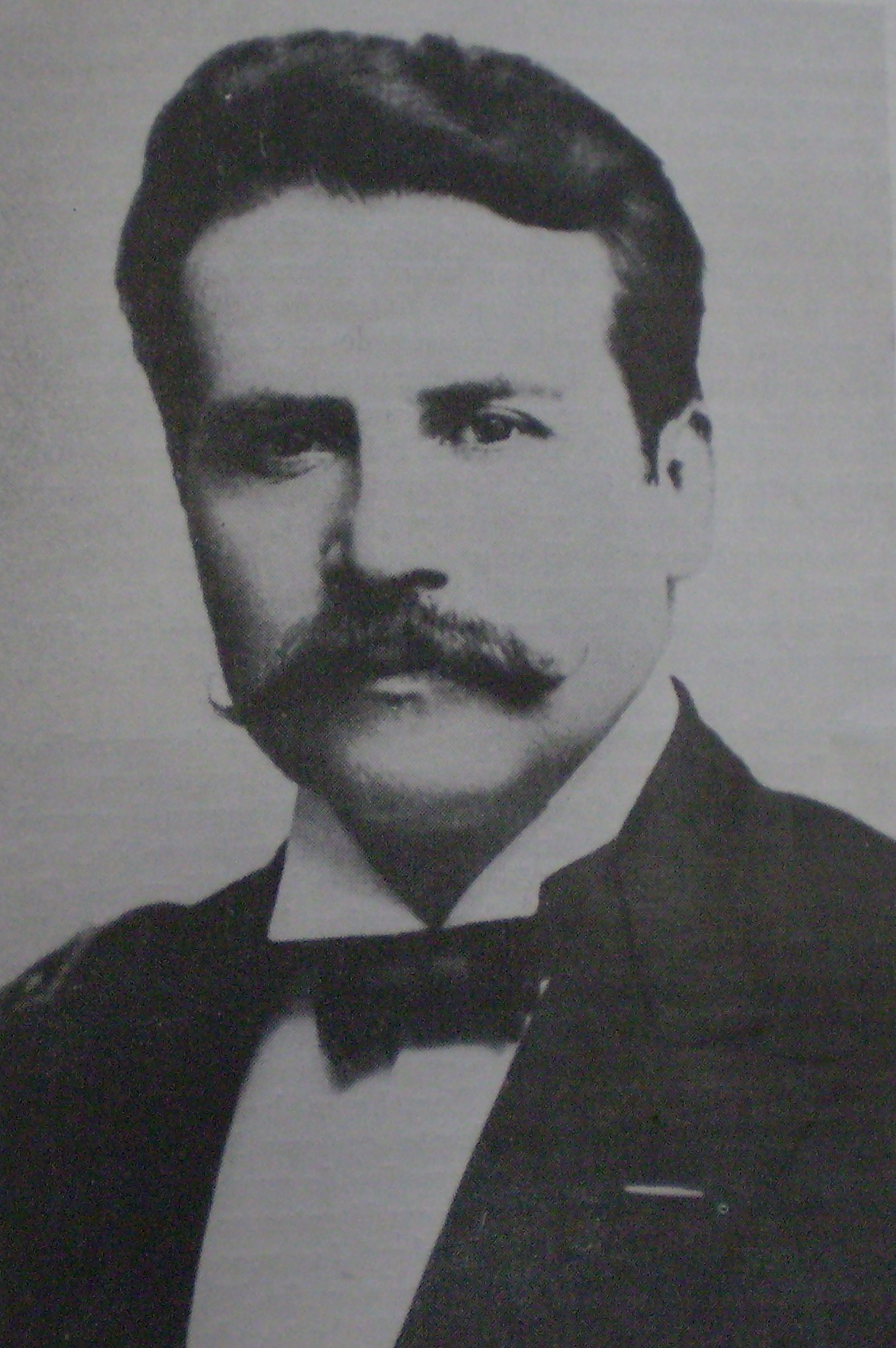
Onofre Betbeder

Onofre Betbeder (1862 – 24 January 1915) was an Argentine vice-admiral who had been twice-appointed Minister of the Navy. The Betbeder Islands are named for him.

Betbeder was born in Argentina and entered the military as a midshipman. As Minister of the Navy, he was concerned with improving the education of naval officers, and increasing the efficiency and operating standards of the naval department. In 1915, he was serving as Chief of the Argentine naval commission to the U.S. when he died at his residence in New York City.

The Betbeder Islands are part of the Wilhelm Archipelago, off the west coast of Antarctica. They were discovered in 1903–1905 by a French expedition and named for Betbeder.

== See also ==
- Cape Betbeder
