= Onofre Abellanosa =

Filipino writer (1913–1974)

Onofre A. Abellanosa (1913–1974) was a Filipino Bisayan playwright and author of short stories.

== Personal life ==
Abellanosa was born on June 11, 1913 as the youngest of three brothers. His father was Baldomero Abellanosa, also a writer and a musician. His brothers Ramón and Victorino A. Abellanosa were also writers.

Abellanosa married Maria Villena Pacres. They had 10 children.

== Known works ==
- Ang Kagabhion (short story), published in Bisaya, 1946.
- Ang Pahiyum Mo, 1949.
- Florika (play), 1930.
- Gahum sa Latigo (play), 1967.
- Karaang Talamdan sa mga Damgo, 1956.
- Miranda, 1930.
- Opon, 1932.
