= Dimas Lara Barbosa =

Brazilian Catholic archbishop (born 1956)

The Most Reverend Dimas Lara Barbosa
- Archbishop of Campo Grande
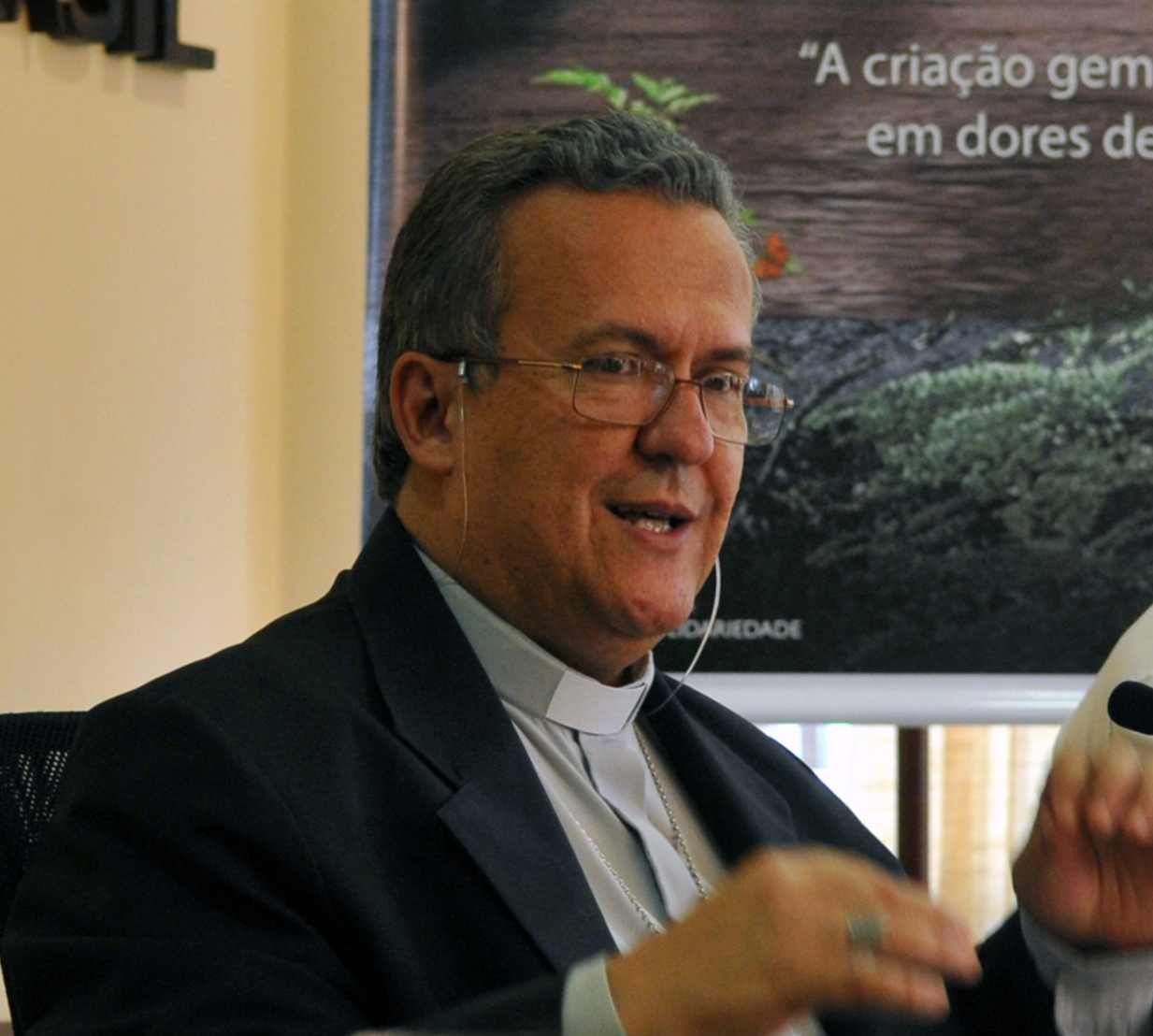
- Church: Roman Catholic Church
- Archdiocese: Campo Grande
- See: Campo Grande
- Appointed: 4 May 2011
- Installed: 10 July 2011
- Predecessor: Vitório Pavanello
- Previous post(s): Titular Bishop of Megalopolis in Proconsulari (2003-11); Auxiliary Bishop of São Sebastião do Rio de Janeiro (2003-11); Secretary General of the Brazilian Episcopal Conference (2007-11); Second Vice-President of the Latin American Episcopal Council (2011-15)

Orders
- Ordination: 3 December 1988 by Eusébio Oscar Scheid
- Consecration: 2 August 2003 by Eusébio Oscar Scheid

Personal details
- Born: Dimas Lara Barbosa; 1 April 1956 (age 69); Boa Esperança, Minas Gerais, Brazil
- Motto: Servir com alegria

Dimas Lara Barbosa (born April 1, 1956) is a Brazilian prelate of the Roman Catholic Church. He served as auxiliary bishop of São Sebastião do Rio de Janeiro from 2003 till 2011, when he became archbishop of Campo Grande.

== Life ==
Born in Boa Esperança, Lara Barbosa completed a PhD in systematic theology from the Pontifical Gregorian University in Rome.

He was ordained to the priesthood on December 3, 1988, serving in São José dos Campos.

On June 11, 2003, he was appointed auxiliary bishop of São Sebastião do Rio de Janeiro and titular bishop of Megalopolis in Proconsulari. Lara Barbosa received his episcopal consecration on the following August 2 from Eusébio Oscar Scheid, archbishop of São Sebastião do Rio de Janeiro, with the bishop of São José dos Campos, José Nelson Westrupp, and the auxiliary bishop of Brasília, Raymundo Damasceno Assis, serving as co-consecrators.

On May 4, 2011, he was appointed archbishop of Campo Grande. He was installed on the following July 10.
