= Diocese of Primavera do Leste–Paranatinga =

Catholic ecclesiastical territory

Diocese of Leste–Paranatinga Diocesis Primavera de Orientalis Veris–Paranatinguensis Diocese de Primavera do Leste-Paranatinga

Location
- Country: Brazil
- Ecclesiastical province: Cuiabá
- Metropolitan: Cuiabá

Statistics
- Area: 98,056 km^{2} (37,860 sq mi)
- Population: Total; Catholics: (as of 2014); 170,000; 127,500 (75%)

Information
- Rite: Latin Rite
- Established: 25 June 2014 (12 years ago)
- Cathedral: Cathedral of St. Francis Xavier in Paranatinga

Current leadership
- Pope: Leo XIV
- Bishop: vacant
- Metropolitan Archbishop: Mário Antônio da Silva
- Bishops emeritus: Derek Byrne

The Diocese of Primavera do Leste–Paranatinga (Latin: Diocesis Primavera de Orientalis Veris–Paranatinguensis) is a Latin suffragan Roman Catholic Diocese in the state of Mato Grosso, in the ecclesiastical province of the metropolitan Archbishop of Cuiabá in Brazil.

Its Cathedral episcopal see is the Catedral São Cristóvão, in Primavera do Leste. It also has a Co-Cathedral Co-Catedral São Francisco Xavier, in Paranatinga.

== History ==
- On December 23, 1997, the Territorial Prelature of Paranatinga was established on territory split off from the Diocese of Barra do Garças, Diocese of Rondonópolis and Diocese of Sinop
- 25 June 2014: Suppressed to become Diocese of Primavera do Leste–Paranatinga

== Leadership ==
Territorial Prelates of Paranatinga

- Vital Chitolina, Dehonians, S.C.I. (23 December 1997 - 28 December 2011), later Bishop of Diamantino (Brazil) (2011.12.28 – ...)

Bishops of Primavera do Leste–Paranatinga

- Derek Byrne, S.P.S. (25 June 2014 - 7 June 2023, previously Bishop of Guiratinga (Brazil) (2008.12.24 – 2014.06.25)
