= Gentil Delázari =

Brazilian priest (1940–2022)

His Excellency Gentil Delázari
- Bishop Emeritus of Sinop
- Archdiocese: Cuiabá
- Installed: 22 March 1995
- Term ended: 20 January 2016
- Predecessor: Henrique Froehlich
- Successor: Canísio Klaus
- Previous post: Coadjutor Bishop of Sinop (1994–1995)

Orders
- Ordination: 13 July 1968
- Consecration: 27 March 1994 by Aloísio Sinésio Bohn

Personal details
- Born: 9 September 1940 Relvado, Rio Grande do Sul, Brazil
- Died: 31 October 2022 (aged 82) Sinop, Mato Grosso, Brazil

Gentil Delázari (9 September 1940 – 31 October 2022) was a Brazilian Roman Catholic prelate.

Delázari was born in Brazil and was ordained to the priesthood in 1968. He served as coadjutor bishop of the Roman Catholic Diocese of Sinop, Brazil in 1994 and 1995 and was bishop of the diocese from 1995 until his retirement in 2016.

Catholic Church titles
Preceded by Henrique Froehlich	Bishop of Sinop; 1995–2016	Succeeded by Canísio Klaus
Preceded by —	Coadjutor Bishop of Sinop; 1994–1995	Succeeded by —
