= Cathedral Basilica of the Good Lord Jesus, Cuiabá =

Cathedral Basilica of the Good Lord Jesus
- Catedral Metropolitana Basílica Senhor Bom Jesus
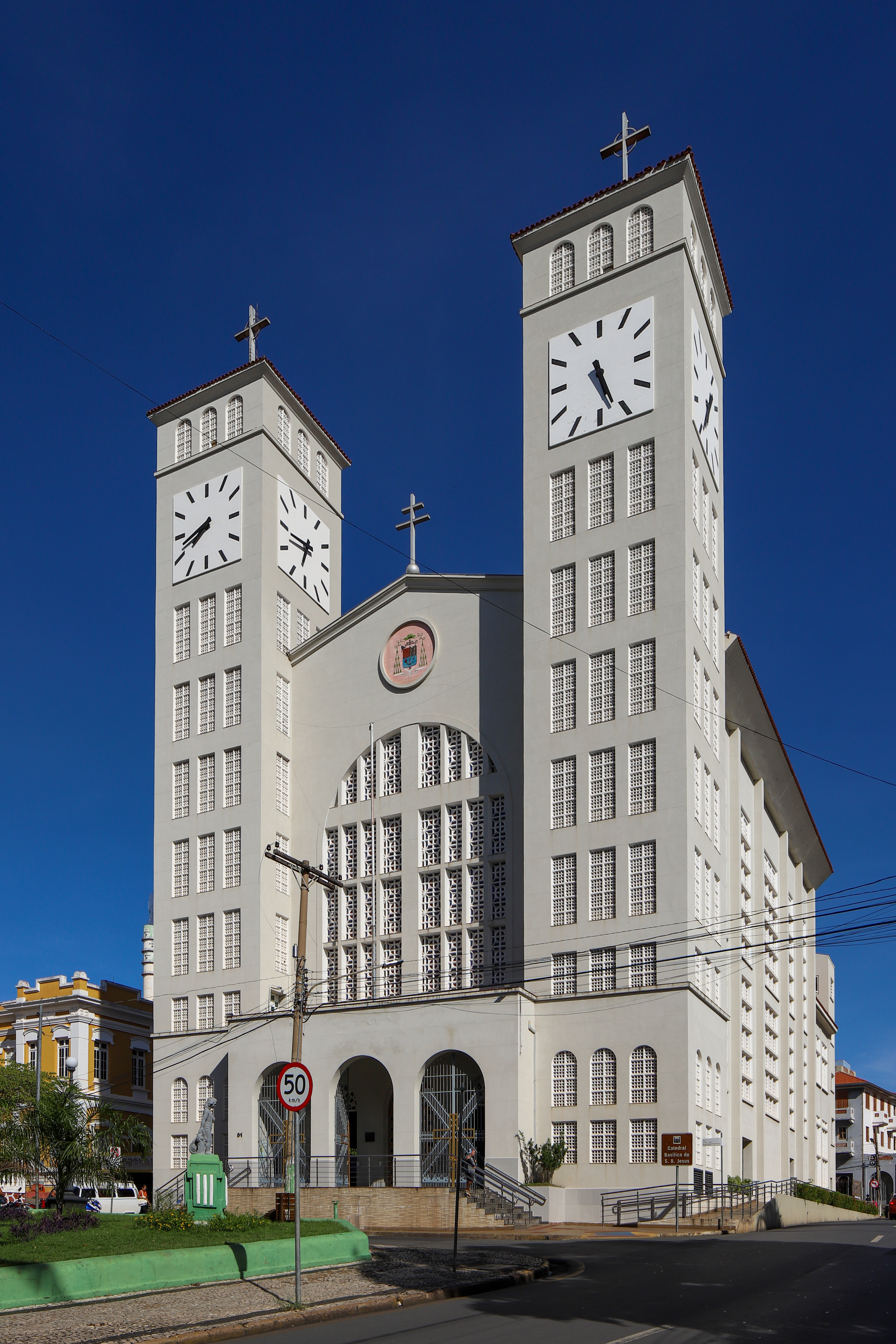
- Cathedral Basilica of the Good Lord Jesus
- 15.5977°S 56.0960°W
- Location: Cuiabá
- Country: Brazil
- Denomination: Roman Catholic Church

Architecture
- Years built: 1723–1973

Administration
- Archdiocese: Cuiabá

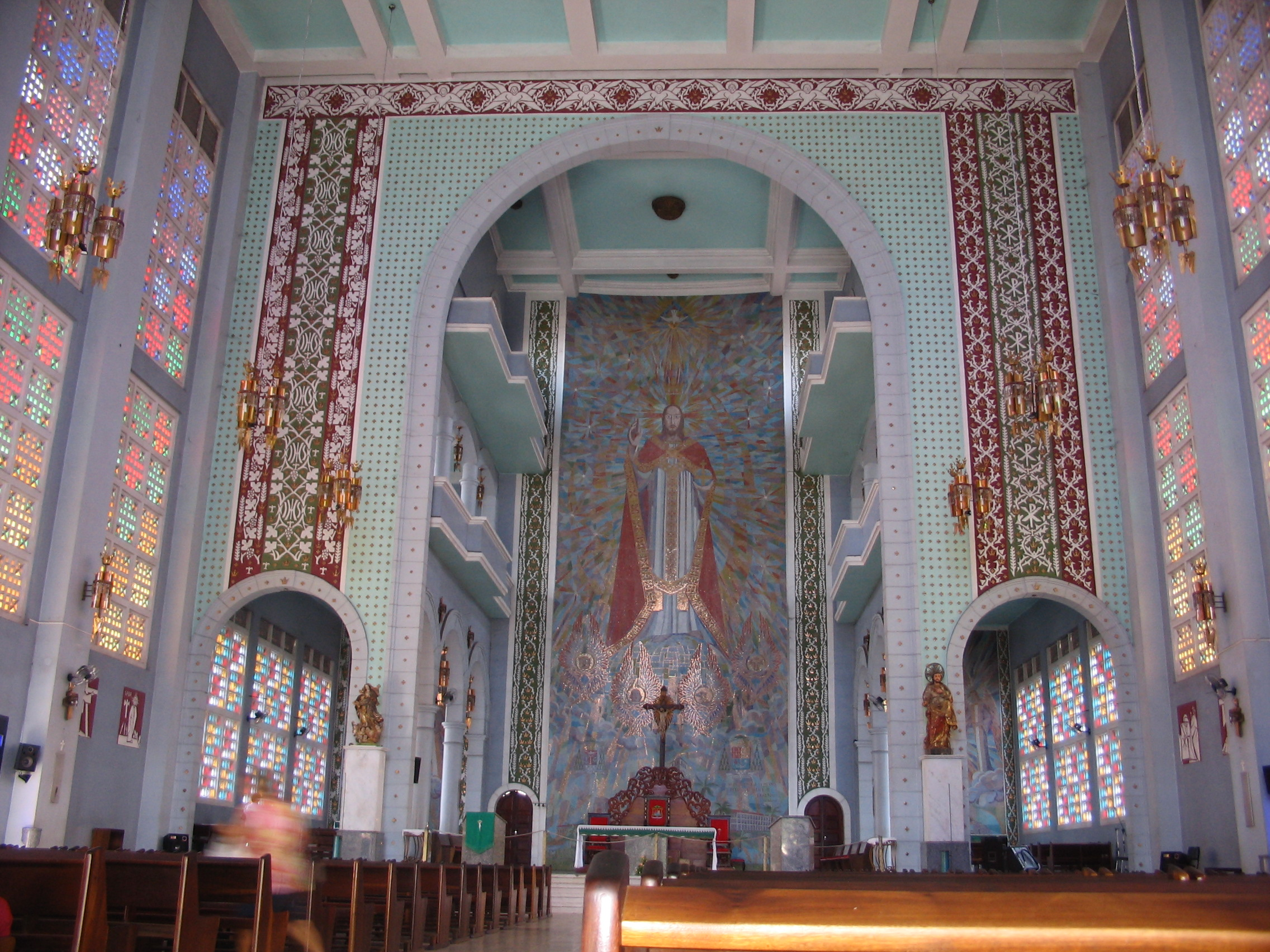
Internal view

The Cathedral Basilica of the Good Lord Jesus (also Metropolitan Cathedral Basilica of the Good Lord Jesus or Cuiabá Cathedral; Portuguese: Catedral Metropolitana Basílica Senhor Bom Jesus) is a Catholic church with basilica status, located in the city of Cuiabá, capital of the state of Mato Grosso in Brazil.

== First cathedral ==
Built in 1723, initially with wattle and daub (wood and lianas with mud), the mother church of Cuiabá, dedicated to the Good Lord Jesus (Senhor Bom Jesus), was rebuilt in rammed earth between 1739 and 1740, while the first bell tower dates from 1769. It became the seat of the prelature on December 6, 1745, and was elevated to the Diocese of Cuiaba on July 15, 1826. In 1868, underwent a reformation that altered the tower and the facade, was again modified in the 1920s, while at the same time the second tower was built. On April 5, 1910, the diocese was elevated to archdiocese.

=== Demolition ===
With the prevalent idea of modernization in the 1960s, the decision was made to demolish the first cathedral under the pretext that it was structurally unsound. This occurred on August 14, 1968, only after several charges of dynamite, an act that was remembered and lamented for several years. The decision was widely criticized. Etzel points out that it took "numerous loads of dynamite" to demolish the structure, questioning its lack of structural integrity.

The dynamiting of the old Matriz scored a sign of strength, due to the symbolic content that expressed the tensions between the old and the new, the provincial and the metropolitan, the conservatism and the progressive, the traditional and the modern that antagonized Cuiabá society.

— Júlio De Lamonica Freire, Por uma poética popular da arquitetura (1997)^{A}

== New cathedral ==
In place of the old church a new church was constructed of reinforced concrete. Work began at the back by the chancel, even before the complete demolition of the old church, and the new church was inaugurated on May 24, 1973. It was declared a minor basilica on November 15, 1974.

The Cathedral has a large nave on the ground level with a seating capacity of 800 people. The image Good Lord Jesus, the image of the Immaculate Conception, and the crucifix on the bishop's chair date to the 18th century. The second floor has a laundry and the third meeting rooms; the third and fourth floor are also used as a parish house. The crypt of the Cathedral is located in the basement below one of the belltowers; it houses the remains of numerous figures of Mato Grosso.

== Noted burials ==
- Pascoal Moreira Cabral Leme (1654 — 1730), bandeirante who discovered gold that led to the founding of Cuiabá
- Miguel Sutil de Oliveira, an early settler of Cuiabá
- Dom Carlos Luís d'Amour (1837 — 1921), Archbishop of Cuiabá
- Dom Francisco de Aquino Correia (1885 — 1956), noted author and Archbishop of Cuiabá
- Dom Orlando Chaves (1900 — 1981), Archbishop of Cuiabá

== Footnote ==
A.In Portuguese: "A dinamitação da velha Matriz ganhou força de signo, pelo conteúdo simbólico expresso nas tensões entre o velho e o novo, o provinciano e o metropolitano, o conservantismo e o progressista, o tradicional e o moderno que antagonizavam a sociedade cuiabana."

== See also ==
- Roman Catholicism in Brazil
