= Huberto Rohden =

Brazilian philosopher, educator and theologist

- Born: 30 December 1893; São Ludgero, Brazil
- Died: 7 October 1981 (aged 87); São Paulo, Brazil
- Alma mater: Innsbruck University (Austria), Valkenburg aan de Geul (Netherlands), Naples (Italy)
- Occupations: Philosopher, educator, theologist

Huberto Rohden Sobrinho, known as Huberto Rohden (30 December 1893 – 7 October 1981), was a Brazilian philosopher, educator, and theologist.

== Biography ==
He was born in São Ludgero. He was a pioneer of transcendentalism in Brazil and wrote more than 100 works, where he advanced an ecumenical spiritual approach towards education, philosophy, and science, emphasizing self-knowledge.

Rohden was a major proposer of a cosmo philosophy, which consists of an individual cosmic harmony within a "cosmocracy": a self-governed individual through universal ethical laws in connection with a collective consciousness of the universe and the flourishing of the divine essence of humans, assuming one has to be responsible for its acts and pursue an intimate reform, with no appeal to an ecclesiastic authority to release the debts of its moral behaviour.

He produced translations of various holy scriptures, notably the New Testament, the Bhagavad Gita, and the Tao Te Ching. He was concerned with editing such works as books with low prices, in order to enable access to them.

A former Jesuit priest during the beginning of the literary career, Rohden obtained majors in Sciences, Philosophy, and Theology at the Innsbruck University (Austria), Valkenburg aan de Geul (Netherlands), and Naples (Italy).

In Brazil, he founded the Instituição Cultural e Beneficente Alvorada (1952), taught at the Princeton University, American University (Washington, D.C.) and at the Universidade Presbiteriana Mackenzie (São Paulo). He delivered lectures in the United States, India, and Portugal.
