= Church of Saint Gonçalo (Cuiabá) =

- Igreja de São Gonçalo
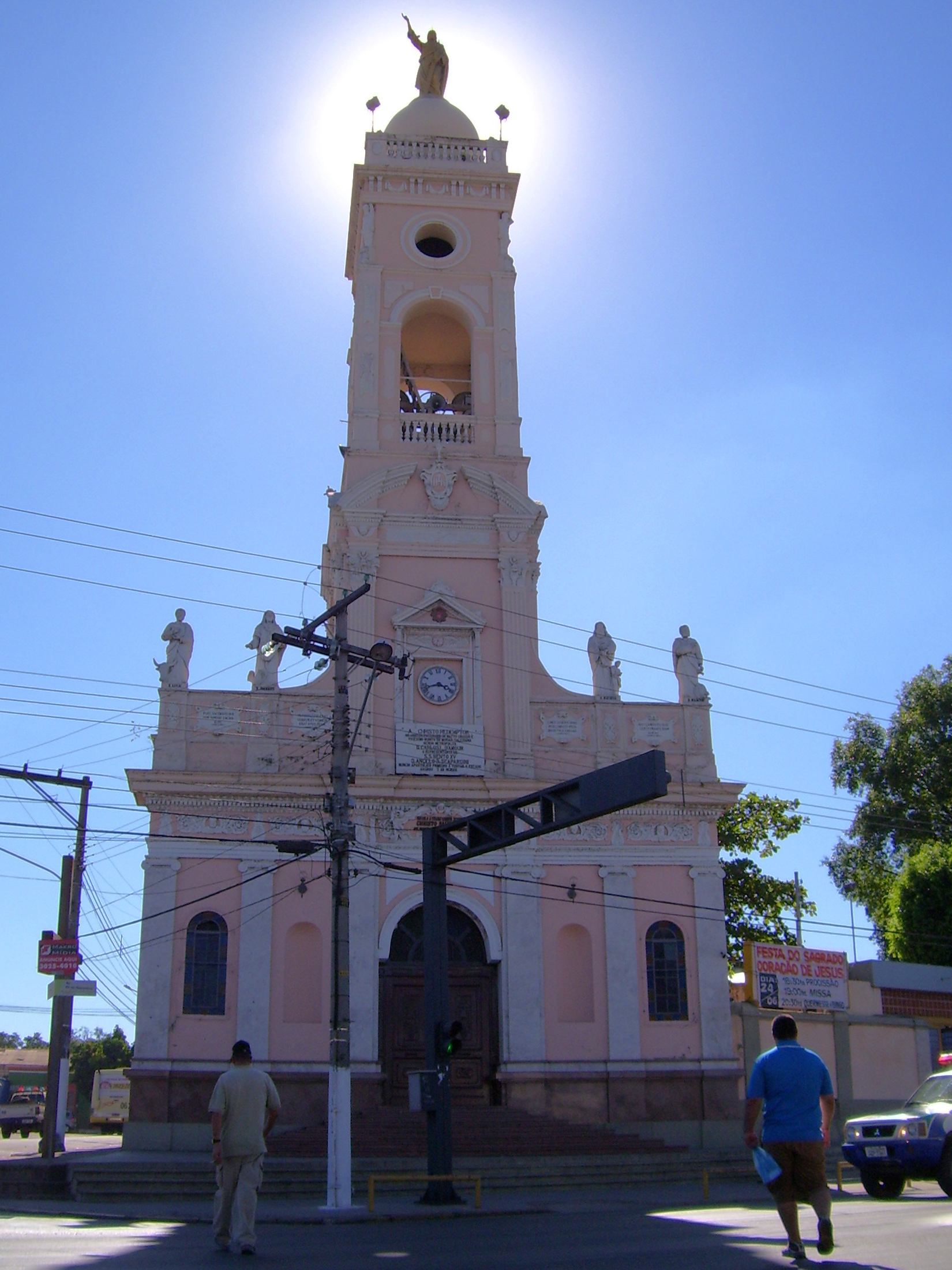

- Church of Saint Gonçalo in Brazil
- 15.611°S 56.1034°W
- Location: Cuiabá
- Address: Avenida XV de Novembro, 664 - Centro Sul, Cuiabá - Mato Grosso, 78020-300
- Country: Brazil
- Language: Portuguese
- Denomination: Roman Catholic
- Tradition: Roman Rite

History
- Dedication: Saint Gundisalvus of Amarante
- Consecrated: 1920

Architecture
- Functional status: Active
- Architectural type: Neoclassical

Administration
- Archdiocese: Roman Catholic Archdiocese of Cuiabá

Clergy
- Archbishop: Mário Antônio da Silva
- Priest: Rafael Gustavo Santos Souza

The Church of Saint Gonçalo (Portuguese: Igreja de São Gonçalo) is an early 20th-century Roman Catholic church in Cuiabá, Mato Grosso, Brazil. The church is dedicated to Saint Gundisalvus of Amarante and belongs to the Roman Catholic Archdiocese of Cuiabá. Saint Gonçalo (Gundisalvus of Amarante, 1187–1259) a Portuguese Catholic priest beautified under Pope Pius IV in 1561. Saint Gonçalo found particular devoation in Brazil, with both churches and place names dedicated to the saint. The church was built in two phases: one in 1781 in a simple Portuguese colonial style; little documentation of the structure exists, although it was built at the same time as the Church of Our Lady of Santana do Sacramento in nearby Chapada dos Guimarães. The first church structure was demolished in the late 19th century and replaced by the Salesians with a Tuscan neoclassical structure with a tall spire. Church festivals dedicated to Saint Gonçalo, Mary, Our Lady Help of Christians, Saint Benedict, and the Sacred Heart of Jesus are held annually. The church was listed as a state-level listed historic structure by Mato Grosso in 1984.

== Location ==
The Church of Saint Gonçalo is located in the Porto neighborhood of Cuiabá. It faces the neoclassical Headquarters of the 1st Military Police Battalion of Mato Grosso; the façade of the headquarters, like the Church of Saint Gonçalo, is listed as a state-level listed historic structure. The church and police headquarters, however, are located outside the perimeter of the Historic Center of Cuiabá.

== History ==
The Church of Saint Gonçalo traces its origin to a chapel built near the mouth of the Coxipó River in São Gonçalo Velho, a neighborhood now called São Gonçalo Beira Rio. Gold was discovered in São Gonçalo Velho, and the chapel was relocated to the Porto neighborhood.

=== 18th century structure ===
Dr. José Carlos Pereira^{A}, of Cachoeira, Bahia, served as the third circuit judge (juiz de fora) of Cuiabá and later magistrate (ouvidor) of the captaincy of Mato Grosso; he replaced Luiz de Azevedo Sampaio in the position. Upon assuming the role of magistrate, Pereira toured Chapada dos Guimarães, a mountainous settlement northeast of Cuiabá, and ordered the construction of a parish church. The Church of Our Lady of Santana do Sacramento was consecrated on July 31, 1779.

Pereira made an inspection visit to the Parish of D. Pedro II in Cuiabá and found the parish chapel abandoned. He ordered the construction of a new chapel in adobe in 1780. An inaugural mass was celebrated on the morning of November 15, 1781. The image of Saint Gonçalo located in the small São Gonçalo Velho chapel was relocated to the new church via a procession up the Coxipó River. The church was built in wood and adobe in a simple Portuguese colonial style, with a Latin Cross plan. The church lacked bell towers; bells were located on the exterior of the structure. It is unknown if the Church of Saint Gonçalo resembled the Church of Our Lady of Santana do Sacramento in Chapada dos Guimarães, both built under Pereira's appointment in Mato Grosso. The plans of the Chapada dos Guimarães structure remain, but little is known of the plan or appearance of the first Church of Saint Gonçalo.

Joaquim Ferreira Moutinho visited Cuiabá in 1868 and published his travel writing. He described the Church of São Gonçalo in 1869:

We have nothing to admire in this Church of artistic merit, but it is vast, simple and clean, owing almost everything to the care of its parish priest, who died of bladder cancer.^{B}

Moutinho also relates that Catholic images saved from the Fort of Coimbra were transferred to the Church of Saint Gonçalo during the Paraguayan War (1864-1870). They were brought to the port area of Cuiabá "amid great public commotion"; a legend states the image of the Blessed Virgin had shed tears on the occasion.

=== Salesian renovation ===
The Salesians arrived in Mato Grosso 1894 and quickly took on the management of renovations of several church structures in the state. The Salesians found the adobe Church of São Gonçalo in ruin, and demolished it to build a new structure in a Tuscan-inspired neoclassical style. The Salesian Father José Solari, a sculptor, painter, and scientist, was responsible for the design of the church. A legend states that the young people of Cuiabá, moved by piety, worked at night to look for sand, stone, and other construction materials and transported them up the Prainha Stream (now paved over as Avenida Duarte) to the site; the veracity of the legend is unclear.

A statue of Christ the Redeemer, measuring 3.4 metres (11 ft), was erected at the top of the Church's tower in 1916. It was produced in Italy and imported to Cuiabá by the commercial firm of the Capriata brothers. It was unveiled on December 17, 1916, to "much splendor", with a speech by Auxiliary Bishop Dom Aquino Correa and a music performance by the police battalion. The globe held by the Redeemer in the statue featured paintings of the continents; it was restored by the State Secretary for Culture, Sports and Leisure of Mato Grosso in 2016.

The church was inaugurated in 1920. Frei José Solari added images of the apostles on the façade.

=== Property transfer ===
The Church of Saint Gonçalo was only granted a deed to its property in 2009. There was no land registry offices in Cuiabá in the early 20th century when the Salesians began their reconstruction. A state law of Mato Grosso later determined that urban properties without a deed became properties of municipalities; and rural properties, of the state. The city government of Cuiabá, under mayor Chico Galindo, transferred the property of the church to the Archdiocese of Cuiabá by a decree signed December 2009.

== Structure ==
The Church of Saint Gonçalo has a long, narrow floor plan with an elaborate neoclassical façade, enhanced vertically by its bell tower. The façade is divided into five parts horizontally by pilasters; the central section is large, and occupied entirely by a large, single portal. The statue of Christ the Redeemer stands 2.4 metres (7.9 ft) above the 36 metres (118 ft) tower. Statues of the four Apostles sit above the exaggerated frieze, each with a traditional symbol at its foot: Saint Luke with a bull, Saint Matthew with a lamb, Saint Mark, and Saint John. The center of the base of the tower has a wide panel with a clock, which dates to 1842. The clock was located on the façade of the old Cathedral of Cuiabá, a baroque structure demolished in 1968. The clock was the second placed on the former cathedral, and was donated by the businessman José Antonio Soares.

=== Interior ===
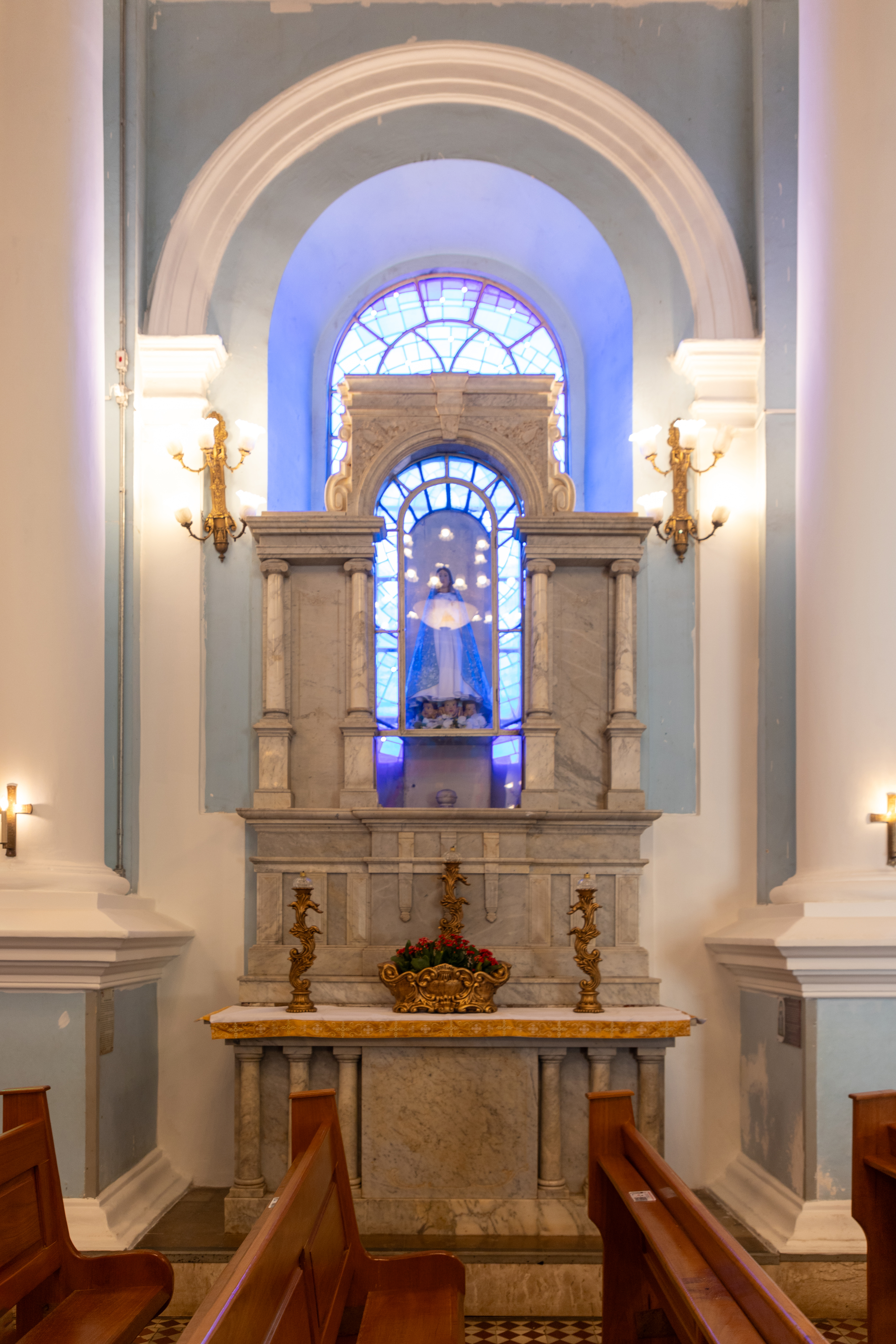
The altar

The church interior is home to a collection of artwork. An image of Our Lady of Conception is located on an altar to the left of the entrance. It was made in Paraguay, and is the protector of the young people of Cuiabá.

== Festivals ==
A small commemoration in honor of Saint Gonçalo is held on January 10, the saint's day. The large Festival of Saint Gonçalo is held on the last Saturday and Sunday of April at the end of the rainy season in Cuiabá. A procession featuring the flag of Saint Gonçalo is processed through the Porto neighborhood, followed by a mass, traditional dance, and fireworks. Smaller festivals are also held, dedicated to Mary, Our Lady Help of Christians (May), the Sacred Heart of Jesus (June), and Saint Benedict (October).

== Protected status ==
The Church of Saint Gonçalo was listed as a state-level historic structure by the State Secretary for Culture, Sports and Leisure of Mato Grosso (Secretaria de Estado de Cultura, Esporte e Lazer de Mato Grosso, SECEL) under listing no. 61/83 published January 1, 1984.

== Access ==
The Church of Saint Gonçalo is open to the public and may be visited.
