= Juventino Kestering =

Brazilian bishop (1946–2021)

- Bishop of Rondonópolis-Guiratinga
- Church: Catholic Church
- Diocese: Diocese of Rondonópolis-Guiratinga
- In office: 19 November 1997 – 28 March 2021
- Predecessor: Osório Willibaldo Stoffel
- Successor: Maurício da Silva Jardim

Orders
- Ordination: 14 July 1973
- Consecration: 8 March 1998 by Hilário Moser

Personal details
- Born: 19 May 1946 São Ludgero, Santa Catarina, United States of Brazil
- Died: 28 March 2021 (aged 74) Rondonópolis, Mato Grosso, Brazil

Juventino Kestering (São Ludgero, 19 May 1946 – Rondonópolis, 28 March 2021) was a Brazilian Roman Catholic bishop.

Kestering was born in São Ludgero and was ordained to the priesthood in 1973. He served as bishop of the Roman Catholic Diocese of Rondonópolis-Guiratinga, Brazil from 2014 until his death on 28 March 2021 from COVID-19 in Rondonópolis during the COVID-19 pandemic in Brazil.
