= Wender (footballer) =

Brazilian football manager and former player

Personal information
- Full name: Wenderson de Arruda Said
- Date of birth: 17 April 1975 (age 51)
- Place of birth: Guiratinga, Brazil
- Height: 1.79 m (5 ft 10 1/2 in)
- Position: Forward

Senior career*
Years	Team	Apps	(Gls)
1994	Sport Recife	11	(0)
1995	Botafogo	0	(0)
1996	Sport Recife	0	(0)
1997	Ceará		
1998–1999	Democrata-GV		
1999–2002	Naval	93	(33)
2002–2005	Braga	92	(23)
2005	Sporting CP	9	(0)
2006–2009	Braga	67	(13)
2008–2009	→ Belenenses (loan)	22	(5)
2009–2011	Ermis	59	(10)
2011–2012	Ethnikos Achna	27	(7)
2012–2013	Aris Limassol	21	(10)
Total		401	(101)

Managerial career
- 2016–2017: Palmeiras Braga (youth)
- 2017–2018: Braga (youth)
- 2018–2019: Braga B
- 2021: Covilhã
- 2022: Grêmio Anápolis
- * Club domestic league appearances and goals

Wenderson de Arruda Said (born 17 April 1975), commonly known as Wender, is a Brazilian former professional footballer who played as a forward, currently a manager.

He spent the vast majority of his career in Portugal, amassing Primeira Liga totals of 190 matches and 41 goals over seven seasons and representing in the competition Braga, Sporting CP and Belenenses.

Wender retired in 2013 at the age of 38, after spending four years in Cyprus with three clubs. He later worked as a coach, also in Portugal.

== Playing career ==
Born in Guiratinga, Mato Grosso with a Lebanese grandfather, Wender started playing professionally with Sport Club do Recife, then moved to Portugal with Associação Naval 1º de Maio after signing in 1999 from modest Esporte Clube Democrata. He spent three additional seasons at S.C. Braga, being a very important attacking player in the Minho team's Primeira Liga and UEFA Cup consolidation.

Wender joined Sporting CP for the 2005–06 campaign. Although he appeared scarcely for the Lisbon side, he scored in both legs of a UEFA Cup tie against Halmstads BK (2–1 away win, 2–3 home loss, subsequent elimination).

In January 2006, Wender was involved in a two-way loan deal as right-back Abel moved to Sporting and he returned for a second Braga spell. The loan was made permanent in 2006–07, and he went on to score eight league goals in an eventual fourth-place finish.

In July 2008, Wender signed with C.F. Os Belenenses' Brazilian contingent on a season-long loan. In the following year, after the capital-based team initially dropped down a tier – later reinstated– Braga sold the 34-year-old to Ermis Aradippou FC in the Cypriot First Division, and he remained in that country several years.

== Coaching career ==
In 2016, Wender was appointed under-17 coach of Palmeiras Futebol Clube, Braga's farm team. In summer 2017, he became the manager of the latter's under-17 squad, being promoted to B-side duties the following 25 January.

Wender left the Estádio Municipal de Braga by mutual consent on 18 February 2019. On 8 June 2021, he signed a contract at Liga Portugal 2 club S.C. Covilhã. He was dismissed on 19 October, with the team 11th in the league and having been eliminated from the Taça de Portugal by amateurs FC Serpa.

== Personal life ==
Wender's son, Yan (born 2002), was also a footballer and a forward. He was brought up at Braga.
