= Sônia Hess de Souza =

Brazilian businesswoman

- Born: 1959 (age 66–67); Luiz Alves
- Occupation: Businesswoman

Sônia Hess de Souza (Luiz Alves, SC, born 1959) is a Brazilian businesswoman, vice-president of the Women Group of Brazil, and former president of shirt company Dudalina. Her parents are Duda and Adelina, she is the second oldest child among 16 siblings. She left home at 17 to study in Spain. On her return, she stayed in São Paulo, where she was responsible for Dudalina's marketing area. Sônia took over the company in 2003 and was responsible for an annual growth of 30% of the brand since 2009. In 2008, Adelina died, and Dudalina was the largest shirt shop in the country, as she worked hard to maintain the difficult balance in family businesses. With the company in order, Sônia decided to fulfill a promise she had made to her mother - to ensure a peaceful future for the family and the unity of the siblings. The solution was to sell the company, even if some of the siblings were unhappy. Sônia gathered her siblings together and, in a vote, managed to get eight votes in favor of the sale. In 2013, she was elected by the American magazine Forbes as the sixth most powerful business woman in Brazil.
