= Bonifácio Piccinini =

Brazilian archbishop (1929–2020)

Bonifácio Piccinini SDB
- Archbishop of Cuiabá
- Church: Catholic Church
- Archdiocese: Archdiocese of Cuiabá
- In office: 15 August 1981 – 9 June 2004
- Predecessor: Orlando Chaves
- Successor: Mílton Antônio dos Santos
- Previous posts: Titular Archbishop of Turres in Byzacena (1975-1981); Coadjutor Archbishop of Cuiabá (1975-1981)

Orders
- Ordination: 11 February 1960
- Consecration: 31 August 1975 by Carmine Rocco

Personal details
- Born: 13 May 1929 Luiz Alves, Santa Catarina, Republic of the United States of Brazil
- Died: 28 November 2020 (aged 91) Cuiabá, Mato Grosso, Brazil

Bonifácio Piccinini S.D.B. (13 May 1929 – 28 November 2020) was a Brazilian Roman Catholic archbishop.

Piccinini was born in Luiz Alves, Brazil and was ordained to the priesthood in 1960. He served as titular archbishop of Turres in Byzacena and as coadjutor archbishop of the Roman Catholic Archdiocese of Cuiabá Brazil, from 1975 to 1981 and as archbishop of the archdiocese from 1981 to 2004.

Piccinini died from COVID-19 on 28 November 2020 in Cuiabá.
