= Church of Our Lady of the Good Death (Cuiabá) =

- Igreja da Nossa Senhora da Boa Morte
- Location within Brazil
- 15.594061°S 56.097842°W
- Location: Cuiabá
- Address: Praça Antônio Correa, s/n - Centro, Cuiabá - MT, 78045-310
- Country: Brazil
- Language: Portuguese
- Denomination: Roman Catholic
- Tradition: Roman Rite

History
- Founded: ca. 1810

Architecture
- Functional status: Active
- Style: Portuguese colonial
- Completed: ca. 1810

Administration
- Archdiocese: Roman Catholic Archdiocese of Cuiabá

The Church of Our Lady of the Good Death (Portuguese: Igreja da Nossa Senhora da Boa Morte, now known as the Church of Our Lady of the Good Death and Glory (Portuguese: Igreja Nossa Senhora da Boa Morte e da Glória)) is a 19th-century Roman Catholic church in Cuiabá, Mato Grosso, Brazil. The church is dedicated to Our Lady of Help and belongs to the Roman Catholic Archdiocese of Cuiabá. The church was built in a simple, Portuguese colonial style, likely around 1810, by the Brotherhood of Our Lady of the Good Death. Unlike other colonial and Imperial-period architecture in Cuiaba, its appearance remains unchanged from its initial construction in the 19th century. The festival day of Our Lady of Glory and Good Death is celebrated on August 15, a tradition continued from the founding of the church. It is now managed by the Franciscans, who celebrate a feast day dedicated to Saint Anthony (Anthony of Padua) on June 13th.

The church was listed as a state-level listed historic structure by Mato Grosso in 1984. It is additionally a component of the federally-designated Historic Center of Cuiabá, listed by the National Institute of Historic and Artistic Heritage (IPHAN) in 1993.

== Location ==
The Church of Our Lady of the Good Death is located on Praça Antônio Corrêa, a public square in the Historic Center of Cuiabá. The church is located in close proximity to other historic structures and sites in the historic center: the Casa dos Frades is located behind the church; the Piedade Cemetery is located a block north; the numerous historic structures on Avenida Getúlio Vargas, Praça da República, and Praça Alencastro are located a short distance southeast.

== History ==
The church was built by the Brotherhood of Our Lady of Good Death (Portuguese: Irmandade Nossa Senhora da Boa Morte) around 1810. Catholic brotherhoods were formed for church burials and social protectors of their members; and in the rigidly socially stratified society of colonial and Imperial Brazil, the brotherhoods were separated by race. The Brotherhood of Our Lady of Good Death was made up of mixed-race ("pardo") residents, freed Afro-Brazilians, and enslaved Africans. It raised alms via religious festivals and processions on the 14th and 15th of August of each year, dates associated with Our Lady of Glory and Good Death.

The church was renovated in the 20th century. Its procession and festival dedicated to Our Lady of Glory and Good Death is still celebrated, as during its early history, on August 15. A procession takes place on the Saturday closest to this date followed by a luncheon the following day. Priests of the Franciscan order manage the church. The Franciscan introduced a feast day dedicated to Saint Anthony on June 13th; they hold a procession, an open-air mass, and a fair.

== Structure ==
The Brotherhood built a simple church in the Portuguese colonial style. The exterior of the church, unlike others colonial- and imperial-period buildings in Cuiabá, retains it original, austere appearance. The façade is divided into three parts vertically by pilasters, with a single portal at the center. The upper part of the façade has four windows at the choir level, surmounted by a simple triangular pediment.

Churches in colonial and Imperial period ideally had two bell towers flanking the façade. The Brotherhood of Our Lady of Good Death built a bell tower flanking the left of the structure, but it collapsed at end of the 19th century during a heavy storm. A right tower was never built; the structure now lacks a bell tower to the left or right.

The church opens to a Praça Antônio Corrêa, a public square. It is now used as a daily parking lot, and the weight and movement of vehicles have caused damaged to the sidewalk and façade of the church. The church has been variously damaged by termites, cracks, and electrical problems.

== Interior ==
The interior church has a single nave, choir, and chancel. It has three altars: a high altar in the chancel, and two side altars flanking the chancel. The church has a painting by José Maria Hidalgo, a Spanish artist who lived in Cuiabá at the end of the 19th century. The oil painting depicts Our Lady of Mount Carmel and is dated 1885.

== Protected status ==
The Church of Our Lady of the Good Death was listed as a state-level historic structure by the State Secretary for Culture, Sports and Leisure of Mato Grosso (Secretaria de Estado de Cultura, Esporte e Lazer de Mato Grosso, SECEL) under listing no. 61/83 published January 1, 1984.

== Access ==
The Church of Our Lady of the Good Death is open to the public and may be visited. A single mass is held at 6:30 am on Saturdays.
