= Mato Grosso Academy of Letters =

Literary society in Cuiabá, Brazil

- Academia Brasileira de Letras (AML)
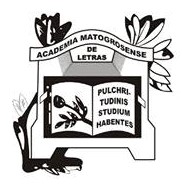
- Formation: May 22, 1921
- Founder: Francisco de Aquino Correia, José de Mesquita
- Headquarters: House of the Baron of Melgaço
- Official language: Portuguese
- President: Sueli Batista dos Santos
- Website: academiamtdeletras.com.br
- Formerly called: Mato Grosso Center for Letters

The Mato Grosso Academy of Letters (Portuguese: Academia Mato-grossense de Letras, AML), is a literary society in Cuiabá, Mato Grosso, Brazil. The academy was founded on May 22, 1921, as the Mato Grosso Center for Letters (Portuguese: Centro Matogrossense de Letras), largely through the efforts of Dom Francisco de Aquino Correia, Archbishop of Cuiabá, and the lawyer José de Mesquita. Its creation was inspired by founding of the Geographical and Historic Institute of Mato Grosso in 1919.

The organization changed its name to the Mato Grosso Academy of Letters on October 22, 1932. Both the academy and the Geographical and Historic Institute of Mato Grosso are headquartered at the House of the Baron of Melgaço, a listed historic building in Cuiabá, and the former residence of Augusto Leverger, Baron of Melgaço, a pioneer in the literature of Mato Grosso.

== Noted members ==
- Francisco de Aquino Correia (1892-1961), Archbishop of Cuiabá and first member of the Brazilian Academy of Letters from Mato Grosso
- José de Mesquita (1892-1961), jurist, fiction writer, and historian
- Dunga Rodrigues (1908-2001), musician, author, and folklorist
