= Guiratinga =

- Municipality
- Guiratinga
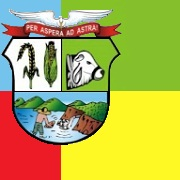
- Flag
- Motto: Per Aspera Ad Astra - If Reaches For Rough Paths of Glory
- Location of Guiratinga

- Location within Brazil
- Coordinates: 16°20′56″S 53°45′28″W
- Country: Brazil Brazil
- Region: Central-West
- State: Mato Grosso
- Mesoregion: Sudeste Mato-Grossense (IBGE/2008 )
- Microregion: Tesouro (IBGE/2008 )
- Founded: August 02, 1933
- Founder: Augusto Alves
- Vizinhos: Tesouro, Torixoréu, Araguainha, Alto Garças, Pedra Preta, São José do Povo, Poxoréo e Pontal do Araguaia

Government
  - Mayor: Hélio Goulart (DEM, since 2008)

Area
  - Total: 5,358.322 km^{2} (2,068.860 sq mi)
- Elevation: 510 m (1,670 ft)

Population (2020)
  - Total: 15,245
  - Density: 2.8451/km^{2} (7.3688/sq mi)
- Demonym: Guiratinguense
- Time zone: UTC−3 (BRT)
- Zip Code: 78760-000
- Area code: 66
- Climate: Tropical
- Distance from capital (Cuiabá): 317 km
- Website: www.guiratinga.mt.gov.br

Guiratinga (also known as Princess Eastern and initially as Lageado) is a city in the state of Mato Grosso, Brazil, distant about 320 miles from the capital Cuiabá. Like many cities in the region, its foundation is directly linked to mining activity that began in the 1920s.

== Etymology ==
It originates from the Tupi "Guira / gyra," which means, bird, bird or heron + "tinga", relating to the color white, white, clear, white heron.

== History ==
The story must be told Guiratinga from the nineteenth century (1890) by Sinalada raids Antônio Cândido de Carvalho, through Eastern Mato Grosso, pioneering and helping build several villages.

Then the Salesian Mission in Brazil, established to 06.18.1894, one of its dependencies in place called "Merure" in the center of the Bororo Indians, and this dependence was named "Colony Indigenous Sacred Heart of Jesus" under the direction of Father John Duroure of French origin.

Thanks to the persistent work of the Salesian Fathers and Daughters of Mary Help of Christians, who managed to pacify the Bororo was it possible to make the area habitable by white civilization.

In 1895, came to this northern region and Northeast, which had burrowing themselves in the forests and savannahs in search of rubber trees and the famous mangabeiras trees that proliferate across the entire Rio Araguaia and Herons and it was very rich in latex. With the shortage of rubber not many migrants returned to the region of origin, preferring to settle here.

By this time, came from Goiás and Minas families Moraes, Cajango and Balbino who settled in the region in order to explore the creation of cattle and subsistence farming.

João José de Moraes was Cajango with nickname "Cajango" miner, who was employed on the farm of his father Bravista realized that the gravel found there was very similar to their homeland, and this similarity began to investigate the possible existence of diamonds in the region. In one of these investigations, an Indian Bororo, said at the confluence of Cassununga Herons and there were many glistening pebbles, which the Indians denominated in toricuiêgo.

Knowing the finding, Cajango used to tell these stories and other people who passed by.

In the year 1900, passes through the farm Boa Vista, a Bahian name Sezilo Feliciano dos Santos, who hears all aware of stories told by Cajango.

Feliciano, stimulated by it decides to fix the port indicated by the Bororo Indians, i.e., at the confluence of Cassununga and herons, that already by 1908, but Feliciano did not install yourself, brought a group of people among whom his wife, Jane Frances of Jesus.

One day, Jane Frances washing dishes in the river Cassununga feels a gravel different from others smote the dish, this small sample was taken to the farm Boa Vista and undertook to send Cajango analyze it and found to be diamond.

The group Sezilo leaned hard on mining, which extract more carats and carat diamond. Thus was founded the first mining in the region.

The news of the discovery of diamonds in Lageado quickly spread throughout the country, and waves of adventurers, notably the Northeast, Goiás and Minas Gerais flocked to this region of Mato Grosso causing the emergence of towns as Santa Rita do Araguaia, Lageado High Egrets, Herons Bar, Poxoréo, Itiquira and others.

=== Foundation of the City ===
The foundation Guiratinga due to mining Augusto Alves, who was recognized in 1920 when the region along with his family reached the banks of the stream Lageadinho and settled on a ranch thatch; shortly afterwards built a beautiful home on the shores Stream Seminar, which serve as the starting point for the future city of Lageado.

Augusto Alves was gradually contacting residents who lived in the area, as well as those who came to settle there, marking them a lot, always obeying an urban layout commanded to build their homes, making Guiratinga, while being a city built by miners, obey the route of a planned city.

== Political Aspects ==
Gone until 1929, although Guiratinga getting a sharp stream of people from Minas Gerais, Goiás and the diamond washings of Bahia, was known simply as "village of Lageado", and belonged to the municipality of Santa Rita do Araguaia.

With the operation of a gravel surfaced, and excavations gave abundant quantities of diamonds in the mines of the Herons Lageado improved and grew significantly and 25.09.1929, under State Law No. 1023 passed the village category, being named Vila Paved .

As intensified the mining of rivers Herons and Flag, plus emptied the mining population established in Santa Rita do Araguaia, then the seat of its municipality.

Lageado developed rapidly, people from everywhere here was established, which emphasized rapid growth to the point of the August 2, 1933 have been and taken to city, by ordinance State No. 291 with this decree, Lageado spent the condition of the district seat of a municipality that was not his, or rather, a municipality that had the name of Santa Rita do Araguaia ... But this fact did not last long.

With the elevation of the condition Lageado district county seat, Santa Rita do Araguaia, entered into deep decay, the political, economic and social.

With the political emancipation, the then mayor of Santa Rita do Araguaia, Dr. Julian Jose da Silva, was taking office in Lageado most did not, and was appointed 1st Lieutenant. Francisco Fernandes dos Santos, who shortly afterwards ended tragically killed in Cuiabá, assuming the office of mayor Manoel Cruz.

=== Ordinance Establishing Its Own City ===
In 1938, there was an incident in the life of Lageado, under Decree-Law No. 145 of 29.03.1938 the city becomes the seat of its own municipality, i.e. Lageado. Ended up as the absurdity of Lageado be the county seat of Santa Rita do Araguaia.

=== Law Decree Changing Name Of City ===
After the Second World War a decree Federal Law had sought to prevent the country towns with the same name as there was already a town by the name of Gaucho Lageado, citizens from all walks of life gathered at the headquarters of the Commercial Association to discuss the changing the name of the city in Assembly had adopted the name "Guiratinga" which in Tupi-Guarani has the meaning of "White Crane", abundant bird in the region. Was by Decree-Law No. 545 of State 12/31/1943 city was renamed definitely Guiratinga.

The occupation of the region stemmed from dealing in gold mining region of eastern Mato Grosso. The first name of the town was Lageadinho, terms of geographical origin, in reference to the stream of the same name, which was approaching the corrutela basically formed by miners and Goiás.

== Location ==
Highways serving the city of Guiratinga - MT 270 - fully paved and signposted, joining up with the BR 163 and BR 364, connecting the cities, Guiratinga the bar Herons, Rondonopolis and Cuiaba.

MT 110 - Connects to BR 070, connecting the cities of Alto Herons, Treasury, Primavera do Leste, Goiânia. MT 107 - Connects to MT 130 and BR 070, connecting the municipalities of Poxoréo, Primavera do Leste.

== Distances from ==
- Rondonópolis 110 km
- Cuiabá 317 km
- Tesouro 462 km
- Barra do Garças 240 km
- Brasília 800 km
- Primavera do Leste 186 km

== Diocese of Guiratinga ==
The Diocese of Guiratinga (Dioecesis Guiratingensis) is an ecclesiastical circumscription of the Catholic Church in Brazil, belonging to the Ecclesiastical Province of Cuiabá and the West II Regional Bishops' Council of the National Conference of Bishops of Brazil, being a suffragan of the Archdiocese of Cuiabá. The episcopal see is the Cathedral St. John the Baptist in the city of Guiratinga in the state of Mato Grosso.

=== Brief history ===
The Prelature of the Araguaia registry was created May 12, 1914 by decree of the Sacred Congregation Concistorial, spun off from the Archdiocese of Cuiabá. Was entrusted by the Holy See to the care the Society of St. Francis de Sales.

- 1st Bishop Prelate: Don Antonio Malan - SDB - (1914-1924)
- Apostolic Administrator: Mons. Conturon John the Baptist (1924 - 1937)
- 2nd Bishop Prelate: Bishop Jose Selva - SDB (1937-1956)
- 3rd Bishop Prelate: Bishop Camilo Faresin - SDB (1956-1969)

On May 27, 1969, Pope Paul VI moved the headquarters to the city of Guiratinga, changing its name to the Prelature of Guiratinga.

- Bishop Prelate of Guiratinga: Don Camillo Faresin - SDB (1969 - 1981)

On October 3, 1981, by the Bull "Institutionis Propositum" of Pope John Paul II, was elevated to a diocese.

Bispos	Period
Dom Derek John Christopher Byrne, SPS	2009-Currently
Dom Frei Sebastião Assis de Figueiredo, OFM	2001-2007
Dom José Foralosso, SDB	1992-1999
Dom Camillo Faresin, SDB	1981-1992

Location and Demographics
Geographic Location: Southeast of Mato Grosso
Limits: Diocese of San Luis Montes Beautiful - GO, Jatahy - GO, Prelature Cushion - MS, Diocese of Rondonópolis - MT, Prelature of Paranatinga - MT, Diocese of Barra do Herons - MT.
Surface: 44693.5 km2
Population: 120 626 inhabitants (IBGE 2000).
Population density: 2,70 inhabitants per km²
Number of Parishes: 15
Priests: 20
Proportion Priest / Population: 1/6.031, 3

Municipalities

- Alto Araguaia
- Alto Taquari
- Alto Garças
- Araguainha
- Dom Aquino
- Guiratinga
- Jarudore
- Ponte Branca
- Poxoréo
- Primavera do Leste
- Ribeirãozinho
- Tesouro
- Torixoréo
