= Diocese of Barra do Garças =

Catholic ecclesiastical territory

Coordinates: 15.8886°S 52.2669°W

Diocese of Barra do Garças Dioecesis Barragartiensis Diocese de Barra do Garças

Location
- Country: Brazil
- Ecclesiastical province: Cuiabá
- Metropolitan: Cuiabá

Statistics
- Area: 59,840 km^{2} (23,100 sq mi)
- Population: Total; Catholics: (as of 2004); 204,000; 159,500 (78.2%)

Information
- Rite: Latin Rite
- Established: 27 February 1982 (44 years ago)
- Cathedral: Cathedral of Our Lady of Guidance in Barra do Garças

Current leadership
- Pope: Leo XIV
- Bishop: Paulo Renato Fernandes Gonçalves de Campos
- Metropolitan Archbishop: Mário Antônio da Silva
- Bishops emeritus: Protógenes José Luft

Website
- Website of the Diocese

The Roman Catholic Diocese of Barra do Garças (Latin: Dioecesis Barragartiensis) is a diocese located in the city of Barra do Garças in the ecclesiastical province of Cuiabá in Brazil.

== History ==
- February 27, 1982: Established as Diocese of Barra do Garças from the Diocese of Guiratinga

== Bishops ==
- Bishops of Barra do Garças (Latin Rite)
  - Antônio Sarto, S.D.B. (1982.03.25 – 2001.05.23)
  - Protógenes José Luft, S.d.C. (2001.05.23 – present)

=== Coadjutor bishop ===
- Protógenes José Luft, S.d.C.(2000-2001)
