= Dunga Rodrigues =

Brazilian educator and author

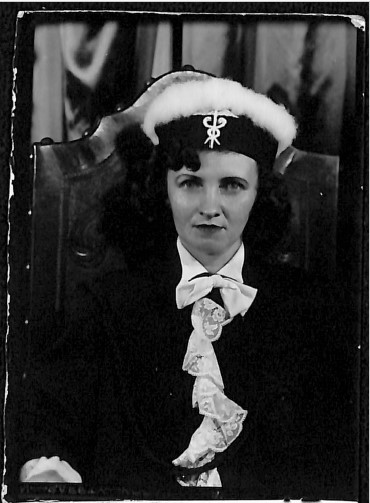
- Dunga Rodrigues (1908-2001)
- Born: Maria Benedita Deschamps Rodrigues; July 15, 1908; Cuiabá, Brazil
- Died: January 8, 2001 (aged 92); Santos, Brazil
- Resting place: Porto Cemetery, Cuiabá
- Occupations: musician, memoirist, and author

Dunga Rodrigues, born Maria Benedita Deschamps Rodrigues, (Cuiabá, Brazil, July 15, 1908 – Santos, Brazil, January 8, 2001) was a Brazilian teacher, musician, memoirist, and author. She established herself as a historian and writer of the culture, history, and literature of the state of Mato Grosso in the 20th century. Rodrigues held a chair at the Mato Grosso Academy of Letters, a rarity for a woman at the time.

== Biography ==
Dunga Rodrigues dedicated her early studies to literature and music. She was educated at the Barão de Melgaço Normal School and the Liceu Cuiabano, both schools for the elite of Mato Grosso. She graduated in piano from the Mato Grosso Musical Conservatory and the Brazilian Conservatory of Music in Rio de Janeiro. Rodrigues ultimately graduated as an accountant from the Cuiabá Technical School of Commerce.

She taught French and music, performed recitals, and wrote several books about the culture and history of Cuiabá and Mato Grosso. She was a member of the Geographical and Historic Institute of Mato Grosso and the Association of Graduates of the Escola Superior de Guerra. She was known as a storyteller of the culture and folklore of the greater Cuiabá region, as well as having a deep knowledge of rasqueado, an element of Cuiabá's intangible heritage. The artist Maria Aparecida Acosta wrote a book about Dunga, highlighting that she was a happy and communicative person, leaving a great cultural legacy through her books and music.

== Personal life ==
Dunga Rodrigues was born to Firmo José Rodrigues and Maria Rita Deschamps Rodrigues. Her father had a career in the Brazilian military and was a noted figure in Cuiabá. Firmo José Rodrigues was an activist, writer, and teacher; he later embarked on a political career. The family was in good financial condition, and allowed Dunga Rodrigues to travel widely within Brazil and abroad. Her admiration for her father was a great influence on her intellectuality and human sensitivity.

Dunga Rodrigues died on January 8, 2001, Three Kings Day, in Santos, São Paulo. Rodrigues was recovering from cardiac problems in an hospital, received a discharge and died shortly afterwards. She was cremated and her ashes were buried in the Porto Cemetery (Cemitério do Porto) of Cuiabá.

== Works ==
- Uma aventura em Mato Grosso (1984),
- Reminiscências de Cuiabá, in commemoration of the 250th anniversary of Cuiabá
- Marphysa
- Os Vizinhos, Cuiabá: roteiro de lendas
- Memória Musical da Cuiabania (in 4 volumes)
- Lendas de Mato Grosso
- Cuiabá ao longo de cem anos, co-authored with Maria de Arruda Müller
- Colcha de Retalhos and Movimento musical em Cuiabá.
