= Francisco de Aquino Correia =

Brazilian archbishop, politician, politician, cultural figure

Francisco de Aquino Correia S.D.B.
- Archbishop of Cuiabá
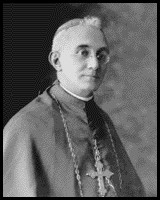
- Dom Francisco de Aquino Correia
- Church: Roman Catholic Church
- Archdiocese: Cuiabá
- Appointed: August 26, 1921
- Installed: April 16, 1922
- Predecessor: Carlos Luís d'Amour
- Successor: Orlando Chaves
- Other post: Titular bishop of Prusias ad Hypium

Personal details
- Born: April 2, 1885 Cuiabá, Empire of Brazil
- Died: March 22, 1956 (aged 70) São Paulo, Brazil
- Occupation: Roman Catholic archbishop, politician, cultural figure

President of Mato Grosso
- In office January 22, 1918 – January 22, 1922
- Preceded by: Cipriano da Costa Ferreira (as federal intervenor)
- Succeeded by: Pedro Celestino

Francisco de Aquino Correia (April 2, 1885 – March 22, 1956) was a Brazilian Catholic prelate, poet, and politician. He was the tenth archbishop of Cuiabá, president (governor) of the state of Mato Grosso^{A} from 1918 to 1922, and a leading cultural figure of the state in the early 20th century. Aquino Correia was an accomplished poet and writer and became the first citizen of Mato Grosso native to belong to the Brazilian Academy of Letters. He was also one of the founding members of the Mato Grosso Academy of Letters (Academia Mato-grossense de Letras) and the Mato Grosso Historical and Geographical Institute (Instituto Histórico e Geográfico de Mato Grosso).

Aquino Correia was instrumental in the construction of the Eucharistic Shrine of Our Lady of Good Delivery, a Neogothic church resembling the Notre Dame in Paris, but not other structures in the city. It sits above the Historic Center of Cuiabá, is visible from many points in the city, and became a landmark from its inception.

Aquino Correia was popularly known as "a genius and a saint" (um gênio e um santo) for his contributions to Mato Grosso; at the same time, he was criticized for his handling of land use and public works as governor of the state. Aquino Correia became an associate of president Getúlio Vargas (1930–1945) and was sympathetic to the Estado Novo (1937–1946); he represented the Catholic Church in events of the Vargas regime and used his influence to solidify the relationship between the Catholic Church and the Brazilian state.

== Early life ==
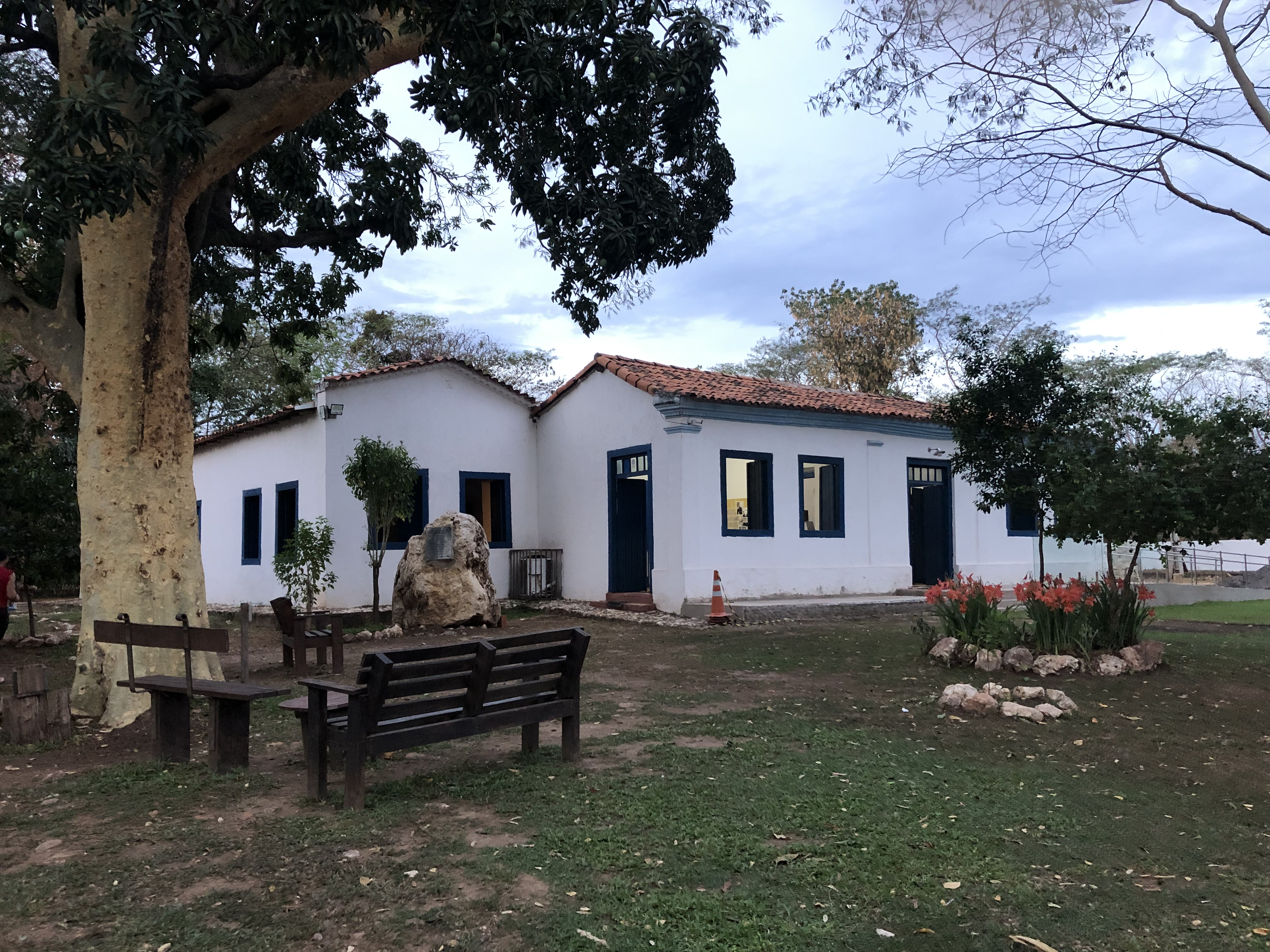
Casa Dom Aquino, birthplace of Dom Aquino Correia, now the Mato Grosso Museum of Natural History

Dom Aquino Correia was the son of colonel Antônio Tomás de Aquino Correia and Maria de Aleluia Guadie Ley (1847–1890), daughter of Joaquim Gaudie Ley and granddaughter of André Gaudie Ley. Antônio Tomás de Aquino Correia held various government positions, including service as a provincial deputy and a deputy federal judge, manager of the Caixa Econômica, inspector of the Provincial Treasury, and administrator of the Post Office.

Aquino Correia was born in the former Murtinho family home on the Fazenda Bela Vista, a plantation on the banks of the Cuiabá River. The house is nicknamed "Predestination House" (Casa Predetinada) by historians for producing two of the most important figures in the modern history of Mato Grosso: Joaquim Murtinho and Dom Aquino Correia.^{B} Murtinho, who was born in the residence in 1848, became a pioneer in homeopathic medicine in Brazil and also served as a senator and government minister, being best known for his role as Minister of Finance (1898–1902) under president Campos Sales. The house was listed as a state-level historic structure by the State Secretary for Culture, Sports and Leisure of Mato Grosso (Secretaria de Estado de Cultura, Esporte e Lazer de Mato Grosso) in 1984.

== Education and religious life ==
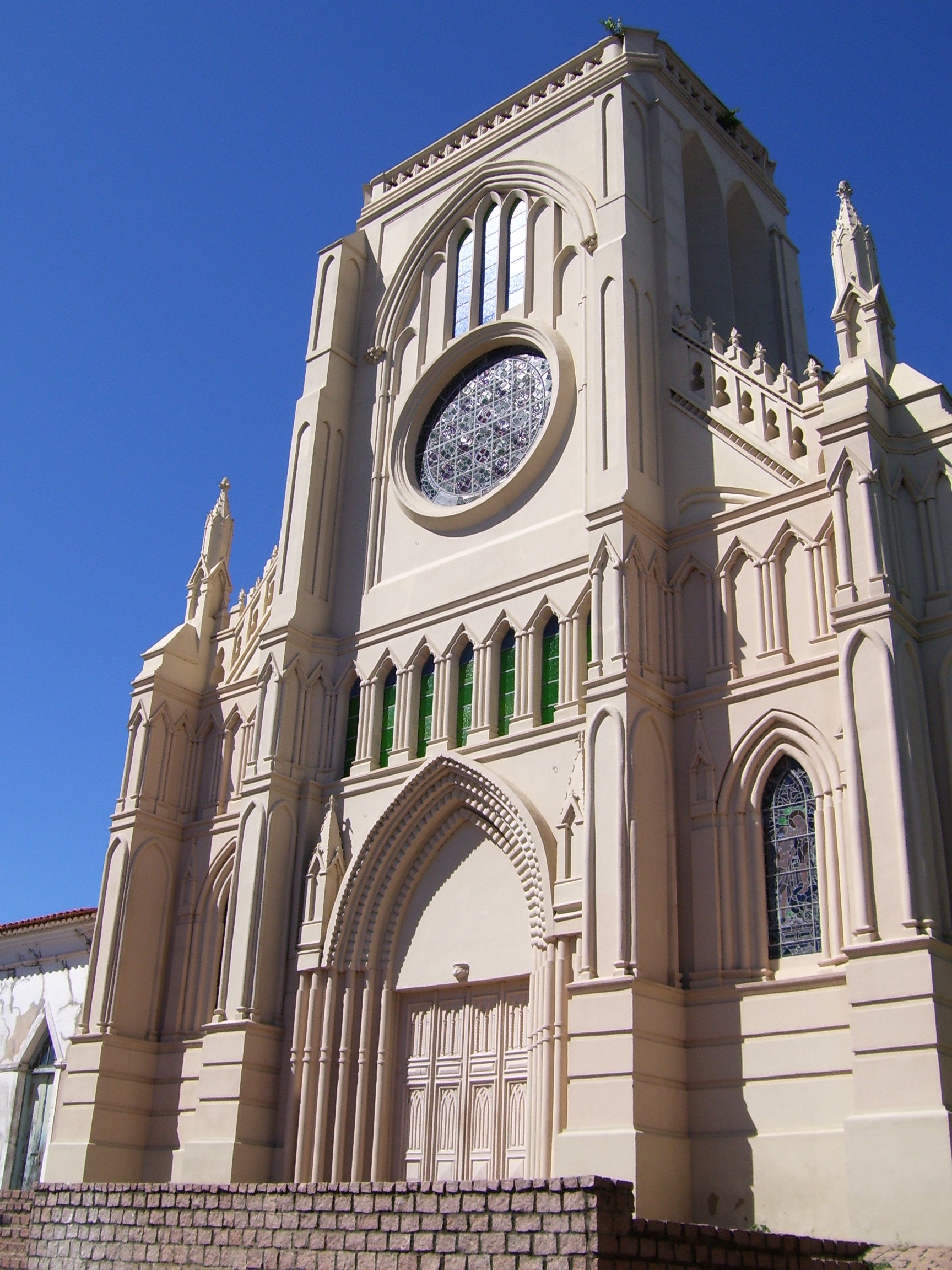
Bom Despacho church

Aquino Correia began his studies at the primary and secondary schools that first emerged in Cuiabá in the late 18th century. He began at Colégio São Sebastião and continued at the newly opened Conceição Seminary at age 10. The Conceição Seminary opened in 1882 was the first secondary school in Mato Grosso, but had fallen into decline by 1895. Aquino Correia completed his education at the Liceu Salesiano de São Gonçalo, where he received a bachelor's degree in humanities.

Correia entered the Novitiate of the Salesians of Dom Bosco in Cuiabá in 1902, and took religious vows in the Salesian Congregation in the following year. He went to Rome in 1904 where he studied philosophy and enrolled, simultaneously, at the Pontifical Gregorian University and the Pontifical University of Saint Thomas Aquinas. He would receive his doctorate in theology at Saint Thomas Aquinas University in 1908. On January 17, 1909, having already received all Minor and Major Orders, he was ordained a priest.

Dom Aquino Correia returned to Brazil after his ordination. He was appointed director of the Liceu Salesiano de Cuiabá, a position he held until 1914. He was appointed bishop by Pope Pius on January 1, 1915, at the age of 29, making him the youngest bishop in the world. Pope Benedict XV conferred the titles of Assistant to the Pontifical Sole and Count Palatine on Aquino Correia in 1919. In 1921, with the death of Archbishop Dom Carlos Luís de Amour, he was elevated to the Archbishopric of Cuiabá, receiving the Archbishop's Pallium from the hands of Dom Leopoldo Duarte e Silva, Archbishop of São Paulo.

== Political career ==
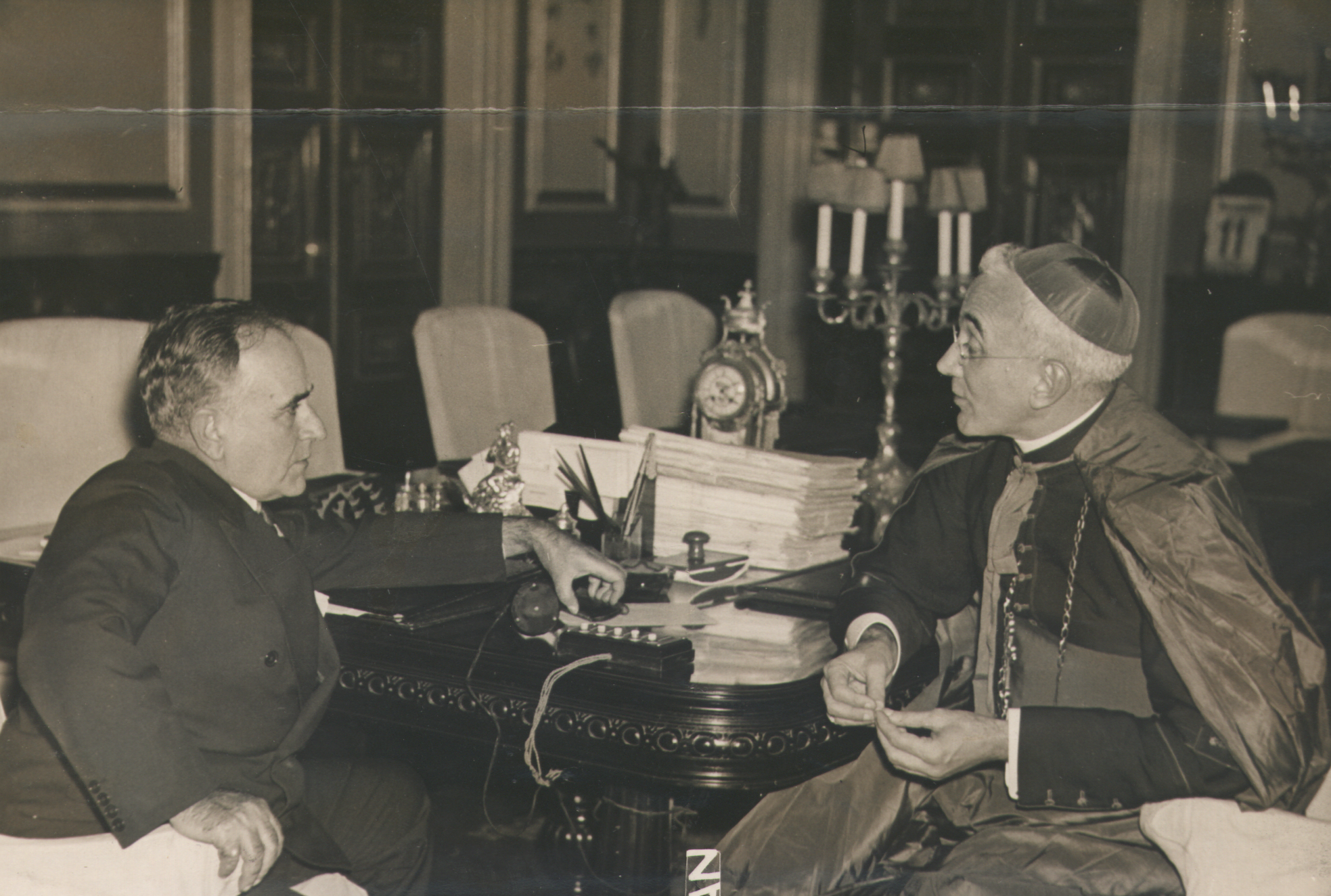
President Getúlio Vargas and Dom Aquino Correia, 1938

Aquino Correia was elected as President of Mato Grosso in 1918, a post equivalent to a governor, and served in the post until 1922. He inherited problems of the consolidation of the policies of the First Brazilian Republic (1889–1930) and was involved in a land controversy in Mato Grosso in 1921. The federal government of Brazil offered land for colonization to American businessmen in Mato Grosso. They subsequently recruited African Americans to colonize the lands, which led Aquino Correia to immediately cancel the negotiation. The Ministry of Foreign Affairs of Brazil, as a preventive measure, then prioritized European immigration to Brazil and excluded people of African descent from immigration and settlement schemes. Aquino Correia was also confronted with the problem of undeveloped "empty spaces", as well as underdevelopment in public works—river navigation, roads, education, and public health.

Aquino Correia drew close to the administration of president Getúlio Vargas (1930–1945) due to the conservative nature of the Catholic Church. He was sympathetic to the Estado Novo (1937–1946), and sought a closer relation between church and state. Aquino Correia led commemorations and events for the regime, including a thanksgiving mass on the 10th anniversary of the Vargas dictatorship.

== Cultural activities ==
Dom Aquino promoted cultural initiatives in Mato Grosso upon his return from Rome. He founded the Mato Grosso Academy of Letters, served as president from, and was unanimously acclaimed President of Honor. He also co-founded the Historical and Geographic Institute of Mato Grosso, of which he was elected Perpetual President. Both associations were relocated to the House of the Baron of Melgaço, donated by the State of Mato Grosso in 1931.

Dom Aquino also created the Coat of Arms of Mato Grosso, which was adopted by the state under Resolution no. 799 of August 14, 1918. It features the mythology of the origin of Mato Grosso, its economy and people; it is placed on a Portuguese-style shield that bears the image of a hill, described as "golden hill". He additionally wrote the state Hymn of Mato Grosso.

=== Brazilian Academy of Letters ===
Dom Aquino was the fourth occupant of seat 34 of the Brazilian Academy of Letters (Portuguese: Academia Brasileira de Letras). He was elected to the seat on December 9, 1926, in succession to Lauro Müller. He was received at the academy by Ataulfo de Paiva on November 30, 1927.

== Construction of the Eucharistic Shrine of Our Lady of Good Delivery ==
The Church of Our Lady of Good Delivery (Portuguese: Igreja de Nossa Senhora do Bom Despacho), located next to the Conceição Seminary, was one of the first churches built in Cuiabá. Friar Ignácio Gau collaborated with the French engineer Georges Mousnier, the Count of Manoir, to replace the Portuguese colonial-era chapel with a radically different structure: a Neogothic church resembling the Notre Dame in Paris. Dom Aquino supported the project and attended the laying of the foundation stone on September 8, 1918, during his tenure as President of Mato Grosso. He also advocated that it be renamed the Eucharistic Shrine of Our Lady of Good Delivery (Portuguese: Santuário Eucarístico de Nossa Senhora do Bom Despacho), and its façade reoriented in line with the façade of the Conceição Seminary. The new church differed in material, size, and style from the original, and most buildings in Cuiabá; its placement above the Historic Center of Cuiabá, however, made it a familiar landmark in the city.

== Residence at the Conceição Seminary ==
Dom Aquino Correia left the state government in 1922 and moved to the Conceição Seminary, where he had completed his secondary education. He remained there for 34 years. The seminary now functions as the Sacred Art Museum of Mato Grosso. Its collection includes numerous artifacts of Aquino Correia's life, including his clothing, personal effects, and artwork.

== Death and burial ==
Dom Aquino Correia died in São Paulo on March 22, 1956. His remains were placed in the crypt of the Cathedral Basilica of the Good Lord Jesus in Cuiabá. The cathedral was completed in 1973, and the crypt was located below a belltower of the structure. He is interred in the crypt along with some of the most important figures in the history of Mato Grosso: Francisco de Aquino Correia, Pascoal Moreira Cabral Leme, and Miguel Sutil, early settlers of Cuiabá; and Carlos Luís d'Amour, José Antônio dos Reis, Orlando Chaves, Benedito Calixto Neto, José Maria Macerata, Luiz de Castro Pereira, noted clergy of the city.

== Noted works ==
Dom Aquino Correia was a prolific writer, publishing works of poetry, speeches, history, and geography. His pastoral letters have been partially published, but his essays and conference publications remain unpublished. His poetry emerged from his work on sermon writing and focused on themes of nature and the place of Brazilians within their geography. The scholar José Carlos de Macedo Soares stated^{C}:

There is, in D. Aquino's poetry, a strong lyricism that combines well with his descriptive power, not only when he narrates an episode, but also when he invokes a landscape or simply a lively emotion.

Aquino Correia wrote primarily in Portuguese, but also in French, Italian and Latin.

- Odes (poetry, two volumes, 1917)
- O Brasil em Genebra (history, 1919)
- Terra natal (poetry, 1920)
- A flor d'aleluia (poetry, 1926)
- Discursos (oratory, 1927)
- O Brasil novo (speech, 1932)
- Castro Alves e os moços (speech, 1933)
- Oração aos soldados (speech, 1937)
- O Padre Antônio Vieira (speech, date unknown)
- Nova et vetera (poetry, 1947)
- A fronteira de Mato Grosso/Goiás

== Footnotes ==
A.The state of Mato Grosso in the lifetime of Aquino Correia included both the present-day states of Mato Grosso and Mato Grosso do Sul; the two were divided in 1977.
B.The house is known as Casa Dom Aquino, despite being both the birthplace of Joaquim Murtinho and Francisco de Aquino Correia.
C.In Portuguese: "Há, na poesia de D. Aquino [...] um forte lirismo que combina bem com o seu poder descritivo, não só quando ele narra um episódio, como também quando invoca uma paisagem ou simplesmente uma viva emoção."
