= José de Mesquita =

- Born: March 10, 1892; Cuiabá, Mato Grosso, Brazil
- Died: June 22, 1961 (aged 69); Cuiabá
- Occupations: Jurist and writer
- Writing career
- Literary movement: Parnassianism, Romanticism

José Barnabé de Mesquita (March 10, 1892, Cuiabá – June 22, 1961, Cuiabá), generally known as José de Mesquita, was a Brazilian poet parnassian, romance and short story writer, historiographer, journalist, essayist, genealogist and jurist.

== Biography ==
José de Mesquita graduated from the Faculty of Law of São Paulo University in 1913. He was later appointed as a judge at the Justice Court by the Mato Grosso State, and was its President for 11 consecutive years (1929–1940).

He was one of the founders of the Geographical and Historic Institute of Mato Grosso in 1919, and the Mato Grosso Academy of Letters in 1921, of which he was both a founding member, and president from its foundation until his death in 1961. De Mesquita's book Mirror of Souls, (stories) was awarded by the Brazilian Academy of Letters in Rio de Janeiro in 1932. He was a correspondent for the Brazilian Historic and Geographic Institute and the Federation of the Academy of Letters of Brazil (both based in Rio de Janeiro), since 1939.

== See also ==
- José de Mesquita (in Brazilian Portuguese Wikipedia)
- Virtual Library José de Mesquita, Bibliography (in Brazilian Portuguese)
