= Diocese of Juína =

Catholic ecclesiastical territory

Coordinates: 11.4185°S 58.7556°W

Diocese of Juína Dioecesis Iuinensis Diocese de Juína

Location
- Country: Brazil
- Ecclesiastical province: Cuiabá
- Metropolitan: Cuiabá

Statistics
- Area: 129,078 km^{2} (49,837 sq mi)
- Population: Total; Catholics: (as of 2006); 140,000; 126,593 (90.4%)

Information
- Rite: Latin Rite
- Established: 23 December 1997 (28 years ago)
- Cathedral: Cathedral of the Sacred Heart of Jesus in Juína

Current leadership
- Pope: Leo XIV
- Bishop: Neri José Tondello
- Metropolitan Archbishop: Mário Antônio da Silva

The Roman Catholic Diocese of Juína (Latin: Dioecesis Iuinensis) is a diocese located in the city of Juína in the ecclesiastical province of Cuiabá in Brazil.

== History ==
- December 23, 1997: Established as Diocese of Juína from the Diocese of Diamantino and Diocese of Ji-Paraná

== Leadership ==
- Bishops of Juína (Roman rite)
  - Bishop Franco Dalla Valle, S.D.B. (1997.12.23 – 2007.08.02)
  - Archbishop Mílton Antônio dos Santos, S.D.B. (Apostolic Administrator 2007.08 – 2009.02.15)
  - Bishop Neri José Tondello (2009.02.15 - present)
