= Antônio Sarto =

Brazilian bishop of the Roman Catholic Diocese

Antônio Sarto (February 27, 1926 – September 29, 2008) was the Brazilian bishop of the Roman Catholic Diocese of Barra do Garças from his appointment on March 25, 1982, by Pope John Paul II until his retirement on May 23, 2001. He remained Bishop Emeritus of Barra do Garças until his death on September 29, 2008, at the age of 82.

== References and external links ==
- Catholic Hierarchy: Bishop Antônio Sarto, S.D.B. †
