= Franco Dalla Valle =

Franco Dalla Valle [Salesians of Don Bosco|S.D.B.]]
- Bishop of Juína
- Church: Catholic Church
- Diocese: Diocese of Juína
- In office: 3 December 1997 – 2 August 2007
- Predecessor: Diocese erected
- Successor: Neri José Tondello

Orders
- Ordination: 26 August 1972
- Consecration: 6 January 1998 by Pope John Paul II

Personal details
- Born: 2 August 1945 Crespano del Grappa, Province of Treviso, Kingdom of Italy
- Died: 2 August 2007 (aged 62)

Franco Dalla Valle (2 August 1945 – 2 August 2007) was a Brazilian Catholic clergyman and Bishop of Juína.

Valle was born in Crespano del Grappa, Italy. He was ordained on 26 August 1972, and appointed bishop on 23 December 1997. On 7 January 1998, he became an ordained Bishop.

== Resources ==
- Profile at catholic-hierarchy.org
