= Derek John Christopher Byrne =

Irish priest

The Most Reverend Derek John Christopher Byrne SPS
- Bishop emeritus
- Church: Catholic Church
- Diocese: Primavera do Leste–Paranatinga
- Appointed: Diocese of Guiratinga (2008-2014); Diocese of Primavera do Leste–Paranatinga (2014-2023)
- Retired: 4 October 2023

Orders
- Ordination: 1973 by Bishop James Kavanagh
- Consecration: 2 November 2008 by Archbishop Mílton Antônio dos Santos

Personal details
- Born: January 17, 1948 Monkstown, County Dublin, Ireland
- Denomination: Roman Catholic
- Profession: Cleric
- Education: St. Patrick's College, Kiltegan

Derek John Christopher Byrne
- Bishop emeritus
- Church: Catholic Church
- Diocese: Primavera do Leste–Paranatinga
- Appointed: 14 December 2014

Derek John Christopher Byrne SPS (born 17 January 1948) is an Irish prelate of the Catholic Church and a member of the St. Patrick's Missionary Society (Kiltegan Fathers) who was bishop of Primavera do Leste–Paranatinga in Brazil from 2014 to 2023. He was bishop of Guiratinga, Brazil from 2008 to 2014.

== Biography ==
Derek John Christopher Byrne was born on 17 January 1948 in Monkstown, Dublin. He attended Newbridge College.

He studied at University College Cork, earning a BA in Philosophy and Theological Studies in St. Patrick's College, Kiltegan, where he was ordained a priest in 1973. Following ordination, he went to Brazil, where he served until 1980. He worked in the US and Ireland in fundraising and leadership positions before going back to Brazil in 2003 as parish priest of Castanheira in the state of Mato Grosso.

On 24 December 2008, Pope Benedict XVI appointed him bishop of Guiratinga in Brazil. He received his episcopal consecration on 23 March 2009.

On 25 June 2014, upon the creation of the new diocese of Primavera do Leste-Paranatinga in Brazil, Pope Francis named Byrne its first bishop.

Pope Francis accepted his resignation on 7 June 2023.

== See also ==
- Catholic Church in Brazil
