= Orlando Chaves (bishop) =

Brazilian Roman Catholic archbishop

Orlando Chaves S.D.B.
- Archbishop of Cuiabá
- Church: Catholic Church
- Archdiocese: Archdiocese of Cuiabá
- In office: 18 December 1956 – 15 August 1981
- Predecessor: Francisco de Aquino Correia
- Successor: Bonifácio Piccinini
- Previous post: Bishop of Corumbá (1948-1956)

Orders
- Ordination: 10 July 1927
- Consecration: 27 May 1948 by Carlo Chiarlo

Personal details
- Born: 17 February 1900 Campina Verde, Minas Gerais, Republic of the United States of Brazil
- Died: 15 August 1981 (aged 81)

Orlando Chaves S.D.B. (17 February 1900 – 15 August 1981) was a Brazilian Roman Catholic archbishop.

Chaves was born in Brazil and was ordained to the priesthood in 1927. He served as bishop of the Roman Catholic Diocese of Corumbá, Brazil, from 1948 to 1956 and as archbishop of the Roman Catholic Archdiocese of Cuiabá, Brazil, from 1956 until his death in 1981.
