= Diocese of Guiratinga =

Diocese of Guiratinga Dioecesis Guiratingensis Diocese de Guiratinga
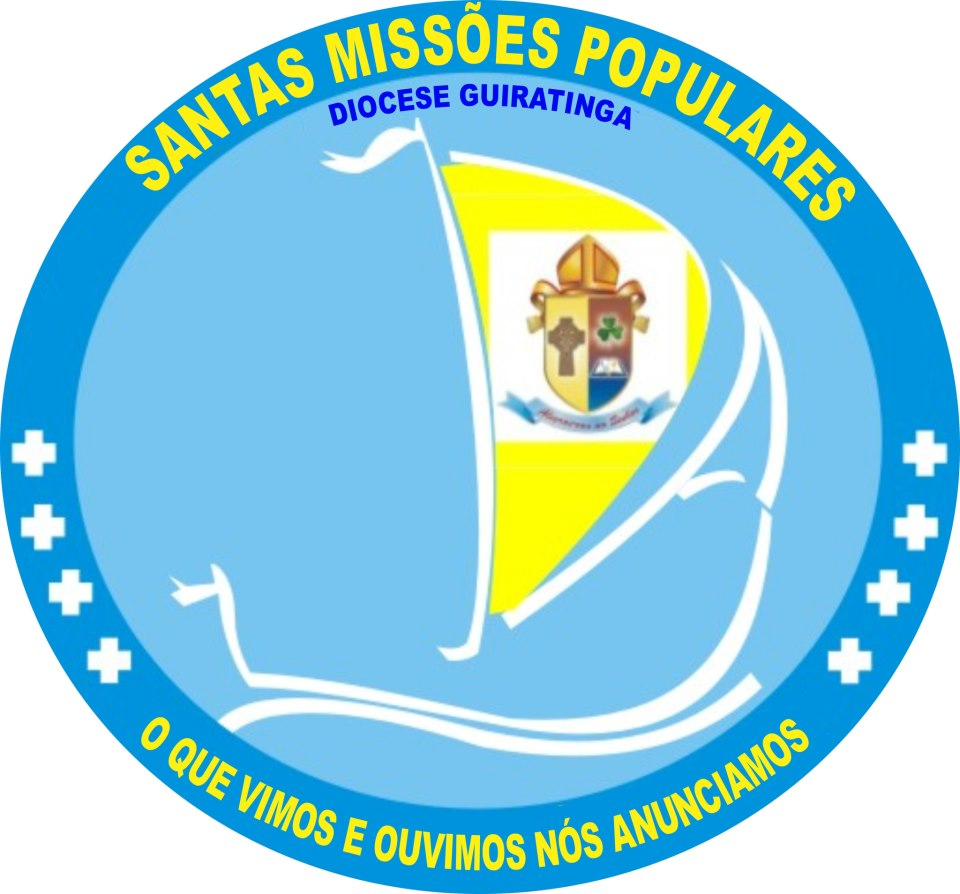

Location
- Country: Brazil
- Ecclesiastical province: Cuiabá
- Metropolitan: Cuiabá

Statistics
- Area: 38,666 km^{2} (14,929 sq mi)
- Population: Total; Catholics: (as of 2006); 153,800; 102,000 (66.3%)

Information
- Rite: Latin Rite
- Established: 12 May 1914 (112 years ago)
- Dissolved: 25 June 2014 (12 years ago)
- Cathedral: Cathedral of St John the Baptist in Guiratinga

Leadership
- Pope: Leo XIV
- Metropolitan Archbishop: Mílton Antônio dos Santos

Website
- Website of the Diocese

The Diocese of Guiratinga (Dioecesis Guiratingensis) was a former ecclesiastical circumscription of the Catholic Church in Brazil, belonging to the Ecclesiastical Province of Cuiabá and the West II Regional Bishops' Council of the National Conference of Bishops of Brazil, being a suffragan of the Archdiocese of Cuiabá. The episcopal see is the Cathedral St. John the Baptist in the city of Guiratinga in the state of Mato Grosso.

The Prelature Registry Araguaia (Territorialis Praelatura Registrensis or Territorialis Praelatura registration Araguaia) was erected on May 12, 1914, by Pope Pius X, by decree of the Sacred Congregation Concistorial [1], from territory taken from the Archdiocese Cuiabá, and delivered by the Holy See to the care of the Salesians. 1st Bishop Prelate: Don Antonio Malan - SDB - (1914-1924) Apostolic Administrator: Mons. Conturon John the Baptist (1924 - 1937) 2nd Bishop Prelate: Bishop Jose Selva - SDB (1937-1956) 3rd Bishop Prelate: Don Camillo Faresin - SDB (1956-1969) Pope Paul VI, on May 27, 1969, changed the name to Prelature of Guiratinga (Territorialis Praelatura Guiratingensis). On October 3, 1981, it was promoted to the rank of diocese by Pope John Paul II.

== History ==
- May 12, 1914: Established as Territorial Prelature of Registro do Araguaia from the Metropolitan Archdiocese of Cuiabá
- June 15, 1957: Lost territory to establish Diocese of Campo Grande
- May 13, 1969: Lost territory to establish Territorial Prelature of São Félix
- May 27, 1969: Renamed as Territorial Prelature of Guiratinga
- October 3, 1981: Promoted as Diocese of Guiratinga
- February 27, 1982: Lost territory to establish Diocese of Barra do Garças
- June 25, 2014: Suppressed to the Diocese of Rondonopolis (renamed Rondonopolis - Guiratinga), Diocese of Paranatinga (renamed Primavera do Leste – Parataninga), and Diocese of Barra do Garças

== Leadership ==
- Bishops of Guiratinga (Roman rite)
  - Bishop Derek John Christopher Byrne, S.P.S. (2008.12.24 – 2014.06.25)
  - Bishop Sebastião Assis de Figueiredo, O.F.M. (2001.08.29 – 2007.12.20)
  - Bishop José Foralosso, S.D.B. (1991.11.20 – 2000.01.12)
  - Bishop Camillo Faresin, S.D.B. (1981.10.03 – 1991.11.20)
- Prelates of Guiratinga (Roman Rite)
  - Bishop Camillo Faresin, S.D.B. (1969.05.27 – 1981.10.03)
- Prelates of Registro do Araguaia (Roman Rite)
  - Bishop Camillo Faresin, S.D.B. (1956.09.14 – 1969.05.27)
  - Bishop José Selva, S.D.B. (1937.12.27 – 1956.08.13)
  - Fr. João Batista Conturon, S.D.B. (Apostolic Administrator 1925.07.21 – 1937)
  - Bishop Antônio Malan, S.D.B. (1914.05.25 – 1924.01.03)
