= Diocese of Rondonópolis-Guiratinga =

Catholic ecclesiastical territory

Diocese of Rondonópolis-Guiratinga Dioecesis Rondonopolitanus-Guiratingensis Diocese de Rondonópolis-Guiratinga
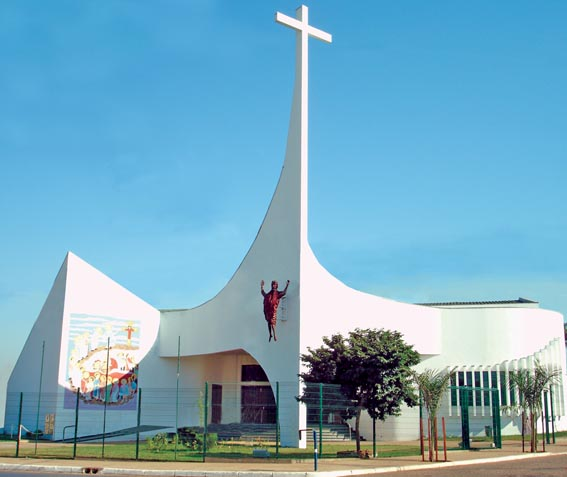
- Cathedral of the Holy Cross in Rondonópolis in 2010

Location
- Country: Brazil
- Ecclesiastical province: Cuiabá
- Metropolitan: Cuiabá

Statistics
- Area: 89,666 km^{2} (34,620 sq mi)
- Population: Total; Catholics: (as of 2010); 444,800; 340,000 (76.4%)

Information
- Rite: Latin Rite
- Established: 13 July 1940 (85 years ago)
- Cathedral: Cathedral of the Holy Cross in Rondonópolis
- Co-cathedral: Co-Cathedral of St. John the Baptist

Current leadership
- Pope: Leo XIV
- Bishop: Maurício da Silva Jardim
- Metropolitan Archbishop: Mário Antônio da Silva

Website
- Website of the Diocese

The Roman Catholic Diocese of Rondonópolis-Guiratinga (Latin: Dioecesis Rondonopolitanus--Guiratingensis) is a diocese located in the city of Rondonópolis in the ecclesiastical province of Cuiabá in Brazil.

== History ==
- July 13, 1940: Established as Territorial Prelature of Chapada from the Metropolitan Archdiocese of Cuiabá
- November 25, 1961: Renamed as Territorial Prelature of Rondonópolis
- February 15, 1986: Promoted as Diocese of Rondonópolis
- June 25, 2014: Renamed as Diocese of Diocese of Rondonópolis-Guiratinga

== Bishops ==
=== Ordinaries, in reverse chronological order ===
- Bishops of Rondonópolis (Roman rite)
  - Bishop Maurício da Silva Jardim (2022.06.08 - present)
  - Bishop Juventino Kestering (1997.11.19 – 2021.03.28)
  - Bishop Osório Willibaldo Stoffel, O.F.M. (1986.02.15 – 1997.11.19)
- Prelates of Rondonópolis (Roman Rite)
  - Bishop Osório Willibaldo Stoffel, O.F.M. (1970.11.27 – 1986.02.15)
  - Bishop Vunibaldo Godchard Talleur, O.F.M. (1961.11.25 – 1970)
- Prelates of Chapada (Roman Rite)
  - Bishop Vunibaldo Godchard Talleur, O.F.M. (1947.12.20 – 1961.11.25)

=== Other priest of this diocese who became bishop ===
- Giovane Pereira de Melo, appointed Bishop of Tocantinópolis, Tocantins in 2009
