= Diocese of Sinop =

Catholic ecclesiastical territory

Diocese of Sinop Dioecesis Sinopensis
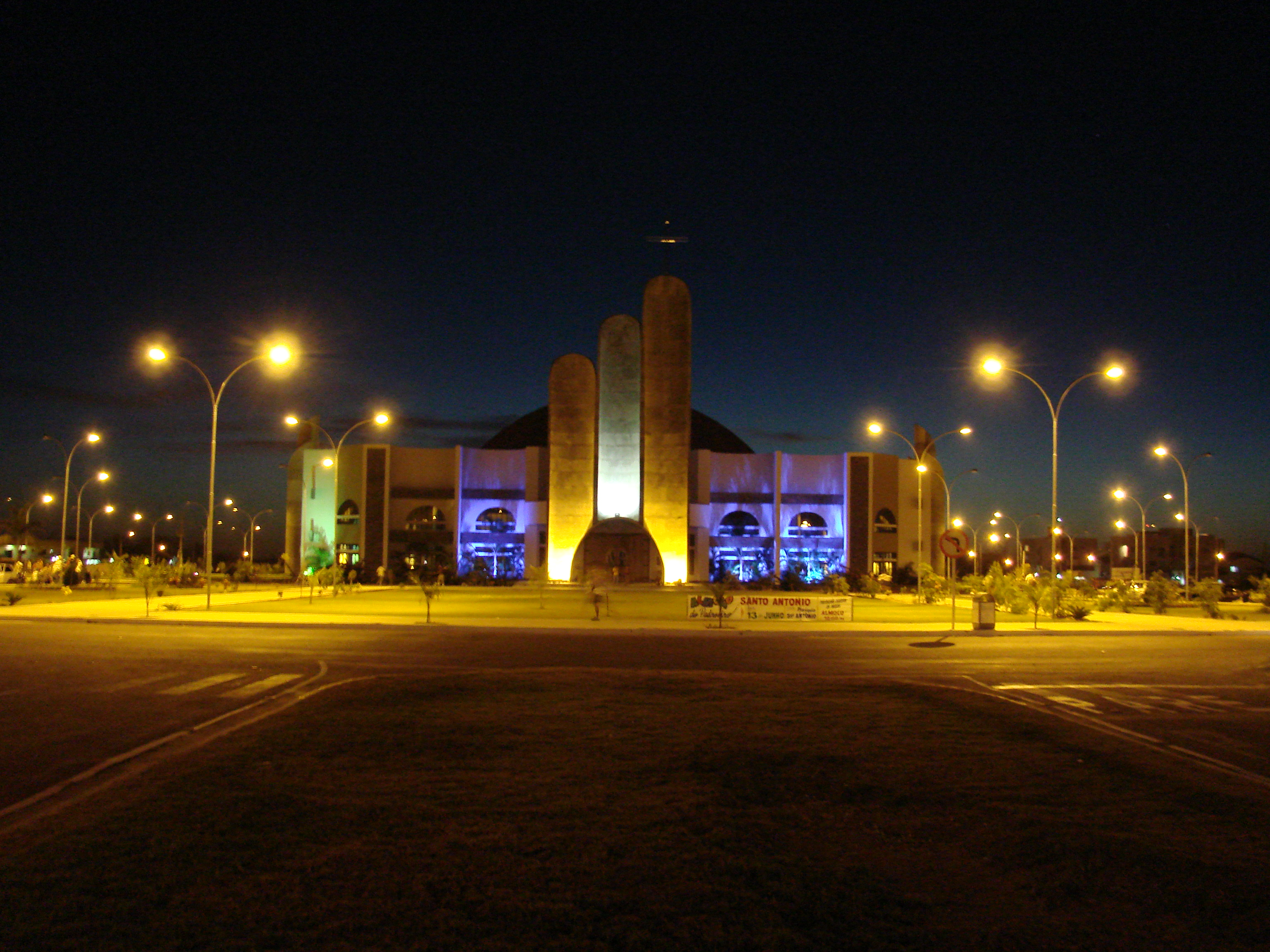
- Cathedral of St. Anthony

Location
- Country: Brazil
- Ecclesiastical province: Cuiabá

Statistics
- Area: 191,000 km^{2} (74,000 sq mi)
- Population: Total; Catholics: (as of 2014); 650,000; 534,000 (82.2%)

Information
- Rite: Latin Rite
- Established: 6 February 1982 (44 years ago)
- Cathedral: Catedral Santo Antônio

Current leadership
- Pope: Leo XIV
- Bishop: Canisio Klaus
- Metropolitan Archbishop: Mário Antônio da Silva

The Roman Catholic Diocese of Sinop (Latin: Dioecesis Sinopensis) is a diocese located in the city of Sinop in the ecclesiastical province of Cuiabá in Brazil.

== History ==
- February 6, 1982: Established as Diocese of Sinop from the Diocese of Diamantino

== Bishops ==
- Bishops of Sinop (Roman rite), in reverse chronological order
  - Bishop Canisio Klaus (2016.01.20 - Present)
  - Bishop Gentil Delázari (1995.03.22 – 2016.01.20)
  - Bishop Henrique Froehlich, S.J. (1982.03.25 – 1995.03.22)

=== Coadjutor bishop ===
- Gentil Delázari (1994-1995)
