= Diocese of Diamantino =

Catholic ecclesiastical territory

Coordinates: 14.4035°S 56.4238°W

Diocese of Diamantino Dioecesis Adamanteae Diocese de Diamantino
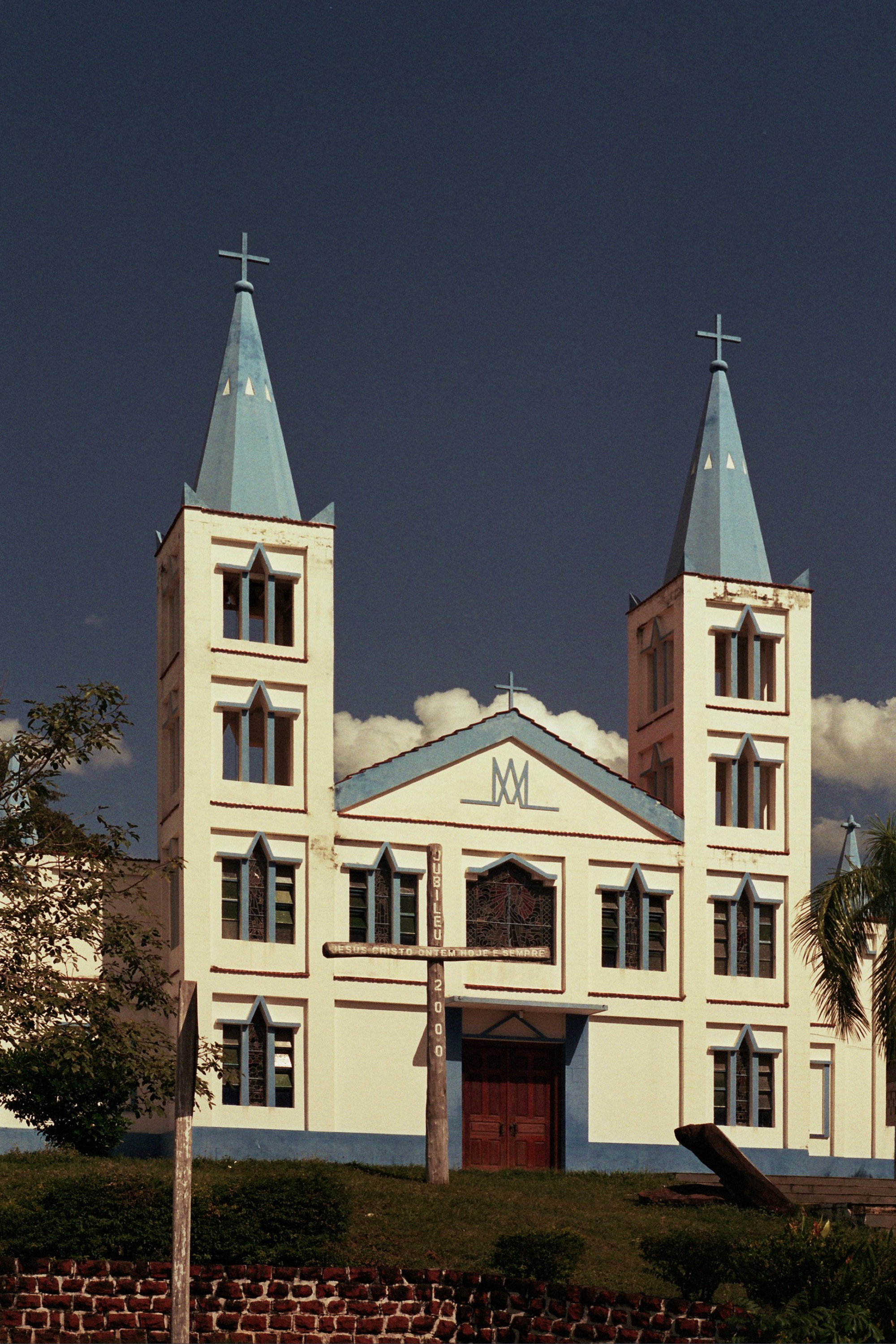
- Cathedral of the Immaculate Conception in Diamantino in 2010

Location
- Country: Brazil
- Ecclesiastical province: Cuiabá
- Metropolitan: Cuiabá

Statistics
- Area: 105,406 km^{2} (40,697 sq mi)
- Population: Total; Catholics: (as of 2006); 269,192; 188,434 (70%)

Information
- Rite: Latin Rite
- Established: 22 March 1929 (96 years ago)
- Cathedral: Cathedral of the Immaculate Conception in Diamantino

Current leadership
- Pope: Leo XIV
- Bishop: Vital Chitolina, SCI
- Metropolitan Archbishop: Mário Antônio da Silva

Website
- Website of the Diocese

The Roman Catholic Diocese of Diamantino (Latin: Dioecesis Adamanteae) is a diocese located in the city of Diamantino in the ecclesiastical province of Cuiabá in Brazil.

== History ==
- 22 March 1929: Established as Territorial Prelature of Diamantino from the Metropolitan Archdiocese of Cuiabá
- 16 October 1979: Promoted as Diocese of Diamantino
- 6 February 1982: Lost territory to establish Diocese of Sinop
- 23 December 1997: Lost territory, along with Diocese of Ji-Paraná, to establish Diocese of Juína

== Bishops ==
=== Ordinaries, in reverse chronological order ===
- Bishops of Diamantino (Latin Rite)
  - Vital Chitolina, S.C.I. (2011.12.28 - present)
  - Canísio Klaus (1998.08.26 – 2011.12.28), appointed Bishop of Santa Cruz do Sul, Rio Grande do Sul
  - Agostinho Willy Kist, S.J. (1982.11.15 – 1998.08.26)
  - Henrique Froehlich, S.J. (1979.10.16 – 1982.03.25), appointed Bishop of Sinop, Mato Grosso
- Prelates of Diamantino (Roman Rite)
  - Henrique Froehlich, S.J. (1971.11.29 – 1979.10.16)
  - Alonso Silveira de Mello, S.J. (1955.06.13 – 1971.11.29; Apostolic Administrator 1949.11.12 – 1955.06.13)

=== Coadjutor bishop ===
- Canísio Klaus (1998)
