= Pascoal Moreira Cabral Leme =

Brazilian bandeirante

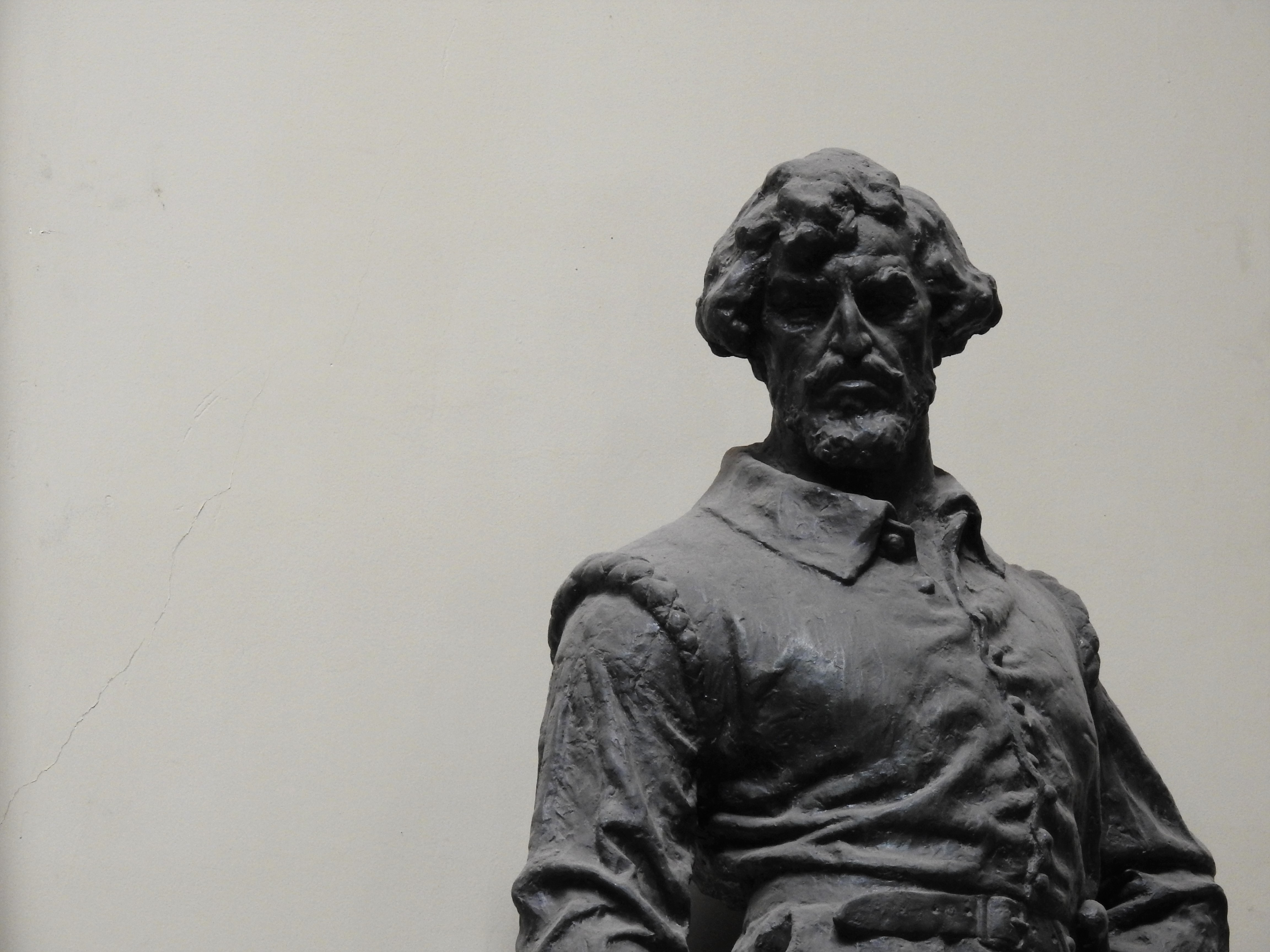
- Statue in the Museu do Ipiranga
- Born: c. 1654; Sorocaba, Colony of Brazil
- Died: 1730 (aged 75–76); Cuiabá
- Occupation: Bandeirante

Pascoal Moreira Cabral Leme (c. 1654–1730) was a bandeirante who operated in the central region of South America. He found gold at the site which became the city of Cuiabá.

== Gold ==
In 1719, he was camped near the settlement of São Gonçalo, when he found gold at the shore of the Coxipó-Mirim creek in the modern State of Mato Grosso. That day, April 8, is considered to be the day that Cuiabá was founded. The city's foundation, as Leme states himself, was to ensure the appropriation of the land and gold fields for the Portuguese Crown, although that land was technically the property of the Spanish Crown according to the Treaty of Tordesillas.

== See also ==
- Genealogia Paulistana, by Luiz Gonzaga da Silva Leme. São Paulo, Duprat & Co., 1903-05 (9 volumes). Vol. VII, pg. 433 on.
