= Archdiocese of Cuiabá =

Catholic ecclesiastical territory

Coordinates: 15.5976°S 56.0961°W

Metropolitan Archdiocese of Cuiabá Archidioecesis Metropolitae Cuiabensis Arquidiocese Metropolitana de Cuiabá
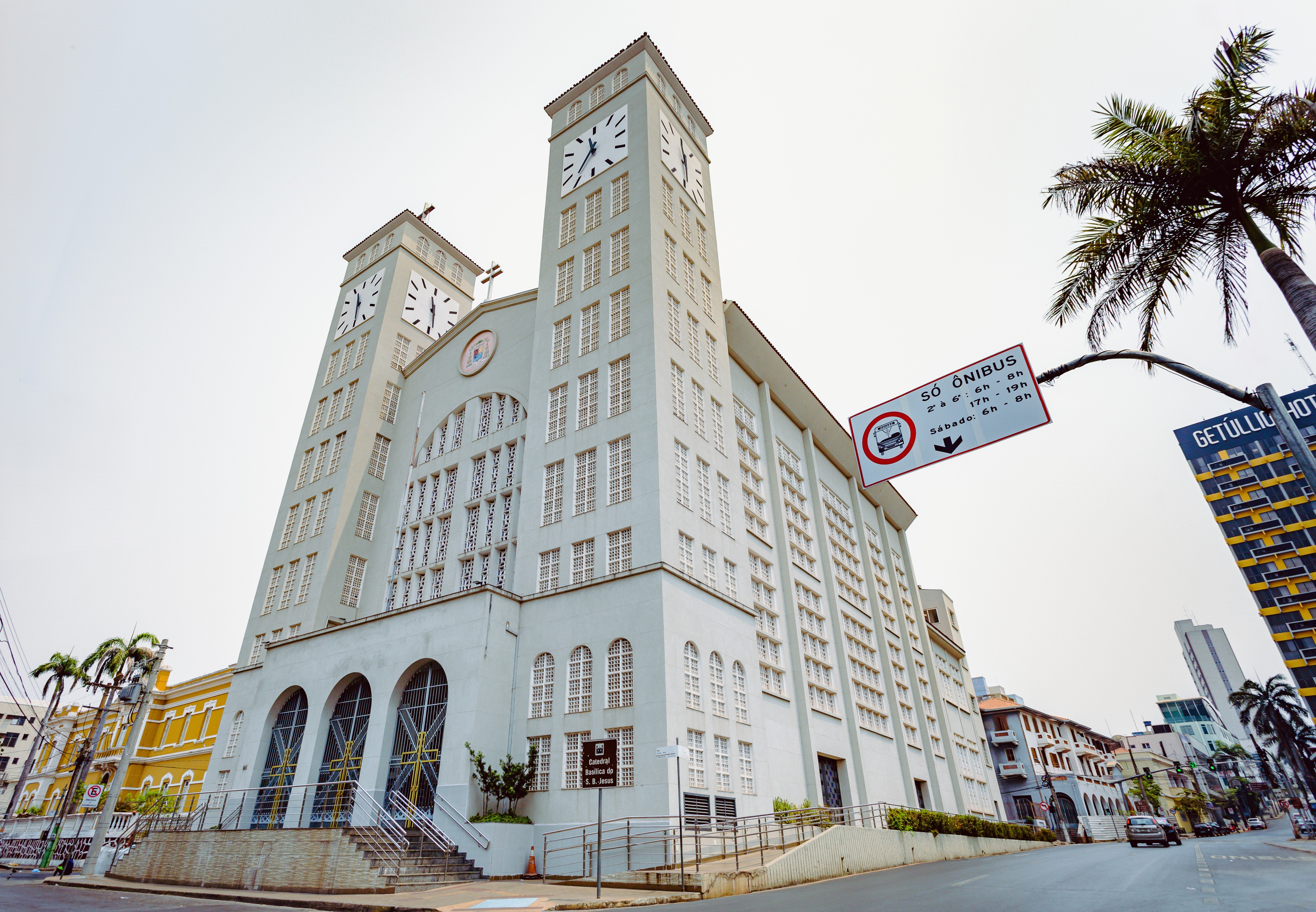
- The Metropolitan Cathedral

- Coat of arms

Location
- Country: Brazil
- Ecclesiastical province: Cuiabá

Statistics
- Area: 24,542 km^{2} (9,476 sq mi)
- Population: Total; Catholics: (as of 2006); 851,961; 724,166 (85.0%)

Information
- Rite: Latin Rite
- Established: 6 December 1745 (280 years ago)
- Cathedral: Cathedral Basilica of the Good Lord Jesus in Cuiabá

Current leadership
- Pope: Leo XIV
- Metropolitan Archbishop: Dom. Wellington de Queiroz Vieira
- Bishops emeritus: Mílton Antônio dos Santos, S.D.B. Bonifácio Piccinini, S.D.B.

Website
- www.arquidiocesecuiaba.org.br

The Roman Catholic Metropolitan Archdiocese of Cuiabá (Latin: Archidioecesis Metropolitae Cuiabensis) is an archdiocese located in the city of Cuiabá in Brazil.

== History ==
- December 6, 1745: Established as Territorial Prelature of Cuiabá from the Diocese of São Sebastião do Rio de Janeiro
- July 15, 1826: Promoted as Diocese of Cuiabá
- March 10, 1910: Promoted as Metropolitan Archdiocese of Cuiabá

== Bishops ==
=== Ordinaries, in reverse chronological order ===
- Archbishops of Cuiabá (Roman rite)
  - Archbishop Wellington de Queiroz Vieira
  - Archbishop Mário Antônio da Silva (2022.02.23 – 2026.03.02)
  - Archbishop Mílton Antônio dos Santos, S.D.B. (2004.06.09 – 2022.02.23)
  - Archbishop Bonifácio Piccinini, S.D.B. (1981.08.15 – 2004.06.09)
  - Archbishop Orlando Chaves, S.D.B. (1956.12.18 – 1981.08.15)
  - Archbishop Francisco de Aquino Correia, S.D.B. (1921.08.26 – 1956.03.22)
  - Archbishop Carlos Luiz d'Amour (1910.03.10 – 1921.07.09)
- Bishops of Cuiabá (Roman Rite)
  - Bishop Carlos Luiz d'Amour (later Archbishop) (1877.09.21 – 1910.03.10)
  - Bishop José Antônio dos Reis (1832.07.02 – 1876.10.11)
  - Bishop José Maria Macerata (1826.07.15 – 1831)
- Prelates of Cuiabá (Roman Rite)
  - Bishop José Maria Macerata (1823 – 1826.07.15)
  - Bishop Luiz de Castro Pereira, C.S.J. (1804.10.29 – 1822.08.01)
  - Bishop José Nicolau de Azevedo Coutinho Gentil (1782.01.23 – 1788.03.07), appointed Prelate of Goiás

=== Coadjutor bishops ===
- Cyrillo de Paula Freitas (1905-1911), did not succeed to see; appointed Bishop of Corumbá, Mato Grosso do Sul
- Bonifácio Piccinini, S.D.B. (1975-1981)
- Mílton Antônio dos Santos, S.D.B. (2003-2004)

=== Auxiliary bishops ===
- Francisco de Aquino Correa, S.D.B. (1914-1921), appointed Archbishop here
- Antônio Campelo de Aragão, S.D.B. (1950-1956), appointed Bishop of Petrolina, Pernambuco

== Suffragan dioceses ==
- Diocese of Barra do Garças
- Diocese of Diamantino
- Diocese of Juína
- Diocese of Primavera do Leste–Paranatinga
- Diocese of Rondonópolis-Guiratinga
- Diocese of São Luíz de Cáceres
- Diocese of Sinop
- Territorial Prelature of São Félix

== Sources ==
- GCatholic.org
- Catholic Hierarchy
- Archdiocese website

== Historic properties ==
The Roman Catholic Archdiocese of Cuiabá has many historic structures, some listed under federal, state, or municipal protection.

- Church of Our Lady of the Rosary and Saint Benedict, built 1730, listed by the National Institute of Historic and Artistic Heritage (IPHAN) in 1975
- Church of Our Lady of the Good Death, built ca. 1810, listed by Mato Grosso in 1993
- Church of Saint Gonçalo
- Church of Our Lord of the Steps
- Church of Our Lady of Good Delivery
