= Luiz Alves =

Coordinates: 26°44′S 48°57′W

- Municipality
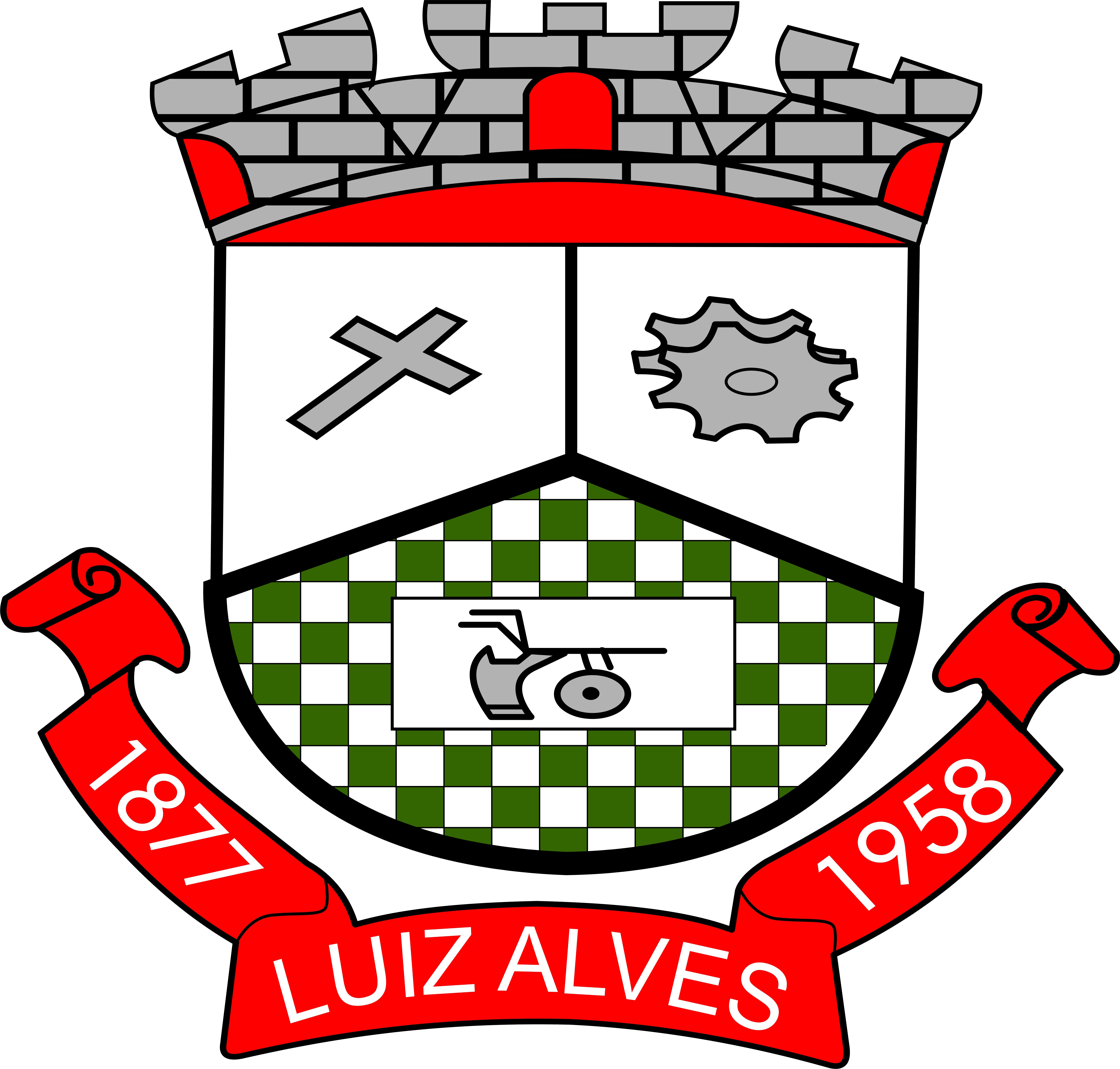
- Flag Coat of arms

- Country: Brazil
- Region: South
- State: Santa Catarina
- Mesoregion: Vale do Itajai

Population (2020)
  - Total: 13,107
- Time zone: UTC -3
- Website: www.luizalves.sc.gov.br

Luiz Alves is a municipality in the state of Santa Catarina in the South region of Brazil.

== See also ==
- List of municipalities in Santa Catarina
