= São Ludgero =

Coordinates: 28.3258°S 49.1767°W

- Municipality
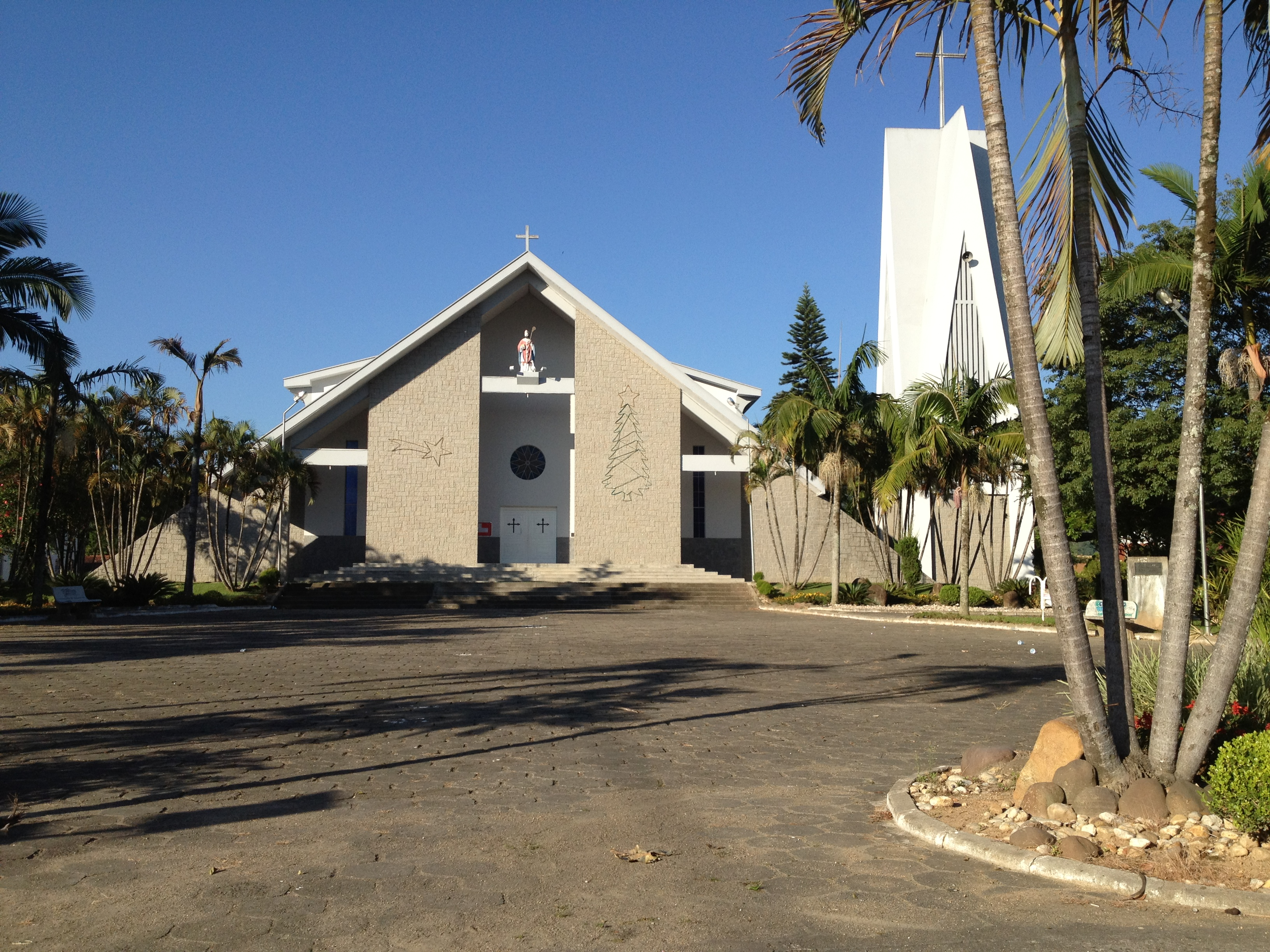

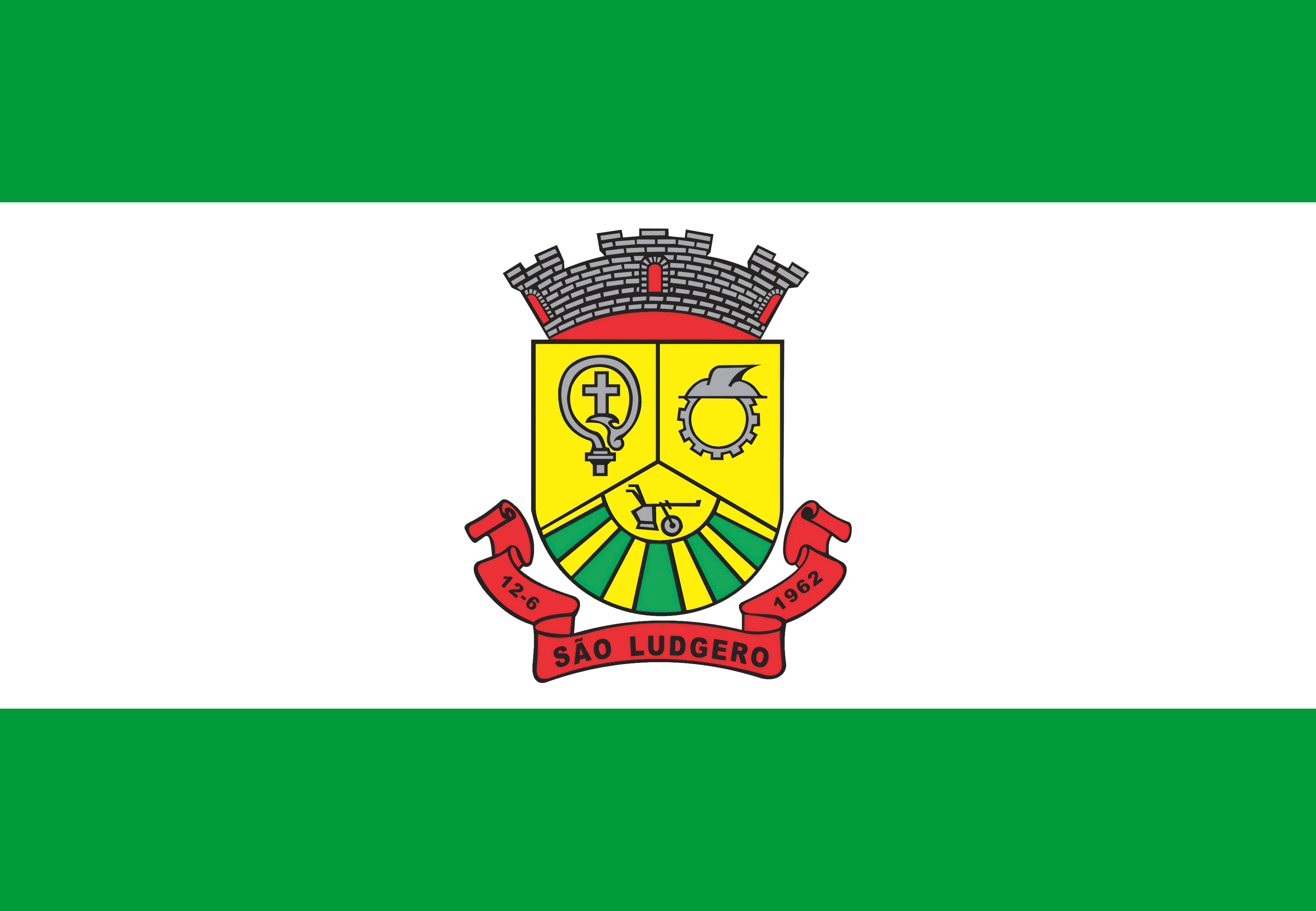
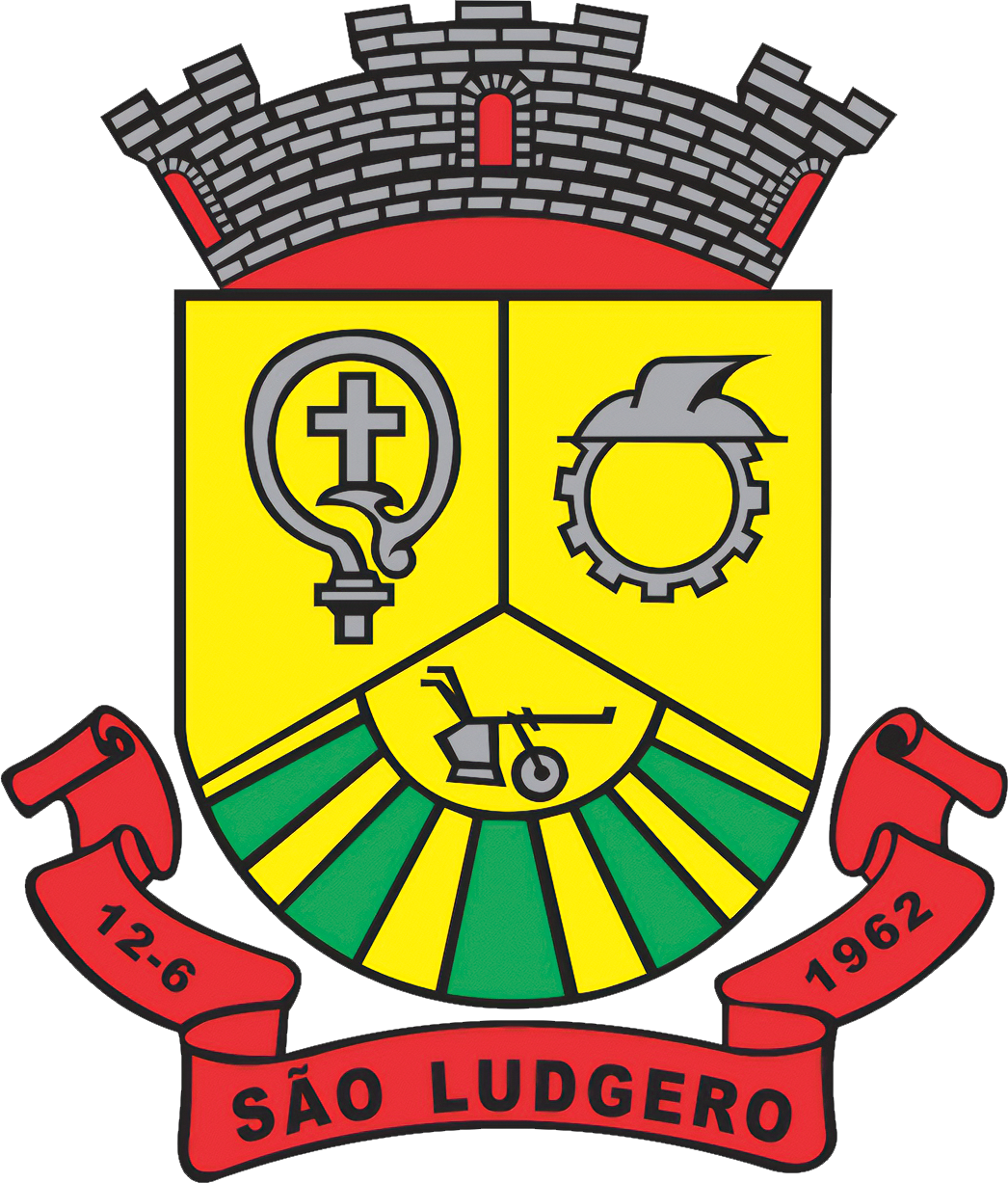
- Flag Coat of arms
- Interactive map of São Ludgero
- Country: Brazil
- Region: South
- State: Santa Catarina
- Mesoregion: Sul Catarinense

Population (2020)
  - Total: 13,650
- Time zone: UTC -3
- Website: www.saoludgero.sc.gov.br

São Ludgero is a municipality in the state of Santa Catarina in the South region of Brazil.this is a relatively small town with around 15,000 people in 2026.

== See also ==
- List of municipalities in Santa Catarina

== History ==
It was founded in the 1860s-1870s by German immigrants [many from Munster and Heek, Germany. It officially broke away from braco de Norte on June 12, 1962 gaining political emancipation along the way.

== Climate ==
In February Summers are warm with highs around 85F°. While winters in July are pretty medium with lows of 48°F. But when the summer has more humidity it pushes temps to around 95°F. There are around 120 rainy days overpowering the amount of sunny days which is 100. Along with rainy days there are about 60 thunder storm days
