= Latin American liberation theology =

Synthesis of Christian theology and Marxism

Latin American liberation theology (Spanish: Teología de la liberación, Portuguese: Teologia da libertação) is a synthesis of Christian theology and Marxian socio-economic analyses, that emphasizes "social concern for the poor and political liberation for oppressed peoples". Beginning in the 1960s after the Second Vatican Council and influenced by Camilism, which can be considered the predecessor of it, liberation theology became the political praxis of Latin American theologians such as Gustavo Gutiérrez, Leonardo Boff, and Jesuits Juan Luis Segundo and Jon Sobrino, who popularized the phrase "preferential option for the poor". It arose principally as a moral reaction to the poverty and social injustice in the region, which Cepal deemed the most unequal in the world.

This expression was used first by Jesuit Fr. General Pedro Arrupe in 1968 and soon after this the World Synod of Catholic Bishops in 1971 chose as its theme "Justice in the World". It was popularized in 1971 by the Peruvian priest Gustavo Gutiérrez, who wrote one of the movement's defining books, A Theology of Liberation. Other noted exponents include Leonardo Boff of Brazil, and Jesuits Jon Sobrino of El Salvador and Juan Luis Segundo of Uruguay.

The Latin American context also produced Protestant advocates of liberation theology, such as Rubem Alves, José Míguez Bonino, and C. René Padilla, who in the 1970s called for integral mission, emphasizing evangelism and social responsibility.

== History ==
A major player in the formation of liberation theology was the Latin American Episcopal Conference (CELAM). Created in 1955 in Rio de Janeiro, Brazil, CELAM pushed the Second Vatican Council (1962–1965) toward a more socially oriented stance.

After the Second Vatican Council, CELAM held two conferences which were important in determining the future of liberation theology: the first was held in Medellín, Colombia, in 1968, and the second in Puebla, Mexico, in January 1979. The Medellín conference debated how to apply the teachings of Vatican II to Latin America, and its conclusions were strongly influenced by liberation theology, which grew out of these officially recognized ideas. While the Medellín document is not a liberation theology document, it laid the groundwork for much of it, and after it was published, liberation theology developed rapidly in the Latin American Catholic Church.

Peruvian priest Gustavo Gutiérrez has been widely regarded as the "father of liberation theology", with his 1971 book A Theology of Liberation considered to have been instrumental in the movement's formation.

Cardinal Alfonso López Trujillo was a central figure after the Medellín Conference. As a priest in Bogotá in 1968, he did not attend the conference. But he was elected in 1972 as general secretary of CELAM, and then its president in 1979 (at the Puebla conference). He represented a more conservative position, becoming a favourite of Pope John Paul II and the "principal scourge of liberation theology". López's faction became predominant in CELAM after the 1972 Sucre conference, and in the Roman Curia after the 1979 CELAM conference in Puebla.

Despite the conservative bishops' predominance in CELAM, liberation theology remained popular in South America. Thus at the 1979 Puebla Conference the conservative bishops were met by strong opposition from those in the clergy who supported the concept of a "preferential option for the poor" and basic ecclesial communities, approved at the Medellín conference.

Pope John Paul II gave the opening speech at the Puebla Conference in 1979. The general tone of his remarks was conciliatory. He criticized radical liberation theology, saying, "this idea of Christ as a political figure, a revolutionary, as the subversive of Nazareth, does not tally with the Church's catechesis"; however, he did acknowledge that "the growing wealth of a few parallels the growing poverty of the masses", and he affirmed both the principle of private property and that the Church "must preach, educate individuals and collectivities, form public opinion, and offer orientations to the leaders of the peoples" towards the goal of a "more just and equitable distribution of goods".

Some liberation theologians, however, including Gustavo Gutiérrez, had been barred from attending the Puebla Conference. Working from a seminary and with aid from sympathetic, liberal bishops, they partially obstructed other clergy's efforts to ensure that the Puebla Conference documents satisfied conservative concerns. Within four hours of the Pope's speech, Gutiérrez and the other priests wrote a 20-page response, which was circulated at the conference, and has been claimed to have influenced its outcome. According to a socio-political study of liberation theology in Latin America, a quarter of the final Puebla documents were written by theologians who were not invited to the conference.

== Theology ==
Liberation theology could be interpreted as an attempt to return to the gospel of the early church where Christianity is politically and culturally decentralized.

Liberation theology proposes to fight poverty by addressing its alleged source, the sin of greed. In so doing, it explores the relationship between Christian theology (especially Roman Catholic) and political activism, especially in relation to economic justice, poverty, and human rights. The principal methodological innovation is seeing theology from the perspective of the poor and the oppressed. For example, Jon Sobrino argues that the poor are a privileged channel of God's grace.

Some liberation theologians base their social action upon the Biblical description of the mission of Jesus Christ as bringing a sword (social unrest), e.g., Isaiah 61:1, Matthew 10:34, Luke 22:35–38 – and not as bringing peace (social order). This Biblical interpretation is a call to action against poverty, and the sin engendering it, to effect Jesus Christ's mission of justice in this world.

Gustavo Gutiérrez gave the movement its name with his 1971 book, A Theology of Liberation. In this book, Gutiérrez combined populist ideas with the social teachings of the Catholic Church. He was influenced by an existing socialist current in the Church which included organizations such as the Catholic Worker Movement and the Jeunesse Ouvrière Chrétienne, a Belgian Christian youth worker organization. He was also influenced by Paul Gauthier's Christ, the church and the poor (1965). Gutiérrez's book is based on an understanding of history in which the human being is seen as assuming conscious responsibility for human destiny, and yet Christ the Saviour liberates the human race from sin, which is the root of all disruption of friendship and of all injustice and oppression. Gutiérrez also popularized the phrase "preferential option for the poor", which became a slogan of liberation theology and later appeared in addresses of the Pope. Drawing from the biblical motif on the poor, Gutiérrez asserts that God is revealed as having a preference for those people who are "insignificant", "marginalized", "unimportant", "needy", "despised", and "defenseless". Moreover, he makes clear that terminology of "the poor" in the Christian Bible has social and economic connotations that etymologically go back to the Greek word ptōchos. To be sure, as to not misinterpret Gutiérrez's definition of the term "preferential option", he stresses, "Preference implies the universality of God's love, which excludes no one. It is only within the framework of this universality that we can understand the preference, that is, 'what comes first'."

Gutiérrez emphasized practice (or, more technically, "praxis") over doctrine. He clarified his position by advocating a circular relationship between orthodoxy and orthopraxis, in a symbiotic relationship. His reading of prophets condemning oppression and injustice against the poor (i.e., Jeremiah 22:13–17) informs his assertion that to know God (orthodoxy) is to do justice (orthopraxis). Cardinal Joseph Ratzinger (later Pope Benedict XVI), however, criticized liberation theology for elevating orthopraxis to the level of orthodoxy. Richard McBrien summarizes this concept as follows:

God is disclosed in the historical "praxis" of liberation. It is the situation, and our passionate and reflective involvement in it, which mediates the Word of God. Today that Word is mediated through the cries of the poor and the oppressed.

Another important hallmark for Gutiérrez's brand of liberation theology is an interpretation of revelation as "history". For example, Gutiérrez wrote:

History is the scene of the revelation God makes of the mystery of his person. God's word reaches us in the measure of our involvement in the evolution of history.

Gutiérrez also considered the Church to be the "sacrament of history", an outward and visible sign of an inward and spiritual grace, thus pointing to the doctrine of universal salvation as the true means to eternal life, and assigning the Church itself to a somewhat temporal role, namely, liberation.

== Practice ==
One of the most radical and influential aspects of liberation theology was the social organization, or reorganization, of church practice through the model of Christian base communities, also called basic ecclesial communities. Liberation theology strove to be a bottom-up movement in practice, with Biblical interpretation and liturgical practice designed by lay practitioners themselves, rather than by the Church hierarchy. In this context, sacred text interpretation is understood as "praxis".

The priest Camilo Torres (a leader of the Colombian guerrilla group ELN) celebrated the Eucharist only among those engaged in armed struggle against the army of the Colombian state. He also fought for the ELN.

Liberation theology seeks to interpret the actions of the Catholic Church and the teachings of Jesus Christ from the perspective of the poor and disadvantaged. In Latin America, liberation theologians specifically target the severe disparities between rich and poor in the existing social and economic orders within the state's political and corporate structures. It is a strong critique of the economic and social structures, such as an oppressive government supported by a conservative Church hierarchy and by First World economic interests, that allow some to be extremely rich while others are unable even to have safe drinking water.

Contemporaneously, Fanmi Lavalas in Haiti, the Landless Workers' Movement in Brazil, and Abahlali baseMjondolo in South Africa are three organizations that make use of liberation theology.

=== Base ecclesial communities ===
The journalist and writer Penny Lernoux described this aspect of liberation theology in her numerous and committed writings intended to explain the movement's ideas in North America. Base communities were small gatherings, usually outside of churches, in which the Bible could be discussed, and Mass could be said. They were especially active in rural parts of Latin America where parish priests were not always available, as they placed a high value on lay participation.

After decades of repression from the government authorities, the liberationist Catholic Church in Brazil is absent of traditional centralization and encourages an increased lay participation. Faced with a severe priest shortage, much of the Brazilian Catholic Church is organized into basic ecclesial communities (CEB) in which the Mass, community spirituality programs, and community needs are led or addressed by a single clergy member or a trained lay member in either a small chapel or an individual's home. The CEBs introduced new social ideas and democratic methods which led to many participants' active involvement in popular movements of Brazil that worked for progressive social change. An example of progressive social change initiated by the CEBs is in Nova Iguaçu. A health program began there to try to organize the population in order to remedy widespread malnutrition, open sewers, and other health hazards. Eventually the neighbourhood initiative reached a national interest level where it then became a mass movement in nearly every neighbourhood. Initiatives like the health program in Nova Iguaçu illustrate how CEBs have helped the transition from military to democratic rule.

While liberation theology has brought about significant progressive reforms in Brazil, anthropologist Robin Nagle questions the effectiveness of Catholic Church theology in Brazil. Nagle concentrates on the conflict between conservatives and liberationists in Recife, Brazil, in 1990. The poor neighbourhood of Morro da Conceição had a liberationist priest named Reginaldo who was expelled by the traditionalist archbishop because the archbishop found Reginaldo's politics and social theology annoying and adverse to his own agenda. When Reginaldo and his followers refused to accept the expulsion and the new priest, the archbishop called in the Military Police. Conversely, the event did not cause a mass response because the liberationist agenda aroused distrust and even hatred among many of its intended audience. The main reason was that it was too much to ask poor parishioners to embrace a Church focused more on the troubles of this life than solace in the next. But this was not the viewpoint of Archbishop Dom Helder Camara, archbishop of Recife from 1964 to 1985 (d. 1999), who supported liberation theology and worked for the poor, and whose cause is advancing for canonization.

While Robin Nagle claims that liberation theology is ineffective for genuine social change, anthropologist Manuel Vásquez argues that liberation theology embraced by CEBs creates a twofold effect, because it not only provides moral justification for resistance but it also serves as a means to organize the resistance. Many people come to the CEB through conversion experiences, but also because they are keenly concerned with the spiritual and infrastructural needs of their community. Through his fieldwork in working-class neighbourhoods of Rio de Janeiro, Vásquez reveals that CEBs combat disenfranchisement but also serve to overcome the obstacles associated with materialism and globalization. The social and political impact can be viewed in terms of initial consciousness-raising, the motivation for involvement, the sense of community they develop, the experience of grassroots democracy, the direct actions they engage in, and finally, directly political actions.

In May 2007, it was estimated that 80,000 base communities existed in Brazil, with others existing around the world.

=== Latin American integral mission ===
Integral mission or holistic mission is a term coined in Spanish as misión integral in the 1970s by members of the evangelical group Latin American Theological Fellowship (or FTL, its Spanish acronym) to describe an understanding of Christian mission which embraces both the evangelism and social responsibility. Since Lausanne 1974, integral mission has influenced a significant number of evangelicals around the world.

The word integral is used in Spanish to describe wholeness (as in wholemeal bread or whole wheat). Theologians use it to describe an understanding of Christian mission that affirms the importance of expressing the love of God and neighbourly love through every means possible. Proponents such as C. René Padilla of Ecuador, Samuel Escobar of Peru, and Orlando E. Costas of Puerto Rico have wanted to emphasize the breadth of the Good News and of the Christian mission, and used the word integral to signal their discomfort with conceptions of Christian mission based on a dichotomy between evangelism and social involvement.

The proponents of integral mission argue that the concept of integral mission is nothing new – rather, it is rooted in Scripture and wonderfully exemplified in Jesus' own ministry. "Integral mission" is only a distinct vocabulary for a holistic understanding of mission that has been emphasized in the past forty years in order to distinguish it from widely held but dualistic approaches that emphasize either evangelism or social responsibility.

=== Sandinista Nicaragua ===
Liberation theology and its practitioners played an essential role in the formation and leadership of the Sandinista National Liberation Front (Spanish: Frente Sandinista de Liberación Nacional, FSLN). This relationship, which reached its apex in the earliest years of FSLN rule (1978–1990) following the Nicaraguan Revolution, is observed in the ideological convergence between liberation theology and Sandinismo, the influence of liberation theologians within the FSLN government, and the interrelated support for liberation theology and the FSLN among the Nicaraguan populace, ranging from urban citizens to ecclesial base communities.

==== The formation of Sandinismo ====
Liberation theology played an important role in the development of Sandinismo the philosophical foundation of the FSLN. In the 1970s, practitioners of liberation theology increasingly viewed the FSLN as the optimal revolutionary alternative to the regime of Anastasio Somoza, whose regime was marked by human rights abuses. This alliance brought about the advent of Sandinismo, which combined the radical agrarian nationalism of Augusto Sandino with revolutionary Christianity and Latin American Marxism.

The FSLN appealed to liberation theologians for several reasons. As discussed by Nicaraguan liberation theologians like Ernesto Cardenal and Miguel D'Escoto, liberation theology and its efforts to bring about social justice and an end to the oppression of poor inherently connected with the anti-capitalist and Marxist ideological platform of the FSLN. Like the Marxist foundations of the FSLN, liberation theologians viewed history through an eschatological lens, meaning that historical evolution was oriented towards a final destiny. Although the FSLN did not embrace the Christian eschatological vision of liberation theologians, both liberation theology and Sandinismo emphasized the need for revolutionary action that empowered the poor as historical agents in bringing about a new society. This emphasis, evident in accounts from Nicaraguan citizens who claimed that the Sandinista revolution made them feel like "architects of their liberation", attracted masses of Nicaraguan Catholics to join the FSLN.

==== Liberation theology and Sandinista government ====
Following the successful ousting of Somoza and the establishment of the FSLN government in 1979, liberation theology and its practitioners shaped initiatives pursued by the FSLN. In following Christian theological principles of forgiveness and peace, as articulated by Tomas Borge, the FSLN became the first modern revolutionary movement to ban the death penalty and not perform executions of political enemies after rising to power. Liberation theology also played a key role in the 1980 Nicaraguan Literacy Campaign (Spanish: Cruzada nacional de alfabetización) with thousands of Catholic youth and priests leading efforts to end illiteracy among the Nicaraguan poor. As discussed by scholar Sandra Langley, this campaign embraced overly religious metaphors and imagery, notably its characterization as a "crusade". Beyond this campaign, priests and nuns of religious orders like the Maryknoll sisters facilitated FSLN public health campaigns.

In addition to the hundreds of priests, nuns, and laypeople who participated in FSLN programs, several liberation theologians held executive positions within the FSLN government. In 1979, Ernesto Cardenal and Miguel D'Escoto became the FSLN Minister of Culture and Foreign Minister, respectively. Other priests including Fernando Cardenal, Edgar Parrales, and Alvaro Arguello also served in governmental positions with the FSLN. Despite criticism and threats from the conservative Nicaraguan Catholic hierarchy and the Vatican, these liberation theologians held office throughout the rule of the FSLN, maintaining their conception that their governmental service expressed a theological commitment to social justice and the liberation of the poor.

==== Liberation theology within the Nicaraguan populace ====
Beyond the relationship between the FSLN and notable liberation theologians, liberation theology mobilized Nicaraguan Christians in support of the FSLN before, during, and after the Nicaraguan Revolution. Liberation theology initially spread across Nicaragua in the late 1960s and early 1970s from secular priests and lay Christians who adopted this theology after reading the works of liberation theologians like Gustavo Gutiérrez and encountering the living conditions of the poor. Throughout the 1970s, the FSLN attracted increasing numbers of radical Christians to its cause through its emphases on revolutionary social action, armed struggle, and the extension of historical agency to the poor. These messages distinctly appealed to the Nicaraguan Christian masses who, after suffering under periods of martial law and economic exploitation under the Somoza regime, sought to bring about their own liberation through political and religious revolution.

Support for the FSLN among Nicaraguans largely spread through ecclesial base communities, who were introduced to liberation theology and the FSLN through articles written in La Prensa, radio programs, and lessons taught by educated Catholic laypeople. Ecclesial base communities first emerged in Nicaragua in the early 1960s as small, local gatherings of Christians who discussed religious, political, and social matters together. As these communities embraced liberation theology, they rejected the institutional Catholic Church and established connective networks with other base communities. Following two years of FSLN rule, outright opposition to the FSLN from the Catholic hierarchy under Archbishop Miguel Obando y Bravo cemented the divisions between the institutional Catholic church and ecclesial base communities, which embraced the FSLN and liberation theology throughout the 1980s.

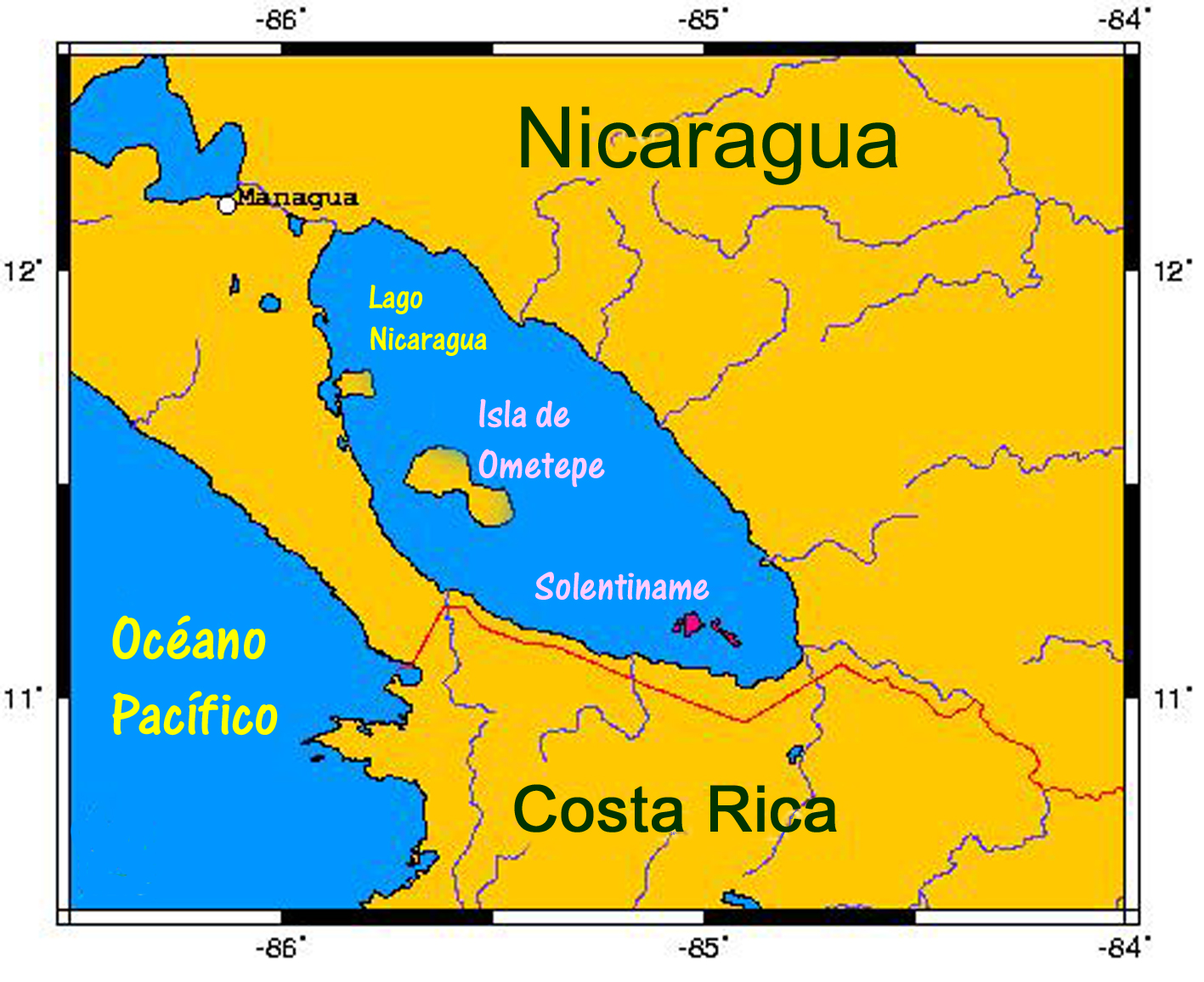
The Solentiname Islands, site of the Solentiname ecclesial base community

One ecclesial base community important in the spread of liberation theology and support for the FSLN was the Solentiname community, established in 1966 by Fr. Ernesto Cardenal. At Solentiname, theologians, priests, and other revolutionaries gathered to pray, write, and reflect on contemporary political and religious matters. This community bridged liberation theology and support for the FSLN in The Gospel of Solentiname, a four-volume exegetical text that re-interpreted the canonical gospels to address the realities of life among the Nicaraguan poor. This document blended themes of liberation and revolutionary Christianity to propose a mutual relationship between Christianity and the FSLN and to justify the pursuit of Marxist revolution as an expression of faith.

The Solentiname community served as a model for countless rural ecclesial base communities across Nicaragua. One such ecclesial base community was located in Gualiqueme, a rural agricultural collective established in 1984 near the Honduras-Nicaragua border. In Gualiqueme, rural villagers engaged in the praxis of liberation theology through weekly gatherings that incorporated scriptural reflection, re-examination of cultural values, and communal work to improve the material outcomes of their community. This community, which additionally served as a defense outpost for the FSLN against the Contras, embodied the interconnected nature of liberation theology with FSLN ideology and policy.

=== Indigenous Brazil ===
The Brazilian Catholic Church, in the world's largest Catholic country, is arguably one of the most theologically progressive Catholic congregations large part to because of a history of violent military and political conflicts, as well as a divisive socioeconomic climate. During Brazil's military rule from 1964 to 1985, the Catholic Church and its members assumed responsibility for providing services to the poor and disenfranchised, often under the threat of persecution. The Vatican II and Medellín conference innovations in liberation theology entered the Brazilian Church as the Brazilian lower classes experienced sharply deteriorating economic and political conditions. Among these were an increase in landownership concentration, a decline in wages and standards of living, and a rise in the military state's political repression and violence, including mass detainment, torture, and the assassination of political opponents.

==== Tapeba ====
The anthropologist and author Max Maranhão Piorsky Aires analyzes the influence of liberation theology on the transformation of the indigenous Tapeba people of Brazil from poor, uneducated inhabitants neglected by the state to rights-bearing and involved citizens. Specifically he largely attributes the work of the Brazilian Catholic Church to the progression of the Tapeba. The Catholic Church enlisted state authorities, anthropologists, and journalists to help uncover the identity of neglected indigenous peoples of Brazil. Early recognition by missionaries and followers of liberation theology stimulated indigenous identification of the Tapeba population as a possibility for attaining rights, especially land, health, and education. The Church gathered and contributed historical knowledge of indigenous territory and identity of the Tapeba in Caucaia that ultimately succeeded in the tribes obtaining a legally codified identity as well as a rightful place as Brazilian subjects.

==== Gurupá ====
In Gurupá, the Catholic Church employed liberation theology to defend indigenous tribes, farmers, and extractors from land expropriation by federal or corporate forces. New religious ideas, in the form of liberation theology, have fortified and legitimized an evolving political culture of resistance. Meanwhile, the Church-supported Base Ecclesial Communities (CEBs) have promoted stronger social connections among community members that has led to more effective activism in Gurupá. The anthropologist Richard Pace's study of Gurupá revealed that CEBs assured safety in united activism and, combined with liberation theology, encouraged members to challenge landowners' commercial monopolies and fight for better standards of living. Pace references a specific incident in the CEB of Nossa Senhora de Fátima in which a community of 24 families of farmers, timber extractors, and traders resisted an extra-regional timber extraction firm. The community negotiated an agreement with the firm that gained them a higher standard of living that included imported goods, increased food availability, and access to health care. While severe social dislocations such as government-initiated capitalist penetration, land expropriation, and poor wages persist, small-farmer activism is fortified by liberation theology and receives structural support from unions, political parties, and church organizations.

=== Colombia ===
Colombia is generally not known for the presence for liberation theology. However, liberation theology in Colombia focused on the broader radical movements of human rights and issues of racial inequality. While it is less significant today, it has not disappeared.

==== Camilo Torres Restrepo ====
Camilo Torres Restrepo (1929–1966) was a priest, a guerrilla, and a sociologist. Torres was convinced that Marxism and Christianity were the only two movements that could bring political change; he concluded that violence was crucial for the change of the Colombian poor. Even though he is often associated with the liberation theology approach, he cannot be properly considered a theologian of liberation since this Christian theological approach fully developed at the end of the 1960s, shortly after his death. He resigned from his university position and joined the guerillas. He was killed fighting for the National Liberation Army (ELN).

==== Gerardo Valencia Cano ====
Bishop Gerardo Valencia Cano was born on August 26, 1917, in Santo Domingo, Antioquia. He was an Apostolic Prefect of Vaupés (1949–1953), Apostolic Vicar of Buenaventura (1953–1972), participated in the Second Vatican Ecumenical Council (1962–1965), was the first President of the Department of Missions of CELAM (1966), and the director of the Colombian Anthropology Center of the Missions and Ethnia magazine. He organized the First Continental Meeting of the Latin American Missions in Melgar (Tolima) in 1966.

Bishop Valencia Cano devoted his career to missionary work with the Afro-Colombians and the Indigenous in Vaupés and Buenaventura. Over time, Bishop Cano became increasingly involved with social issues and the justice for Afro-Colombians. He argued for the use of the term "moreno" instead of "negro" as a more sincere way of associating people with darker skin color. Addressing the social and radical changes he used a weekly radio broadcast. As he became more involved with social justice, he hosted the second meeting of the Golconda Priest movement. Critics labeled him the "Red Bishop" and called him communist. After his death in a mysterious plane crash on January 21, 1972, he is remembered as the bishop of the blacks for his work with Afro-Colombians. Before his death, he was considered the highest institutional support for liberation theology in the Colombian Catholic Church.

==== The Golconda Statement by Colombian priests ====
In 1968, a group of Colombian priests saw the revolution as the only way to overcome "underdevelopment" and become more modernized. The document was prepared by the second meeting of an association which is known as "The Golconda Priest Group". The priests came up with the name "Golconda" during their first meeting in July 1968 held in Voit, Cundinamarca. The second meeting was held in Buenaventura, hosted by Bishop Valencia Cano. The coordination of the priests was designed for study of Pope Paul VI's encyclical Populorum progressio and for discussion on the conditions of the Second Episcopal Conference. Golconda intended to: "employ a scientific method for analysis and action; condemn the dominant nature of imperialism; confront the power of the traditional parties; end the relationships with the conservative structures of the state; and start a revolution for modernizing Colombia." Reaction to the Golconda statement was strongly negative from both the Church and the Colombian government.

==== The Church and Colombia's civil war ====
During the low-intensity civil war between the guerillas and the Colombian government, progressive Catholics were some of the most powerful advocates for human rights. However, church members were targeted by the Colombian military for their human rights works. One Colombian newspaper calculated, "between 1984 and September of 2011, two bishops, 79 priests, eight men and women religious, and three seminarians have been killed in Colombia alone. And, for the most part, these victims have been advocates for the poor and have been killed by right-wing paramilitaries aligned with the Colombian state and military."

== Reactions ==
=== Ratzinger era ===
In March 1983, Cardinal Joseph Ratzinger (later Pope Benedict XVI), head of the Vatican's Congregation for the Doctrine of the Faith (CDF), made ten observations of Gustavo Gutiérrez's theology, accusing Gutiérrez of politically interpreting the Bible in supporting temporal messianism, and stating that the predominance of orthopraxis over orthodoxy in his thought proved a Marxist influence. Ratzinger objected that the spiritual concept of the Church as "People of God" is transformed into a "Marxist myth". In liberation theology, he declared, the "'people' is the antithesis of the hierarchy, the antithesis of all institutions, which are seen as oppressive powers. Ultimately anyone who participates in the class struggle is a member of the 'people'; the 'Church of the people' becomes the antagonist of the hierarchical Church."

Ratzinger did praise liberation theology in some respects, including its ideal of justice, its rejection of violence, and its stress on "the responsibility which Christians necessarily bear for the poor and oppressed". He subsequently stated that no one could be neutral in the face of injustice, and referred to the "crimes" of colonialism and the "scandal" of the arms race. Nonetheless, Latin American conservative media could claim that condemnation of "liberation theology" meant a rejection of such attitudes and an endorsement of conservative politics.

In 1984, it was reported that a meeting occurred between the CDF and the CELAM bishops, during which a rift developed between Ratzinger and some of the bishops, with Ratzinger issuing official condemnations of certain elements of liberation theology. These "Instructions" rejected as Marxist the idea that class struggle is fundamental to history, and rejected the interpretation of religious phenomena such as the Exodus and the Eucharist in political terms. Ratzinger further stated that liberation theology had a major flaw in that it attempted to apply Christ's sermon on the mount teachings about the poor to present social situations. He asserted that Christ's teaching on the poor meant that we will be judged when we die, with particular attention to how we personally have treated the poor.

Ratzinger also argued that liberation theology is not originally a "grass-roots" movement among the poor, but rather, a creation of Western intellectuals: "an attempt to test, in a concrete scenario, ideologies that have been invented in the laboratory by European theologians" and in a certain sense itself a form of "cultural imperialism". Ratzinger saw this as a reaction to the demise or near-demise of the "Marxist myth" in the West.

Throughout the 1990s, Ratzinger, as prefect of the CDF, continued to condemn these elements in liberation theology, and prohibited dissident priests from teaching such doctrines in the Catholic Church's name. Leonardo Boff was suspended and others were censured. Tissa Balasuriya, in Sri Lanka, was excommunicated. Sebastian Kappen, an Indian theologian, was also censured for his book Jesus and Freedom. Under Ratzinger's influence, theological formation schools were forbidden from using the Catholic Church's organization and grounds to teach unacceptable Marxist ideas from liberation theology.

=== Pope Francis era ===
According to Roberto Bosca, a historian at Austral University in Buenos Aires, Jorge Bergoglio (later Pope Francis) had "a reputation as an opponent of liberation theology during the 1970s"; he "accepted the premise of liberation theology, especially the option for the poor, but in a 'nonideological' fashion". Before becoming Pope, Bergoglio said, "The option for the poor comes from the first centuries of Christianity. It's the Gospel itself. If you were to read one of the sermons of the first fathers of the Church, from the second or third centuries, about how you should treat the poor, you'd say it was Maoist or Trotskyist. The Church has always had the honor of this preferential option for the poor. ... At the Second Vatican Council the Church was redefined as the People of God and this idea really took off at the Second Conference of the Latin-American bishops in Medellín." Bosca said Bergoglio was not opposed to liberation theology itself but to "giving a Catholic blessing to armed insurgency", specifically the Montoneros, who claimed liberation theology as part of their political ideology.

In Argentina there was a current of liberation theology called the theology of the people. Its main exponents were the theologians Lucio Gera and Rafael Tello. Bergoglio was much influenced by this trend, especially since he was Archbishop of Buenos Aires.

On September 11, 2013, Pope Francis hosted Gutiérrez in his residence, where he concelebrated Mass with Gutiérrez and Gerhard Müller, then Prefect of the Congregation for the Doctrine of the Faith. Some saw this meeting as a sign of warming relations between the hierarchy and liberation theologians. The same month, L'Osservatore Romano published an article by Archbishop Müller praising Gutiérrez. On January 18, 2014, Pope Francis met with Arturo Paoli, an Italian priest whom the Pope knew from Paoli's long service in Argentina. Paoli is recognized as an exponent of liberation theology before the term arose and the meeting was seen as a sign of "reconciliation" between the Vatican and the liberationists.

Miguel d'Escoto, a Maryknoll priest from Nicaragua, had been sanctioned with an a divinis suspension from his public functions in 1984 by Pope John Paul II, for political activity in the leftist Sandinista government in Nicaragua. Pope Francis lifted the suspension in August 2014, in response to a request by d'Escoto.

At a 2015 press conference in the Vatican hosted by Caritas International, the federation of Catholic relief agencies, Gutiérrez noted that while there had been some difficult moments in the past dialogue with the Congregation for the Doctrine of the Faith, liberation theology had never been condemned. Although he saw an increasingly clear emphasis on Church teachings on the poor, he did not consider that liberation theology was undergoing a rehabilitation, since it had never been "dishabilitated".

In January 2019, during the World Youth Day in Panama, Pope Francis discussed changing attitudes to liberation theology during an extended discussion with a group of thirty Jesuits from Central America. He noted that he had a devotion to the martyred Salvadoran Jesuit priest, Rutilio Grande, even before he came to know Óscar Romero well. Francis commented that "Today we old people laugh about how worried we were about liberation theology. What was missing then was communication to the outside about how things really were."

=== Outside Latin America ===
==== Romania ====
The general of Romania's communist secret police, Ion Mihai Pacepa, claimed that the KGB had created liberation theology. Commentators, notably John L. Allen of Crux on the left and Damian Thompson of The Spectator on the right, suspected that those claims were exaggerated.

==== United States ====
Latin American liberation theology met with approval in the United States, but its use of "Marxist concepts" led in the mid-1980s to an admonition by the Vatican's Congregation for the Doctrine of the Faith (CDF). While stating that "in itself, the expression 'theology of liberation' is a thoroughly valid term," the prefect Cardinal Ratzinger rejected certain forms of Latin American liberation theology for focusing on institutionalized or systemic sin and for identifying Catholic Church hierarchy in South America as members of the same privileged class that had long been oppressing indigenous populations from the arrival of Pizarro onward.

In 1983 US Vice President George H. W. Bush said he could not comprehend how Catholic theologians could harmonize Catholicism and Marxism and support revolutionaries in Central America: "I'm puzzled. I just don't understand it."
