= Libertatis Nuntius =

Libertatis Nuntius is a 1984 document by the Congregation for the Doctrine of the Faith, written by Cardinal Joseph Ratzinger (later Pope Benedict XVI). The document addresses liberation theology.

== Contents ==
In the document, the Vatican condemned the use of Marxist analysis by liberation theologians. It went as far as to state that:

To the extent that they remain fully Marxist, these currents continue to be based on certain fundamental tenets which are not compatible with the Christian conception of humanity and society. In this context, certain formulas are not neutral, but keep the meaning they had in the original Marxist doctrine. This is the case with the "class-struggle." This expression remains pregnant with the interpretation that Marx gave it, so it cannot be taken as the equivalent of "severe social conflict", in an empirical sense. Those who use similar formulas, while claiming to keep only certain elements of the Marxist analysis and yet to reject the analysis taken as a whole, maintain at the very least a serious confusion in the minds of their readers.

== Libertatis Conscientia ==
A follow up document, titled Libertatis Conscientia, was released in 1986, again authored by Ratzinger.

== See also ==
- Catholicism and socialism
- Camilism
- Catholic communism
- Liberation theology
- Latin American Liberation Theology
- Gustavo Gutierrez
