= Ruth Padilla DeBorst =

Latin American evangelical theologian

External videos
- Fleeing the hot spots: Climate change, migration and mission (2021)

Ruth Padilla DeBorst is a Latin American evangelical theologian affiliated with the Latin American Theological Fellowship and based in Costa Rica.

== Biography ==
Padilla DeBorst was born in Colombia as the eldest daughter of an American mother, Catharine Feser Padilla, and an Ecuadorian father, the theologian René Padilla. She attended high school and university in Argentina, receiving her B.Ed. at the Instituto Nacional Superior en Lenguas Vivas in 1984, an M.A. in Interdisciplinary Studies at Wheaton College in 1987, and a PhD in theology from Boston University in 2016, under the supervision of Dana L. Robert. She is known for being an advocate of integral mission, an evangelical form of liberation theology.

She is a former president of the Latin American Theological Fellowship (known in Spanish as Fraternidad Teológica Latinoamericana or FTL), a movement she also led as General Secretary from 2008-2012. She was a keynote speaker at the evangelical conferences of the Lausanne 2010, held in Cape Town, South Africa. and Lausanne 2024, in Incheon, South Korea.

Her first husband was killed in Ecuador when she was eight months pregnant and with two small children. She currently lives with her second husband, James Padilla DeBorst, as members of Casa Adobe, an intentional Christian Community in Santo Domingo, Heredia, Costa Rica. They both serve with A Rocha Costa Rica, INFEMIT (The International Fellowship for Mission as Transformation), and the Comunidad de Estudios Teológicos Interdisciplinarios.

In Fall 2022, Padilla DeBorst joined the faculty of Western Theological Seminary as the Richard C. Oudersluys Associate Professor of World Christianity.

== Works ==
- Cranston, David; Padilla DeBorst, Ruth, eds. (2013). Mission as Transformation: Learning from Catalysts. Eugene, OR: Wipf & Stock. ISBN 978-1-62564-612-5.

== See also ==
- Integral mission
- Latin American Theological Fellowship
