= Gustavo Gutiérrez =

Peruvian Catholic priest, philosopher and theologian (1928–2024)

The Reverend Gustavo Gutiérrez OP
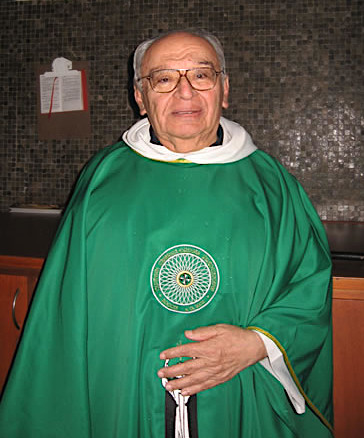
- Gutiérrez in 2007
- Born: Gustavo Gutiérrez-Merino Díaz; 8 June 1928; Lima, Peru
- Died: 22 October 2024 (aged 96); Lima, Peru
- Education: Catholic University of Leuven; Catholic University of Lyon
- Occupations: Priest; professor
- Employers: University of Notre Dame; Pontifical Catholic University of Peru
- Known for: Latin American liberation theology; preferential option for the poor
- Notable work: A Theology of Liberation
- Awards: Legion of Honor 1993; Member – American Academy of Arts and Sciences 2002; Prince of Asturias Award 2003; Pacem in Terris Peace and Freedom Award 2016

Ecclesiastical career
- Religion: Christianity
- Church: Roman Catholic Church
- Ordained: 1959
- Congregations: Iglesia Cristo Redentor, Rímac

Gustavo Gutiérrez-Merino Díaz (8 June 1928 – 22 October 2024) was a Peruvian Catholic philosopher, theologian, and Dominican priest who was one of the founders of Latin American liberation theology. His 1971 book A Theology of Liberation is considered pivotal to the formation of liberation theology at large. He held the John Cardinal O'Hara Professorship of Theology at the University of Notre Dame and was a visiting professor at universities in North America and Europe.

Born in Lima, Gutiérrez studied medicine and literature at the National University of San Marcos before deciding to become a priest. He began studying theology at the Theology Faculty of Leuven in Belgium and in Lyon, France.

His theological focus connected salvation and liberation through the preferential option for the poor, with an emphasis on improving the material conditions of the impoverished. Gutiérrez proposed that revelation and eschatology have been excessively idealized at the expense of efforts to bring about the Kingdom of God on Earth. His methodology was often critical of the social and economic injustice he believed to be responsible for poverty in Latin America, and of the Catholic clergy. The central pastoral question of his work was: "How do we convey to the poor that God loves them?"

== Early life and education ==
Gustavo Gutiérrez was born in the Montserrat barrio of Lima on 8 June 1928 to mestizo parents of Hispanic and Quechua descent. He was afflicted with osteomyelitis as an adolescent and was frequently bed-ridden. He had to use a wheelchair from age 12 to 18. He described this time as a formative experience, claiming it instilled the value of hope through prayer and the love of family and friends. Gutiérrez lived in Barranco, and studied at Colegio San Luis; among his close friends during those years was Javier Mariátegui, with whom he later studied medicine. He described this experience as having had a profound impact on his interest in theology.

Gutiérrez initially studied medicine at the National University of San Marcos in Lima in order to become a psychiatrist. He also became involved with Catholic Action, which greatly influenced his later theological arguments.

While in medical school, Gutiérrez realized he wanted to become a priest. He completed his theological studies in the Theology Faculty of Leuven in Belgium and at Lyon in France, where he studied under Henri de Lubac, Yves Congar, Marie Dominique Chenu, Christian Ducoq, and several others. It was also here where Gutiérrez was introduced to the Dominican and Jesuit ideologies, and was influenced by the work of Edward Schillebeeckx, Karl Rahner, Hans Küng, and Johann Baptist Metz. His time in Europe influenced Gutiérrez to discuss the openness of the Church to the contemporary world. He was also influenced by Protestant theologians such as Karl Barth and social scientists such as François Perroux and his idea of development. In 1959, Gutiérrez was ordained a priest.

While studying in Europe, Gutiérrez was exposed to other, non-religious thinkers who had a profound impact on his ideology and the eventual formation of Latin American liberation theology. At the Faculty of Theology in Lyon, he studied Karl Marx, Sigmund Freud – on whom he did a philosophy licentiate at the University of Leuven – and evolutionary theorists traditionally opposed or discouraged by the church. Marx's discussion of class struggle and the material conditions of poverty provided Gutiérrez a framework for understanding socio-economic inequality.

== Foundations of liberation theology ==
When he returned to Peru in the late 1950s, Gutiérrez began to formulate his understanding of Latin American "reality" – the foundation and driving force of Latin American liberation theology. He wrote: "I come from a continent in which more than 60% of the population lives in a state of poverty, and 82% of those find themselves in extreme poverty." Gutiérrez focused his efforts on the rediscovery of love thy neighbor as the central axiom of Christian life. He contended that the European theology he had studied did have relevance to the oppressive material conditions in Latin America. In 2003, Gutiérrez reminisced that his "parishioners in Lima would ... teach me volumes about hope in the midst of suffering". The relationship of suffering with Christianity would inspire his book On Job, published in 1986. In his parish ministry, Gutiérrez was at one time pastor of the Iglesia Cristo Redentor (Church of Christ the Redeemer) in Rímac, Peru.

Gutiérrez drafted an outline of his theological proposal at the conference "Towards a Theology of Liberation" during the Second Meeting of Priests and Laity in Chimbote, Peru, between 21 and 25 July 1968. In this proposal, he cited on multiple occasions Vatican II's Gaudium et spes and Paul VI's Populorum progressio. To Gutiérrez, the source of the problems of Latin America was the sin manifested in an unjust social structure. His solution to this problem was to emphasize the dignity of the poor by prioritizing the glory of God present in them. This perspective would be refined over the next three years, until Gutiérrez published A Theology of Liberation in 1971.

Largely as a result of his work, Latin American liberation theology thus emerged as a biblical analysis of poverty. Gutiérrez distinguished two forms of poverty: a "scandalous state" and a "spiritual childhood". He noted that, while the former is abhorred by God, the second is valued. Gutiérrez identified that each form of poverty was present in Latin America, wherein one hungers for bread and for God. It is only through the manifestation of a committed faith that the purposes of God can be manifested to man, regardless of the color or social class under which he was born. Liberation theology insists on prioritizing the gift of life as the supreme manifestation of God.

Gutiérrez asserted that his understanding of poverty as a "scandalous state" is reflected in Luke's beatitude "Blessed are you poor, for the kingdom of God is yours", whereas his interpretation of it as "spiritual childhood" has precedent in Matthew's verse, "Blessed are the poor in spirit, for theirs is the kingdom of Heaven". He argued that there are forms of poverty beyond economic.

== Ideology ==
Gutiérrez saw Christian salvation as something that can be brought about by human action. He argued that Christian liberation has three levels - political ("liberation of the people from the political and economic structures which oppress them"), psychological ("liberation of the human being from those things that do not let him or her take on his or her own destiny"), and lastly theological ("liberation of the person from sin by communion with God"). He saw these three levels as interdependent, and thus dependent on each other. The final salvation of humanity would be carried out through a "historical structure" of liberation, defined by Gutiérrez as emergence of a socialist system. He wrote "that a socialist system is more in accord with the Christian principles of true brotherhood, justice and peace... only socialism can enable Latin America to achieve true development..."

In his support for socialism, Gutiérrez eschewed reformism and called for a social revolution instead. He called Catholics to reject "naive reformism" and insisted that the Catholic Church must "break its ties with the present order', become "one with the poor" and dedicate itself to the "revolutionary cause". In this, he wrote that "only by overcoming a society divided into classes ... by eliminating the private appropriation of wealth created by human toil, can we build the foundation of a more just society". In 1985, when asked if liberation theologians could support welfare-oriented capitalism as a basis for a preferential option for the poor, he replied: "I don't know any who do." He praised Marxism as "simply the best theory available for ensuring that theology is adequately contextual".

Stressing his support for a socialist revolution, Gutiérrez stressed: "Hence we speak of social revolution, not reform; of liberation, not development; of socialism, not the modernization of the prevailing system. ‘Realists’ call these statements romantic and utopian. And they should, for the rationality of these statements is of a kind quite unfamiliar to them." Explaining his solution to the poverty in Latin America, he wrote: "Only the complete destruction of the present state of things, the profound transformation of the ownership system, the coming to power of the exploited class, a social revolution will put an end to this dependency. They alone will allow a transition to a socialist society, or at least will make it possible." Gutiérrez was a friend of Camilo Torres Restrepo, a liberation theologian who heeded his calls for participating in a socialist revolution.

Marxist influences were prevalent in Gutiérrez's political views. Cameron Swathwood argues that "the overriding theme in Gutiérrez’s conception of liberation theology is its pro-Marxist and anti-capitalist sentiments", and noted that Gutiérrez used Marxist terminology and always referred to the "bourgeois, capitalists, and multinational corporations" in a negative tone. Gutiérrez also cited Che Guevara, and argued that "the current economic system is purposefully designed to funnel all its resources to the top, away from the oppressed masses beneath". Historian Edward Norman called Gutiérrez "the most distinguished of the Marxist theologians in South America." The main Marxist revolutionaries and intellectual that Gutiérrez cited and incorporated ideas from were José Carlos Mariátegui, Karl Marx, Friedrich Engels, Che Guevara, Fidel Castro and Aníbal Quijano. On Gutiérrez's Marxist thought, Javier Valiente Núñez wrote: "The novelty of Gutiérrez’s use of Marxism, with the only precedent of Camilo Torres, is precisely the confrontation of his Latin American decolonial Marxism, which is quite complex, heterogeneous and indefinite, with the Christian teaching."

However, Gutiérrez's political thought also rejected and modified some aspects of Marxism. Enrique Dussel noted the absence of dialectical materialism in liberation theology:

Liberation theologians, like Gustavo Gutierrez, Juan Luis Segundo, and Leonardo Boff, do not assume the dialectical materialism of Engels, Lenin or Stalin, but a more "humanist" Marx by Gramsci, Marcuse or Bloch. This Marxist "humanist" perspective that is focused on a social criticism of the reality is the one used by these theologians in order to elaborate a scientific approach to the causes of poverty and exclusion in Latin America.

Gutiérrez personally highlighted that a single area where liberation theology differed from Marxism was dependency theory, which liberation theology embraced. He acknowledged that while dependency theory itself had many Marxist elements, it "cannot simply be reduced to the Marxist version."

== Las Casas Institute and move to United States ==
In 1974, Gutiérrez founded the Lima branch of the Bartolomé de Las Casas Institute. The Institute, in its mission statement, sought to use theology as a means of addressing contemporary social issues and educating through research, engagement with lawmakers, and collaboration with grassroots organizations.

After facing criticism for his work (including from Cardinal Juan Luis Cipriani Thorne, the Archbishop of Lima), Gutiérrez left Peru and joined the Dominican Order near the turn of the millennium, (Note: Some sources say 1999, others say 2001.) taking a teaching post at the University of Notre Dame in the United States. There, he held the John Cardinal O'Hara Professorship of Theology. He later taught at the University of Michigan, Harvard, Cambridge, UC Berkeley, and University of Montréal and other schools.

== Writings on the option for the poor ==
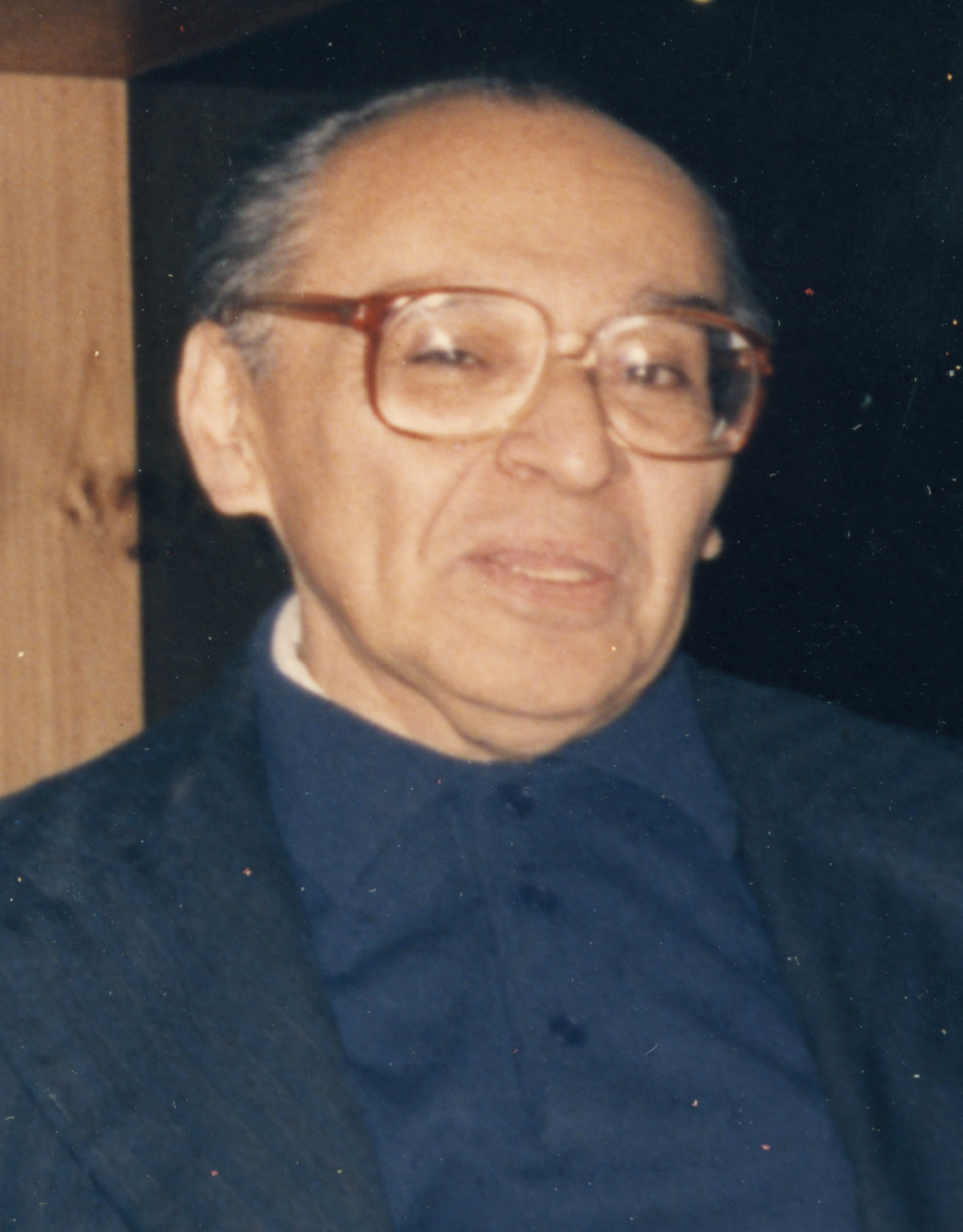
Gutiérrez in 1988

Gutiérrez called for understanding the reality of the poor, and contended that being poor is not simply lacking the economic resources for development. On the contrary, Gutiérrez understood poverty as "a way of living, of thinking, of loving, of praying, of believing and waiting, of spending free time, of fighting for life." He simultaneously emphasized that poverty is the result of flawed social institutions. While many theologians oversimplify poverty's social roots, for Gutiérrez the origin of poverty was considerably more complex. In Latin America, it originates from the times of the conquest and to that is added several political, geographical, and personal factors.

The proclamation of the gospel in the midst of the unjust situation in Latin America leads to a praxis based on principles derived from the word of God. In the article "Theology and Poverty", Gutiérrez recalled that this option should lead to three well-defined actions, with the preferential option for the poor unfolding as a fundamental axis of the Christian life on three levels:

1. The announcement and testimony of the reign of God denounces poverty.
2. The intelligence of faith reveals essential aspects of God and provides a perspective for theological work.
3. Walking in the footsteps of Jesus, otherwise known as spirituality, is, on the deepest level, the basis on which everything else rests.

The main biblical foundation for this praxis lies in the kenotic incarnation of Christ. To Gutiérrez, the ministry of Christ among the rejected and despised of his time is a clear example for the contemporary Church. Furthermore, "the incarnation is an act of love. Christ becomes man, dies and rises to liberate us, and makes us enjoy freedom. To die and be resurrected with Christ is to overcome death and enter into a new life. The cross and the resurrection seal our freedom." The freedom of Christ is seen by Gutiérrez as the source of spiritual and economic freedom.

Theological reflection on liberation extends beyond a simple discourse lacking in practical and concrete implications. Reflection on the situation of the poor leads to what liberation theologians call "liberating praxis", where they attempt to rectify the process by which the faith of the Church builds the economic, spiritual and intellectual liberation of socially oppressed peoples as fulfillment of the kingdom of God. The liberating praxis, then, has its basis in the love that God manifests for us and in the sense of solidarity and fellowship that should exist in interpersonal relationships among the children of God. Gutiérrez developed several concepts in concert with education activist and philosopher Paulo Freire, whose 1968 seminal work Pedagogy of the Oppressed explored the concept of praxis and a preferential option for the poor.

For Gutiérrez, liberating praxis is a slightly more complex process, as the author distinguishes historical praxis from liberating praxis. History is a fundamental part of Gutiérrez's thought, because faith is lived in history, and all the conclusions of reflection must be reflected in the struggle to humanize the oppressed:

== Death and funeral ==
Gutiérrez died from pneumonia in a convent in Lima on 22 October 2024, at the age of 96. On 23 October 2024, a wake service, vespers, and Mass celebrating the memory of Gutiérrez were all held at the Dominican residence in Lima where he resided. On 24 October, Gutiérrez was granted a public funeral at Basilica of the Most Holy Rosary, presided over by Archbishop of Lima Carlos Castillo Mattasoglio. Moments before the funeral began, a video broadcast of Pope Francis aired in which he paid to tribute to Gutiérrez, describing him as "A man of the Church who knew how to be silent when he had to be silent, who knew how to suffer when it was his turn to suffer, who knew how to carry forward so much apostolic fruit and so much rich theology." The pope's video broadcast, which took place from Rome, had been prepared by the Archbishopric of Lima.

It was estimated that more than 1,000 people, in person as well as virtually, attended Gutiérrez's funeral. Among those who spoke at his funeral were UNEC national advisor and Chiclayo leader Yolanda Díaz, cartoonist Juan Acevado and Provincial Superior of the Dominicans of Peru Fr. Romulo Vasquez Gavidia, OP. Following the funeral, Gutiérrez's remains were taken to Cristo Redentor Parish in Rímac, where he served as the priest. Castillo delivered a homily, while Father Andrés Gallego, who replaced Gutiérrez as the parish priest, delivered a farewell prayer. In addition to his Basilica of the Most Holy Rosary ceremony, Gutiérrez's Cristo Redentor Parish and burial ceremonies were open to the public as well. Gutiérrez's body is buried in El Ángel Cemetery.

== Legacy ==
Gutiérrez was an influential figure within 20th century theology, and responses to his work have been polarized. Arthur F. McGovern, assessing liberation theology in light of its 20th-century critics, says that there was broad support for the ecclesial movement in Latin America that began with the episcopal conferences at Medellin and Puebla, and broad support for the idea of the "option for the poor", but the political implications of liberation theology, and the impact of "polarizing terms" such as "capitalism and marxism", remain divisive. Assessment must also be more nuanced in the 21st century because there is now a variety of "liberation theologies", and not just one approach.

Liberation theology was intended as a call to all believers in Latin America to act on the biblical commitment to the poor. Gutiérrez's message on material and economic conditions serves to place inequality in both religious and political discourse.

Gutiérrez's thought has influenced theology, both in Latin America and abroad. The Peruvian Cardinal, Juan Landázuri Ricketts, was directly influenced by Gutiérrez, who authored the Medellin Conference's final report, which was "the church's decision to make a pastoral option for the poor." This influence can be observed from the evangelical proposal of the integral mission developed years after the origin of liberation, to the development of social ministries within the evangelical churches in the last decades.

His friends included the German theologian Gerhard Ludwig Müller, the former Prefect of the Congregation for the Doctrine of the Faith. Müller, after studying his thought, stated: "The theology of Gustavo Gutiérrez, how it is considered, is orthodox because it is orthopractic and teaches us the correct Christian way of acting, since it derives from authentic faith." On his 90th birthday, in 2018, Pope Francis thanked him for his contributions "to the church and humanity through your theological service and your preferential love for the poor and discarded of society." While Gutiérrez's propositions were never censored by the Church, he was asked to modify some of them.

Gutiérrez also took pains to prevent his theology from being drawn into the wider network of controversial stances adopted by some of his colleagues. For example, once in the 1970s in Córdoba, Argentina, he refused to begin his lecture until Father Jerónimo Podestá, a fellow liberation theologian who argued for the right of priests to marry, left the room.

After Gutierrez's death in 2024, Pope Francis called him "a great man of the Church".

== Criticisms ==
In 1984, the Holy See, under Pope John Paul II, criticized aspects of liberation theology, taking particular issue with its use of Marxist economic theory. Cardinal Joseph Ratzinger asked Peruvian bishops to examine Gutiérrez's writings, voicing concerns that Gutiérrez's arguments embodied a concerning "idealization of faith". As a result, Gutiérrez and liberation theology were the subjects of a 36-page Vatican report, which declared Marxism to be incompatible with Catholic teachings.

According to Arthur F. McGovern, assessing the movement and its critics is complicated by the fact that it became the subject of popular controversy outside of theological and academic circles, including stories and advertisements in the popular press that evoked passionate responses by identifying liberation theology with Communism and fear of radicalism in Latin American politics.

== Accolades ==
Gutiérrez was a member of the Peruvian Academy of Language. In 1993, he was awarded the Legion of Honor by the French government for his tireless work. In 2000, Brown University awarded Gutiérrez an honorary Doctor of Divinity. In 2002, Gutiérrez was elected to the American Academy of Arts and Sciences and, in 2003, he received the Príncipe de Asturias award. In 2014, he was awarded the Joseph B. and Toby Gittler Prize from Brandeis University. In 2016, he received the Pacem in Terris Award from St. Ambrose University.

== Selected works ==
- On the Side of the Poor: The Theology of Liberation. Co-authored with Cardinal Gerhard Ludwig Müller. Orbis Books, 2015: ISBN 978-1626981157
- In the Company of the Poor: conversations between Dr. Paul Farmer and Fr. Gustavo Gutiérrez. Ed. Michael Griffin and Jennie Weiss Block. Orbis Books, 2013: ISBN 978-1626980501
- Las Casas: In Search of the Poor of Jesus Christ, trans. Robert R. Barr (Maryknoll: Orbis, 1993). Originally published as En busca de los pobres de Jesucristo: El pensamiento de Bartolomé de las Casas (Lima: CEP, 1992).
- The God of Life, trans. Matthew J. O'Connell (Maryknoll: Orbis, 1991). Originally published as El Dios de la vida (Lima: CEP, 1989).
- On Job: God-Talk and the Suffering of the Innocent, trans. Matthew J. O'Connell (Maryknoll: Orbis, 1987). Originally published as Hablar de Dios desde el sufrimiento del inocente (Lima: CEP, 1986).
- The Truth Shall Make You Free: Confrontations, trans. Matthew J. O'Connell (Maryknoll: Orbis, 1990). Originally published as La verdad los hará libres: Confrontaciones (Lima: CEP, 1986).
- We Drink from Our Own Wells: The Spiritual Journey of a People, 20th anniversary ed., trans. Matthew J. O'Connell (Maryknoll: Orbis, 2003; 1st ed., Maryknoll: Orbis, 1984). Originally published as Beber en su propio pozo: En el itinerario espiritual de un pueblo (Lima: CEP, 1983).
- A Theology of Liberation: History, Politics, and Salvation, 15th anniversary ed., trans. Caridad Inda and John Eagleson (Maryknoll: Orbis, 1988; 1st ed., Maryknoll: Orbis, 1973). Originally published as Teología de la liberación: Perspectivas (Lima: CEP, 1971).

== See also ==
- Liberation theology
- Black theology
- Christian communism
- Catholic communism
- Christian left
- Christian socialism
- Progressive Christianity
- Social gospel
- Social justice
