= Liberation theology in El Salvador =

Liberation theology gained traction in El Salvador as a political and theological movement that began in the early 1970s in response to the actions carried out against the marginalized by the military dictatorship in El Salvador.

== History ==
Liberation theology was largely developed in, and introduced to El Salvador by theologians, Jesuits, and the Episcopal Conference of Latin America following the Second Vatican Council (Vatican II). The philosophy spread and became popular among poor and working class Catholics, who had faced inequality and persecution by the military dictatorship.

Beginning in the mid-1970s, El Salvador was faced with greater poverty, displacement and inequality following a war with Honduras, the 1973 oil crisis, and continued government crackdowns on political opposition. Peasants began organizing against the government and the wealthy elites who owned most of the land. These events, along with the continued state repression, the formation of government-backed death squads and left-wing guerilla organizations, led to the Salvadoran Civil War in 1979.

Supporters of liberation theology typically spoke out against both the government and the guerilla fighters. Figures like Archbishop Óscar Romero used their influence to advocate for the persecuted and call on both sides to lay down arms and put an end the violence. During the war, Romero operated radio sermons in which he spread awareness to the atrocities being committed and begged both sides to make peace.

== Notable figures ==
- Ignacio Ellacuría, Spanish-born Jesuit priest and theologian who was assassinated in 1989.
- Jon Sobrino, Jesuit priest and theologian.
- Saint Óscar Romero, Archbishop of San Salvador. He consistently applied the theology's principles to his advocacy, despite never publicly aligning himself with it.
- Blessed Rutilio Grande, Jesuit priest who was assassinated in 1977.
- Ignacio Martín-Baró, Jesuit priest and philosopher who was assassinated in 1989.
- Segundo Montes, Jesuit priest and scholar who was assassinated in 1989.
- Cosma Spessotto, Italian-born Franciscan who was assassinated in 1980.

== See also ==
- Latin American liberation theology
- Liberation theology
- Salvadoran Civil War
