= Transmodernity =

Philosophical concept

Transmodernity is a philosophical concept used by the Spanish philosopher and feminist Rosa María Rodríguez Magda in her 1989 essay La sonrisa de Saturno: Hacia una teoría transmoderna, later developed in "El modelo Frankenstein" and finally fully expanded in "Transmodernidad". Her approach, based on Hegelian logic, views modernity, postmodernity, and transmodernity as a dialectic triad in which transmodernity is critical of both modernism and postmodernism, but incorporates elements of both. Transmodernism, as first identified in the philosophical work of Rodriguez (2004), is an umbrella term that connotes the emerging socio-cultural, economic, political and philosophical shift way beyond postmodernity (Ateljevic, 2013:200) which is much more wide, deep and radical than what dominant economists and politicians call globalization (Ghisi, 2010) Other interpretations on this term have been elaborated in conjunction with the cultural movement of transmodernism founded by Argentinian-Mexican philosopher Enrique Dussel. The concept of transmodernity has also been used to re-work the notion of postmodernity, highlighting its structural relation to globalization and informatisation.

== Transmodernity in art and culture ==
Inspired by this philosophical concept, Berlin based artists and filmmakers Lula Dahringer and Halea Isabelle Kala launched the documentary film and platform project Transmodernity which contextualises the term in the realm of popular culture and explores the lived version of this term.

The Transmodernity Project was launched in 2020 and explores the micro and macro levels of transformation while seeking to connect, educate and empower. It acknowledges the interconnectivity and interdependency of everything and celebrates change regardless of its size, with a focus on evolving, encouraging and nourishing transformation.

‘Transmodernity - The New Now’ is a documentary about changemakers that challenge and transform the current system by exploring new possibilities for transitioning into a new paradigm with alternative social, economic and cultural approaches. It raises the question of how reality can be possible in different ways. It is a portrait of our time and its currents, created by a mosaic of changemakers and their projects. It is philosophy manifested in real life.

== See also ==
- Remodernism
- Rosa María Rodríguez Magda
