= Émile Pin =

French Jesuit social researcher and liberarion theologist

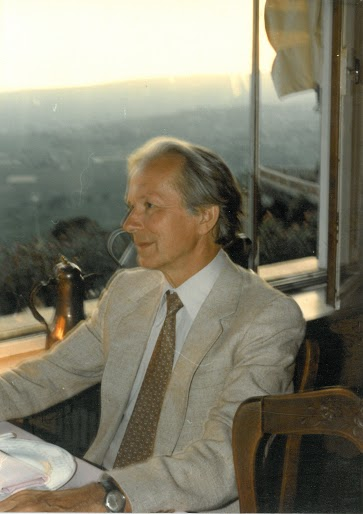
- Born: Émile Jean Pin; 1921; Lyon, France
- Died: 2006 (aged 84–85)
- Education: University of Lyon (Ph.D., 1956)
- Occupations: Jesuit priest, social activist, scholar

Émile Jean Pin (French: [pɛ̃]; 1921–2006) was a French Jesuit priest, social activist, and scholar. He was known for his public opposition to the Catholic Church's attempts to block the legalization of divorce in Italy.

== Early life and education ==
Pin entered the Jesuit order at the age of 16. Two years later, World War II broke out and, as a young Jesuit student Pin smuggled documents for the Resistance. He also served as an officer in the French Labor Service.

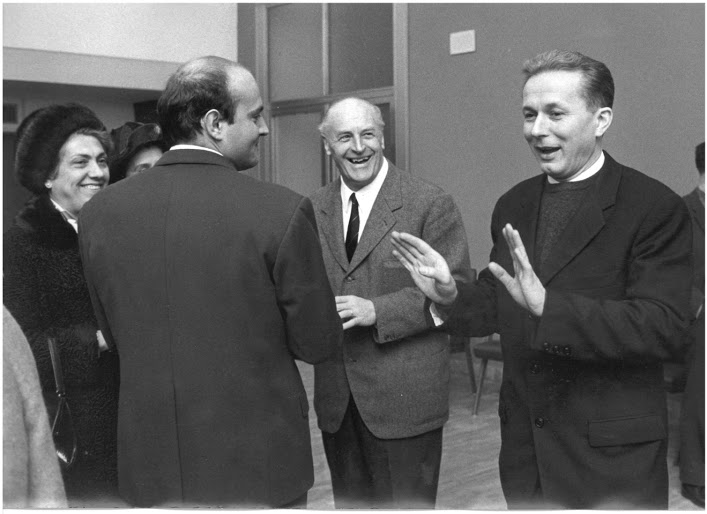

Pin received a master's degree in economics and political science from the University of Paris (1949). In 1950, he completed a master's in sociology from the Sorbonne, a master's degree in law and economics (law degree) from the Faculte de Droit in Paris and a Diplome de l'Institut de Sciences Politiques de Paris. He received a Licentiate in Theology from the University of Lyon in 1954. He received a Doctor of Letters (Ph.D. in sociology) from the University of Lyon in 1956 and a post-doctoral fellowship in sociology from the University of Chicago (1957–1958). His doctoral dissertation, "Practique Religieuse et Classes Sociales", a study of the social correlates of various religious practices in a parish of the City of Lyon, came to the attention of Pope Paul VI, who called Pin to Rome to serve as professor of religious sociology and social classes at the Pontifical Gregorian University.

== Career ==
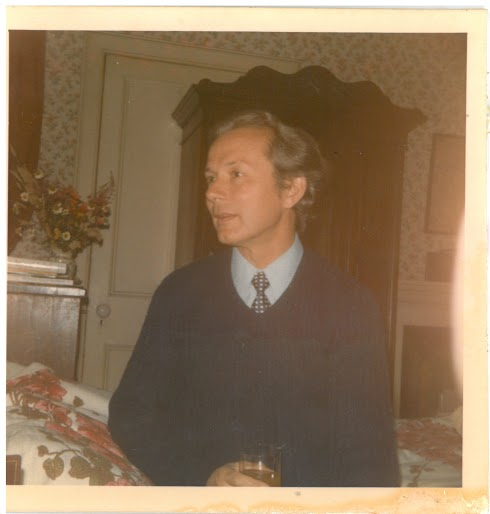

Pin founded and directed the International Center for Social Research (CIRIS) at the Pontifical Gregorian University, Rome, the Vatican's first and only international social research center.

Pin was one of the pioneers in the field of liberation theology. His books, The Church and the Latin-American Revolution, Les Classes Sociales, Elementos Para Una Sociologia del Catolicismo Latino-Americano and Introduction a l'Etude Sociologique des Paroisse Catholique are classics in the field of liberation theology.

Pin also lectured on liberation theology at Ivan Illich's Center for Intercultural Formation in Cuernavaca, Mexico, and Petropolis, Brazil, during 1962–1970.

Out of CIRIS, Pin conducted research to determine whether the church was actually meeting the needs of the faithful. He was the first to introduce a method of social research in which he conducted face-to-face interviews with a representative sample of the study population. Pin's methods became standard in social research. His book The Religiosity of the Romans debunked many popular beliefs about Catholics and their religious needs and practices. Pin conducted the worldwide survey of the Jesuit order and was the secretary general of the International Conference of Religious Sociology.

In the early 1970s, Pin was laicized by Pope Paul VI and appointed by Vassar College to serve as full professor and chair of the Department of Sociology until 1990. To mark his new identity, he began using his middle name, Jean, as his first name. He completed a Master of Social Work at Fordham University in 1984. In his last professional position, he served as a psychotherapist and social advocate for Catholic Charities. In 1992, he filed an unsuccessful lawsuit against Vassar, citing age discrimination based on their policy of requiring professors to retire at age 70.

== Personal life ==
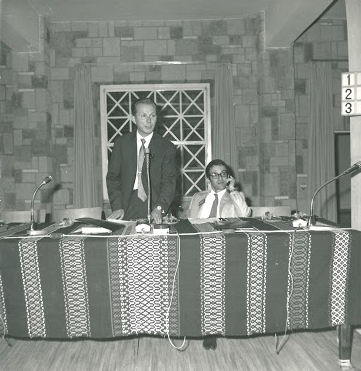

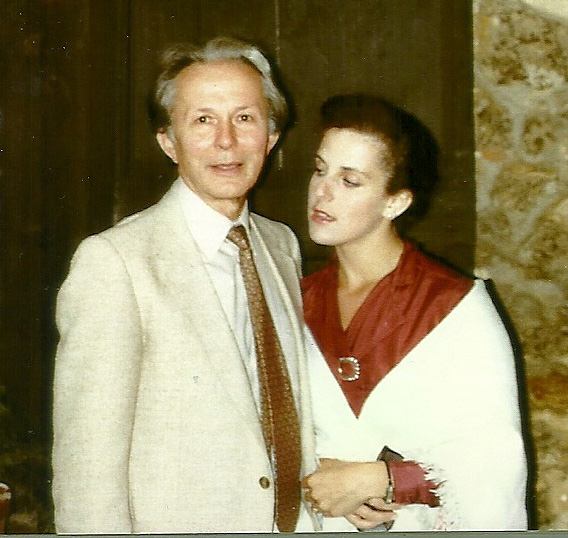

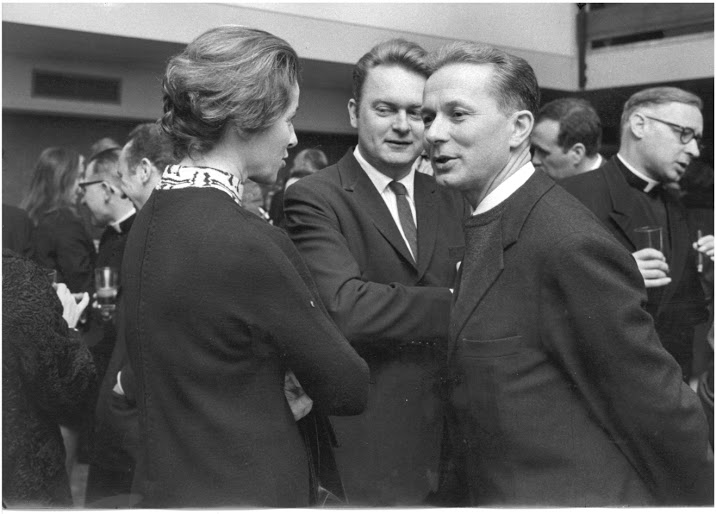

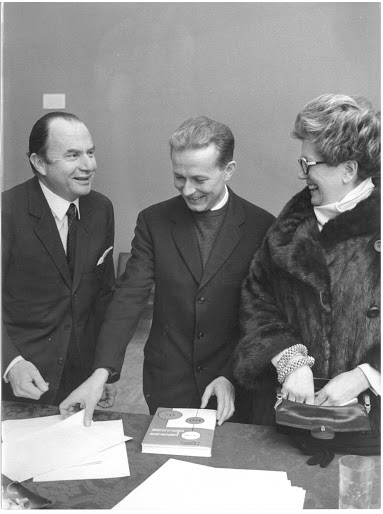

After he was laicized, Pin was married to a German woman for ten years. He was then married for 27 years to Jamie Turndorf until his death. Together, they co-authored The Pleasure of Your Company: A Socio-Psychological Analysis of Modern Sociability.

In 2006, Pin died of a bee sting while traveling with his wife in Italy.

== Select bibliography ==
=== Books ===
- Practique Religieuse et Classes Sociales Dans une Paroisse Urbaine, (Paris: Spes, 1956)
- Introduction a l'Etude Sociologique des Paroisse Catholique, (Paris: Action Populaire, 1956)
- Les Classes Sociales, (Paris: Spes, 1962). Translations in Spanish and Portuguese
- Elementos Para Una Sociologia del Catolicismo Latino-Americano, (Madrid-Fribourg: FERES,1965)
- The Church and the Latin-American Revolution, (New York: Sheed and Ward, 1966). In collaboration with Francois Houtart.
- Sociology of Christianity, an International Bibliography, (Rome: Gregorian University Press, Vol. I, 1964, Vol. II, 1968). In collaboration with Herve Carrier and Alfredo Fasola-Bologna.
- Essais de Sociologie Religieuse, (Paris: Spes, 1967). In collaboration with Herve Carrier. Translation into Italian.
- Cooperazione e Socializzazione, (Rome: Gregorian University Press, 1968). In collaboration with Bruno Benvenuti and Fabio Oberdan Buratto.
- La Religiosita dei Romani, (Rome: Ed. Dehoniani, 1974).
- The Pleasure of Your Company: A Socio-Psychological Analysis of Modern Sociability, (New York: Praeger, 1985). In collaboration with Jamie Turndorf.

=== Articles ===
- "A Follow-Up Study of 300 Ex-Clients of a Drug-Free Narcotic Treatment Program in New York City", in American Journal of Drug and Alcohol Abuse, 3 (3, 1976) 397-407
- "La Vocation de la Sociologie Religieuse", in Revue de l'Action Populaire, 52 (1951)
- "Can the Urban Parish be a Community?" Gregorianum, 41 (1960) 393–423, reprod. in Social Compass, 8 (1961) 503-535
- "Dix Ans de Sociologie Religieuse", in Revue de l'Action Populaire, 145 (1961) 217–229, translated into Italian in Aggiornamenti Sociali, 12 (1961) 71-88 and into Spanish in C.I.A.S., 10 (1961) 1-30
- "La Religion et le Passage d' une Civilisation Pre-Industrielle a une Civilisation Industrielle", in Revista Internazionale di Scienze Economiche e Commerciali, 10 (1961) 3-22
- "Effetti Psico-Sociologici della Riforma Agraria, in Revista di Sociologia, (May-Aug. 1964) 79-102
- "Apostolic Religious Institutes and Socio-Cultural Change", in Nouvelle Revue Theologique, (Apr. 1965)
- "La S.I.I.A.E.C. (Secretariat International des Ingenieurs, des Agronomes, et des Cadres Economiques Catholiques) et la Pastorale de'Ensemble", in Actes de la XV Assemblee Generale du SIIAEC, Rome, (1967)
- "Jesus Freaks and Catholic Pentecostals", in Social Compass, (Nov. 1974) 227-239
- "Le Futur Americain: Ou est Passee la Gauche? in Projet, Paris, (Dec. 1976) 1140-1154
