= Liberation theology in Canada =

Liberation theology in Canada has had a significant history in the later 20th and early 21st centuries.

== History ==
The Fellowship for a Christian Social Order was founded in 1934 in depression-era Kingston, Ontario, and advocated that "the teaching of Jesus Christ, applied in an age of machine production and financial control, mean Christian Socialism". During the 1970s many communities emerged in Quebec modelled on the base ecclesial communities of Latin America.

Canadian reflections on the liberation theme in theology tend to be contributions, usually on specific issues or sub-disciplines such as relating theology and social ethics to economic issues and cultural or racial struggles (rarely on class analysis and struggles despite the rise of a Canadian Social Gospel and its strong influences on the formation of political parties). Representative are Roger Hutchinson, Professor of Religious Studies Emeritus at the Univ of Toronto who co-edited with Cranford Pratt, Christian Faith & Economic Justice: Toward A Canadian Perspective. See also Hutchinson's "Towards 'A Pedagogy for Allies of the Oppressed'", via Catholics for Social Justice at the Scarboro Foreign Mission Society and published in Studies in Religion/Sciences Religieuses 13,2 (Spring 1984): 145–150. (as cited in "Social Ethics in a Post-liberal Age" in Graham Brown, ed., Theological Education in Canada ). There is further Harold Wells' A Long and Faithful March: Towards the Christian Revolution; 1930s/1980s. There are, as well, recently retired Member of Parliament and the United Church of Canada minister, Bill Blaikie and his The Blaikie Report: An Insiders' Look at Faith and Politics (2011) and John Badertcher's recent Ten Steps On Freedom Road: Why the Commandments are Good News (2019). A major 1970s report on many Canadian cities, sparked by the late Stuart Coles and assisted by former Jesuit and Anglican priest Jim Houston, expressed the cries of the oppressed and the challenge to the church is A Dream Not for the Drowsy (albeit out of print).

Exemplary of a personal contribution is Brewster Kneen's 2014 memoir Journey of an Unrepentant Socialist, chronicling his own forays and deepening/widening radicalization into Canadian issues and concluding that socialism can be the only commendable framework of analysis and resolution.

A significant resource for discerning the liberation theme in Canadian works are the writings of those in inner-city or urban ministry. While the "liberation" term may not be readily present intimations abound. Representative are Tim Dickau's Plunging into the Kingdom: Practicing the Shared Strokes of Community, Hospitality, Justice, and Confession (2010) and Barry K. Morris' (co-editor) The Word on the Street:: Invitation to Community Ministry in Canada; Hopeful Realism in Urban Ministry; and a forthcoming A Faithful Public-Prophetic Witness: Pursuits and Pitfalls of "Success" in Canadian City Ministries. Then, there are personal memoirs from street ministries such as Greg Paul's God in the Alley; Jesse Zink's Grace at the Garbage Dump; Tim Huff's Bent Hope: A Street Journal; Al Tysick' preface to Out in the Open: Life on the Street; and not all, the 1970s Norm Ellis' My Parish is Revolting.

Another valued body of writings arises from recent reflections on First Nations' history, especially the challenges to contextualize the consequences of colonization and major inquiries or commissions on the ill effects of residential schools and murdered and missing women. Suggestive of the liberation theme therein are Art Manuel's Unsettling Canada: A National Wake-up Call and Mennonite historian and theologian Steve Heinrichs' Buffalo Shout, Salmon Cry: Conversations on Creation, Land Justice, and Life Together and, not all, Unsettling the Word: Biblical Experiments in Decolonization.

Some Canadian theologians have felt animated but then chastened by the earlier—and perhaps enduring—thrusts of liberation theology especially when it embraced Marxist analysis and even its philosophical and political prescriptions (where a virtual monopoly of the economy by a centralized if not authoritarian political structure was evident if not commended). The emergence of Christian or theological realism was instrumental in this outcome, which seems dominant today—despite occasional Canadian efforts to distinguish "realism" from its USA sources and spokespersons. To an extent, Canadian adoption of community organizing models and actual staff input via the Industrial Areas Foundation illustrate the incorporation of realism combined with liberation themes. Does one wonder if this is the best that can be achieved? However, if the social historian and investigative journalist, par excellent, Naomi Klein, is correct and prophetically apt, then the fierce conflict—and kairos moment—between the climate and capitalism may well provoke revisiting and posing a constructive critique of any constrained political posture that could be deemed normative. The liberation thrust remains active. See thus Klein's This Changes Everything: Capitalism versus The Climate and On Fire: The Burning Case for a Green New Deal (dedicated to the above Arthur Manuel).

Further research could unearth: National denominational staff persons of Canada's once mainstream Christian denominations who have contributed aspects of the liberation theme in their occasional reports and committee work to produce resolutions to their national assemblies (and beyond). They would include the late Robert Lindsey of the United Church of Canada; Don. Brown of the Anglican Church in Canada as well as their late primate Ted Scott; the late RC Bishop of Victoria, BC, Remi De Roo; and doubtlessly, others in the Presbyterian Church; the Mennonite churches; the Baptists; and Religious Society of Friends or Quakers. More research may well uncover book or article titles on these figures and their earnest contributions. Publications have also exhibited liberation themes, many of them sadly defunct - such as the Catholic New Times, Practice of Ministry in Canada, and The Grail—but thankfully Geez: Contemplative Cultural Resistance lives on (with its Manitoba roots).

== See also ==
- Liberation theology
- Religion in Canada
