= Vinay Samuel =

Indian Anglican evangelical theologian (born 1942)

Vinay Kumar Samuel is an Indian Anglican evangelical theologian, known for his work in holistic mission.

== Biography ==
Samuel was born in August 1942 in Hyderabad, India, as the eldest boy of four children. He became a Christian in his teenage years and studied theology at Union Biblical Seminary, Pune, and completed his graduate studies at the University of Cambridge. He was a minister of St. John's Church, Bangalore (1975–1983) and was founding director of the Oxford Centre for Mission Studies (1992–2001 and 2005–2006).

Samuel's theology is largely shaped by his concern for Christian mission within the Indian context. This has underscored an evangelical understanding of holistic mission, which combines evangelism with social concern for the poor, as well as interfaith dialogue.

== Works ==
- Samuel, Vinay; Sugden, Chris, eds. (2009). Mission as Transformation: A Theology of the Whole Gospel. Eugene, OR: Wipf & Stock. ISBN 978-1-60608-402-1.
- Samuel, Vinay; Hauser, Albrecht, eds. (2007). Proclaiming Christ in Christ's Way: Studies in Integral Mission: Essays Presented to Walter Arnold on the Occasion of His 60th Birthday. Eugene, OR: Wipf & Stock. ISBN 978-1-59752-860-3.
- Samuel, Vinay; Sugden, Chris, eds. (2003). The Church in Response to Human Need. Eugene, OR: Wipf & Stock. ISBN 978-1-59244-148-8.
