= Transmodernism =

Philosophical and cultural movement

Transmodernism is a philosophical and cultural movement founded by Argentinian-Mexican philosopher Enrique Dussel. He refers to himself as a transmodernist and wrote a series of essays criticising postmodern theory and advocating a transmodern way of thinking. Transmodernism is a development in thought following the period of postmodernism. As a movement, it was also developed from modernism and critiques modernity and postmodernity, viewing them as the end of modernism.

Transmodernism is influenced by many philosophical movements. Its emphasis on spirituality was influenced by the esoteric movements during the Renaissance. Transmodernism is influenced by transcendentalism and idealises different figures from the mid-19th century United States, most notably Ralph Waldo Emerson. Transmodernism is related to different aspects of Marxist philosophy, having common ground with Roman Catholic liberation theology.

== Philosophies ==
The philosophical views of the transmodernism movement contain elements of both modernism and postmodernism. Transmodernism has been described as "new modernism" and its proponents admire avant-garde styles. It bases much of its core beliefs on the integral theory of Ken Wilber, those of creating a synthesis of "pre-modern", "modern" and "postmodern" realities.

In transmodernism, there is a place for both tradition and modernity, and it seeks as a movement to re-vitalise and modernise tradition rather than destroy or replace it. Unlike modernism or postmodernism, the honouring and reverence of antiquity and traditional lifestyles is important in transmodernism. Transmodernism criticises pessimism, nihilism, relativism and the counter-Enlightenment. It embraces, to a limited extent, optimism, absolutism, foundationalism and universalism. It has an analogical way of thinking, viewing things from the outside rather than the inside.

== Movement ==
As a movement, transmodernism puts an emphasis on spirituality, alternative religions, and transpersonal psychology. Unlike postmodernism, it disagrees with the secularisation of society, putting an emphasis on religion, and it criticises the rejection of worldviews as false or of no importance. Transmodernism places an emphasis on xenophily and globalism, promoting the importance of different cultures and cultural appreciation. It seeks a worldview on cultural affairs and is anti-Eurocentric and anti-imperialist.

Environmentalism, sustainability and ecology are important aspects of the transmodern theory. Transmodernism embraces environmental protection and stresses the importance of neighbourhood life, building communities as well as order and cleanliness. It accepts technological change, yet only when its aim is that of improving life or human conditions. Other aspects of transmodernism include democracy and listening to the poor and suffering.

Transmodernism takes strong stances on feminism, health care, family life and relationships. It promotes the emancipation of women and female rights, alongside several traditional moral and ethical family values; in particular, the importance of family is stressed.

== Leading figures ==
Transmodernism is a minor philosophical movement in comparison to postmodernism and is relatively new to the Northern Hemisphere, but it has a large set of leading figures and philosophers. Enrique Dussel is its founder. Ken Wilber, the inventor of Integral Theory, argues from a transpersonal point of view. Paul Gilroy, a cultural theorist, has also "enthusiastically endorsed" transmodern thinking, and Ziauddin Sardar, an Islamic scholar, is a critic of postmodernism and in many cases adopts a transmodernist way of thinking.

Essays and works arguing from a transmodernist point of view have been published throughout the years.

== See also ==
- Alex Katz
- Criticism of postmodernism
- Neomodernism
- Remodernism
- Transmodernity
