= Paul Gauthier (theologian) =

Catholic priest and theologian

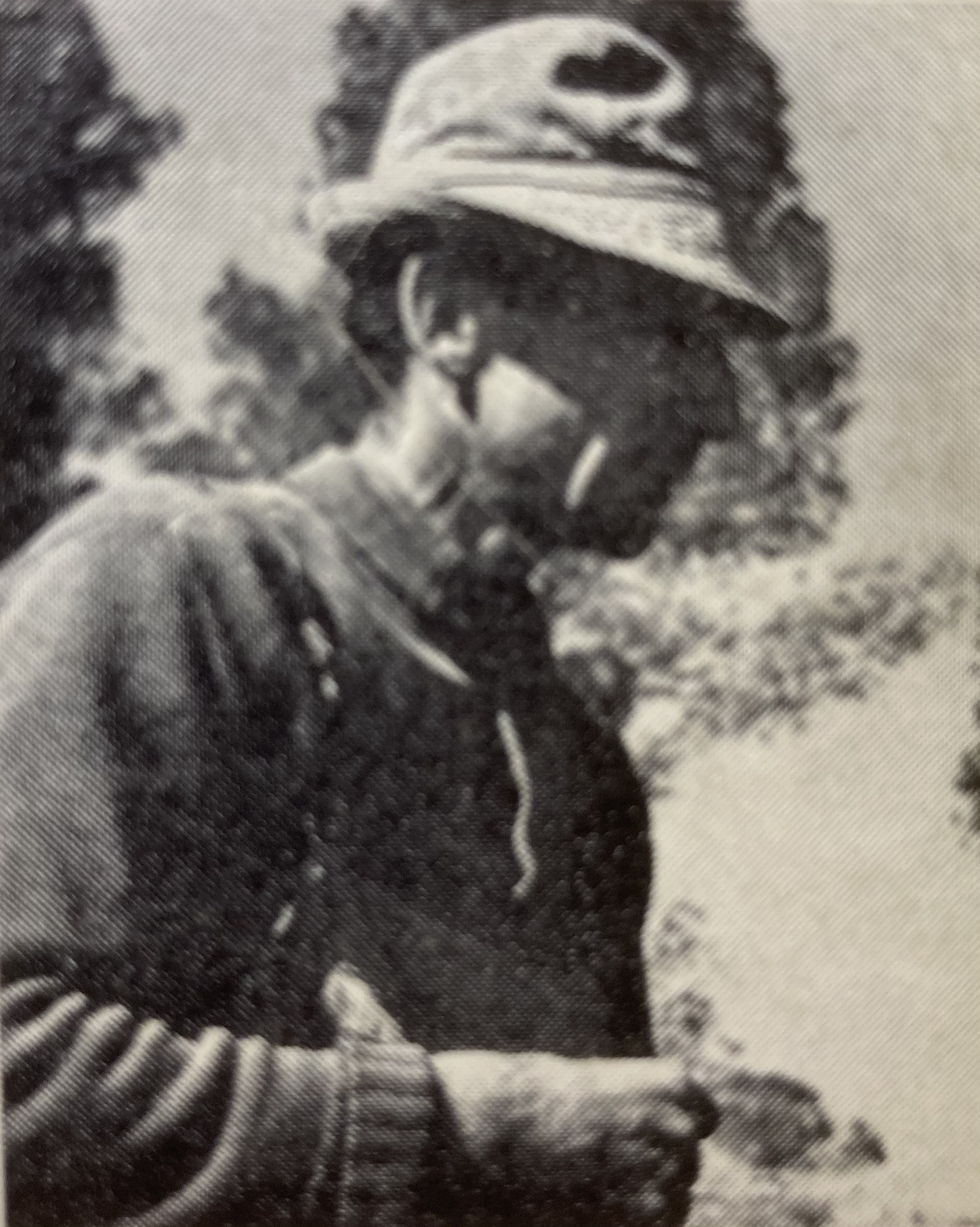
- Church: Roman Catholic church (Latin Church)

Personal details
- Born: 30 August 1914
- Died: 25 December 2002 (aged 88) Marseille

Paul Gauthier (French pronunciation: [pɔl ɡotje]; 30 August 1914 in La Flèche – 25 December 2002 in Marseille) was a Catholic priest, theologian and humanist, known best for his contributions to liberation theology.

== Biography ==
He was born in La Flèche in 1914. At some point he was a professor at a seminary in Dijon. He lived in Nazareth, Palestine, from 1956 to 1967, leaving shortly after the Six Days' War. Gauthier was invited by Georges Hakim, Archbishop of Galilee, to speak to the Second Vatican Council, where he called on the Church to take on a more active role in social justice. While in Palestine, he was part of a group called "Companions of Jesus the Carpenter", providing aid to poverty-stricken people. He died in Marseille in 2002.

One of his students was Enrique Dussel, who claimed that his time with Gauthier "opened [his] mind, [his] spirit, [his] flesh, to a project again unsuspected."

== See also ==
- Liberation theology
- Enrique Dussel

== Bibliography ==
- Jesus, l'église et les pauvres(Jesus, the Church and the Poor) (1963)
