= José Míguez Bonino =

Argentine Methodist theologian

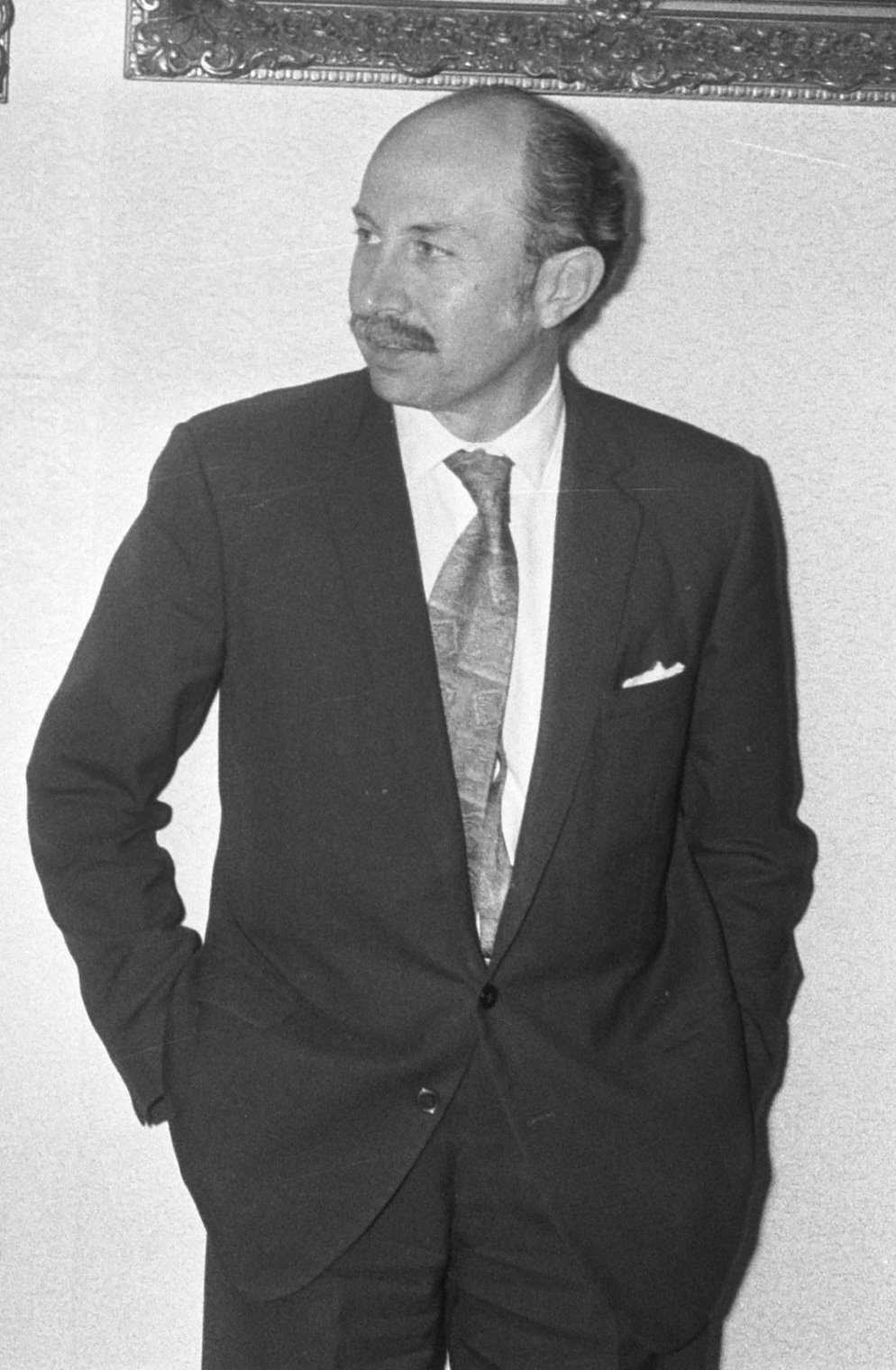
- Born: 5 March 1924
- Died: 1 July 2012 (aged 88)

José Míguez Bonino (Rosario, Santa Fe, 5 March 1924 – Tandil, 1 July 2012) was an Argentine Methodist theologian.

== Biography ==
Bonino was raised in the Methodist Church, and participated actively in this denomination since his youth. He studied theology at a university in Buenos Aires between 1943 and 1948. He worked in church ministries in Bolivia, and after obtaining his degree he was a pastor in Mendoza. Bonino traveled to the United States to pursue a master's degree at the Candler School of Theology in Atlanta. In 1954, he became a professor of dogmatic theology in Buenos Aires. In 1958, he left teaching to pursue further study at Union Theological Seminary in New York, where he obtained his doctorate in 1960 with a thesis on ecumenism.

Bonino was appointed Director of the Evangelical Faculty of Theology in 1961, joining the Lutheran Faculty of Theology to form what is now the Evangelical Institute for Higher Theological Studies (ISEDET), where he served as director of postgraduate studies. Meanwhile, he was also senior pastor of the Methodist Church of Buenos Aires. During the Second Vatican Council he was the only Latin American Protestant observer.

Between 1961 and 1977, he was a member of the Faith and Order Commission of the World Council of Churches (WCC), and from 1975 to 1983 he was one of the members of the WCC Presidency. He was also executive secretary of the South American Association of Theological Institutions between 1970 and 1976. In 1994, despite not having party affiliation, he was elected to the Constitutional Assembly that carried out the 1994 amendment of the Constitution of Argentina, in which he participated especially in social and human rights issues.

== Theology ==
Bonino was very influenced by the ideas of the social gospel. He criticized the social gospel for its theological weakness and utopian idealism that held that the kingdom of God is brewing in human history. He sought to link the biblical theological conception of the Gospel with social concern in the cultural sphere. The theology of Karl Barth was also significant in the development of his thought.

Bonino is considered one of the founders of Latin American liberation theology, and he was committed to a political ethic focused on the poor and the defense of human rights. He described liberation theology as "the response of a generation of young Catholics and evangelicals to the call of the Holy Spirit for a renewed spiritual, ethical and social commitment to the poor, the call for a new and integral evangelization."

He has advocated for community interpretation of the Bible against individualism.

== Books ==
- What does it mean to be a church of Christ here today?. Methopress. 1966.
- Open Council: a Protestant interpretation of the Second Vatican Council. Editorial La Aurora. 1967.
- Human integration and Christian unity. Evangelical Seminary of Puerto Rico. 1969.
- Criticism of violence in Latin America. Latin American Board of Church and Society (ISAL). 1971.
- Love and do what you want: towards a new man's ethic. Editorial Escatón. 1972.
- People oppressed, lord of history. Tierra Nueva. 1972.
- Space to be men: an interpretation of the Bible for our world. Tierra Nueva. 1975.
- Christians and Marxists: The mutual challenge for revolution. Grand Rapids: Eerdmans. 1975.
- Jesus: neither defeated nor celestial monarch. Tierra Nueva. 1977.
- Faith in search of efficacy: an interpretation of Latin American theological reflection on liberation. Editions Follow me. 1977.
- Puebla and Oaxtepec: a Protestant and Catholic critic. Tierra Nueva. 1980.
- Toward a Christian Political Ethics. Philadelphia: Fortress Press. 1982. ISBN 9780800616977.
- Liberation Theology. Editorial Caribe. 1986.
- with Míguez, Néstor Oscar (1990). So that they have life: meetings with Jesus in the Gospel of John. General Meeting of Global Ministries, United Methodist Church.
- The Dictionary of the Ecumenical Movement. World Council of Churches; Grand Rapids: Eerdmans. 1991.
- Conflict and unity in the church. Sebila. 1992.
- Power of the gospel and political power: the participation of evangelicals in political life in Latin America. Kairós Editions. 1994.
- Faces of Latin American Protestantism. Grand Rapids: Eerdmans. 1995.
