= Orlando Costas =

Hispanic Evangelical theologian and missiologist (1942–1987)

Orlando Enrique Costas
- Born: June 15, 1942; Ponce, Puerto Rico
- Died: November 5, 1987 (aged 45); Newton Centre, Massachusetts
- Education: Missionary College of Nyack; Garrett Evangelical Theological Seminary (M.Div., 1969); Free University of Amsterdam (Ph.D., 1976)
- Occupation: Evangelical theologian · Missiologist · Educator · Pastor
- Years active: 1965–1987
- Organizations: Seminario Bíblico Latinoamericano; Eastern Baptist Theological Seminary; Andover Newton Theological School; Latin American Theological Fellowship; Lausanne Movement
- Known for: Pioneer of holistic/contextual mission theology; leader in Latin American Theological Fellowship; advocate for integrating evangelism & social justice
- Notable work: The Integrity of Mission (1979); Christ Outside the Gate (1982); Liberating News (1989, posthumous)
- Spouse: Rosa Lydia Feliciano Costas (m. 1962)
- Children: Two

Orlando Enrique Costas (15 June 1942 – 5 November 1987) was a Hispanic evangelical theologian and missiologist.

== Early life and education ==
Costas was born in Ponce, Puerto Rico to Methodist parents, Ventura Enrique Costas and Rosaline Rivera, on June 14, 1942. He moved with his father to the United States, living first in the Bronx and then Bridgeport, CT. He finished his high school years at Bob Jones Academy and studied at the Missionary College of Nyack in New York.

== Career and ministry ==
Costas returned to Puerto Rico in 1965, where he was ordained in the American Baptist Churches of Puerto Rico, pastored a local church, and studied at the Interamerican University. He returned to the United States in 1966, where he pastored and studied at Trinity Evangelical Divinity School, Wheaton College, completed a master's degree at Winona Lake School of Theology, and, in 1969, completed an M.Div. at the Garrett–Evangelical Theological Seminary.

From 1970 to 1976, Orlando Costas served in San José, Costa Rica with the Latin American Mission, holding multiple academic and administrative roles at the Seminario Bíblico Latinoamericano (SBL) and the Institute for In Depth Evangelism. He also directed CELEP and published multiple books on topics such as evangelism, church growth, and Latin American missiology. During this period, he was a visiting professor at Gordon-Conwell Theological Seminary and completed his doctorate in theology at the Free University of Amsterdam in 1976.

From 1977 to 1980, he worked as a missionary with the United Church of Christ, edited theological publications, and contributed to Latin American church history scholarship. He also published The Integrity of Mission in 1979, emphasizing the unity of evangelism and discipleship.

In 1980, he became the Thornley B. Wood Professor of Missiology and director of Hispanic Studies at Eastern Baptist Theological Seminary, where he created a program for non-degree ministry students. His final role began in 1984 as academic dean and Adoniram Judson Chair of Missiology at Andover Newton Theological School, where he advanced theological education for minority communities. His work led to the creation of the Orlando E. Costas Hispanic and Latin American Ministries Program.

== Impact and legacy ==
Costas became a major figure in the Latin American Theological Fellowship and the Lausanne movement, advocating for a holistic mission which brought together evangelism with social activism. During his lifetime he published dozens of books, book chapters, and journal articles on a variety of topics related to theology and missiology.

Since 1990, the Boston Theological Institute (a consortium of nine theological schools in the Greater Boston area) has honored Costas’ legacy by hosting the annual Costas Consultation on Global Mission focused on a specific mission-related theme.

In 2007, a festschrift was published in his honor entitled Antioch Agenda: Essays on the Restorative Church in Honor of Orlando E. Costas. Costas continues to hold relevance for many contemporary theologians well beyond his death.

== Personal life and death ==
Costas married Rosa Lydia Feliciano in December 1962, and they had two daughters, Annette (born 1963) and Dannette (born 1967). He died of stomach cancer in his home in Newton Centre, MA on 5 November 1987.

== Works ==
- Costas, Orlando E. (1989). Liberating news: A theology of contextual evangelization. Grand Rapids: Eerdmans.
- Costas, Orlando E. (1982). Christ outside the gate: Mission beyond Christendom. Grand Rapids: Eerdmans.
- Costas, Orlando E. (1979). The integrity of mission: The inner life and outreach of the church. San Francisco: Harper and Row.
- Costas, Orlando E. (1976). Theology of the crossroads in contemporary Latin America. Amsterdam: Editions Rodopi.
- Costas, Orlando E. (1974). The church and its mission: A shattering critique from the third world. Wheaton: Tyndale House Publishers.
