= Rosa María Rodríguez Magda =

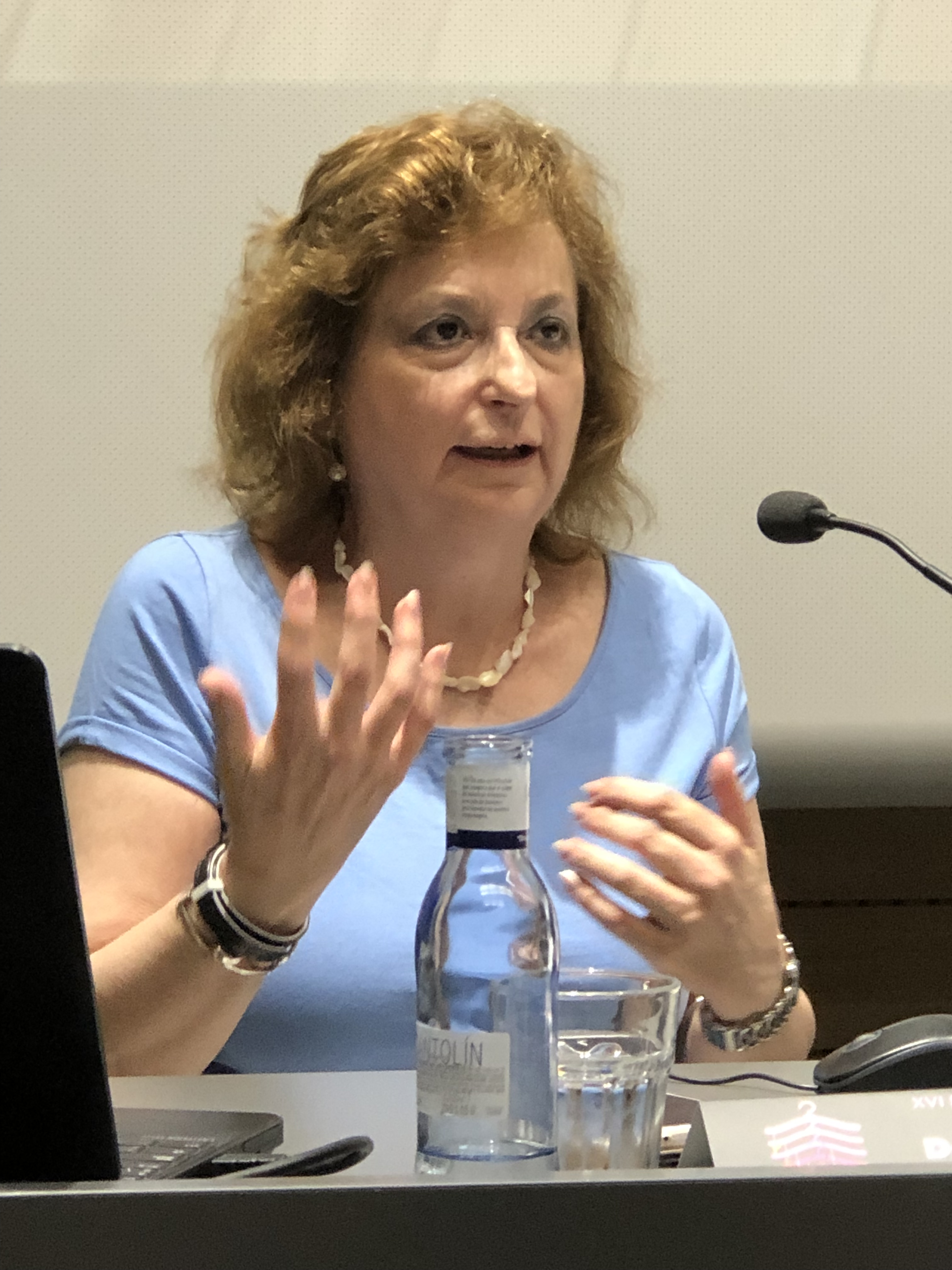
- Born: 15 October 1957 (age 69); Valencia, Spain

Philosophical work
- Era: 20th-century philosophy
- Region: Western philosophy

Rosa María Rodríguez Magda is a Spanish philosopher and writer. In 1989, she introduced the concept of transmodernity, on which she continues writing, presenting and expanding.
