= Latin American Theological Fellowship =

The Latin American Theological Fellowship (Spanish: Fraternidad Teológica Latinoamericana or FTL) is an interdenominational Latin American organization which has emphasized the collaborative theological work of Latin American evangelicals.

== Early history ==
In response to the developments of more liberal Christian groups in Latin American and through the World Council of Churches, the Billy Graham Evangelistic Association initiated in 1969 the First Latin American Congress for Evangelization (Spanish: Congreso Latinoamericano de Evangelización or CLADE I). However, according to the Ecuadorian theologian C. René Padilla, CLADE I was "made in the USA" and had very little Latin American contribution.

The following year, in 1970, Peter Savage, C. René Padilla, Samuel Escobar, and a number of others met just outside Cochabamba, Bolivia to discuss the formation of the new group: the Fraternidad Teológica Latinoamericana. The meeting was not without its controversies, including Padilla challenging whether the "North American" preoccupation with Biblical inerrancy was correct or needed for the establishment of the Latin American group. It was ultimately omitted from the founding "declaration" of this group.

It was through the FTL that the notion of "misión integral" (often translated as holistic or integral mission) was spread, first throughout Latin American evangelicalism, then later through global evangelicalism by way of Lausanne 1974. It was a notion that was developed by René Padilla in the 1950s, which emphasized the gospel as needing to uphold both evangelism and social responsibility, and is seen as an evangelical form of Latin American liberation theology.

== Today ==
The FTL has groups throughout most countries of Latin America, known as "núcleos," which promote its understanding of theology and mission.

== See also ==
- Integral mission
- René Padilla
- Ruth Padilla DeBorst
