= Jamie Turndorf =

American psychotherapist (born 1958)

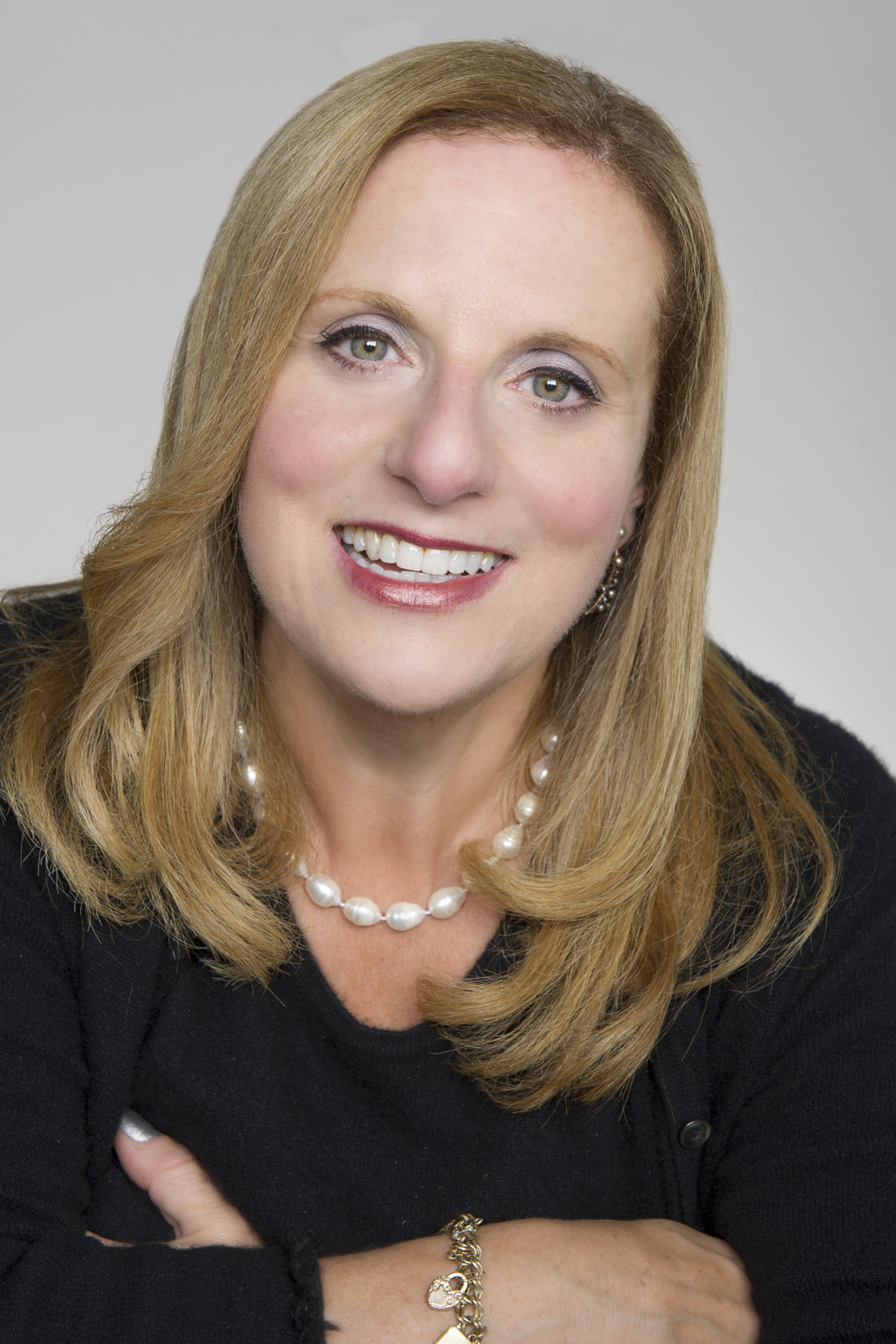
- Born: Jamie Turndorf; July 12, 1958 (age 68); Boston, Massachusetts, U.S.
- Education: Vassar College (AB); Adelphi University School of Social Work (M.S.W.); California Coast University (Ph.D.)
- Occupations: Psychotherapist; author; advice columnist
- Partner: Emile Jean Pin (1979–2006)
- Website: AskDrLove.com

Jamie Turndorf (born July 12, 1958) is an American psychotherapist, writer and media personality.

She is known for her website, AskDrLove.com, which she founded in 1995, her syndicated radio show, Ask Dr. Love, and her books Till Death Do Us Part (Unless I Kill You First) and Love Never Dies. She also hosts a radio show, Love Never Dies, on the Hay House radio website.

Turndorf created her website, AskDrLove.com, in 1995, and has been known to fans as "Dr Love" ever since. On the site, registered members can submit questions for consideration to be answered by Turndorf and published on the site for the benefit of the public. The site has accumulated a store of original articles addressing a broad array of relationship, marriage, dating, and sex advice issues. The site was noted with awards from Starting Point and Web Crawler, and in 1999, was listed in IDG's Complete Idiot's Guide to Online Dating and Relating.

As a guest expert, Turndorf has appeared on numerous radio and television shows. She is the "Resident Love Doctor" of HLN Weekend Express with Natasha Curry. Her advice columns have also been featured on HLN and iVillage.com. She has been quoted on WebMD.com, Fox Five Online, MSNBC.com, eRelationshipAdviceCafe, MSN Living and Discovery TV's websites. She also writes a relationship column, "We Can Work It Out", for Psychology Today online.

== Bibliography ==
- Love Never Dies: How to Reconnect and Make Peace with the Deceased
- Kiss Your Fights Good-bye: Dr. Love's 10 Simple Steps to Cooling Conflict and Rekindling Your Relationship
- Till Death Do us Part (Unless I Kill You First): A Step-by-Step Guide to Resolving Relationship Conflict
- Make Up Don't Break Up: Dr. Love's Five Step Plan for Reconciling with Your Ex
- The Pleasure of Your Company: A Socio-Psychological Analysis of Modern Sociability, (with Emile Jean Pin)
- LoveQuest: The Game of Finding Mr. Right. This game was nominated by Mensa as the "Most Creative and Intellectually Challenging Game of the Year" and voted by Fun and Games magazine as a sure winner for the international "Most Creative Game of the Year" award. The New York City Board of Education has a permanent exhibit of LoveQuest.
- Foreword to The Complete Idiot's Guide to Affair Proof Love
