= René Padilla =

Ecuadorian evangelical theologian (1932–2021)

C. René Padilla
- Born: 12 October 1932; Quito, Ecuador
- Died: 27 April 2021 (aged 88)
- Occupations: Theologian and missiologist
- Known for: Integral mission
- Spouses: Catharine Feser Padilla (d. 2009); Beatriz Vásquez

Academic background
- Education: Wheaton College; University of Manchester
- Doctoral advisor: F. F. Bruce

Academic work
- Discipline: New Testament

Carlos René Padilla (12 October 1932 – 27 April 2021) was an Ecuadorian evangelical theologian and missiologist known for coining the term integral mission (Spanish: misión integral) in the 1970s to articulate Christianity's dual priority in evangelism and social activism. He popularized this term in Latin American evangelicalism through the Latin American Theological Fellowship and through the global evangelical Lausanne Conference of 1974.

== Early life and education ==
Padilla was born into a poor family in Quito, Ecuador, in 1932. Due to the Great Depression, his family moved when he was two years old to Colombia, where he would grow up. He later pursued a BA in philosophy and a MA in theology at Wheaton College, before completing a PhD in the New Testament from the University of Manchester, under F. F. Bruce.

== Career ==
His education and experiences with InterVarsity Christian Fellowship underscored Padilla's evangelical foundations and the priority he placed on the historical-critical approach to hermeneutics. However, in 1959, Padilla was appointed a traveling secretary in Latin America for International Fellowship of Evangelical Students. In his work with universities throughout Venezuela, Colombia, Peru, and Ecuador, Padilla was faced with a tense sociopolitical context. Students were immersed in Marxist writings and grappled with the possibility of revolution. This was the context which produced not only Catholic liberation theology, but also challenged Padilla to develop a new evangelical social theology which he later termed "integral mission."

Padilla brought his ideas to the global stage at the Lausanne Conference of 1974. This had a significant effect on the nature of global evangelicalism and the growing priority of evangelicals in both evangelism and social activism.

Padilla received an honorary Doctor of Divinity degree from Wheaton College in 1992. He became International President of Tearfund in 1996, with UK President Elaine Storkey.

== Personal life and death ==
Padilla was married to Catharine Feser, who died in 2009, and later to Beatriz Vasquez. He had five children including the theologian Ruth Padilla DeBorst. Padilla died on April 27, 2021, at the age of 88.

== Works ==
- Padilla, C. René (2010). Mission Between the Times: Essays on the Kingdom (rev. ed.). Carlisle: Langham Monographs. ISBN 978-1-907713-01-9.
