= Liberation theology =

Christian theological approach

Liberation theology is a Christian theological approach emphasizing the liberation of the oppressed. The term originated among Latin American Catholic theologians in the 1960s, and it has increasingly been used to describe similar approaches in other parts of the globe. It often engages in socio-economic analyses, and emphasizes social concern for those marginalized due to their social class, race, ethnicity, gender, etc.

== History ==
Liberation theologies were first being discussed in the Latin American context, especially within Catholicism in the 1960s after the Second Vatican Council. There, it became the political praxis of theologians such as Frei Betto, Gustavo Gutiérrez, Leonardo Boff, and Jesuits Juan Luis Segundo and Jon Sobrino, who popularized the phrase "preferential option for the poor".

The option for the poor is simply the idea that, as reflected in canon law, "The Christian faithful are also obliged to promote social justice and, mindful of the precept of the Lord, to assist the poor." It indicates an obligation, on the part of those who would call themselves Christian, first and foremost to care for the poor and vulnerable.

Its roots can be traced to precursors like Catholic Action and the influence of the Second Vatican Council, which inspired new approaches to addressing systemic poverty and inequality in Latin America. While its theological framework centers on interpreting the Gospel through the lens of the oppressed, liberation theology also drew from broader socialist and anti-imperialist movements.

Latin America also produced Protestant advocates of liberation theology, such as Rubem Alves, José Míguez Bonino, and C. René Padilla, who in the 1970s called for integral mission, emphasizing evangelism and social responsibility.

The movement's theoretical foundations draws heavily from Marxist social analysis, particularly its critique of structural inequality and class oppression. While liberation theology does not adopt Marxism wholesale, its use of concepts like class struggle and the critique of global capitalism has led to significant controversy within the Church. Pope John Paul II and the Vatican’s Congregation for the Doctrine of the Faith, led by Cardinal Joseph Ratzinger (later Pope Benedict XVI), criticized the movement for what they perceived as excessive politicization and alignment with communist ideologies.

Despite this opposition, liberation theology influences political and social movements across Latin America. It was a driving force in the rise of grassroots ecclesial communities (Spanish: comunidades eclesiales de base), which mobilizes marginalized populations to advocate for land reform, labor rights, and democratic governance. These communities often serve as spaces for political consciousness-raising, blending religious practices with calls for systemic change. Liberation theology has been particularly influential in countries like El Salvador, where figures such as Archbishop Óscar Romero became symbols of resistance against military regimes and human rights abuses.

Theologies of liberation have also developed in other parts of the world such as black theology in the United States and South Africa, Palestinian liberation theology, Dalit theology in India, Minjung theology in South Korea, as well as liberation theology in Ireland.

In South Africa, the movement's principles resonated with Christian opposition to apartheid, providing a theological framework for resistance against racial oppression. The writings of theologians like Allan Boesak and Desmond Tutu show how liberation theology shaped anti-apartheid activism, emphasizing themes of reconciliation, justice, and the moral imperative to dismantle systemic racism. Similarly, liberationist ideas influenced Islamic thought, notably through figures like Ali Shari'ati in Iran, who adapted these principles to critique Western imperialism and promote economic justice within a Shi’a framework.

While its prominence has waned since its height in the 1970s and 1980s, liberation theology continues to influence contemporary theological and social movements. In the context of globalization, its critique of neoliberal policies and emphasis on solidarity among oppressed groups remain relevant. Pope Francis, the first Latin American pope, drew from liberationist ideas, particularly in his advocacy for economic justice and environmental stewardship, as seen in his encyclical Laudato Si’. This development signaled a renewed engagement with the movement’s principles within the institutional Church.

Liberation theology's legacy also includes its impact on academic discourse, where it has fostered interdisciplinary approaches to theology, sociology, and political science. Scholars have analyzed its role in decolonizing knowledge and creating counter-hegemonic narratives, particularly within the Global South. This scholarship highlights the movement’s enduring relevance in addressing systemic inequality and advocating for transformative social change.

Despite its contributions, liberation theology has faced significant criticism. Some within the Catholic Church questioned its alignment with Marxist ideologies, particularly its use of class analysis and its perceived politicization of theology. Others argue that its political activism blurred the boundaries between religion and politics, raising concerns about the church's role in revolutionary movements. Nevertheless, it has left a lasting legacy, inspiring contemporary movements that challenge systemic injustice. Its influence extends to ongoing critiques of global capitalism, solidarity efforts across the Global South, and theological reimaginings that prioritize the voices of the oppressed. As a movement that bridges faith and activism, liberation theology continues to serve as a powerful call to action for those seeking to reconcile spirituality with the fight for a more equitable world. Today, liberation theology’s legacy endures in contemporary critiques of global capitalism and as a source of inspiration for ongoing struggles for justice.

=== Latin America ===
Liberation theology developed within the Catholic Church in Latin America in the 1960s, as a reaction to the poverty and social injustice in the region, which CEPAL deemed the most unequal in the world. The term was coined in 1971 by the Peruvian priest Gustavo Gutiérrez, who wrote one of the movement's defining books, A Theology of Liberation. Other exponents include Leonardo Boff of Brazil, and Jesuits Jon Sobrino of El Salvador and Juan Luis Segundo of Uruguay.

Latin American liberation theology influenced parts of the evangelical movement and Catholic bishops in the United States. Its reliance on "Marxism" led in the mid-1980s to an admonition by the Vatican's Congregation for the Doctrine of the Faith (CDF). While stating that "in itself, the expression 'theology of liberation' is a thoroughly valid term", the prefect Cardinal Ratzinger rejected certain forms of Latin American liberation theology for focusing on institutionalized or systemic sin and for identifying Catholic Church hierarchy in South America as members of the same privileged class that had long been oppressing Indigenous populations from the arrival of Pizarro onward.

=== Black communities ===
More or less at the same time as the initial publications of Latin American liberation theology are also found voices of Black liberation theology and Womanist theology (see also feminist liberation theology). Black theology refers to a theological perspective which originated in some black churches in the United States and later in other parts of the world, which contextualizes Christianity in an attempt to help those of African descent overcome oppression. It especially focuses on the injustices committed against African Americans and black South Africans during American segregation and apartheid, respectively.

Black theology seeks to liberate people of colour from multiple forms of political, social, economic, and religious subjugation and views Christian theology as a theology of liberation—"a rational study of the being of God in the world in light of the existential situation of an oppressed community, relating the forces of liberation to the essence of the Gospel, which is Jesus Christ," writes James Hal Cone, one of the original advocates of the perspective. Black theology mixes Christianity with questions of civil rights, particularly as raised by the Black Power movement and the Black Consciousness Movement.

=== Dalits ===
Dalit theology is a branch of Christian theology that emerged among the Dalit castes in the Indian subcontinent in the 1980s. It shares a number of themes with Latin American liberation theology, which arose two decades earlier, including a self-identity as a people undergoing Exodus. Dalit theology sees hope in the "Nazareth Manifesto" of Luke 4, where Jesus speaks of preaching "good news to the poor ... freedom for the prisoners and recovery of sight for the blind" and of releasing "the oppressed".

=== Palestinians ===
Palestinian liberation theology is an expression of political theology and a contextual theology that represents an attempt by a number of independently working Palestinian Christian theologians from various denominations—mostly Protestant mainline churches—to articulate the gospel message in such a way as to make that liberating gospel relevant to the perceived needs of their Indigenous flocks. As a rule, this articulation involves a theological underpinning of Palestinian resistance to Israel as well as Palestinian national aspirations, and an intense valorization of Palestinian ethnic and cultural identity as guarantors of a truer grasp of the gospel by virtue of the fact that they are inhabitants of the land of Jesus and the Bible. One of the principal figures in Palestinian liberation theology is the Anglican cleric Naim Ateek, founder of the Sabeel Ecumenical Liberation Theology Center in Jerusalem. Another key Palestinian theologian, who mostly wrote in Arabic, is Catholic priest Father Rafiq Khoury. Palestinian theology is very ecumenical, with contributors from various churches.

=== Northern Ireland ===
In Ireland, liberation theology has been associated with the ideas and praxis of the Belfast Roman Catholic priest Des Wilson. Following the onset of the Northern Ireland Troubles, Wilson defended the right of communities systematically failed by the state, the churches and other institutions to create "alternative education, alternative welfare, alternative theatre, broadcasting, theological and political discussion, public inquiries and much else". More controversially, citing the example of Brazilian archbishop Hélder Câmara, he argued that this right extended to "alternative police and alternative armies".

During the military dictatorship in Brazil, Câmara, who called on clergy to engage in the struggle for justice without fear of identification with the revolutionary left ("When I give food to the poor, they call me a saint. When I ask why they are poor, they call me a communist"), refused to condemn armed resistance. In a famous interview with Italian journalist Oriana Fallaci, he explained that while it was not his choice ("not my road, not my way to apply the Gospels"), he would never say "to use weapons against an oppressor is immoral or anti-Christian".

Wilson argued that a church, not itself pacifist (as a schoolchild he recalls being taught to revere General Franco as a soldier of Christ), needed to develop a new "theology of pacifism". Acknowledging the predicament of those who had "a duty to protect others—their families their homes", this would need to do more than satisfy the needs of "an oppressive government or of people seeking undemanding respectability".

=== Deaf people ===
Deaf liberation theology is a product of Deaf culture and a resistance to audism in mainstream hearing theological spaces. Deaf people often face exclusion in spaces of worship due to their status as a linguistic minority. The foundation of Deaf theology rests upon the Claggett Statement.

=== Peace movement ===
The Christian peace movement has been associated with liberation theology in many ways. Participating theologians have been in all continents and countries, including countries with Christian minorities. A central theme has been peace as a way of redemption and liberation.

== See also ==
- Jean-Bertrand Aristide
- Catholic Worker Movement
- Christian communism
- Catholic communism
- Camilo Torres Restrepo
- Christian libertarianism
- Dorothy Day
- Emancipation
- Liberalization
- Liberation theology in Canada
- Liberation psychology
- Paul Farmer
- Peter Maurin
- Movement of Priests for the Third World in Argentina
- Émile Pin
- Reconciliation theology
- Tucum ring
- Religious anarchism (Buddhist, Christian, Islamic, Jewish)
- Religious socialism (Buddhist, Christian, Islamic, Jewish)
- Religious views on capitalism
- Transmodernism
