= Samuel Escobar =

Peruvian theologian (1934–2025)

- Born: Juan Samuel Escobar Aguirre; November 28, 1934; Arequipa, Peru
- Died: April 29, 2025 (aged 90); Valencia, Spain
- Education: National University of San Marcos (Pedagogy, 1957); Complutense University of Madrid (PhD, 1966)
- Occupations: Theologian; missiologist; educator; author
- Years active: 1959–2025
- Known for: Founding the Latin American Theological Fellowship; pioneer of integral mission; leader of the Lausanne Movement and IFES
- Notable work: In Search of Christ in Latin America (2019); The New Global Mission (2003); Time for Mission (1999); People in Mission (2021)
- Spouses: Lily Artola (m. 1958; died 2015)
- Children: 2
- Awards: Honorary President, IFES; President, United Bible Societies (1996–2004); President, American Society of Missiology (2002)

Juan Samuel Escobar Aguirre (Note: Spanish pronunciation: [ˈxwan saˈmwel escoˈβaɾ aˈɣire].) (28 November 1934 – 29 April 2025) was a Peruvian evangelical theologian, missiologist, educator, and author. He co-founded the Latin American Theological Fellowship and wrote extensively on mission, Latin American theology, and the relationship between evangelism and social responsibility.

== Early life and education ==
Escobar was born on 28 November 1934 in Arequipa, Peru. He was raised in the Evangelical Church of Peru.

In 1951, he began his studies of Arts and Education at the National University of San Marcos in Lima. That year, he was baptized by M. David Oates, a Southern Baptist missionary from the United States. While there, he encountered Marxist and existentialist thought. He was also influenced by the theology and practice of evangelical revivalism. In 1957, Escobar graduated with a degree in pedagogy. Nine years later, Escobar moved to Spain and earned his doctorate cum laude at the Complutense University of Madrid.

== Career ==
Escobar joined the International Fellowship of Evangelical Students (IFES) in 1959, with which he worked in Peru, Argentina, Brazil, and Spain. From 1972 to 1975, he worked as General Director of InterVarsity Christian Fellowship in Canada. He returned to Latin America to continue his work with IFES and build indigenous theological networks.

In 1970, following the first Congreso Latinoamericano de Evangelización (CLADE I) in Bogotá, Escobar co-founded the Fraternidad Teológica Latinoamericana (FTL), serving as its president until 1984. The FTL brought together Latin American evangelical theologians and promoted theological work developed within the region.

From 1985 to 2005, Escobar was Thornley B. Wood Professor of Missiology at Eastern Baptist Theological Seminary (now Palmer Theological Seminary) in the U.S. state of Pennsylvania. He was also adjunct professor at Eastern University and later a consultant on theological education for the American Baptist Churches USA.

== Personal life and death ==
Escobar married Lily Artola in 1958, and they had two children together. He was widowered on 26 February 2015. He died in Valencia, Spain on 29 April 2025, at the age of 90.

== International influence ==
Escobar participated in several international evangelical congresses, including:

- Berlin Congress on Evangelism (1966)
- CLADE I (Bogotá, 1969)
- Lausanne Congress on World Evangelization (1974)
- Lausanne II (Manila, 1989)
- CLADE III (Quito, 1992)
- Lausanne III (Cape Town, 2010), where he chaired the advisory council

At Lausanne 1974, Escobar criticized North American evangelicalism for prioritizing personal salvation over structural justice. He urged evangelicals to pursue "holistic mission" by addressing social, political, and economic realities.

== Theological views ==
Escobar argued that Christian mission should include both evangelism and social responsibility. He criticized forms of missionary work that treated Latin American churches as dependent on North American or European leadership and advocated the development of theology and church leadership within Latin America.

== Honors and later career ==
Escobar was ordained as a Baptist minister in 1979. He served as President of the International Fellowship of Evangelical Students from 1995 to 2003 and President of the United Bible Societies from 1996 to 2004.

He was professor emeritus at Palmer Theological Seminary and a contributing editor to the International Bulletin of Mission Research.

In 2019 Escobar received the American Society of Missiology Lifetime Achievement Award.

Escobar's papers are housed and preserved at the Wheaton College Archives and Special Collections.

== Selected works ==
Escobar authored more than twenty books, including:

- La Fe Evangélica Y Las Teologías De La Liberación (1987) ISBN 9780311091072
- Paulo Freire: Una Pedagogia Latinoamericana (1993) ISBN 9789687011325
- Servir Con Los Pobres En América Latina: Modelos de Ministerio Integral (1997) ISBN 9789879591529
- Un pueblo en tiempo de misión (1999) ISBN 9786124252969
- Changing Tides: Mission in Latin America (2002) ISBN 9781570754142
- The New Global Mission: The Gospel from Everywhere to Everyone (2003) ISBN 9780830877836
- La Palabra: vida de la iglesia (2006) ISBN 9780311421206
- In Search of Christ in Latin America: From Colonial Image to Liberating Savior (2019) ISBN 9780830889914
- People in Mission: An Autobiographical Reflection (2021) ISBN 9781506484006
- Samuel Escobar: An Anthology: Collected Essays on Mission, Culture and Theology (2022) ISBN 9781506488981
- Un pueblo en tiempo de misión (2022) ISBN 9786124252969

== See also ==
- Latin American Theological Fellowship
- Lausanne Movement
