= A Theology of Liberation =

1971 book by Gustavo Gutiérrez

- Author: Gustavo Gutiérrez
- Original title: Teología de la liberación
- Language: Spanish
- Subject: Theology
- Publisher: Centro de Estudios y Publicaciones
- Publication date: 1971
- Publication place: Peru
- English publication date: 1973

A Theology of Liberation (Spanish: Teología de la liberación: Perspectivas) is a 1971 book by the Peruvian Roman Catholic theologian Gustavo Gutiérrez. The book was foundational to the development of liberation theology, a term coined by Gutiérrez in his 1968 lecture "Hacia una teología de la liberación" ('Towards a theology of liberation').

Originally published in Spanish, the work has been translated into nine languages as of 1989. The first English translation was made by Caridad Inda and John Eagleson. The translation sold over 50,000 copies in the twenty months following its publication in 1973.
