= Enrique Dussel =

Argentine philosopher (1934–2023)

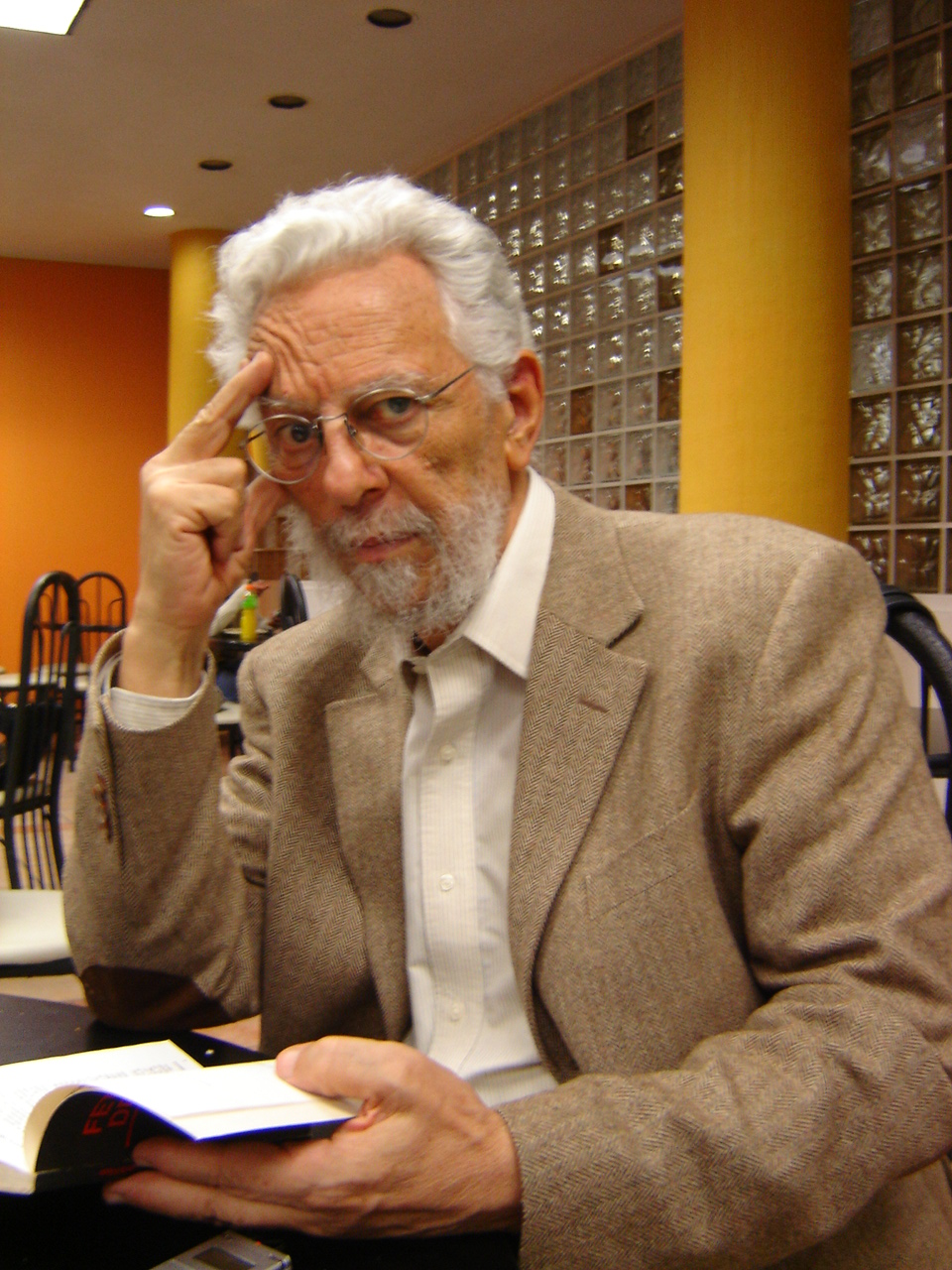
- Dussel in 2009
- Born: Enrique Domingo Dussel; 24 December 1934; La Paz, Mendoza, Argentina
- Died: 5 November 2023 (aged 88); Mexico City, Mexico
- Spouse: Johanna Peters

Education
- Education: Universidad Nacional de Cuyo; Complutense University of Madrid; Institut Catholique de Paris; La Sorbonne

Philosophical work
- Era: 20th-century philosophy
- Region: Western philosophy
- School: Continental philosophy, theology of liberation, Marxism
- Institutions: Universidad Autónoma Metropolitana; National Autonomous University of Mexico
- Main interests: Philosophy of liberation, ethics, political economy, theology, history
- Notable ideas: Transmodernism

Enrique Domingo Dussel Ambrosini (24 December 1934 – 5 November 2023) was an Argentine-Mexican academic, philosopher, historian and theologian. He served as the interim rector of the Universidad Autónoma de la Ciudad de México from 2013 to 2014.

== Life and career ==
Enrique Dussel was born on 24 December 1934 in La Paz, Mendoza. He studied at the Universidad Nacional de Cuyo in Mendoza from 1953 to 1957, receiving an undergraduate degree in philosophy, after which he travelled to Europe to continue his studies. He then received a doctorate from the Complutense University of Madrid, a doctorate in history from the Sorbonne in Paris, and an undergraduate degree in theology obtained through studies in Paris and Münster. Between 1959 and 1961 he lived in Israel learning Arabic and Hebrew and working manual jobs at a cooperative led by French Jesuit Paul Gauthier, who would go on to influence Dussel and his view of liberation theology. He returned to Argentina in 1969 and became influenced by dependency theory and the writings of Emmanuel Levinas, both of which were to become major influences on his thinking. In the events leading up to the military dictatorship in Argentina of 1976–1983, he was increasingly the target of violence, including death threats, the bombing of his house, and sacking from the university. He escaped to Mexico in 1975 as a political exile, where he continued his work as a professor of philosophy at the Iztapalapa campus of the Universidad Autónoma Metropolitana (Autonomous Metropolitan University, UAM) and in a teaching position at the Universidad Nacional Autónoma de México (National Autonomous University of Mexico, UNAM).

Dussel received an honorary doctorate from the University of Fribourg in 1981, the University of San Andrés in 1995, the University of Buenos Aires in 2012, the Universidad Santo Tomás in 2015, the National University of San Martín in 2015, and the University of Chile in 2017. He had produced an expansive body of work numbering some forty books on a range of subjects including the philosophy of liberation, ethics, political economy, theology, history and modernity/postmodernity. Much of his work is so far only limitedly available in English, and some contend that his work has not received the broader attention it warrants.

Additionally, he was a visiting professor for one semester at Frankfurt University, Notre Dame University, California State University, Los Angeles, Union Theological Seminary (a Protestant seminary), Loyola University Chicago, Vanderbilt University, Duke University, Harvard University, and others. In March 2013 he was named the interim rector of the Universidad Autónoma de la Ciudad de México for a period of one year.

Dussel maintained dialogue with philosophers such as Karl-Otto Apel, Gianni Vattimo, Jürgen Habermas, Richard Rorty and Emmanuel Lévinas Author of more than 50 books, his thoughts cover many themes including: theology, politics, philosophy, ethics, political philosophy, aesthetics, and ontology. He was a critic of postmodernity, preferring instead the term "transmodernity."

Dussel died on 5 November 2023, at the age of 88.

== Philosophy of liberation ==
Enrique Dussel is one of the primary figures along with others such as Rodolfo Kusch, Arturo Roig, and Leopoldo Zea, in the philosophical movement referred to as the Philosophy of Liberation. The philosophical content is heterogenous but arises from and responds to the particular historical/socio-political context of Latin America as part of a global periphery (see Dependency Theory). The movement originated in Argentina in the early 1970s but during the period of military dictatorship it dispersed across Latin America as many intellectuals were forced into exile. Subsequently, the Philosophy of Liberation has been highly influential both in Latin America and beyond. The philosophy of liberation seeks to critique structures of colonialism, imperialism, globalization, racism, and sexism, from the particular experience of exploitation and alienation of the global periphery. It poses a direct challenge to the discourses of Euro-American philosophy, and emphasizes the socio-political responsibilities of Latin American philosophy towards the project of historical liberation. His analysis focused on the criteria of material and formal content, as well as feasibility.

== Philosophy of history ==
This work consists of edited versions of six lectures given by Dussel in 1972. Intended to sketch ideas later developed in a second volume entitled Ethics and the Theology of Liberation, the text gives a wide-ranging account, focused on the history of the church and its role in Latin America, with the overarching goal of elaborating a distinctly Latin American Theology, centered around a liberatory politics. Dussel is concerned primarily with history, particularly in constructing a sense of the history of Latin America, and a sense of participation in a historical process towards liberation. His account reaches back to human origins, and includes topics ranging from Aztec and Inca belief systems and worldviews to the origins of Christianity, to the Byzantine Empire, to the role of the church in Spanish conquest. The second half of the book covers the 20th century, addressing the political upheavals of the 1960s, the violence and oppression endured under military regimes, the response of the church, and the question of violent and non-violent resistance in Christian thinking. Dussel also explores the compatibility of socialism with Christian doctrine, and the possibility of a uniquely Latin American socialism. The single thread which runs most prominently through each section is the question of resistance to oppression. Dussel explores through exegesis the Christian obligation to overcome the sin of oppression through commitment to selfless action towards the goal of historical liberation.

== Select bibliography ==
- Hipótesis para el estudio de Latinoamérica en la historia universal. Investigacion del “mundo” donde se constituyen y evolucionan las “Weltanschauungen, 1966.
- El humanismo semita, 1969.
- Para una de-strucción de la historia de la ética I, 1972.
- La dialéctica hegeliana. Supuestos y superación o del inicio originario del filosofar, 1972 (2a. ed.: Método para una filosofía de la liberación. Superación analéctica de la dialéctica hegeliana, 1974).
- América Latina dependencia y liberación. Antología de ensayos antropológicos y teológicos desde la proposición de un pensar latinoamericano, 1973.
- Para una ética de la liberación latinoamericana I, 1973.
- Para una ética de la liberación latinoamericana II, 1973.
- El dualismo en la antropología de la cristiandad, 1974.
- Liberación latinoaméricana y Emmanuel Levinas, 1975.
- El humanismo helénico, 1975.
- History and the theology of liberation. A Latin American perspective, Orbis Books, New York, 1976.
- Filosofía ética latinoamericana III, 1977.
- Introducción a una filosofía de la liberación latinoaméricana, 1977.
- Introducción a la filosofía de la liberación, 1977.
- Filosofía de la liberación, 1977.
- Religión, 1977.
- Ethics and the theology of liberation, Orbis Books, New York, 1978.
- Filosofía de la poiesis. Introducción histórica, 1977 (Reedición aumentada: Filosofía de la producción, 1984).
- Filosofía ética latinoamericana IV: La política latinoamericana. Antropológica III, 1979.
- Philosophy of Liberation, Wipf & Stock Publishers, 2003 [1980]
- Filosofía ética latinoamericana V: Arqueológica latinoamericana. Una filosofía de la religión antifetichista, 1980.
- Liberación de la mujer y erótica latinoamericana. Ensayo filosófico, 1980.
- La pedagógica latinoamericana, 1980.
- The History of the Church in Latin America: Colonialism to Liberation (1492-1979), Eerdmans, 1981
- Praxis latinoamericana y filosofía de la liberación, 1983.
- La producción teórica de Marx. Un comentario a los Grundrisse, 1985.
- Ética comunitaria, 1986.
- Hacia un Marx desconocido. Un comentario de los Manuscritos del 61-63, 1988.
- El último Marx (1863–1882) y la liberación latinoamericana. Un comentario a la tercera y cuarta redacción de “El Capital”, 1990.
- 1492: El encubrimiento del Otro. Hacia el origen del “mito de la Modernidad”, 1992.
- Las metáforas teológicas de Marx, 1994.
- Apel, Ricoeur, Rorty y la Filosofía de la Liberación con respuestas de Karl-Otto Apel y Paul Ricoeur, 1994.
- Historia de la filosofía y filosofía de la liberación, 1994.
- Ethics & Community (Liberation & Theology), Hyperion Books, 1994
- The Invention of the Americas: Eclipse of "the Other" and the Myth of Modernity, Continuum Intl Pub Group, 1995
- The Underside of Modernity: Apel, Ricoeur, Rorty, Taylor and the Philosophy of Liberation, Humanity Books, 1996.
- Ética de la liberación en la edad de la globalización y la exclusión, 1998.
- Ética de la liberación ante Apel, Taylor y Vattimo con respuesta crítica inedita de K.-O. Apel, 1998.
- Hacia una filosofía política crítica, 2001.
- Towards an Unknown Marx: A Commentary on the Manuscripts of 1861-1863, Routledge, London, 2001
- Beyond Philosophy: History, Marxism, and Liberation Theology, Rowman and Littlefield, Maryland, 2003.
- Ética del discurso y ética de la liberación (con Karl-Otto Apel), 2005.
- 20 tesis de política, 2006.
- Filosofía de la cultura y la liberación, 2006.
- Política de la liberación. Historia mundial y crítica, 2007.
- Materiales para una política de la liberación, 2007.
- Frigørelsesfilosofi, Forlaget Politisk Revy, København, 2008.
- Twenty Theses on Politics, Silliman University Press, Durham, 2008.
- Política de la liberación: Arquitectónica, 2009.
- Politics of Liberation (Reclaiming Liberation Theology), SCM Press, Manila, Philippines, 2011.
- Ethics of Liberation: In the Age of Globalization and Exclusion, Duke University Press, Durham, 2013.
