= Integral mission =

Christian teaching embracing both evangelism and social responsibility

Integral mission or holistic mission describes an understanding of Christian mission that embraces both evangelism and social responsibility. With origins in Latin America, integral mission has influenced a significant number of Protestants around the world through the Lausanne Movement.

== Terminology ==
It is generally known in Spanish as misión integral, coined in the 1970s by members of the Protestant group Latin American Theological Fellowship (or FTL, its Spanish acronym). The word "integral" is used in Spanish to describe wholeness (as in wholemeal bread or whole wheat). Theologians use it to describe an understanding of Christian mission that affirms the importance of expressing the love of God and neighborly love through every means possible. Proponents such as C. René Padilla of Ecuador, Samuel Escobar of Peru, Orlando E. Costas of Puerto Rico, Vinay Samuel of India, and John Stott from the UK, have wanted to emphasize the breadth of the Good News and of the Christian mission, and used the concept of "integral" or "holistic" mission to signal their discomfort with conceptions of Christian mission based on a dichotomy between evangelism and social involvement.

The proponents of integral mission argue that the concept is nothing new. Rather, it is rooted in Scripture and wonderfully exemplified in Jesus’ own ministry. "Integral mission" is only a distinct vocabulary for a holistic understanding of mission that has become important in the past forty years in order to distinguish it from widely held but dualistic approaches that emphasize either evangelism or social responsibility.

== History ==
=== 1960s–1980s ===
The process of defining integral mission and the journey of its acceptance by significant numbers of Protestants has taken place over a period of just over 40 years. Its progress can be observed through a number of significant international Evangelical congresses. In 1966, the Congress on the World Mission of the Church, held in Wheaton, Illinois, brought together Evangelicals from 71 countries. The Wheaton Declaration confessed that "we [Evangelicals] are guilty of an unscriptural isolation from the world that too often keeps us from honestly facing and coping with its concerns" and the "failure [of the church] to apply scriptural principles to such problems as racism, war, population explosion, poverty, family disintegration, social revolution, and communism."

By contrast, that same year the World Congress on Evangelization in Berlin continued to emphasise a traditionally Evangelical conception of mission, as articulated by Billy Graham: “if the church went back to its main task of proclaiming the gospel and people converted to Christ, it would have a far greater impact on the social, moral and psychological needs of men than it could achieve through anything else it could possibly do. However, the question of Christian social involvement came up repeatedly during the ensuing regional congresses.

The International Congress on World Evangelization in Lausanne in 1974 is regarded by some as "the most important world-wide evangelical gathering of the twentieth century." The Lausanne Covenant affirmed: "God is both the Creator and the Judge of all men. We therefore should share his concern for justice and reconciliation throughout human society and for the liberation of men from every kind of oppression ... we express penitence both for our neglect and for having sometimes regarded evangelism and social concern as mutually exclusive."

Following the Lausanne Congress, support for the concept of integral mission grew amongst evangelicals, particularly in the Two-Thirds World. A number of declarations which emerged from international evangelical conferences in the ensuing years (some of them organized by the Lausanne Movement and chaired by John Stott) revealed similar concerns for a holistic understanding of mission. Of critical importance for the development of the theology of integral mission were the various Latin American Congresses on Evangelism (CLADE, their Spanish acronym—Congreso Latinoamericano de Evangelización). Beginning with the Second Latin America Congress on Evangelism, held in Peru in 1979, the CLADES (III, Quito, 1992; IV, Quito, 2000) were organized by the Latin American Theological Fellowship (FTL).

In the UK, the International Consultation on Simple Lifestyle in 1980 resulted in a document entitled "An Evangelical Commitment to Simple Lifestyle," again affirming a commitment to justice within an Evangelical conception of mission.

In 1982, the International Consultation on the Relationship of Evangelism and Social Responsibility concluded that the latter is a consequence of, a bridge to and partner of the former. The document published maintained the primacy of evangelism, despite its affirmation that the two are in practice inseparable.

In 1983, the Consultation on the Church in Response to Human Need in Wheaton, Illinois, led to the publication of "Transformation: The Church in Response to Human Need," perhaps the strongest evangelical affirmation of integral Mission. It is explicit in its denunciation of injustice, and churches and Christian organisations who "by silence give their tacit support" to "the socio-economic status-quo."

=== Since the 1990s ===
A commitment to integral mission is often reflected in particular concern for those living in poverty and a commitment to pursuing justice. The concept of integral mission is advocated largely by Evangelical Christians, many of whom are related to the Micah Network.

In 1999 a global network of evangelical Christian organisations committed to Integral Mission was established and christened the Micah Network, which owes its name to the centrality of Micah 6:8 to the concept of Integral Mission: "What does the Lord require of you but to do justice, and to love kindness, and to walk humbly with your God." Their members represent approximately 600 Evangelical service organizations, churches and individual members around the world.
