= The Liberation of Theology =

1976 book on theology by Juan Luis Segundo

- Author: Juan Luis Segundo
- Translator: John Drury
- Publisher: Orbis Books
- Publication date: 1976

The Liberation of Theology (1976) is a book on theology written by Juan Luis Segundo, S.J., translated by John Drury, and published by Orbis Books.

== Background ==
This book was written 8 years after the Medellin Conference of Latin American Bishops. Juan Luis Segundo was not invited to the conference, but met with others near the conference and wrote immediate responses to what was being said. Many books were written and translated into English in those 8 subsequent years “doing” the theology in the context of Latin America. This book is an attempt to “theologize” about the theology of liberation itself.

Liberation Theology had come under attack for not being a theology at all. At times it was compared to Marxism. It had been said that it was an ideology masquerading as theology. Younger Christians at the time were seeking an ideology and not finding it in the Christian faith. Segundo responds to this climate by addressing these words and their meaning and how a Biblical perspective can be applied to the political world.

== Main thesis ==
A primary reality to which Juan Luis Segundo responds is the fact that liberation theology, like any theological movement in its developmental stages, performs theological work in traditional ways: by looking to the biblical and dogmatic traditions. Segundo explains that liberation theology performed its theologizing while "feeling a responsibility towards both the problems of real life and the canons of worldwide theology". However, it did theology in the only way it knew how, with the “means at its disposal”. While liberation theology did not adopt the learned style of academic theology and conform to its standards of detail and form in presentation, it also did not do theology in an aggressive, abrupt, way in order “to meet some inescapable pragmatic necessity”. In other words, Segundo sees a need for a critical evaluation of theological methodology and seeks to aggressively attack all the inconsistencies and contradictions that fill the myriad sociological and theological understandings of the world. Segundo is not interested in the content of liberation theology as much as he is trying to think about “the method used to theologize in the face of our real-life situation”. Segundo is primarily concerned with the liberation of the theological process, and notices a problem with the way theology is done that constricts liberation theology from flourishing in Latin America.

== The Hermeneutic Circle ==
Segundo seeks to combine the disciplines that open up the past with the disciplines that help to explain the present. To do this, he first lays out a "hermeneutic circle".

1. Preconditions
  1. Profound and enriching questions and suspicions about our current reality
  2. A new interpretation of the Bible that is equally profound and enriching
2. Factors of the circle
  1. Our way of experiencing reality that leads us to ideological suspicion.
  2. Application of our ideological suspicion to the whole ideological superstructure in general and to theology in particular.
  3. A new way of experiencing theological reality that leads us to exegetical suspicion, that is, to the suspicion that the prevailing interpretation of the Bible has not taken important pieces of data into account.
  4. That we can end up with a new way of interpreting the Bible with the new elements at our disposal.

At first, Segundo is in search of an estimation of reality that completes this hermeneutic circle; he evaluates the work of Harvey Cox (The Secular City), Karl Marx's view of religion, Max Weber on the Protestant ethic, and James Hal Cone (A Black Theology of Liberation) in order to demonstrate the hermeneutic circle and point out how it is that these thinkers either completed or did not complete various stages. Primarily, however, Segundo wishes to apply this hermeneutic to the situation of Latin American theology. In other words, the “experience in reality” of the first stage of the hermeneutic circle, or the situation that leads him to question the ideologies present for understanding the historical moment, is the situation in which liberation theology finds itself. This is the situation he subjects to the hermeneutic circle in this book. Assuming he is successful in completing this hermeneutic circle in his evaluation of the situation in which liberation theology finds itself in Latin America, a summary of the content of each of these stages in Segundo’s case helps to organize our summation of what it is he is doing in his book. First, he explains the situation of liberation theology in Latin America and gives the reasons why this reality leads him to question the ideologies present for understanding this situation. Second, he applies his suspicion to the ideological structure for understanding why liberation theology must be in this situation. He initiates an aggressive attack on sociology, politics, and ideologies perpetuated by the Church regarding these dynamics. Third, he arrives at a plethora of logical conclusions, new insights, and provocative questions all of which inspire new directions, alternative suggestions for, and aggressive challenges to status quo theologies and assumptions. As a result, he questions traditional exegesis and explores different interpretations of scripture regarding liberation. Fourth, he arrives at a new way of interpreting Scripture and the Christian tradition. This new hermeneutic is primarily concerned with liberation of the theological process, and interprets Scripture in new light.

With Marx, he runs into some difficulty in that Marx did not define some of his terms well, such as historical materialism. When it comes to religion Marx said, “Religious suffering is at once an expression of real suffering and a protest against real suffering.” He does not elaborate on how this protest occurs, instead he says, “Religion… is the opium of the people.” He makes no effort to change religion, only suggests it be abolished. This interrupts the hermeneutic circle. Marx is not interested in trying to find if a new interpretation of Christianity favoring the class struggle, can be found.

== Sociology ==
Having established how to go about applying theology, Segundo then sets himself to apply this analysis to the historical moment for Latin America. Throughout, he stresses that theology worthy of attention “comes from a pre-theological commitment to change and improve the world”. Liberation is the goal of the theological task and of the Christian faith.

In his review of the current context, he notes that the average Christian is bonded to God through an unchanging liturgical calendar with Sunday services and sacraments. “To the majority of Christians it undoubtedly means that God is more interested in nontemporal things than in solutions for the historical problems that are cropping up.” He hypothesizes “that sacramental theology has been influenced more by unconscious social pressures than by the gospel message itself.” He supports this hypothesis by quoting from Hebrews 10:9-10 and 14, which states that all people have been consecrated for all time. This seems in conflict with a Church that has ongoing ceremonies for people to receive grace.

As he further tries to use sociology to understand the world, he reviews the work of Argentinean sociologist Eliseo Verón who describes shifts in sociology indicating sociology was retreating from the ground that Marx had claimed in The German Ideology. This retreat imposed difficulties for analyzing the relation of religious mechanisms and how they relate to cultural adaptations. The shift from the unconscious level to the conscious for example has significant consequences. It is the unconscious belief in their own ideology that allows the ruling class to justify its domination. Sociological investigations were only asking respondents to reflect on their perceptions at a conscious level. Segundo sees this as a problem because “The influence of unconscious social factors on the elaboration of Christian eschatology is one of the key points for any liberation theology.”

== Politics ==
Failing to find a sociology that can understand the current situation adequately and verify its hypothesis with scientific certitudes, Segundo is forced into politics. This is the realm of professionals who are experts at making decisions without scientific proof for support. He has some reservations about this, but sums up the relationship of religion and politics with three points.

The relationship of religion and politics:

1. Every theology is political. Its influence can’t be evaded. “The worst politics of all would be to let theology perform this function unconsciously, for that brand of politics is always bound up with the status quo.”
2. “Liberation theology consciously and explicitly accepts its relationship with politics.”
3. “When academic theology accuses liberation theology of being political and engaging in politics, thus ignoring its own tie-up with the political status quo it is really looking for a scapegoat to squelch its own guilt complex.”

=== Theology is the second step ===
At this point, Segundo also stops to remind the reader of the statement by Gustavo Gutiérrez that “theology comes after.” To explain this Segundo says, “real-life conduct depends in part on knowledge and appreciation of the context which cannot be deduced from the divine revelation” and “We live and struggle in the midst of decisive contextual conflicts without science being able to provide any ready-made option in advance. Once a human being has made some general option, science or scholarship can point out some set of instruments that would dovetail with his option.” But even this does not address the value of what we are doing.

He goes on to say theology is not an exception to this order of living. Theology only has meaning when it supposes a prior option before an acceptance of divine revelation and retains meaning by staying in touch with a real-life context. And concludes, “The only real problem is trying to decide whether it puts a person in a better position to make a choice and to change the world politically.”

He follows up this phenomenological analysis with an exegetical one of the gospels, including the early passages in the Gospel of Mark. Here the Pharisees attempt to trap Jesus using their understanding of theological certitudes, but past revelation has nothing to say about Jesus, nothing that can be deduced about him. When Jesus says, “Is it permitted to do good or evil on the Sabbath” (Mark 3), the Pharisees are stumped. Jesus has taken human beings into account ahead of abstract classical theology.

=== Commitment is the first step ===
The line of argument Segundo has followed so far leads him to an important question that was being asked by various Latin American theologians at the time, “Is it possible to know and recognize the liberation message of the Gospel at all without a prior commitment to liberation?”

He concludes the section on politics with an analysis of the Christian Democratic party in Chile and its role in the election of Allende. The failure of that political movement leaves him with the question, do Christians need to wait for a political option to appear that they can then apply the gospel message to?

== Ideology ==
Segundo realizes the discussion so far has led to dangerous issues. If his analysis is the logical conclusion of the Medellín Conference, there are serious implications for the Church. He notes two facts;

1. “the alarm of Latin American church authorities at the unexpected consequences of the doctrines they formulate at Medellín as an accurate reflection of Vatican II
2. The perturbation of significant groups of Christian lay people with a magisterium that seems to be in steady retreat ever since Medellin.”

To deal with these problems, Segundo first needs to deal with the relationship of faith and ideology. He begins with a theme from Albert Camus’ Caligula, that life is only lived once, in a forward direction. Non-empirical choices are made presuming they will lead to satisfaction, giving direction to the means and ends used to attain it. That is how he is using “ideology”. The choices are not made after considerations of decades of living, rather it is a process, beginning early and depending on trust in others. So faith and ideology are linked.

Ideologies rely on their reasons and arguments to support it. Faith attempts to convince people that they hold absolute values. Segundo states that to be logically consistent to his deductions, he must say that faith does not provide him with absolute truth. Rather, through the process of historical encounters with the objective font of absolute truth, bound with a changing context humans came to recognize ideologies. “Through the process people learned how to learn with the help of ideologies.”. So Jesus has two natures, one human and one divine. “While faith certainly is not an ideology, it has sense and meaning only insofar as it serves as the foundation stone for ideology.”

To complete the Hermeneutic circle, Segundo surveys all of Christian history, including the early church as chronicled in the gospels. He finds it proclaiming Christ’s grace in the Romans 5 and the rejection of that grace in 2 Cor 4:3, 1 Cor 1:18 and 2 Cor 2:15. This is a contradiction of the universal victory of Christ and membership in the Church as a requirement for receiving that grace. Karl Barth noted this ambivalence and stated that faith is not a human disposition for winning divine salvation, rather a recognition of the fact that redemption has been granted for all.

He finds himself at the third stage, experiencing theology in a new way, in which he determines that it is impossible for humans to escape the grasp of ideologies and the historical situation. This poses serious problems for the Church’s traditional claim to possess absolute certitude regarding the doctrines of the faith and interpretation of scripture, but allows Segundo to conclude that humans have the capacity to confront and formulate new questions inside historical situations without “being driven to retreat to the security of past beliefs and the status quo”(125). One result of this formulation is his observation that the Church’s eschatology is often stripped of any real historical import, and that decisions the church makes often serve the purpose of including as many people in the church as possible, rather than subjecting people to the complex process of dealing with the relativity of the historical situation and the influence of ideologies on the faith (209).

The new hermeneutic he finds himself with in the fourth stage is what he labels as the distinction between “mass man” and “minority elite” and the interaction of these social realities with theology. This dichotomy flows out of the attempt by the church to be liberation-minded while also relying on mass cohesion (232-233). It is about the balance between Christianity as a universal religion and a divergent sect challenging the status quo. He employs this framework in his interpretation of Scripture and his understanding of the Christian tradition and its activity in the world.

== Works cited ==
- Barth, Karl (1975). Church Dogmatics (Complete). Translated by T.H.L. Parker; W.B. Johnston; Harold Knight; J.L. Haire. T & T Clark.
- Marx, Karl (1964). Selected Writings in Sociology and Social Philosophy. Translated by Thomas Bottomore. McGraw-Hill.
- Segundo, Juan Luis (1976). The Liberation of Theology. Translated by John Drury. Orbis Books. ISBN 0-88344-285-X.
