= Dilexi te =

2025 apostolic exhortation of Pope Leo XIV

Dilexi te Latin for 'I have loved you' Apostolic exhortation of Pope Leo XIV
- Signature date: 4 October 2025
- Subject: To all Christians on love for the poor
- Number: 1 of 1 of the pontificate
- Text: In English

Dilexi te (English: "I have loved you") is the first apostolic exhortation of Pope Leo XIV, signed on 4 October 2025 and released on 9 October 2025. The exhortation, which was released on the feast day of Saint Francis, focuses on Christ's love for the poor and the call for the Church to renew its commitment to those most in need. It is subtitled "on love for the poor".

The official presentation of the exhortation took place on 9 October 2025 at the Holy See Press Office, with the participation of Cardinal Michael Czerny SJ, prefect of the Dicastery for Promoting Integral Human Development; Cardinal Konrad Krajewski, papal almoner; Father Frédéric-Marie Le Méhauté OFM; and Sister Clémence LSJ, a religious sister who works among the Roma women of southern Italy.

== History ==
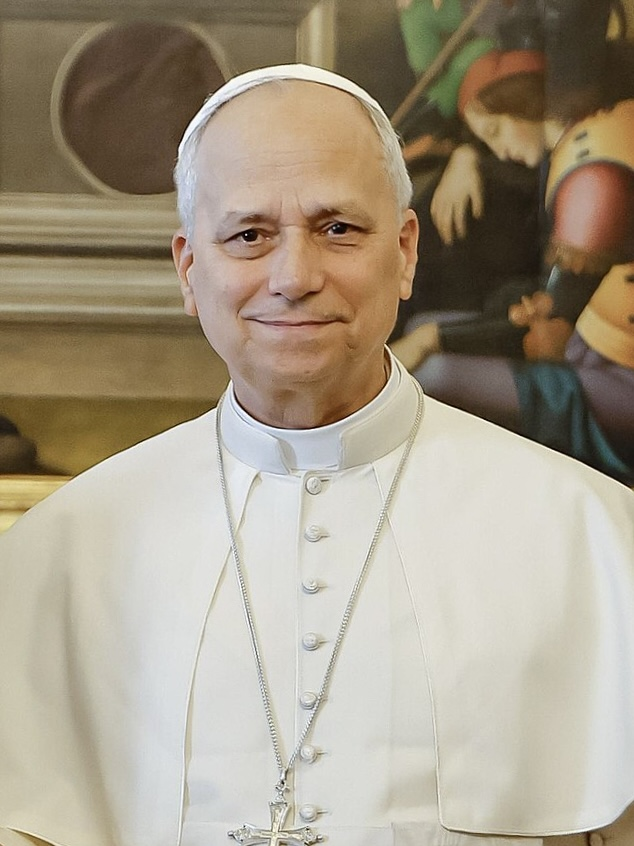
Pope Leo XIV in October 2025, the month Dilexi te was released

Dilexi te follows Pope Francis's fourth and final encyclical, Dilexit nos, subtitled "on the human and divine love of the Heart of Jesus Christ", and released on 24 October 2024. This connection highlights the thematic continuity regarding Christ's love for humanity (DT, Introduction). Francis died on 21 April 2025 and was succeeded by Pope Leo XIV. Reuters reported in September 2025 that Leo intended to release a document to "signal continuity with his predecessor Pope Francis and focus on the needs of the world's poor".

According to the introduction, early drafts of Dilexi te were prepared by Pope Francis in the months before his death, and Leo XIV decided to complete it with his own contributions (DT, 3). Of the document's 130 citations, 57 are to works by Francis.

=== Central themes ===
In Dilexi te, Pope Leo XIV places poverty at the center of his reflection, presenting it as a structural and universal issue affecting all societies (DT, ch. I).

The exhortation strongly denounces the persistence and multiplication of inequalities. It points out that, although efforts have been made to eradicate poverty, these remain insufficient in a world where new, more subtle forms of exclusion continue to emerge, proving equally harmful (DT, ch. I).

In response, the exhortation emphasizes that a concrete commitment to the poor must also be accompanied by a change in mentality that can have an impact at the cultural level (DT, ch. I).

== Content ==
The apostolic exhortation Dilexi te is divided into a brief introduction and five chapters.

=== Chapter 1: A Few Essential Words ===
The first chapter (paragraphs 4 to 15) describes poverty as a structural reality marked by exclusion, inequality, and loss of rights, anticipating further references to "structural causes of poverty and inequality" later in the text. The Pope underscores the value of small gestures of solidarity, and recalls Saint Francis of Assisi as a model of renewal. The text refers to the growing numbers of people living in poverty and the various ways in which poverty is manifested, rejecting views that blame the poor for their condition, and calling for addressing the deeper causes of poverty, alongside a change in social attitudes toward wealth and dignity.

=== Chapter 2: God Chooses the Poor ===
The second chapter (paragraphs 16 to 34) affirms that "God is merciful love", whose love is revealed in a special concern for the poor, and fulfilled in Jesus' life of poverty and solidarity with the excluded. It stresses that authentic faith is inseparable from mercy and justice, denouncing exploitation and unjust wealth while recalling the first Christian communities as examples of sharing and of care for the most vulnerable.

=== Chapter 3: A Church for the Poor ===
The third chapter (paragraphs 35-81) presents the Church's identity as inseparably linked to the poor, tracing a social tradition from the first Christians to patristic voices like John Chrysostom and Augustine, who denounce luxury and insist on sharing goods. It surveys institutional responses—care for the sick, monastic hospitality and assistance, the redemption of captives, mendicant poverty as public witness, and the rise of popular education initiatives—alongside contemporary ministries to migrants and those on society’s margins. Through historical examples, the witness of several recent saints and consideration of present-day practices, the text frames service to the poor not as optional charity but as a public criterion for credibility and renewal, and it acknowledges popular movements as partners in confronting structural injustice.

=== Chapter 4: A History that Continues ===
The fourth chapter (paragraphs 82-102) locates today's concern for poverty within 150 years of Catholic social teaching, from Pope Leo XIII's Rerum novarum (1891) to Pope Benedict XVI's Caritas in veritate (2009). It recalls the vision of a "Church of the poor" embraced by the Second Vatican Council, and the teachings of the Latin American episcopal conferences of Medellín, Puebla, and Aparecida. Poverty and inequality are described as "structures of sin", reinforced by economic systems that exclude the weak, while the decision made by some believers "to live among the poor, not merely to pay them an occasional visit but to live with them as they do" is described as "one of the highest forms of evangelical life". (DT 101)

=== Chapter 5: A Constant Challenge ===
The final chapter (paragraphs 103-121) affirms that care for the poor is a permanent mark of the Church and central to Christian identity. The text calls for both structural justice and concrete gestures, including work opportunities and almsgiving, as ways of encountering Christ in the marginalized. It concludes that boundless love and solidarity with the poor are the essential signs of a Church faithful to the Gospel.

== Reception ==
The apostolic exhortation drew attention for its message on immigration. Archbishop Timothy Broglio of the United States Conference of Catholic Bishops described the message of Dilexi te as "countercultural" and "a sharp contrast to the culture of fear" regarding "the challenges we face with contemporary migration". Katie Kelaidis of The New Republic remarked that Dilexi te "marks the triumph of Liberation Theology" and makes "clear that the moral center of contemporary global Catholicism is Latin America". Tim Reidy of America magazine also noted the "Latin American influence" of the apostolic exhortation, and noted that "Pope Leo—an American who spent much of his ministry in Peru—knows this history well". Other interpretations rejected the link to Liberation Theology, stating that the exhortation "explicitly grounds its social vision in traditional Catholic Social Doctrine rather than Liberation Theology. It rejects Marxist class struggle, focusing instead on Christology, spiritual detachment, and the universal call to charity."

== Sources ==
- Coppen, Luke (9 October 2025). "'Dilexi te': A brief guide for busy readers". The Pillar. This has additional information not mentioned above
