= Basic ecclesial community =

Type of Christian religious group

An ecclesial base community is a relatively autonomous Christian religious group that operates according to a particular model of community, worship, and Bible study. The 1968 Medellín, Colombia, meeting of Latin American Catholic bishops played a major role in popularizing them under the name basic ecclesial communities (BECs; also base communities; Spanish: comunidades eclesiales de base). These are small groups, originating in the Catholic Church in Latin America, that meet to reflect upon scripture and apply its lessons to their situation.

The concept of a base ecclesial community is found in the early Church, when the Church Fathers taught the Bible to believers to contribute to their spiritual formation. The purpose of the base ecclesial community engaged in Bible study is "be[ing] taught and nourished by the Word of God" and "being formed and animated by the inspirational power conveyed by Scripture".

The proliferation of base communities is due in part to the documents of the Second Vatican Council which called for the Catholic laity to take a more active role in the church, and also from the shortage of priests. They spread to Africa, and then to Asia where some have morphed into models for neighborliness in modern urban and ecumenical environments, with the hope that Christian renewal at the peripheries will impact cultural centers.

== Description ==
Present in both rural and urban areas, the base community, organized often illiterate peasants and proletarians into self-reliant worshiping communities through the tutelage of a priest or local lay member. Because established Christian parishes with active priests were often miles away and because high level church officials rarely visited even their own parishes these "base communities" were often the only direct exposure to the church for people in rural areas or those for whom a "local" church may be miles away. Thus, the base community was significant in changing popular interpretations of Roman Catholicism for multiple reasons.

Initially, their very structure encouraged discussion and solidarity within the community over submission to church authority and, as their very name suggests, made power seem to flow from the bottom or base upward. The influence of liberation theology meant that discussions within the church were oriented toward material conditions and issues of class interests. Through this process of consciousness raising, evangelizing turned into class consciousness.

== Emphasis ==
Other Base Communities came into existence in the Eastern Bloc, but with a different theological emphasis. They did not subscribe to liberation theology, as they were being persecuted by Marxists themselves (since liberation theology itself is intrinsically tied to Marxism). One of the best-known groups was Hungarian priest György Bulányi's "Bokor" (Bush) movement after World War II, which sought to save the teachings of the Christian Church and resist the increasing persecution by the Communist Party. The movement's ideals were simple, namely to express Christian love in three ways: giving, service and non-violence. Bulányi was jailed for life by the Communist régime of Mátyás Rákosi, General Secretary of the Hungarian Communist Party, in 1952, and was amnestied in 1960. However, he was not allowed to work as a priest. He continued to start small base communities illegally, and wrote illegal samizdat articles.

They are in some ways similar to Western cell groups (small groups), a notable component of many Pentecostal and some Protestant churches. Base Christian communities believe in helping people whose lives have been destroyed. Over 120,000 new churches have been set up to help the poor. The Base Christian communities follow the word of God and stand by the poor, helping the helpless. The Base Christian communities work to fulfill Christ's purpose to proclaim good news to the poor, tell them of hope, and to remind all people that there is always someone loving them somewhere, and that they still have a chance in life.

A Base Christian community is a group of people who join together to study the Bible, and then act according to a social justice oriented form of Christianity especially popular among the third world and the poor.

== Latin America ==
In the 1960s basic ecclesial communities (BEC) spread rapidly, encouraged by the emphasis which the Catholic bishops at the Second Vatican Council and at the Latin American Medellin Conference gave to more active engagement of the laity in living the gospel imperatives. BECs realize the presence of the church in all its aspects, as communion, servant, herald, sacrament, and institution. They present a pattern of Christian life which is less individualistic, self-interested, and competitive, as preferred by the poor in mutual support and co-responsibility. Due to a shortage of priests, the sacraments are not always accessible in some of these communities but for them the word of God is an "immediate point of reference, the source of inspiration, nourishment, and discernment, ... to shape a just society that will turn the word into reality and embody the gospel project in a coherent way, ... conscious of the gift given to us in Jesus Christ."

BECs were not a product of liberation theology; they existed before it arose, and have thrived despite some Vatican reaction against the liberation theology movement. The liberationists built upon the BEC movement, giving it a more explicitly social edge. Peruvian theologian Gustavo Gutiérrez, who coined the term "liberation theology", once said that ninety percent of the movement is the preferential option for the poor. The Latin American bishops, following up on their 1968 statement at Medellin which called for an "effective preference to the needy and poorest sectors" of society, issued in 1979 at Puebla a document entitled "A Preferential Option for the Poor". Then in 2007, with Pentecostal and Evangelical movements threatening the faith of Catholics within the impoverished peripheries of Latin America’s mega-cities, these bishops at the Fifth Episcopal Conference of Latin America and the Caribbean ("Council of Aparecida") embraced the base communities as a pastoral model.

A decline in base communities in some parts of Latin America has been attributed to Pope John Paul II's appointment of more conservative bishops and his difficulty in understanding the complexities of liberation theology. The Argentine-born Pope Francis's message "often has stood in marked contrast to the words of his two predecessors. Francis has in fact sought to revive liberation theology in its pastoral application—... what theologians call 'base community' work in the region's slums and marginalized areas." He has averaged a trip a year to Latin America during his papacy. Speaking from his experience in Latin America, Francis has highly extolled "popular movements", which demonstrate the "strength of us" and serve as a remedy to the "culture of the self". He sees such movements as an "antidote to populism" and as capable of revitalizing democracies which he finds "increasingly limp, threatened, and under scrutiny over countless factors." The communities have received strong endorsement from the Catholic hierarchy, beginning with the Latin American bishops at Medellin in the wake of Vatican II, who strove "to encourage and favor the efforts of the people to create and develop their own grassroots organizations for the redress and consolidation of their rights and the search for true justice." In 2016, the bishops' committee for the accompaniment of base ecclesial communities on the continent issued the statement: "In this ecclesial spring, aroused by the gestures and doctrine of Pope Francis, the communities have been strengthened and renewed in their evangelizing and missionary enthusiasm. We reaffirm our conviction that the communities are the Church of Jesus at the base, the poor and poor Church." One example of the need for these communities would be Guatemala where a single parish among the native Mayans has 100,000 members in 53 distinct communities served by 3,000 lay ministers. The diocesan bishop here is Álvaro Leonel Ramazzini Imeri who was made a cardinal by Pope Francis in the 5 October 2019 consistory. The cardinal has long been an advocate for the poor, and has survived several death threats.

=== Brazil ===
The Brazilian Paulo Freire's classic work Pedagogy of the Oppressed increased literacy and raised the awareness of human rights. This furthered the BEC movement and "provided a springboard for Liberation theologians, most of whom were inspired by the theological insights they learnt from the struggles of poor communities." Brazil has had members of the Catholic clergy who gained an international reputation as defenders of the poor, such as Archbishop Hélder Câmara, Cardinal Paulo Evaristo Arns, Cardinal Aloísio Lorscheider, and Leonardo Boff. BECs have afforded protection for social activists, as in the Amazon region where land seizures are a contentious issue. The proliferation of BECs in Brazil was particularly widespread in comparison to the rest of Latin America: it has been estimated that the amount of base communities in the country at the peak of the liberationist movement counted at least 70,000, with upwards of two and a half million members.

The Message of Pope Francis to the Participants in the 13th Meeting of the Basic Ecclesial Communities in Brazil, in January 2014, declared that "the motto of this meeting, 'BECs Pilgrims of the Kingdom, in the Countryside and the City', must resound like a call so that they might increasingly assume their very important role in the Church’s mission of evangelization." Quoting the Document of Aparecida, Francis stated that BECs allow people "to attain greater knowledge of the Word of God, a greater social commitment in the name of the Gospel, for the birth of new forms of lay service and adult education in the faith." He had chaired the committee that drafted the Aparecida document. Francis also recalled his more recent statement to the whole church, that base communities "bring a new evangelizing fervor and a new capacity for dialogue with the world whereby the Church is renewed."

=== Mexico ===
As elsewhere in Latin America, Mexico's base communities began spreading organically early in the 1960s, eventually finding institutional backing in the preferential option for the poor proposed at Vatican II and affirmed by CELAM at the Second Conference of Latin America Bishops in 1968 at Medellín, Colombia. One of the main causes for the spread of base communities in the country were concerns over widespread poverty and malnutrition, in addition to the increasing gap in the ratio of Catholic priests to parishioners characteristic of all of Latin America during the 20th century. At times, an entire diocese of over 50,000 people might have only one priest; this was especially true in rural areas that were difficult to reach. Church officials considered the BEC's promotion of lay training, participation, and leadership, along with the "See-Judge-Act" method practiced within, as a potential solution to both of these problems and thus encouraged their development throughout the country. Beginning in the 1980s, an additional factor inspiring the formation of base communities in Mexico was support and solidarity for refugees fleeing from civil wars and military dictatorships in Guatemala, Nicaragua, and El Salvador. Though often considered a rural phenomenon, there is a considerable presence of base communities in urban areas as well, often located within colonias populares, such as the base communities of Santa Cecilia, Guadalajara, or Oaxaca City, Oaxaca.

Mexico's base communities have historically relied on the continued support of the Church hierarchy—that is, the Bishop or Archbishop of the region—in order to both arise and persist. In dioceses where the Church leadership was unsympathetic to BECs or the progressive theology of liberation, communities struggled to establish themselves and existing groups quickly sputtered out, for instance in cases where a Bishop was moved to another diocese or replaced with a conservative one, such as occurred with the Regional Seminary of the Southeast (SERESURE) when its leadership was changed by the Vatican in 1990. Today, Mexico's base community network continues to thrive, and continues to release pastoral plans every few years.

==== Guadalajara ====
The base communities of Santa Cecilia, Guadalajara stand out for the predominant presence of women as members, organizers, and leaders. Beginning as small reflection groups, the nuns of the Religiosas del Sagrado Corazón de Jesús (RSCJ) gathered women from throughout the city to discuss domestic and neighborhood issues. Soon, these small groups grew into flourishing base communities, featuring both women's and men's Bible study/reflection groups, undertaking community projects such as establishing water and trash services, and hosting education programs that encouraged members to practice the "See-Judge-Act" method of conscientization and activism developed by Paulo Freire. By 1972, at least twenty different base community groups met regularly in Santa Cecilia, additionally training members as catechists to provide religious service to thousands of parishioners. In an era dominated by machismo, in which institutional and familial patriarchy relegated women to the domestic sphere, women's experiences in the Santa Cecilia base communities were especially significant. Indeed, the women of these communities worked tirelessly to confront the double standards of their time and break free from the "dominant culture's public-private division" which relegated them to the household. A key part of this liberatory experience for the women of Santa Cecilia's base communities were empowering moments of confronting, challenging, and defeating powerful men such as bosses, factory owners, or even their own husbands and fathers.

When the RSCJ Nuns left Santa Cecilia in 1985, it was difficult for the communities to maintain such a high degree of organization and participation, eventually dissolving. Yet, while the communities themselves may not have persisted, the conscientizing education and empowering experiences they facilitated served as the basis for further community activism, establishing networks that continued to support and promote popular movements and education.

==== Oaxaca ====
By 1980, the parish of San Juan Chapultepec was the largest in Oaxaca City, with nearly 50,000 members. The first base community in the city was founded the same year, in the nearby colonia popular Emiliano Zapata. Soon after, in 1982, Sisters Regina Johnson, Mildred Payne, and Carmen Lechthaler of the Maryknoll order arrived in the city to help organize and manage within the community, leading classes and Bible study groups. By 1989, there were no fewer than twenty-six base communities in the parish, and yet more in the other colonias of the city. The Sisters began their work by addressing some of the key issues of the neighborhood: malnutrition, and poverty. Within the small study groups characteristic of the base community model, they led conscientizing discussions which taught members that their poverty was not a natural state of the world, nor was it God's will—both common narratives up to this point—but rather a result of Mexico's glaring social inequalities and stark economic hierarchy, always returning to the Bible as their source of reflection. Additionally, courses on agriculture and health encouraged members to take up soybean planting as a more cost-effective source of protein than meat, which was costly to the point of unaffordability.

==== Coahuila ====
In Torreón, Coahuila, a group of progressive priests known as the Nazas-Aguanaval group were influential in the creation of base communities and other grassroots political organizing. The group formed early in the 1970s, part of a pastoral plan supported by Church authorities in the diocese that sought to bring more priests to the countryside, and included fathers Benigno Martínez, José Batarse, and Jesús de la Torre, among others.

=== Violent opposition ===
The Roosevelt Corollary to the Monroe Doctrine (1904) established a pattern of the United States imposing a capitalist model of development on Latin America, often to the detriment of the poorest peoples. "In Brazil and Central America, as U.S.-endorsed dictatorships made it increasingly dangerous for workers to gather, organize, and/or protest while their living conditions worsened, the sacred space of religious meetings often became the only environments left where workers could still somewhat safely convene, organize, share information, and plan protests," while finding vital support and healing.

However, "hundreds of thousands of defenseless BEC members were killed by state-sponsored, U.S.-trained and supported military, paramilitary, and police forces in no less than ten Latin American countries," including missionaries from the United States, local priests and a bishop.

== Africa ==
Many authors have pointed out the "sacramental service station" model of church established by colonialism runs contrary to the African cultural preference for close, participatory community. When The Association of Member Episcopal Conferences in Eastern Africa (AMECEA) Documentation Service "circulated a questionnaire in 1975 to ascertain how the dioceses ranked their priorities they were pleased to find that the highest priority in AMECEA was 'building Christian communities'." Then in 1994 at the first African Synod, the Bishops Conference in Africa described Small Christian Communities (SCC) as "the theological mainstay of the model of Church as Family of God". They are seen as "the ecclesiastical extension of the African extended family or clan", where the Christian faith is more intensely lived and shared.

In Africa's patriarchal societies, the challenge is to draw more men into these communities while ensuring that women's voices remain influential. "Due to the emergence and growth of SCCs, the church is no longer considered a remote reality subject solely to the direction of the ordained clergy. ...Women and men feel a sense of belonging, celebrate their shared faith and take responsibility for the mission of the church in the local context." By 2001, there were already more than 180,000 SCCs across the nine AMECEA countries of Eastern Africa.Healey, Joseph G. (2001). "Promoting Small Christian Communities in Africa through the Internet". International Journal of African Catholicism. A leading African theologian has suggested that SCCs can still learn from Latin America "to include attention to the socio-political, ecological and economic conditions of their context."Orobator, A. (January 27, 2013). "Small Christian Communities as a New Way of Becoming Church: Practice, Progress and Prospects". S2CID 54779712.

== Asia ==
At their assembly in Bandung, Indonesia, in 1990, the Federation of Asian Bishops' Conferences endorsed the promotion of Small Christian Communities (SCC) throughout Asia.as a new way of being church, as a "communion of communities"—participatory, ecumenical, and a leaven for the transformation of the world. Then in 1999 after the meeting of the Asian Synod of Bishops in New Delhi, Pope John Paul II wrote in his apostolic exhortation Ecclesia in Asia that "the Synod Fathers underlined the value of basic ecclesial communities as an effective way of promoting communion and participation in parishes and Dioceses, and as a genuine force for evangelization. These small groups help the faithful to live as believing, praying and loving communities like the early Christians (cf. Acts 2:44-47; 4:32-35)." John Paul II went on to describe them as "a solid starting point for building a new society, the expression of a civilization of love, ... and I encourage the Church in Asia, where possible, to consider these basic communities as a positive feature of the Church's evangelizing activity."

The diversity of religions and the small number of Christians in most parts of Asia have also led to experiments in forming local Basic Human Communities (BHC) open to people of all faiths. From these it is hoped that the new humanity will emerge, with small communities at the periphery feeding back to transform the center into the likeness of one world under God.

=== Philippines ===
In the Philippines, the formation of BECs has been adopted as the pastoral priority of the Church throughout the country. In 1991, the Second Plenary Council of the Philippines decreed: "Basic Ecclesial Communities under various names and forms—BCCs, small Christian communities, covenant communities—must be vigorously promoted for the full living of the Christian vocation in both urban and rural areas." The Council directed the Catholic Bishops' Conference of the Philippines (CBCP) to "issue an official statement on BECs, on their nature and functions as recognized by the Church, making it clear that they are not simply another organization. This official statement of the CBCP shall be, among other things, for the proper orienting of priests and seminarians. Training for work with BECs shall be made part of seminary formation." In 2007, the CBCP established the Episcopal Committee on Basic Ecclesial Communities with the task of assisting the dioceses in the promotion and formation of BECs. The small Christian communities in the Philippines often began as administrative or liturgical centers for the parishes, and have needed to evolve into consciousness-raising communities more like the Latin American model.

=== India ===
==== Bombay ====
The 1980 Bombay Priests Synod recognized SCCs as necessary to build community in city parishes characterized by individualism, impersonal relationships, superficial religious practice, and unconcern for others. "Believers were defined by the doctrinal truths they adhered to" with a privatized Christianity that ignored the social and communitarian dimensions of being disciples of Jesus Christ. The sense of community experienced at Sunday Mass was found to be too superficial to realize the sense of Christian community.[1][2]:122 From 1984 to 2006, virtually the whole Bombay archdiocese was formed into 1,800 SCCs. The program involved bringing together Catholics in neighborhood communities for Gospel sharing and service to the poor and needy, while maintaining links with the universal Church. Experience led to dividing SCCs into smaller clusters of about ten families, to facilitate presence and participation at the monthly meetings.[3]

==== Kerala ====
In Kerala, small Christian communities are widely organized as neighborhood-based family units, often known in Malayalam as Kudumba koottayma (family fellowship). An indigenous form of the family-unit system developed in the Syro-Malabar Archdiocese of Ernakulam-Angamaly. Archbishop Augustine Kandathil had advocated the formation of wards or units of families in parishes in the 1940s, and in 1974 "Parish Family Units" were established at St. Mary's Cathedral Basilica, Ernakulam. Groups of 20 to 30 neighboring families met monthly in members' homes for prayer, Scripture reading and discussion of the needs of families in the neighborhood. The system subsequently spread to other parishes and dioceses in Kerala.

Family units remain part of the pastoral organization of Syro-Malabar dioceses in Kerala. The Eparchy of Idukki, for example, describes Kudumba Koottayma as small groups of approximately 30 Catholic families within a parish which meet regularly to study and discuss the Bible, pray and organize charitable activities, with leadership entrusted primarily to laypeople. The Eparchy of Kanjirappally similarly identifies its Kudumbakoottayma groups as Small Christian Communities (SCCs).

Basic Christian Communities are also extensively used in Kerala's Latin Catholic dioceses. The Kerala Regional Latin Catholic Council states that all 12 Latin dioceses in Kerala have BCCs or family units as the basic cells of parishes. Typically comprising 20 to 30 families, they meet regularly in members' homes for prayer and discussion of social, educational and pastoral concerns, and send representatives to parish pastoral councils. In the Archdiocese of Trivandrum, BCCs consist of geographically defined groups of approximately 10 to 30 families which normally meet at least once a month in a member's home for prayer, Scripture reading and discussion, leading to community activities or programmes.

== Other countries ==
It has been suggested that to revitalize the Church in the Western world, neighborhood communities should become places where the Bible is reflected upon and applied, the faith shared and celebrated, in a more democratic rather than hierarchical structure. Priest and bishop become enablers, encouraging full missionary discipleship among the laity, overseeing from a distance rather than accustomed to control. The question which the clergy in the North must answer is what model of church best responds to the needs and expectations of the secular society.

A program that originated in the United States, now RENEW International, offers materials and training for parish-based discussion groups. Their programs have reached an estimated 25 million Catholics in 160 dioceses in the United States, Canada, South Africa, Australia, Venezuela, El Salvador, and Guatemala. Since 2007 it has sponsored the program Theology on Tap which involves young adults in faith discussions held in restaurants and taverns. RENEW International has a strong presence in England and in Africa. A similar effort originating in Italy in 1987 now involves thousands of people on five continents. Pope Francis has commended these cells for their ability to revive parishes, adding that: "If we have encountered Christ in our lives, then we cannot keep him only for ourselves. It is crucial that we share this experience with others as well."

== See also ==
- Catholic Church in Latin America
- Cell group
- Conventicle
