= Catholic Church in Latin America =

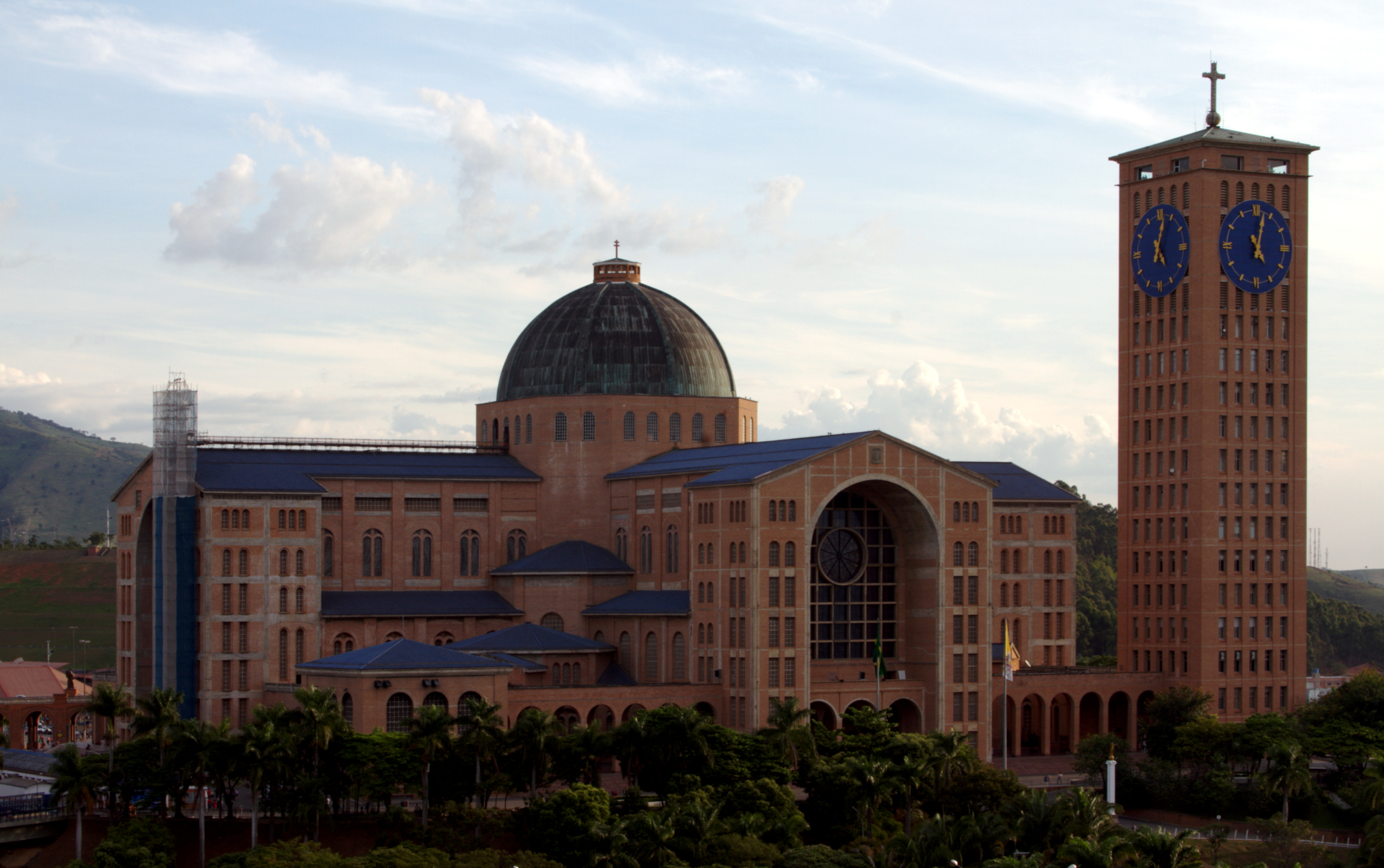
The Basilica of the National Shrine of Our Lady Aparecida in Aparecida, Brazil It is the second largest church in the world, after St. Peter's Basilica in Vatican City.

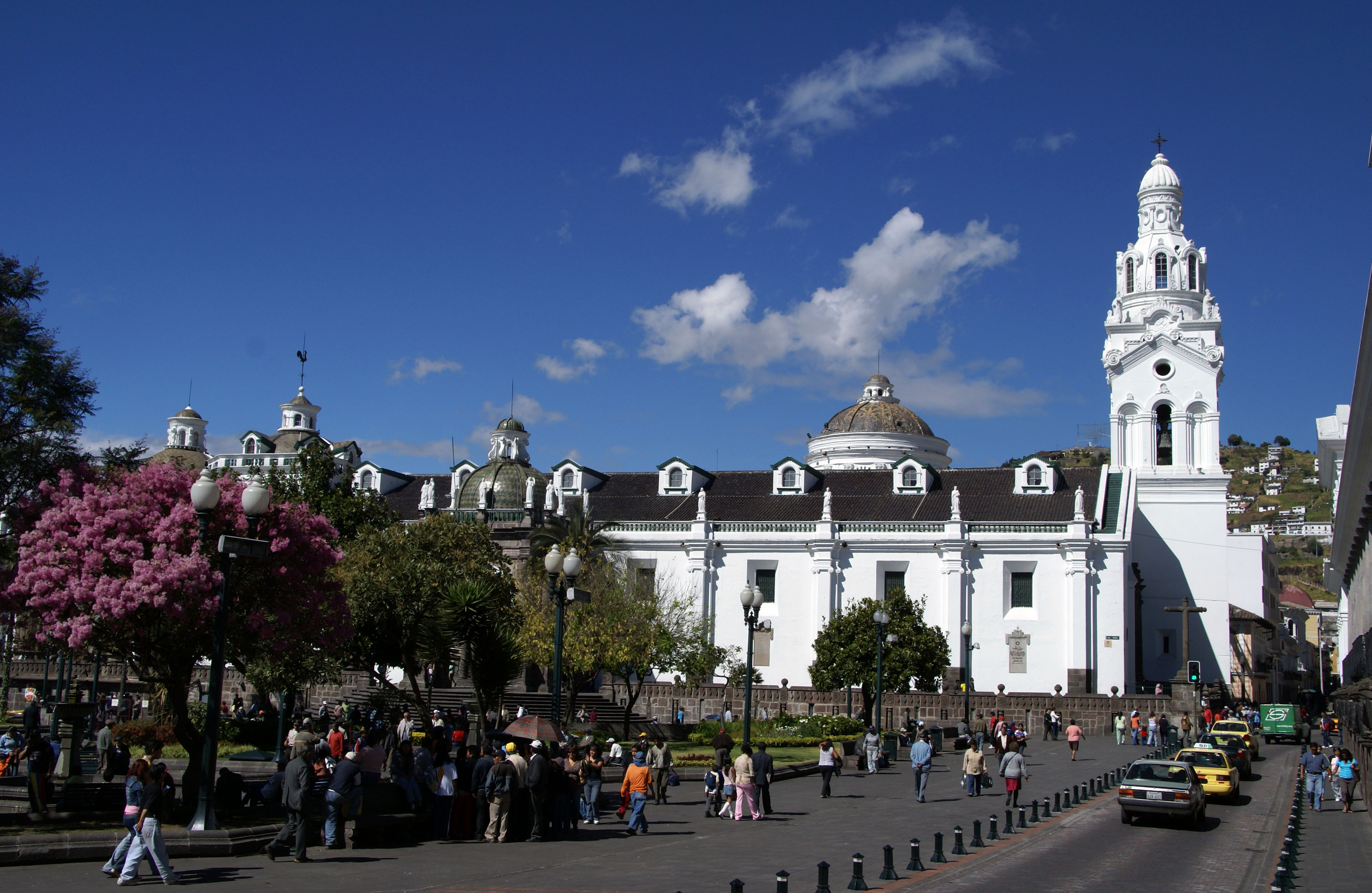
The Cathedral of Quito, constructed between 1562 and 1567, is regarded as the oldest cathedral in South America.

The Catholic Church in Latin America began with the Spanish and Portuguese colonization of the Americas and continues up to the present day. The vast majority of Latin Americans are Christians (90%), mostly Catholics belonging to the Latin Church. In 2012 Latin America constitutes, in absolute terms, the world's second largest Christian population; after Europe.

In comparison to Europe and some other Western nations, the Catholic Church still holds major influence over Latin American society. However, since the 21st century, Evangelicalism, backed by growing political influence, has expanded considerably across the region and is currently threatening the Catholic foothold.

== History ==
=== Spanish colonization of the Americas ===
The Spanish colonization of the Americas began with the voyage of Christopher Columbus in 1492. It is characterized by European colonization of missionary activity throughout the new world. Pope Alexander VI, in the papal bull Inter caetera, in an arbitration to avoid war over newly discovered lands, awarded colonial rights over most of the newly discovered lands to Spain and Portugal. The expansion of the Catholic Spanish Empire and Portuguese Empire with a significant role played by the Roman Catholic Church led to the Christianization of the indigenous populations of the Americas such as the Aztecs and Incas. Under the patronato system, state authorities controlled clerical appointments and no direct contact was allowed with the Vatican.

==== Catholic missions ====
The Requerimiento of 1512 served as a legal doctrine mandating that the Amerindians accept the Spanish monarch's power over the region and Christianity. The doctrine called for the Amerindians who abided by these demands to be considered "loyal vassals," but justified war against the Amerindians if they opposed the Spaniards' power and allowed for an aggressive conquest, resulting in the Amerindians being “deprived of their liberty and property.” The Requerimiento briefly alludes to the enslavement of the Amerindians as a result of the Spaniards' militaristic conquest of the region.

Slavery was part of the local population's culture before the arrival of the conquistadors. Christian missionaries provided existing slaves with an opportunity to escape their situation by seeking out the protection of the missions.

On December 1511, the Dominican friar Antonio de Montesinos openly rebuked the Spanish authorities governing Hispaniola for their mistreatment of the American natives, telling them "... you are in mortal sin ... for the cruelty and tyranny you use in dealing with these innocent people". King Ferdinand enacted the Laws of Burgos and Valladolid in response. Enforcement was lax, and while some blame the Church for not doing enough to liberate the Indians, others point to the Church as the only voice raised on behalf of indigenous peoples.

Francisco de Vitoria, an acclaimed professor of theology during the colonial era, opposed the idea of the Amerindians being "forcibly converted" to Catholicism on the premise that they would not truly accept the religion. However, in contrast with de Montesinos' views, de Vitoria reasoned that if the Amerindians were to oppose the Catholic faith with “blasphemies,” war against them would be justified.

During the colonial period, the Catholic missions also included efforts by the friars to educate the Amerindians. Although the missionaries focused on the "conversion", the friars also worked to educate the Amerindians about Spanish cultural expectations, social customs, and about "political organization through the mission system". Pedro de Gante, one of the first missionaries to arrive in Latin America during the colonial era, underscores in his letter to King Charles V of Spain the Spanish missionaries’ efforts to educate the Amerindians. In the letter, he argued that the Amerindians' workload under the Spanish colonists did not allow them to properly “provide for their families and the opportunity to become good Christians. In his letter, de Gante specifically requests that the king provide annual funding to run a local school and diminish the Amerindians’ workload to provide them with a “spiritual instruction.”

Nevertheless, Amerindian populations suffered serious decline due to new diseases, inadvertently introduced through contact with Europeans, which created a labor vacuum in the New World.

==== Franciscans ====
In 1522, the first Franciscan missionaries arrived in Mexico, establishing schools, model farms and hospitals. The ‘apostolic twelve’ were one of the first groups of friars to arrive in Mexico during the colonial period. The group initiated the “organized effort to evangelize the native people of Mexico.” The Franciscans’ views of Amerindians religious beliefs and evangelization strategies are highlighted letter by Friar Francisco Angelorum, providing instructions on their evangelization tasks in Mexico. Angelorum concludes that the Amerindians’ idols were a result of being “deceived by satanic wiles” and identifies preaching about the “Eternal Father” and spiritual “salvation” as the best means of evangelizing the Amerindians.

When some Europeans questioned whether the Indians were truly human and worthy of baptism, Pope Paul III in the 1537 bull Sublimis Deus confirmed that "their souls were as immortal as those of Europeans" and they should neither be robbed nor turned into slaves. Over the next 150 years, missions expanded into southwestern North America. Native people were often legally defined as children, and priests took on a paternalistic role, sometimes enforced with corporal punishment.

Junípero Serra, the Franciscan priest in charge of this effort, founded a series of missions which became important economic, political, and religious institutions. These missions brought grain, cattle and a new way of living to the Indian tribes of California. Overland routes were established from New Mexico that resulted in the colonization of San Francisco in 1776 and Los Angeles in 1781. However, by bringing Western civilization to the area, these missions and the Spanish government have been held responsible for wiping out nearly a third of the native population, primarily through disease.

Only in the 19th century, after the breakdown of most Spanish and Portuguese colonies, was the Vatican able to take charge of Catholic missionary activities through its Propaganda Fide organization. In a challenge to Spanish and Portuguese policy, Pope Gregory XVI, began to appoint his own candidates as bishops in the colonies, condemned slavery and the slave trade in the 1839 papal bull In supremo apostolatus, and approved the ordination of native clergy in the face of government racism. Yet in spite of these advances, the Amerindian population continued to suffer decline from exposure to European diseases.

==== Dominicans ====
Missionaries of the Dominican Order favored "doctrinal preaching and philosophical argument with religious opponents" as their specific method of evangelization. The Dominican friars gained immense fame as the Amerindians' advocates against "the Spaniards' abuse" and "exploitation of the Indians".

Pedro de Gante was one of the first Dominican friars to arrive in Latin America, and in his letter to King Charles V of Spain, he advocated for the Amerindians' rights. He argued that the Spanish colonists’ should avoid continuing to make harsh labor demands of Amerindians by noting how the native people did “not even have time to look after their subsistence” and would “die of hunger.”

Bartolome de Las Casas, another famed Dominican friar, also defended the Amerindians' rights and opposed the Spaniards’ view of the indigenous people as “barbarians” as an acceptable justification to massacre the indigenous population. In his work, In Defense of the Indians, de Las Casas underscored the Amerindians’ advanced “political states” and “architecture” to demonstrate that the Amerindians were not barbaric and indicate that the indigenous people had the capacity for rational thought and were “very ready to accept” Christianity.

==== Jesuits ====
Jesuit missions in Latin America were very controversial in Europe, especially in Spain and Portugal where they were seen as interfering with the proper colonial enterprises of the royal governments. The Jesuits were often the only force standing between the Native Americans and slavery. Together throughout South America but especially in present-day Brazil and Paraguay they formed Christian Native American city-states, called "reductions" (Spanish Reducciones, Portuguese Reduções). These were societies set up according to an idealized theocratic model. It is partly because the Jesuits, such as Antonio Ruiz de Montoya, protected the natives (whom certain Spanish and Portuguese colonizers wanted to enslave) that the Society of Jesus was suppressed.

Jesuit priests such as Manuel da Nóbrega and José de Anchieta founded several towns in Brazil in the 16th century, including São Paulo and Rio de Janeiro, and were very influential in the pacification, religious conversion and education of Indian nations.

The Jesuit Reductions were a particular version of the general Catholic strategy used in the 17th and 18th centuries of building reductions (reducciones de indios), in order to Christianize the indigenous populations of the Americas more efficiently. The reductions were created by the Catholic order of the Jesuits in South America, in areas inhabited by the Tupi-Guarani peoples, which generally corresponds to modern day Paraguay. Later reductions were extended into the areas that correspond to Argentina, Brazil, Bolivia and Uruguay.

In these regions the Jesuit reductions were different from the reductions in other regions, because the Indians were expected to adopt Christianity but not European culture. Under the Jesuit leadership of the Indians through native "puppet" caciques, the reductions achieved a high degree of autonomy within the Spanish and Portuguese colonial empires. With the use of Indian labour, the reductions became economically successful. When their existence was threatened by the incursions of Bandeirante slave traders, Indian militia were created that fought effectively against the colonists. The resistance by the Jesuit reductions to slave raids, as well as their high degree of autonomy and economic success, have been cited as contributing factors to the expulsion of the Jesuits from the Americas in 1767. The Jesuit reductions present a controversial chapter of the evangelisational history of the Americas, and are variously described as jungle utopias or as theocratic regimes of terror.

==== Assimilation and mestizaje ====
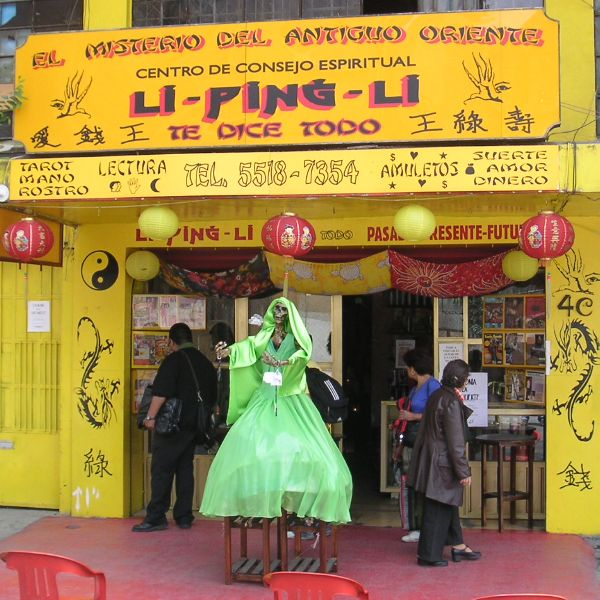
A life sized figure of Santa Muerte stands outside a fortune teller's storefront in Mexico City's Chinatown.

The conquest was immediately accompanied by evangelization, and new, local forms of Catholicism appeared. The Virgin of Guadalupe is one of Mexico's oldest religious image, and is said to have appeared to Juan Diego Cuauhtlatoatzin in 1531. News of the 1534 apparition on Tepayac Hill spread quickly through Mexico; and in the seven years that followed, 1532 through 1538, the Indian people accepted the Spaniards and 8 million people were converted to the Catholic faith. Thereafter, the Aztecs no longer practiced human sacrifice or native forms of worship. In 2001 the Italian Movement of Love Saint Juan Diego was created, and launched evangelization projects in 32 states. A year later, Juan Diego was canonized by Pope John Paul II.

Guadalupe is often considered a mixture of the cultures which blend to form Mexico, both racially and religiously Guadalupe is sometimes called the "first mestiza" or "the first Mexican". Mary O'Connor writes that Guadalupe "bring[s] together people of distinct cultural heritages, while at the same time affirming their distinctness."

One theory is that the Virgin of Guadalupe was presented to the Aztecs as a sort of "Christianized" Tonantzin, necessary for the clergymen to convert the indigenous people to their faith. As Jacques Lafaye wrote in Quetzalcoatl and Guadalupe, "...as the Christians built their first churches with the rubble and the columns of the ancient pagan temples, so they often borrowed pagan customs for their own cult purposes.

Such Virgins appeared in most of the other evangelized countries, mixing Catholicism with the local customs. The Basilica of Our Lady of Copacabana was built in Bolivia, near the Isla del Sol where the Sun God was believed to be born, in the 16th century, to commemorate the apparition of the Virgin of Copacabana. In Cuba, the Virgin named Caridad del Cobre was allegedly seen in the beginning of the 16th century, a case consigned in the Archivo General de Indias. In Brazil, Our Lady of Aparecida was declared in 1929 official Patron Saint of the country by Pope Pius XI. In Argentina, there is Our Lady of Luján. In other cases, the appearance of the Virgin was reported by an indigenous person, for example, Virgen de los Ángeles in Costa Rica.

=== Anti-Clericalism and persecutions ===
For most of the history of post-colonial Latin America, religious rights have been regularly violated, and even now, tensions and conflict in the area of religion remain. Religious human rights, in the sense of freedom to exercise and practice one's religion, are almost universally guaranteed in the laws and constitutions of Latin America today, although they are not universally observed in practice. Moreover, it has taken Latin America much longer than other parts of the West to adopt religious freedom in theory and in practice, and the habit of respect for those rights is only gradually being developed.

The slowness to embrace religious freedom in Latin America is related to its colonial heritage and to its post-colonial history. The Aztec and the Inca both made substantial use of religion to support their authority and power. This pre-existing role of religion in pre-Columbian culture made it relatively easy for the Spanish conquistadors to replace native religious structures with those of a Catholicism that was closely linked to the Spanish throne.

Anti-clericalism was an integral feature of 19th-century liberalism in Latin America. This anti-clericalism was based on the idea that the clergy (especially the prelates who ran the administrative offices of the Church) were hindering social progress in areas such as public education and economic development. The Catholic Church was one of the largest land owning groups in most of Latin America's countries. As a result, the Church tended to be rather conservative politically.

Beginning in the 1820s, a succession of liberal regimes came to power in Latin America. Some members of these liberal regimes sought to imitate the Spain of the 1830s (and revolutionary France of a half-century earlier) in expropriating the wealth of the Catholic Church, and in imitating the 18th-century benevolent despots in restricting or prohibiting the religious institutes. As a result, a number of these liberal regimes expropriated Church property and tried to bring education, marriage and burial under secular authority. The confiscation of Church properties and changes in the scope of religious liberties (in general, increasing the rights of non-Catholics and non-observant Catholics, while licensing or prohibiting the institutes) generally accompanied secularist, and later, Marxist-leaning, governmental reforms.

==== Mexico ====
The Mexican Constitution of 1824 had required the Republic to prohibit the exercise of any religion other the Roman Catholic and Apostolic faith. The Constitution of 1857 retained many of the Roman Catholic Church's Colonial era privileges and revenues, but, unlike the earlier constitution, did not mandate that the Catholic Church be the nation's exclusive religion, and strongly restricted the Church's right to own property. Such reforms were unacceptable to the leadership of the clergy and the Conservatives. Comonfort and members of his administration were excommunicated, and a revolt was then declared.

===== Reform War =====
Starting in 1855, US-backed President Benito Juárez issued decrees nationalizing church property, separating church and state, and suppressing religious institutes. Church properties were confiscated and basic civil and political rights were denied to religious institutes and the clergy. The Church supported the regime of Juárez's successor, Porfirio Diaz, who was opposed to land reform.

The first of the Liberal Reform Laws were passed in 1855. The Juárez Law, named after Benito Juárez, restricted clerical privileges, specifically the authority of Church courts, by subverting their authority to civil law. It was conceived of as a moderate measure, rather than abolish church courts altogether. However, the move opened latent divisions in the country. Archbishop Lázaro de la Garza in Mexico City condemned the Law as an attack on the Church itself, and clerics went into rebellion in the city of Puebla in 1855–56. Other laws attacked the privileges traditionally enjoyed by the military, which was significant since the military had been instrumental in putting and keeping Mexican governments in office since Emperor Agustín de Iturbide in the 1820s.

The next Reform Law was called the lerdo law, after Miguel Lerdo de Tejada. Under this new law, the government began to confiscate Church land. This proved to be considerably more controversial than the Juárez Law. The purpose of the law was to convert lands held by corporate entities such as the Church into private property, favoring those who already lived on it. It was thought that such would encourage development and the government could raise revenue by taxing the process. Lerdo de Tejada was the Minister of Finance and required that the Church sell much of its urban and rural land at reduced prices. If the Church did not comply, the government would hold public auctions. The Law also stated that the Church could not gain possession of properties in the future. However, the Lerdo Law did not apply only to the Church. It stated that no corporate body could own land. Broadly defined, this would include ejidos, or communal land owned by Indian villages. Initially, these ejidos were exempt from the law, but eventually these Indian communities suffered and extensive loss of land.

By 1857, additional anti-clerical legislation, such as the Iglesias Law (named after José María Iglesias) regulated the collection of clerical fees from the poor and prohibited clerics from charging for baptisms, marriages, or funeral services. Marriage became a civil contract, although no provision for divorce was authorized. Registry of births, marriages and deaths became a civil affair, with President Benito Juárez registering his newly born son in Veracruz. The number of religious holidays was reduced and several holidays to commemorate national events introduced. Religious celebrations outside churches was forbidden, use of church bells restricted and clerical dress was prohibited in public.

One other significant Reform Law was the Law for the Nationalization of Ecclesiastical Properties, which would eventually secularize nearly all of the country's monasteries and convents. The government had hoped that this law would bring in enough revenue to secure a loan from the United States but sales would prove disappointing from the time it was passed all the way to the early 20th century.

===== Cristero War =====
Following the revolution of 1910, the new Mexican Constitution of 1917 contained further anti-clerical provisions. Article 3 called for secular education in the schools and prohibited the Church from engaging in primary education; Article 5 outlawed monastic orders; Article 24 forbade public worship outside the confines of churches; and Article 27 placed restrictions on the right of religious organizations to hold property. Most obnoxious to Catholics was Article 130, which deprived clergy members of basic political rights. Many of these laws were resisted, leading to the Cristero Rebellion of 1927–1929. The suppression of the Church included the closing of many churches and the killing and forced marriage of priests. The persecution was most severe in Tabasco under the atheist governor Tomás Garrido Canabal.

Between 1926 and 1929 an armed conflict in the form of a popular uprising broke out against the anti-Catholic\ anti-clerical Mexican government, set off specifically by the anti-clerical provisions of the Mexican Constitution of 1917. Discontent over the provisions had been simmering for years. The conflict is known as the Cristero War. A number of articles of the 1917 Constitution were at issue. Article 5 outlawed monastic religious orders. Article 24 forbade public worship outside of church buildings, while Article 27 restricted religious organizations' rights to own property. Finally, Article 130 took away basic civil rights of members of the clergy: priests and religious leaders were prevented from wearing their habits, were denied the right to vote, and were not permitted to comment on public affairs in the press.

The Cristero War was eventually resolved diplomatically, largely with the influence of the U.S. Ambassador. The conflict claimed the lives of some 90,000: 56,882 on the federal side, 30,000 Cristeros, and numerous civilians and Cristeros who were killed in anticlerical raids after the war's end. As promised in the diplomatic resolution, the laws considered offensive to the Cristeros remained on the books, but no organized federal attempts to enforce them were put into action. Nonetheless, in several localities, persecution of Catholic priests continued based on local officials' interpretations of the law.

The effects of the war on the Church were profound. Between 1926 and 1934 at least 40 priests were killed. Between 1926 and 1934, over 3,000 priests were exiled or assassinated. In an effort to prove that "God would not defend the Church", Calles ordered "hideous desecration of churches ... there were parodies of (church) services, nuns were raped and any priests captured ... were shot ...". Calles was eventually deposed and despite the persecution, the Church in Mexico continued to grow. A 2000 census reported that 88 percent of Mexicans identify as Catholic.

Where there were 4,500 priests serving the people before the rebellion, in 1934 there were only 334 priests licensed by the government to serve fifteen million people, the rest having been eliminated by emigration, expulsion and assassination. It appears that ten states were left without any priests.

==== Ecuador ====
The tension between civilian and clerical authority dominated Ecuador's history for much of the 19th and early 20th centuries. This issue was one of the bases for the lasting dispute between Conservatives, who represented primarily the interests of the Sierra and the church, and the Liberals, who represented those of the costa and anticlericalism.

==== Colombia ====
Although Colombia enacted anticlerical legislation and its enforcement during more than three decades (1849–84), it soon restored “full liberty and independence from the civil power” to the Catholic Church.

When the Liberal Party came to power in 1930, anticlerical Liberals pushed for legislation to end Church influence in public schools. These Liberals held that the Church and its intellectual backwardness were responsible for a lack of spiritual and material progress in Colombia. Liberal-controlled local, departmental and national governments ended contracts with religious communities who operated schools in government-owned buildings, and set up secular schools in their place. These actions were sometimes violent, and were met by a strong opposition from clerics, Conservatives, and even a good number of more moderate Liberals.

La Violencia refers to an era of civil conflict in various areas of the Colombian countryside between supporters of the Colombian Liberal Party and the Colombian Conservative Party, a conflict which took place roughly from 1948 to 1958.

Across the country, militants attacked churches, convents, and monasteries, killing priests and looking for arms, since a conspiracy theory maintained that the religious had guns, and this despite the fact that not a single serviceable weapon was located in the raids.

==== Argentina ====
Liberal anti-clericalists of the 1880s established a new pattern of church-state relations in which the official constitutional status of the Church was preserved while the state assumed control of many functions formerly the province of the Church. Conservative Catholics, asserting their role as definers of national values and morality, responded in part by joining in the rightist religio-political movement known as Catholic Nationalism which formed successive opposition parties. This began a prolonged period of conflict between church and state that persisted until the 1940s when the Church enjoyed a restoration of its former status under the presidency of Colonel Juan Perón. Perón claimed that Peronism was the "true embodiment of Catholic social teaching" - indeed, more the embodiment of Catholicism than the Catholic Church itself.

In 1954, Perón reversed the fortunes of the church by threatening total disestablishment and retracting critical functions, including the teaching of religious education in public schools. As a result, Argentina saw extensive destruction of churches, denunciations of clergy and confiscation of Catholic schools as Perón attempted to extend state control over national institutions.

The renewed rupture in church-state relations was completed when Perón was excommunicated. However, in 1955, overthrown by a military general who was a leading member of the Catholic Nationalist movement.

In 1983, the civilian president, Raúl Alfonsín, attempted to restore a liberal democratic state. Alfonsín's opposition to the church-military alliance, conjoined with his strongly secular emphasis contravening traditional Catholic positions, incited opposition that served to curtail his agenda.

==== Cuba ====
Cuba, under atheist Fidel Castro, succeeded in reducing the Church's ability to work by deporting the archbishop and 150 Spanish priests, discriminating against Catholics in public life and education and refusing to accept them as members of the Communist Party. The subsequent flight of 300,000 people from the island also helped to diminish the Church there. In later year Fidel Castro converted back to Catholicism and lifted the ban on the catholic church in Cuba

=== Since the Second Vatican Council ===
The Catholic Church in Latin America has played an important part in the life of the worldwide church since the Council, including providing two Popes, Pope Francis, who came from Argentina, and Pope Leo XIV, who ministered in Peru. The Conferences of the Latin American Bishops held in Medellín (1968), Puebla (1979), Santo Domingo (1992) and Aparecida (2007) have been seen as "significant events for the life of the church as a whole".

==== Liberation theology ====
In the 1960s, growing social awareness and politicization in the Latin American Church gave birth to liberation theology which openly supported anti-imperialist movements.

The Peruvian priest, Gustavo Gutiérrez, became its primary proponent and, in 1979, the bishops' conference in Mexico officially declared the Latin American Church's "preferential option for the poor". Archbishop Óscar Romero, a supporter of the movement, became the region's most famous contemporary martyr in 1980, when he was murdered while saying mass by forces allied with the government. Both Pope John Paul II and Pope Benedict XVI (as Cardinal Ratzinger) denounced the movement. The Brazilian theologian Leonardo Boff was twice ordered to cease publishing and teaching. While Pope John Paul II was criticized for his severity in dealing with proponents of the movement, he maintained that the Church, in its efforts to champion the poor, should not do so by resorting to violence or partisan politics. The movement is still alive in Latin America today, though the Church now faces the challenge of Pentecostal revival in much of the region.

== See also ==
- Catholic Church in Argentina
- Catholic Church in Bolivia
- Catholic Church in Brazil
- Catholic Church in Chile
- Catholic Church in Colombia
- Catholic Church in Costa Rica
- Catholic Church in Cuba
- Catholic Church in the Dominican Republic
- Catholic Church in Ecuador
- Catholic Church in El Salvador
- Catholic Church in Guatemala
- Catholic Church in Honduras
- Catholic Church in Mexico
- Catholic Church in Nicaragua
- Catholic Church in Panama
- Catholic Church in Paraguay
- Catholic Church in Peru
- Catholic Church in Puerto Rico
- Catholic Church in Uruguay
- Catholic Church in Venezuela
