= History of the Catholic Church in Brazil =

This article details the history of the Catholic Church in Brazil from the colonial era until the modern era. The Federative Republic of Brazil is the largest country in South America. It is the world's fifth largest country, both by geographical area and by population with over 201 million people. Catholicism is the country's predominant faith with approximately 64.6% of the population identifying as a member of the religion. Brazil has the world's largest Catholic population.

The history of the Catholic Church in Brazil begins with the region's colonization by the Portuguese. Jesuits played an important role in the early colonies before eventually being expelled. The Catholic Church supported Brazilian independence and worked to secure its place within the country. The republican government of the 1890s implemented a greater emphasis on the separation of church and state but the 20th century saw a flourishing of membership due to mass immigration. The church made attempts at this time to expand their cultural presence through various methods, including advocacy. Today, the Catholic Church in Brazil continues to work towards advocacy.

== Colonial era, 1500–1822 ==
When the Portuguese claimed Brazil in 1500, the Portuguese crown already exercised the power of patronage of ecclesiastical appointments (Padroado real), by which the papacy ceded control over naming clerics to vacant benefices, but did not cede it in matters of dogma. This was similar to the Patronato real that the crown of Castile exercised over clerical appointments in its overseas empire. "The right of nomination [of a candidate] is the very essence of patronage."

It is said that the first colonists celebrated in Brazil was on Christmas Sunday in the year 1500 by a priest in the party who claimed possession for Portugal. The members of the Society of Jesus, the first of the religious orders to arrive in Brazil, accompanied the 1549 expedition of Tomé de Sousa, the first governor-general of Brazil.

Catholicism was an inherent element of Portuguese settlement in Brazil, but the church as an organization was weak. At the time, the church did not feel the need to act independently from the state and therefore relied on state structures rather than creating its own.

The church was a physical presence. With the establishment of Portuguese towns and cities, construction of churches and the cathedral of the seat of a diocese was a priority. Although the first church buildings were made with materials at hand, the construction of more opulent edifices soon followed, with decorative tiles and even some stone were imported. During Brazil's first export boom of cane sugar in the sixteenth and seventeenth centuries, Portuguese settlements grew and the churches were a locus of local pride.

Tomé de Sousa, first Governor General of Brazil, brought the first group of Jesuits to the colony. The Jesuits represented the spiritual side of the enterprise and were destined to play a central role in the colonial history of Brazil. Spreading the Catholic faith was an important justification for Portuguese conquests and the Jesuits were officially supported by the King, who instructed Tomé de Sousa to give them all the support needed to Christianise the indigenous peoples.

The first Jesuits, guided by Father Manuel da Nóbrega and prominent figures such as Juan de Azpilcueta Navarro, Leonardo Nunes, and, later, José de Anchieta, established the first Jesuit missions in Salvador and São Paulo dos Campos de Piratininga, which was the settlement that gave rise to the city of São Paulo. Nóbrega and Anchieta were instrumental in the defeat of the French colonists of the France Antarctique by managing to pacify the Tamoio natives. The Jesuits took part in the foundation of the city of Rio de Janeiro in 1565.

The success of the Jesuits in converting the indigenous peoples to Catholicism is linked to their capacity to understand the native culture, especially the language. The first grammar of the Tupi language was compiled by José de Anchieta and printed in Coimbra in 1595. The Jesuits often gathered the aborigines in communities (the Jesuit Reductions) where the natives worked for the community and were evangelised.

The Catholic Church showed notable progress in the colonial period, especially 1680–1750, even though hampered by government policy. The church and government had contrary goals as regarding the Amazon Indians, whom the government was exploiting and reducing to slavery.

The Jesuits had frequent disputes with other colonists who wanted to enslave the natives. The action of the Jesuits saved many natives from slavery but also disturbed their ancestral way of life and inadvertently helped spread infectious diseases against which the aborigines had no natural defenses. Slave labor and trade were essential for the economy of Brazil and other American colonies, and the Jesuits usually did not object the enslavement of African peoples.

In 1782, the Marquis of Pombal instituted a series of reforms in Portugal and its overseas possessions, which included the Suppression of the Society of Jesus as well as the expulsion of other missionaries. Pombal was an advocate of monarchical power over the church, often known as regalism, and state autonomy from the papacy, or Gallicanism (after the model in France). The Brazilian church held little power and thus was in no position to protest.

== Empire of Brazil, 1822–1889 ==
The Catholic hierarchy supported the 1822 independence of Brazil, but were opposed to a republican form of government, a model followed by most of the former Spanish American colonies. The transition to independence in Brazil was made easier and less divisive than in Spanish America, since a member of the royal Braganza family became the Brazilian monarch. According to one account, a churchman was the first to publicly "proclaim Pedro king of Brazil". A constitution was drafted in 1823 following independence with quite liberal protections for non-Catholic religions, although privileging the Catholic Church to be the State religion "above all others and the only one maintained by it". This draft constitution was not accepted by the Brazilian monarch, but the religious provisions of the charter his handpicked committee drafted were similar to those of the 1823 draft constitution. Tolerance of other faiths was established in the official document with the right to public and private exercise beliefs, but non-Catholic places of worship could not have the appearance of a church. In practice this meant non-Catholic houses of worship could not have spires or bells.

Since the Portuguese crown had exercised the power of patronage of vacant ecclesiastical posts of the Catholic church, the Brazilian monarch did as well. Additionally, they collected the tithe on behalf of the Catholic Church and turned over the proceeds to it. This union of religion and politics with Catholic clerics was supported with revenues paid to the state. The Catholic Church remained in charge of education and held jurisdiction over marriage and burial grounds. However, in early independent Brazil in many other matters, "religious toleration was fully tested and found to be a living letter". Catholicism was the only recognized church, and it was supported by the States. Other religions were tolerated, but Catholicism was the official church.

A conflict in the early 1870s between the church and the Emperor about the place of Freemasons, known as the Religious Issue, was responsible for a substantial weakening in the Empire's political stability.

== Republic ==
After the Revolution of 1889 and the creation of the republic, a Constituent Congress was called to assemble in November 1890. The provisional government drafted a constitution that laid out its vision of church-state relations in the new republic and incorporated portions of the decrees that government had issued prior to the congress. In January 1890, the Provisional Government had issued a decree proclaiming the separation of Church and State, guaranteeing freedom of worship, and declaring that no church thereafter should be subsidized by the government, nor in any way receive support either from the federal government or from those of the individual States. By the terms of this decree public officials were forbidden to interfere in any way with the formation of religious societies, and it was declared to be unlawful to stir up religious dissension among the people. Every religious body was at liberty to worship according to its own rites, while each individual could live according to his belief, and unite in societies with others, and build churches if he chose. The salaries of those in the service of the church were ordered to be discontinued at the expiration of a year.

Separation of church and state did, however, leave in place the church's ownership of its "buildings, lands, incomes, and hierarchical organization". The existing churchyards were secularized, and the question of the establishment of new cemeteries was left in the hands of individual communities. Religious bodies, however, could choose separate burial places, though always subject to the laws. The existing religious holidays, except Sunday, were abolished by another decree, and nine new ones established commemorating secular events. Later, a civil marriage law was passed, somewhat resembling those of the United States and France, and also a divorce law. This latter, however, bore the stamp of the religious training of the people, for by its terms, neither party was permitted to marry again during the life of the other.

The Catholic Church was not entirely opposed to the separation of church and state, since under the Brazilian monarchy had increasingly controlled the church.

== The Brazilian Catholic Church in the 20th Century ==
During the first half of the 20th century the Catholic Church in Brazil had a huge expansion in number of faithful due to the mass immigration of migrants from Catholic countries such as Portugal, Spain, Italy, Germany, Austria, and Poland. Moreover, there were countless conversions of immigrants from other non-Catholic areas, such as Japan and the Middle East. In 1923, Domingos Chohachi Nakamura was the first Japanese missionary to move to Brazil to work on behalf of the non-Catholic Japanese living in southeast Brazil.

In an attempt to grow the Catholic Church's presence in Brazilian culture, the church supported the construction of Christ the Redeemer in Rio de Janeiro on top of Corcovado Mountain in the 1920s and 30s. Also during this time, the church advocated and succeeded in making Our Lady of Aparecida the patron saint of Brazil in 1929, thus securing the country as a pilgrimage location.

The weakness and small size of the Catholic Church following the establishment of the republic meant, in practice, a paucity of priests for the country's huge population, religious competition from other religions, especially mainline Protestant churches but also nascent Pentecostal Protestantism, as well as secularization of Brazilian society and the rise of secular or atheist political movements. Brazil became a destination for Protestant missionaries who proselytized and set up religious schools. After World War II, there were additional non-Catholic groups in Brazil, including the Church of Jesus Christ of the Latter-day Saints, Pentecostals, Jehovah's Witnesses, and the Four Square Gospel.

The Brazilian Catholic bishops sought ways to regain strength and counter growing secularism and loss of Catholic parishioners in Brazil and established the organization of the Brazilian Bishops Conference, with Dom Hélder Câmara taking a leading role. Secular left-wing political movements and secularization of society, along with the growth of Protestantism and other competing faiths, instilled a sense of urgency for Brazilian Catholic bishops to be proactive. The Conference also aimed to increase outreach to the poor and make liturgy more accessible.

The 1959 Cuban Revolution had a significant impact on all of Latin America and on the Catholic Church, since it was explicitly atheist and Marxist in orientation and provided a model for other Latin American leftist revolutionaries to emulate. Pope John XXIII's call for a Second Vatican Council brought together Catholic clerics and instituted significant changes in the Catholic Church to increase the role of the laity, foster a less hierarchical church, and instill the need for social justice set off activity in Latin America as a whole and Brazil in particular. The Latin American Catholic Church became far more socially active.

Increasing involvement in the education of elites led to the emergence of new and politically diverse movements among the laity, while attempts to assert more orthodox Catholicism among marginalized peoples increased awareness of the plight of peasants and Indians among the lower clergy and some bishops. Many clergy members and lay leaders thus supported the attempts at social and political reform that took place during the post-Vargas Republic. However, growing unrest and fear of Communism led the church hierarchy to endorse the military coup of 1964. Still, a few bishops and numerous priests, particularly in the poorer regions, strongly criticized the military government's economic policies and human rights record. During the violence following the coup, several priests were murdered, and one bishop was kidnapped and beaten which added further concern over the government's human rights violations.

During the 1970s, the Catholic Church emerged as a key pro-democracy voice within civil society. Ecclesiastical Base Communities (CEBs), small groups of believers who focused on linking grassroots religious and secular change, spread throughout the countryside. These became the foundations of the so-called "popular church", which assertively advocated social justice and became increasingly influential within the church. The goal of these communities was to connect with the poor. Established mainly in the 1970s, these communities aimed to look at the socioeconomic reasons for poverty before turning to Christianity and prayer for answers. Their ideology was based in Christian socialism. However, their value on literacy and intellectual ideas alienated poor Brazilians and made the communities largely unsuccessful. The movement has also been criticized for focusing on a larger picture and discounting the role of individuals. The liberation theology in which these communities were based did not match the needs of the individuals it aimed to aid. Adding onto their difficulty in establishing strong communities was a lack of support from Pope John Paul II due to his suspicions of communist-based ideology. While the movement was largely a failure, at its highest point, there were around 80,000 Christian Based Communities. The communities began to decline in the 1980s and 90s.

By 1979, the Brazilian Church was the most progressive in Latin America, while managing to avoid many of the confrontations between radicals and conservatives that wracked other churches in the region.

== Present day ==
In the 20th century, such controversial issues as theological liberalism and the question of the mixing of Catholic ritual with rites from other sources continued to provoke much discussion within the church.

=== Theological Liberalism ===
Today, the Catholic Church in Brazil largely focuses on human rights, advocating for the poor. In 2000, the church held a referendum that asked how Brazilians felt about the conditions placed by the International Monetary Fund (IMF). It found that 95% of respondents were against the conditions. The results of this referendum assisted the Cardoso administration in negotiating a better agreement. The Catholic Church also advocates to raise awareness for social issues like drug abuse, racial discrimination, and childhood homelessness.

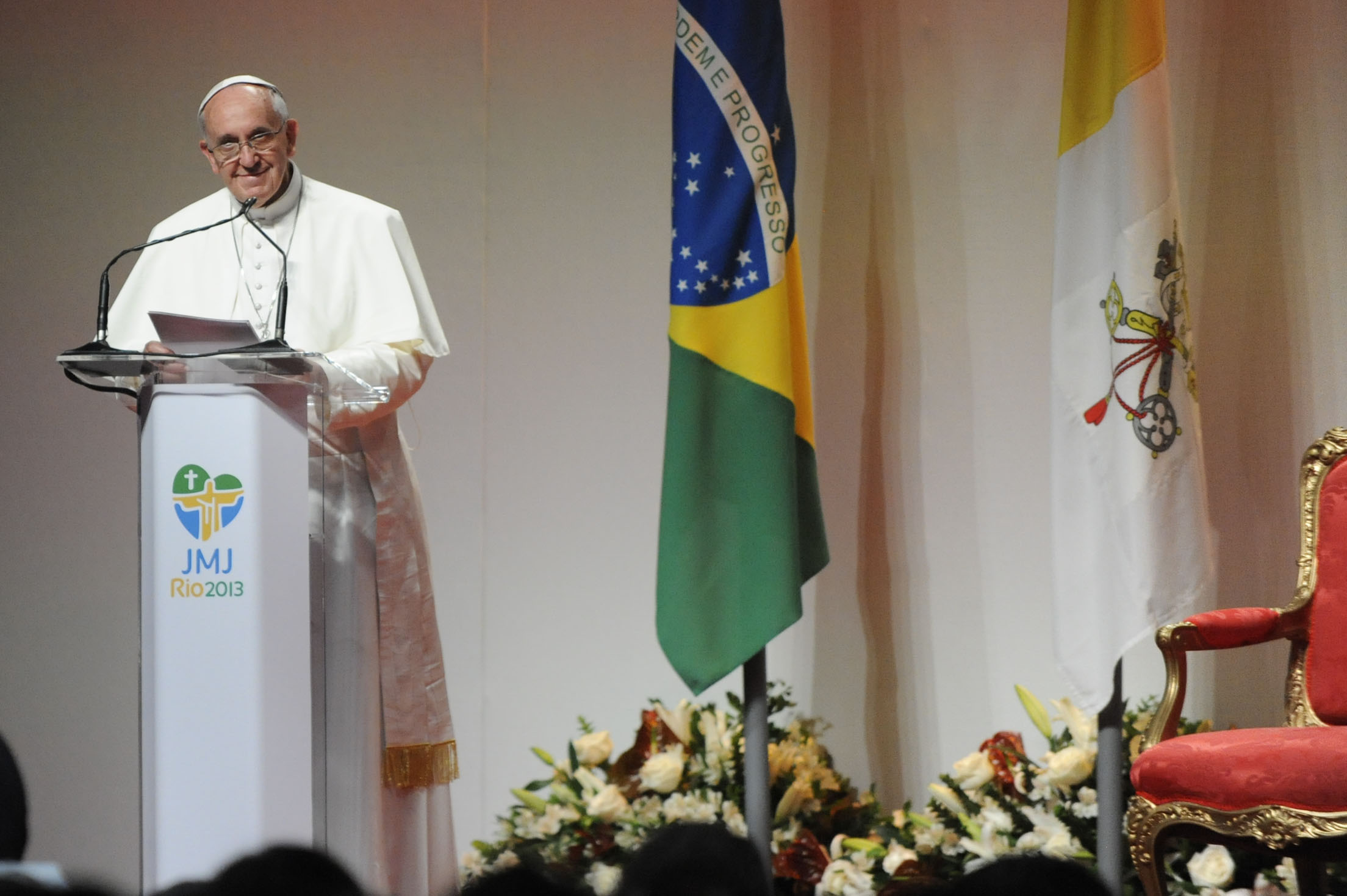
An image from Pope Francis's 2013 visit to Brazil

Despite their advocacy, the Catholic Church still must compete with Neo-Pentecostal Protestant churches, who in recent years, have seen much growth in these populations. Catholicism remains the predominant religion of the country, with 64.6% identifying as Catholic, 22.2% of the country identifies as Protestant. Between 2000 and 2010, the percentage of Catholics in Brazil dropped from 74% to 65%. The Catholic Church's struggles to connect with poor populations in Brazil is partially a result of conservative leadership under Pope John Paul II. Suspicious of communist-based ideology, the Pope did not support the Christian Based Communities that arose in Brazil. In 2013, Pope Francis visited Brazil where he attempted to reverse some of the conservative policy of the previous decade and promote a more liberal policy that encouraged change.

=== Conflict Between the Catholic Church and Candomblé Practice ===
The connections between Catholicism and Candomblé, practiced by Afro-Brazilians, has faced a number of discussions surrounding its relationship to Catholic practices. These discussions have led to the anti-syncretism movement, which seeks to separate Candomblé and Catholic practices. For some, this separation is out of a desire for African authenticity in Brazil. Not all support this separation, instead believing that Candomblé and Catholicism can both be practiced by a single individual as the two serve different aspects for the practitioner.

Groups that incorporate Candomblé have developed around the celebration of certain Catholic traditions. One such group is the Sisterhood of Our Lady of the Good Death (Irmandade de Nossa Senhora da Boa Morte) who celebrate the Feast of the Assumption of the Virgin Mary. Tensions between the group, sometimes known more simply as Boa Morte, rose during the 1990s when the Catholic Church and sisterhood had a dispute over access to sacred items held by the church. Boa Morte was able to provide documentation that they held ownership of the items and courts ruled in their favor twice. However, Cardinal Dom Lucas ordered that no priest could participate in the celebration. In 1999, when Cardinal Dom Lucas returned to the Vatican, Boa Morte and the church began to celebrate the festival together again.

== See also ==
- Papal visits to Brazil
