= List of papal visits to Brazil =

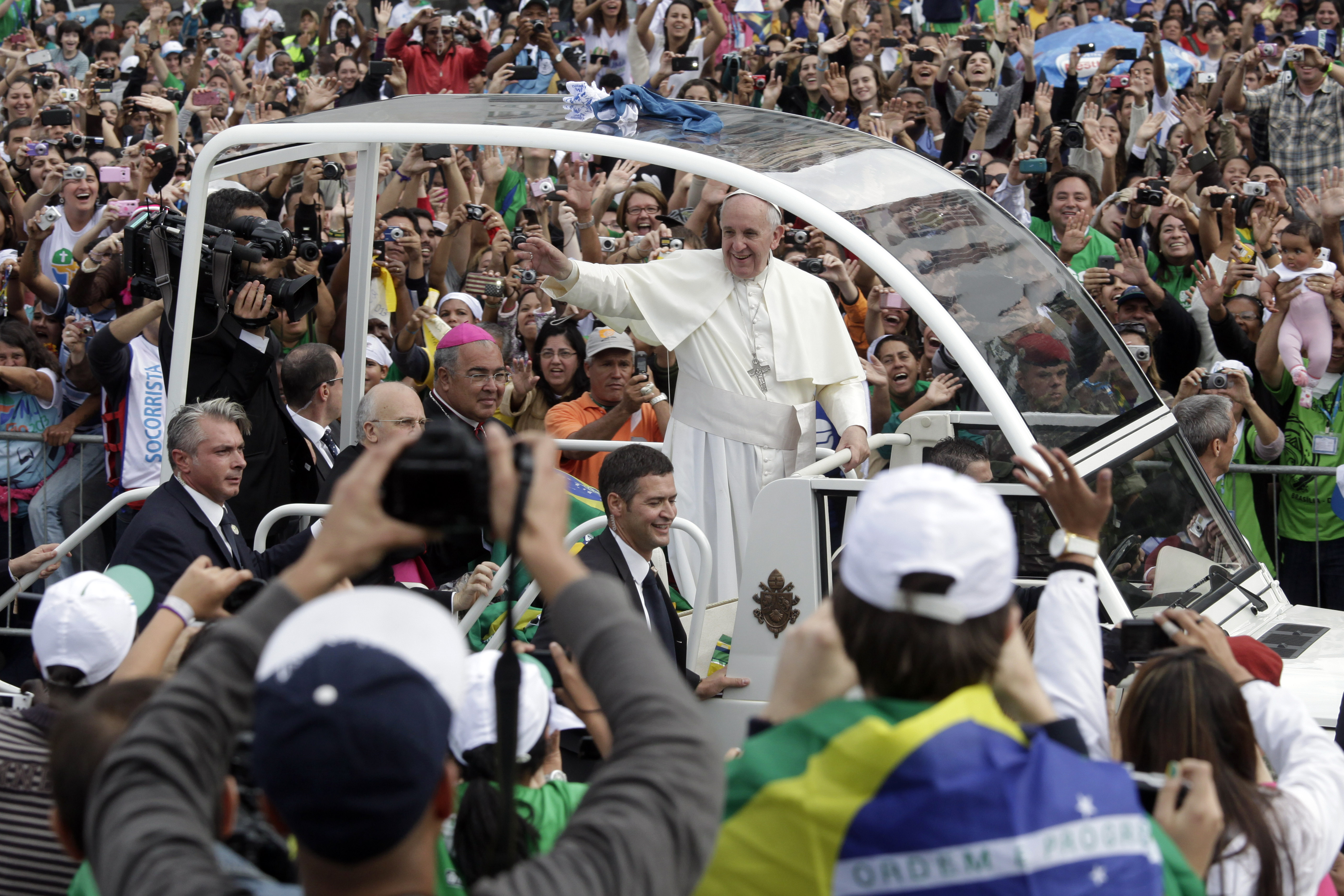
Pope Francis during his 2013 visit to the country

Papal visits to Brazil have been made by three popes—John Paul II, Benedict XVI, and Francis. The first trip was taken in 1980 and the most recent was in 2013. There have been a total of six trips, with John Paul II having taken four (in 1980, 1982, 1991, and 1997) and both Benedict XVI and Francis making a single trip during their papacy (in 2007 and 2013, respectively).

== Visits to Brazil by reigning popes ==
=== Pope John Paul II ===
==== 1980 visit ====
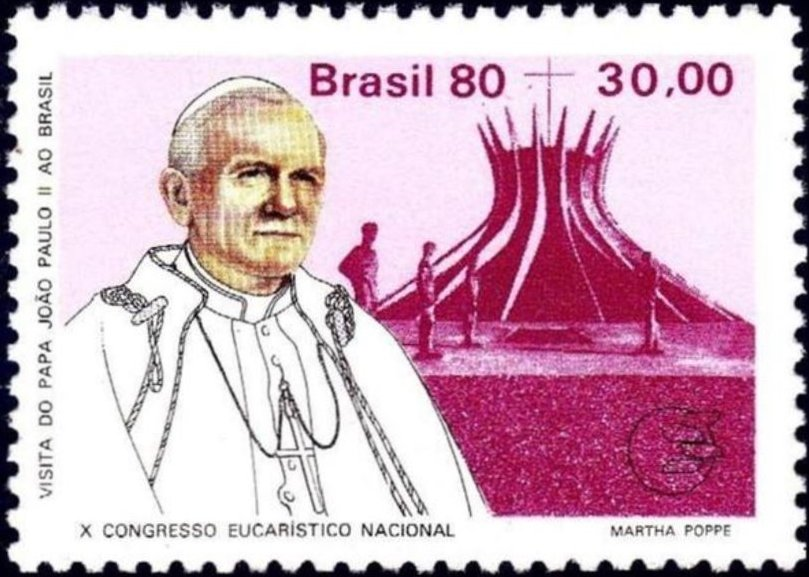
Stamp commemorating the 1980 visit of Pope John Paul II, featuring the Cathedral of Brasília

On January 30, 1980, the Holy See announced that Pope John Paul II would visit Brazil in July. The trip would mark the first visit of a pope to the country, which at the time had more Catholics than any other country. Of the country's 120 million people, approximately 95 percent had been baptized into the Catholic Church. However, according to James Nelson Goodsell of The Christian Science Monitor, the church had "struggled for years with tepid support" from the population, with over half of all people being uninvolved in Catholicism. The trip was expected to last 12 days, which would mark the longest time spent by a pope in a single country outside of Italy in the modern era. Additionally, the pope was expected to travel extensively through the country, covering an estimated 10,000 miles (16,000 kilometres).

At the time, the Catholic Church in Brazil was largely split into different camps led by conservative, moderate, and progressive bishops. The progressive wing in particular was considered a loud critic of the military dictatorship that was ruling the country, having lent its support to an illegal general strike of metalworkers in April 1980 and advocating for land reform that ran counter to the government's policies. In June 1980, pro-dictatorship Senator Jarbas Passarinho accused the church of advocating for the overthrow of the government. Against this backdrop, progressives in the country were hopeful that the pope would voice some support for their liberation theology. Per Goodsell, this social activism had caused a recent revival of general support for the church. Charles A. Krause, writing for The Washington Post, said that, "Although on past trips to Africa and Mexico he has weighed his words carefully when talking about the church's ministry to the poor, observers believe that he may be unable to avoid taking a stand during his 12 days in Brazil."

The pope arrived in Brazil on Monday, June 30, landing in the capital city of Brasília. Journalist Robin Wright, who accompanied the pope during the trip, reported that all Catholic churches rang their bells in unison upon radio announcement of his landing. For the duration of the trip, the pope tried to speak Portuguese. Vehicles for his trip were provided by the federal government. According to Krause, the pope was also given "free access" to the country's radio and television.

During the trip, the pope visited the cities of Belo Horizonte, Rio de Janeiro, and São Paulo in the Southeast Region, Belém, Recife, and Salvador in the Northeast Region, and Brasília and Manaus in the country's interior. Throughout the trip, the pope highlighted the church's social activism, especially with regards to helping the poor, and used the trip to promote social justice. In Manaus, the pope advocated for increased land rights for indigenous peoples in Brazil. During a visit to a parish church in the Vidigal favela in Rio de Janeiro, John Paul II made a surprise gift to the church by giving them a gold ring that had been gifted to him by his predecessor, Pope Paul VI, after his elevation to the rank of cardinal. At the church, where he met with several hundred local residents, he said, "A society that is not socially just, and does not intend to be, puts its own future in danger" and that "[t]he Church wants to be the church of the poor".

In several public appearances, he expressed his disagreement with some of the policies of the federal government. In São Paulo, he addressed a group of over 100,000 union workers, shouting "Solidarnosc! Solidarnosc!" with a raised fist, in reference to the anti-authoritarian Polish labor union. He stated that "Power must never be used to protect the interests of one group against another" and that the principles of Christianity required "freeing the world from domination of an oppressing order". According to Wright, the speech "was an invocation to act against Brazil’s military dictatorship". In Recife, he urged the government to give land to the poor, saying, "It is unacceptable that the general development of a society should exclude men and women of the field, precisely those who are ready to work it with their own hands and who need it to feed themselves." The trip ended on 11 July, following a sightseeing trip to the Amazon River. In total, John paul II traveled approximately 17,500 miles (28,200 km) across the country during his 12-day stay.

==== 1982 visit ====
On 11 June 1982, during a trip to Argentina, John Paul II had a layover at the Rio de Janeiro/Galeão International Airport. During this short visit, he made a speech at the airport.

==== 1991 visit ====
On 12 October 1991, the pope arrived in Natal, Rio Grande do Norte, for a 10-day trip across Brazil, during which time he was expecting to visit 10 cities. Going into the trip, The New York Times reported that the pope was expected to address a number of issues affecting both the church and the general population, including social inequality and the growth in popularity of both Protestant denominations and African diaspora religions. On his first day of the trip, he addressed the former by saying that there existed "perverse economic imbalances that carry with them intolerable individual and social discrimination". Concerning the latter, he attributed the issue primarily to the number of Catholic priests in the country, which he called "insufficient". Between the pope's 1980 trip and his 1991 return, it was estimated that several million baptized Catholics in Brazil had converted to Protestantism. Per United Press International, he was additionally expected to address violence against indigenous people and the deforestation of the Amazon rainforest.

Upon arrival in Natal, he was greeted by Minister of Foreign Affairs Francisco Rezek on behalf of President Fernando Collor de Mello. This was his first visit to the country since Brazil's redemocratization in 1985, which saw democratic elections for the first time since the 1964 Brazilian coup d'état. Shortly after his arrival, he was greeted by a crowd of about 300,000 in Congress Square and addressed the 10,000 participants of the 12th National Eucharistic Congress. The following day, he conducted an open-air Mass in which approximately 100,000 people participated. During the event, the pope attacked some evangelical Protestant denominations as offering people "false mirages" and of spreading "false images" and "distorted simplifications". Later that day, he oversaw the closing of the eucharistic congress before flying to São Luís, Maranhão. On 16 October, he presided over a Mass in Cuiabá where he asked for forgiveness from indigenous Brazilians for the "weakness and defects" of some Catholic missionaries, but defended the Catholic Church for its contributions to South American society. The pope departed from Brazil on 21 October, with his last stop before returning to Rome being the city of Salvador.

In a 2017 article published in the American Economic Journal, academics Vittorio Bassi and Imran Rasul hypothesized that the pope's visit may have been responsible for a miniature baby boom in Brazil, pointing out that several of the pope's speeches included multiple discussions of marriage, family, and children. Summarizing their findings, Chris Fleisher of the American Economic Association wrote, "The authors found that the Pope’s visit reduced individual intentions to use contraception by more than 40 percent and increased the frequency of unprotected sex by 30 percent. Sure enough, nine months later, there was a corresponding 1.6 percent increase in births."

==== 1997 visit ====
On 2 October 1997, John Paul II arrived in Brazil for a four-day stay in the country. The primary purpose of his visitation was to attend the World Meeting of Families, which was being attended by about 2,500 other bishops. On 4 October, he met with President Fernando Henrique Cardoso at the Laranjeiras Palace in Rio de Janeiro. Earlier in the year, Cardoso had been the first president in Brazilian history to visit the pope in Vatican City. Prior to his arrival at the palace, he made an unannounced stop in the Sumaré favela of Rio de Janeiro, where several thousand people lined the road to see him. In order to protect the pope, roughly 26,000 detectives, soldiers, and military police officers had been stationed in favelas. Later that day, he presided over a Mass for about 5,000 people in the Rio de Janeiro Cathedral and, later, met with families at Maracanã Stadium. On 5 October, at Flamengo Park, he celebrated a Solemn Mass that was attended by an estimated 1.5 million people. During his time in Brazil, the pope's messaging largely focused on the family, which included opposition to abortion and same-sex marriage.

=== Pope Benedict XVI ===
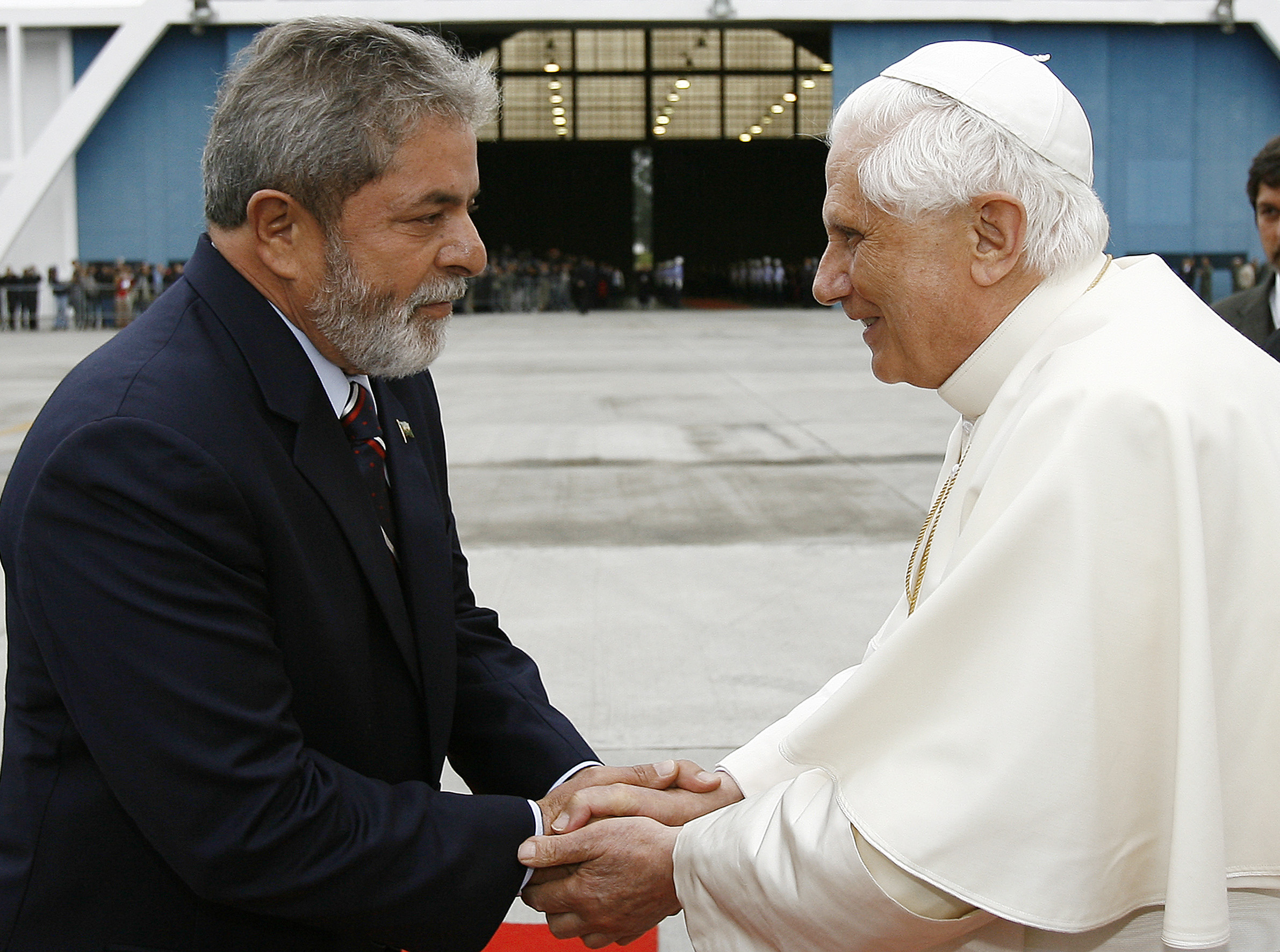
Pope Benedict XVI (right) with President Luiz Inácio Lula da Silva in 2007

Pope Benedict XVI visited the country in 2007, arriving at the São Paulo/Guarulhos International Airport on 9 May. The primary purpose of his trip was to preside over the opening of the Fifth Episcopal Conference of Latin America in Aparecida. However, per the Pew Research Center, a major aim of the pope's trip was to combat the rise of Pentecostalism in the country. At the time, the country still boasted the largest Catholic population in the world, but as a percentage of the population, that number had declined. Additional goals expressed by the pope himself included combatting abortion and promoting welfare to the poor. The trip was Benedict's first to the Western Hemisphere as pope, a position he had been elected to just two years prior.

Upon his arrival at the airport, he was greeted by President Luiz Inácio Lula da Silva. While an outdoor ceremony was planned for his arrival, rain caused the ceremony to be moved indoors. Afterwards, the pope traveled via popemobile to the Mosteiro de São Bento, which hosted him during his time in the city. On 12 May, he departed the city for Aparecida.

On 13 May, he presided over the opening of the conference, which was held at the Basilica of Our Lady of Aparecida. During the ceremony, the pope attacked legislation that allowed for abortion and contraceptives, saying that they were "threatening the future of peoples", and additionally denounced both capitalism and Marxism as "systems that marginalize God". He also promoted what Ian Fisher and Larry Rohter of The New York Times said "amounted to a revisionist history" of the origins of Catholicism in Latin America, saying, "In effect, the proclamation of Jesus and of his Gospel did not at any point involve an alienation of the pre-Columbus cultures, nor was it the imposition of a foreign culture". He further argued against the incorporation of indigenous cultural practices into Catholic religious practices, which some Latin American clergy members had been advocating for.

Benedict departed from São Paulo to Rome later that day via Alitalia. He later discussed his trip in a speech given to several thousand spectators at St. Peter's Square on 23 May.

=== Pope Francis ===
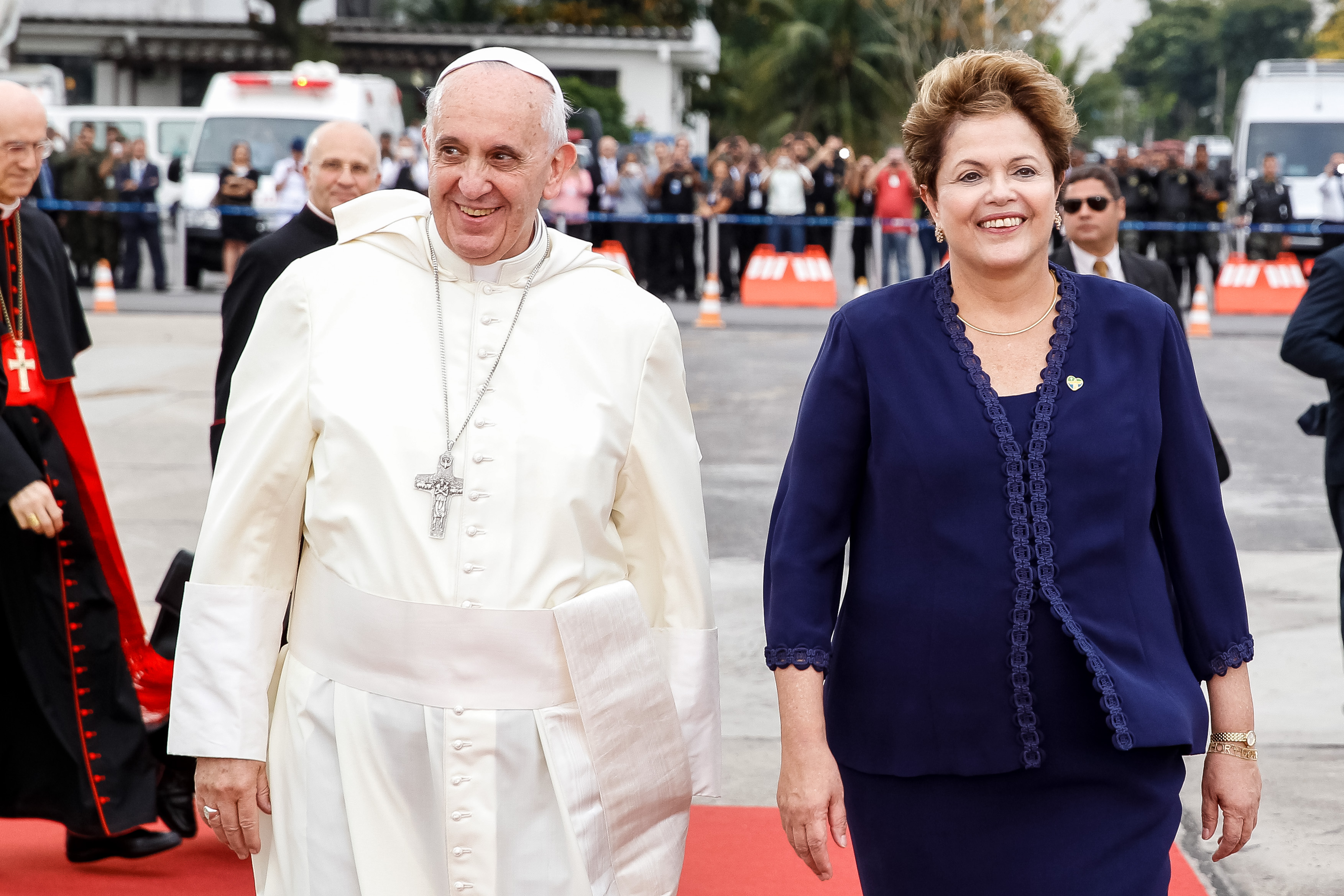
Pope Francis (left) with President Dilma Rousseff in 2013

Pope Francis traveled to Brazil on 22 July 2013 in order to celebrate that year's World Youth Day. It was his first international trip since becoming pope. He arrived in the country via the Rio de Janeiro/Galeão International Airport in Rio de Janeiro, where he was greeted by President Dilma Rousseff. Following his arrival, he gave a speech at the Guanabara Palace. He stayed at the Sumaré residence in Rio de Janeiro, which was also the residence of John Paul II during two of his visits to the country. During his visit, he held a papal Mass in Guaratiba, a neighborhood in the western part of the city. On 28 July, he oversaw a Mass on Copacabana Beach that was attended by approximately 3 million people. He departed Brazil later that evening.

== See also ==
- Brazil–Holy See relations
- Catholic Church in Brazil
- History of the Catholic Church in Brazil
- Papal travel
