= SERESURE =

The Seminario Regional del Sureste (known as its abbreviation SERESURE or simply the Seminary of the Southeast) was a training center for future Latin-American Catholic priests with a tendency toward liberation theology and ended up being the principal hotbed for this group of Catholics who sought the integration of priests into the modern world by helping the poor, the indigenous, and the dispossessed, opposing the clerical tradition of finding alliances in pre-existing circles of power. In SERESURE, which was located in the city of Tehuacán in Puebla, Mexico, various Catholic prelates and priests were trained, not just from Mexico, but from all of Latin America. The seminary was founded in 1969 by the initiative of several bishops toward the southeastern and pacific sections of the country, and stayed open until 1990, the year in which it was closed for good on the orders of Noberto Rivera Carrera, who considered it a Marxist institution opposed to the dogmatic teachings of the Catholic Church.

== Creation ==
Major bishops involved in the founding of the seminary were Liberationist theologians, such as the Bishop of Cuernavaca Sergio Méndez Arceo, the Bishop of Tehuantepec Arturo Lona Reyes, the Archbishop of Oaxaca Bortolomé Carrasco Briseño and the Bishop of San Cristóbal de Las Casas Samuel Ruiz. All of these figures faced persecution from the nuncio Girolamo Prigione which had helped motivate SERESURE's formation.

== Close relations with the indigenous population ==
In its 21 years of existence, SERESURE trained almost 750 students in 18 dioceses and two religious orders (the Dominicans and the Jesuits). Of these 750,488 were later ordained as priests. The dioceses that managed to obtain freshly ordained priest from this seminary were largely in the Pacific South region (Chiapas and Oaxaca), in which the dioceses of Tehuacán, Acapulco, Ciudad Altamirano, and Quetzaltenango, Guatemala were integrated. The seminary hosted seven major conferences about indigenous pastoralism, where many indigenous people of various ethnic groups in Mexico participated, allowing liberationists to encounter indigenous beliefs, culture, and theology, a topic that was also taught in the seminary. There were also a group of indigenous seminarians that held meetings apart from others in order to formulate a theology that agreed more with their cultural customs.

== Closing ==
The tendency for the Mexican Catholic Church in the 1980s to pay particular attention to the poor and the indigenous deeply unnerved middle and upper class Catholics as well as the upper echelons of the Catholic clergy, the latter of whom were organized into various elite catholic organizations who saw SERESURE's teachings as having a Marxist and Communist character, schools of thought which were poorly perceived by both the Mexican government and the Papacy.

Riding on this sentiment, Pope John Paul II, with the assistance of the nuncio Girolamo Prigione, initiated the dismantlement of SERESURE, decreeing that the only direction the seminary should take was that which followed wishes of the bishop of the diocese rather than the original founders of the seminary. While this in and of itself would not have doomed the seminary, the appointment of the conservative Norberto Rivera Carrera, who had already demonstrated his capacity to reprimand or even restrict lower class movements in his native Durango, to the position of bishop of Tehuacán in 1985 meant that the figure the pope had decreed would be in charge of the direction of the seminary would be one directly opposed to its very interests.

The ensuing policies which diverged from previously common study programs and fieldwork to focus rote classroom work like other seminaries provoked the mobilization of seminarians and teachers like, who made a peaceful pilgrimage to the Cathedral of Tehuacán where they began a day of prayer and fasting in its atrium until the doors were closed on them. As a result of these actions that would end up having national ramifications, Rivera Carrera fired a slew of teachers and nearly every bishop took themselves and their most prominent seminaries to other dioceses. When all was said and done, just 5 seminarians remained tolerating the new draconian regulations of Rivera. It was these remaining members of finally dissolved the seminary in 1990. The Vatican rewarded Rivera Carrera's actions by appointing him as Archbishop of Mexico City in 1995.

== Reunions after closure ==
Annual meetings of the priests who had left the seminary at the time of its demise continued until at least 2009, led by the bishop emeritus of Tehuantepec, Arturo Lona, in Tehuacán. In these reunions, the priests returned to their alma mater, even if the institution itself no longer existed. The diocese has opposed these nostalgic reunions, moving them to different venues within the city of Puebla.
