= Latin American and Caribbean Episcopal Council =

Catholic territorial administrative unit

The Latin American and Caribbean Episcopal Council (Spanish: Consejo Episcopal Latinoamericano y Caribeño; Portuguese: Conselho Episcopal Latino-Americano e Caribenho), better known as CELAM, is a council of the Catholic bishops in Latin America, created in 1955 in Rio de Janeiro, Brazil. It is based in Bogotá, Colombia.

== Early history ==
From July 25 to August 4,1955, bishops from all over Latin America met in Rio de Janeiro, Brazil, for the first meeting of CELAM, with Pope Pius XII formally approving the organization on November 2 of that year. The bishops that met for the 1955 General Conference highlighted three main problems the church faced in Latin America: shortage of clergy, lack of organization, and pressing social issues - calling for an increase in social work by the Church. Concerns including the rise of communism, secularism, and Protestantism were also included in the plenary meeting. Overall, the organization was created to support the pastoral work of the bishops, and to respond to problems facing the Church in Latin America. Bishops with diverging politics, such as Hélder Câmara and Jaime de Barros Câmara, helped form the organization and its mission.

CELAM expanded rapidly in the 60s and experienced a demographic change in the mid-60s. From 1959 to 1964, under Miguel Darío Miranda y Gómez as president, the organization had two sub-departments -- Catechetics and the Committee on Faith. By 1965, with Manuel Larraín as president, the organization operated with nine: Education, Lay Apostolates, Liturgy, Pastoral of CELAM, Public Opinion, Semiñaries, University Pastoral, Vocations and Ministries, and Social Action. Four new institutes were also created by CELAM under the leadership of Manuel Larraín: the Institute of Pastoral Liturgy and the Pastoral Institute for Latin America in Quito, Ecuador, the Institute on Latin American Catechetics in Santiago, Chile, and the Institute on Latin American Catechetics in Manizales, Colombia. Progressive bishops and their staff quickly filled the newly created positions, making CELAM a successful vehicle for Liberation theology, as the organization provided necessary support and protection for the movement to grow.

The Second Vatican Council (1962-65) prompted the Second Episcopal Conference of Latin America, also referred to as the Medellín Conference or CELAM II, that took place in Medellín, Colombia, from August 24 to September 6, 1968. The meeting was convened to discuss the implications of Vatican II on the Latin American Church. The Conference included six preparatory meetings, with attendees such as Gustavo Gutiérrez, Juan Luis Segundo, and José Comblin. Documents from the conference declare the Church committed to social change towards "authentic liberation", Latin America suffering under "neocolonialism" and "the international imperialism of money", and claim that the "growing distortion of international commerce [is] … a permanent menace against peace". The guidelines of Medellín contributed to the development of a more vigorous Church, committed explicitly to social justice, which was reflected in CELAM's propagation of Ecclesial Base Communities - local groups that reinterpreted the biblical message, giving it a clear political content to put it at the service of popular struggles - as well as in the organization's extensive educational work focused on social issues provided to clergy, laity, and congregants of the Church. The conference is credited for propelling the movement of Liberation theology forward, with "organizational strength" in the Latin American Church's progressive sector considered to be at an all time high from 1968 to 1972.

== Conflict over liberation theology ==
Supported by CELAM, liberation theology was historically met with skepticism by the Vatican and Pope Paul VI. Cardinal Antonio Samoré, in charge of relations between the Roman Curia and the CELAM as the leader of the Pontifical Commission for Latin America, was ordered to put a term to this orientation.

With Alfonso López Trujillo's election in 1972 as general secretary of CELAM, conservatives gained control of this organization, at much the same time as they were beginning to regain control of the Roman Curia. Considered a papabile at the 2005 Papal conclave, López Trujillo stayed CELAM's general secretary until 1984. However, at the 1979 CELAM Conference in Puebla, Mexico, over three months after the election of Karol Wojtyla as Pope John Paul II, conservative reorientation of the CELAM was met by strong opposition from the progressive part of the clergy, which defined the concept of a "preferential option for the poor". However, the pope would go on to use the phrase in his 1987 encyclical Sollicitudo rei socialis. In 1984 and 1986, the Holy See twice condemned elements of liberation theology, especially Marxist elements, but did not strictly condemn it on the whole.

== Present programs ==
CELAM currently supports programs like AVAAZ and TECHO to help eliminate rights abuses and extreme poverty around the world. CELAM also supports a Christian radio station and television station. There are CELAM-sponsored child and youth programs to help young people in the church. CELAM has also been vocal in its support for peace in the Colombian conflict and a ceasefire between the government forces and the FARC.

Cardinal Óscar Andrés Rodríguez Maradiaga (Archbishop of Tegucigalpa) was CELAM's general secretary from 1995 to 1999, along with Cardinal Luis Aponte Martínez (Archbishop of San Juan).

== Present leadership ==
- President: Archbishop Miguel Cabrejos Vidarte (2019 - 2023), Metropolitan Archbishop of Trujillo, Peru
- First Vice-President: Cardinal Odilo Pedro Scherer (2019 - 2023), Metropolitan Archbishop of São Paulo, Brazil
- Second Vice-President: Cardinal Leopoldo José Brenes Solórzano (2019 - 2023), Metropolitan Archbishop of Managua, Nicaragua
- General Secretary: Bishop Juan Carlos Cárdenas Toro (2019 - 2023), Auxiliary Bishop of Cali, Colombia

== Past leadership ==
- President: Cardinal Rubén Salazar Gómez (2015 - 2019), Metropolitan Archbishop of Bogotá, Colombia
- First Vice-President: Bishop Carlos María Collazzi Irazábal (2015 - 2019), Bishop of Mercedes, Uruguay
- Second Vice-President: Archbishop José Belisário da Silva (2015 – 2019), Metropolitan Archbishop of São Luís do Maranhão, Brazil
- General Secretary: Bishop Juan Espinoza Jiménez (2015 - 2019), Auxiliary Bishop of Morelia, Mexico

== Member Conferences ==
- Antilles Episcopal Conference
- Episcopal Conference of Argentina
- Episcopal Conference of Bolivia
- Episcopal Conference of Brazil
- Episcopal Conference of Chile
- Episcopal Conference of Colombia
- Conference of Catholic Bishops of Cuba
- Ecuatorian Episcopal Conference
- Episcopal Conference of El Salvador
- Episcopal Conference of Guatemala
- Conference of the Dominican Episcopate
- Episcopal Conference of Puerto Rico
- Episcopal Conference of Haiti
- Episcopal Conference of Honduras
- Conference of the Mexican Episcopate
- Episcopal Conference of Nicaragua
- Episcopal Conference of Panama
- Peruvian Episcopal Conference
- Episcopal Conference of Uruguay
- Venezuelan Episcopal Conference

== See also ==
- Fifth Episcopal Conference of Latin America
- Second Episcopal Conference of Latin America
- Synod of Bishops for the Pan-Amazon region
