= Juan Luis Segundo =

Uruguayan theologian, physician and priest (1925–1996)

Juan Luis Segundo SJ (March 31, 1925, in Montevideo, Uruguay – January 17, 1996, in Montevideo) was a Uruguayan theologian and Jesuit priest who was an important figure in the movement known as Latin American liberation theology. He wrote numerous books on theology, ideology, faith, hermeneutics, and social justice, and was an outspoken critic of what he perceived as Church callousness toward oppression and suffering. He was a physician by training.

== Biography ==
In 1941, he joined the Society of Jesus and studied at Jesuit seminaries at Córdoba and the Seminary of San Miguel, both in Argentina, and later at the Faculty of Theology San Alberto in Leuven, Belgium (where he met fellow student Gustavo Gutiérrez). He was ordained in 1955. He obtained his licentiate in 1958, with his thesis "La Cristiandad, una utopía?" ("Christianity, a utopia?") Between 1958 and 1963 he studied for the Doctorat d'Etat in the Faculty of Letters of the Sorbonne, from which he received his doctorate. His thesis was titled "Berdiaeff, una reflexión cristiana sobre la persona." ("Berdyaev, a Christian reflection on the person.")

He returned to Uruguay and in Montevideo he started "Cursos de Complementación Cristiana", in which he analysed political, social and economic problems in the light of Catholic faith. He gave these courses between 1961 and 1964, at the same time he did other work in the continent, collaborating in Chile with Roger Vekemans in political typology in his "Ensayo de tipología socioeconómica latinoamericana" ("Essay on Latin-American Socioeconomic Typology") and with Renato Poblete in the "Ensayo de tipología política de América Latina" ("Essay on Political Typology of Latin America," published by OEA in Washington in 1961). In 1965, he co-founded the Peter Faber Center of Theological and Social Studies (Centro de Investigación y Acción Social "Pedro Fabro"), which was closed by the Uruguayan government in the 1970s. The Center dedicated itself to investigating the interrelations between society and religion. Some work was published in the review, Perspectivas de Diálogo. With his experience in the Center, Segundo wrote his fundamental work, Teología abierta para el laico adulto, (Open Theology for the Lay Adult) in five volumes, published in Argentina by the Editorial Carlos Lohlé.

After that, he traveled, lectured and taught at universities in Brazil, Canada, and the United States. In 1970 he met in Petrópolis, Brazil, other Latin American theologians who started the Theology of Liberation. Together with the Peruvian theologian Gustavo Gutiérrez, Segundo was one of the founders of the movement. In fact, his prominent book The Liberation of Theology, was a series of lectures that took place in 1974 at Harvard Divinity School. In 1974 he had the distinction of "Best Book in 1974 Liturgy" of the Catholic Press Association of New York for The Sacraments Today, vol. 4 of A Theology for Artisans of a New Humanity.

== Works ==
His major works (translated into English from the original Spanish) include:

- Pre-Christian Stages of Faith (1962)
- The Christian Understanding of Humanity (1962)
- Berdiaeff. Une Réflexion chrétienne sur la Personne. Ed. Aubier, Paris 1963 (Col. Théologie 53)
- A Theology for Artisans of a New Humanity (5 vols., 1973–74) (Teología abierta para el laico adulto. Ed. Carlos Lohlé, Buenos Aires, in collaboration with the Centro Pedro Fabro of Montevideo.)
- The Liberation of Theology (1975–76)
- Hidden Motives of Pastoral Action: Latin American Reflections (English edition, 1978)
- Jesus of Nazareth Yesterday and Today (5 vols., 1982–88; volume 1, Faith and Ideologies, is the best known)
- Theology and the Church: a response to Cardinal Ratzinger and a Warning to the Whole Church (1985)
- The Liberation of Dogma (1989–1992)

== Sources ==
- Kim, Hyung-Kon, "Juan Luis Segundo," The Boston Collaborative Encyclopedia of Modern Western Theology, 1999
