= Fifth Episcopal Conference of Latin America =

The Fifth Episcopal Conference of Latin America and the Caribbean, or "Conference of Aparecida", was an episcopal conference of the Catholic Church in Latin America. It took place in 2007 in Aparecida, Brazil. Cardinal Jorge Bergoglio, later Pope Francis, took a prominent role.

== Proceedings ==
The Conference was convened by Pope John Paul II and specified by Pope Benedict XVI. It was organized by the Latin American Episcopal Council (CELAM), under the guidance of the Pontifical Commission for Latin America. The regulation of the Fifth Conference was approved on 8 April 2006. The conference used a tool wiki for the preparation of texts for discussion.

The Conference was opened by Benedict XVI in Aparecida on 13 May and ended on 31 May 2007. The theme of the Fifth Conference was: "Disciples and Missionaries of Jesus Christ so that our peoples may have life in Him", inspired by a passage from the Gospel of John, who narrates "I am the Way, the Truth and the Life" (John 14:6).

At the Aparecida Conference, Cardinal Jorge Bergoglio – later Pope Francis – was elected by his brother bishops to chair the important committee charged with drafting the final document.

== Previous conferences ==
The preceding conferences of CELAM were:

- Rio de Janeiro, Brazil (25 July to 4 August 1955)
- Medellín, Colombia (28 August to 6 September 1968)
- Puebla, Mexico (27 January to 13 February 1979)
- Santo Domingo, Dominican Republic (12 to 28 October 1992), coinciding with a commemoration of the five hundred year presence of the gospel in the Americas.

== See also ==
- Basilica of the National Shrine of Our Lady of Aparecida
- Papal visits to Brazil
