= Second Episcopal Conference of Latin America =

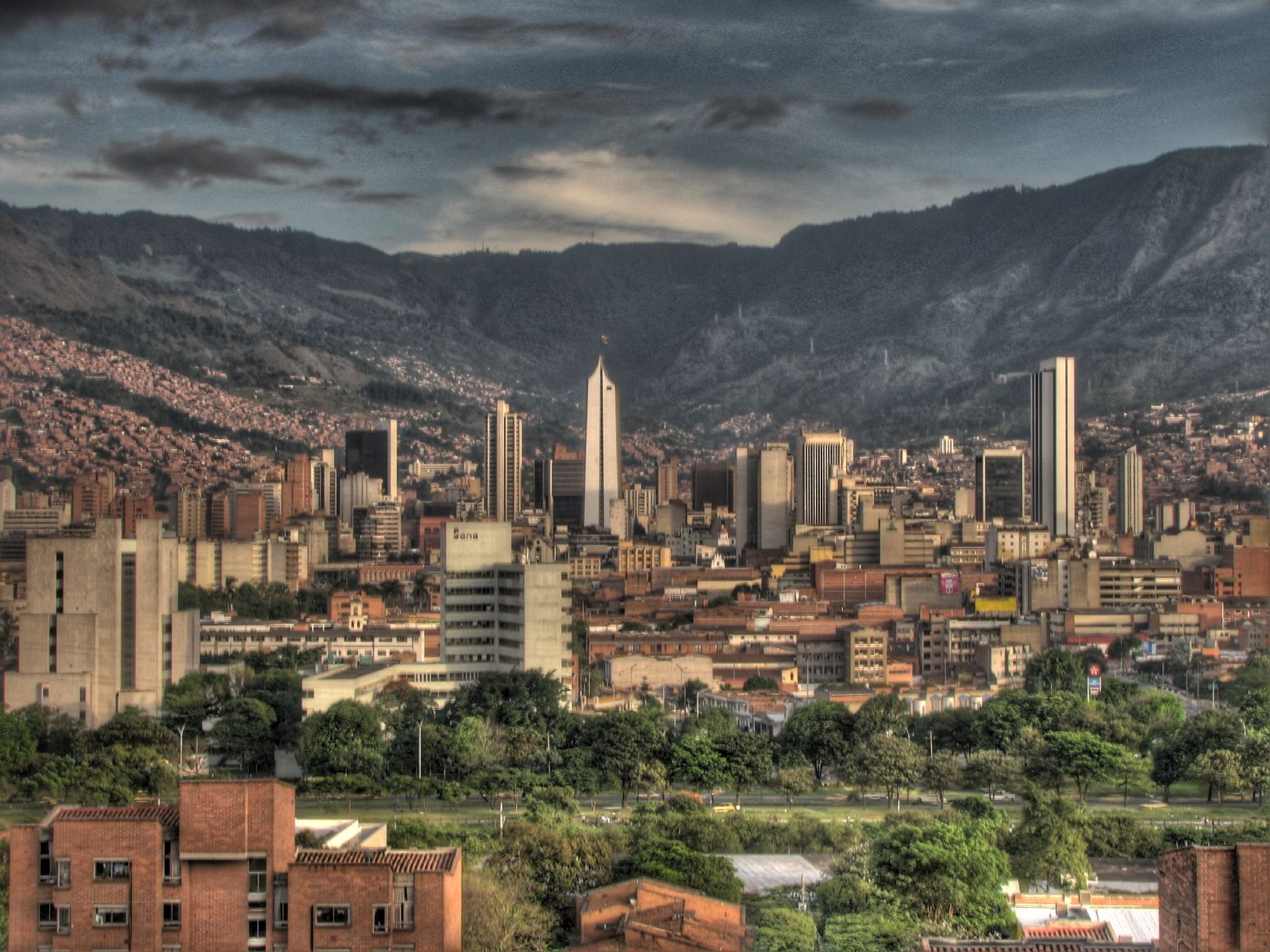
Medellin, Colombia; where the Conference took place in 1968.

The Second Episcopal Conference of Latin America was a bishops' conference held in 1968 in Medellín, Colombia, as a follow-up to the Second Vatican Council which it adapted in a creative way to the Latin American context. It took as the theme for its 16 documents “The Church in the Present Transformation of Latin America in the Light of the Council", with a focus on the poor and oppressed in society. It recognized that “the social situation demands an efficacious presence of the Church that goes beyond the promotion of personal holiness by preaching and the sacraments.” The bishops agreed that the church should take "a preferential option for the poor" and gave their approval to Christian "base communities" in which the poor might learn to read by reading the Bible. The goal of the bishops was to liberate the people from the "institutionalized violence" of poverty. They maintained that poverty and hunger were preventable.

== History ==
In 1931, Pope Pius XI had put forward a vague plan for a sort of moderate corporatism. However, he also pushed for both Catholic and secular labor unions. Though these unions were likely more akin to medieval guilds in the Pope's vision, unions at this time were beginning to be associated with workers' rights and class struggles. By the 1950s and 1960s, Christian Democratic parties and Catholic labor associations were on the rise. Members were tasked with bringing Christian values and principles into public life. Papal teachings emphasized the "re-Christianizing" of society based on cooperation for the common good. While the Christian Democratic Parties began advertising their "Third Way" as an alternative to both capitalism and socialism, a divide formed within the Christian Democratic Parties between the "liberationists" and the moderate conservatives who were in control. The Latin American Episcopal Council (Spanish: Consejo Episcopal Latinoamericano), also known as CELAM, organized the conference in Medellin in order to give direction to the Church in Latin America. In an introductory statement the bishops wrote:

The difficult progress towards development and integration [in Latin America] could become an important catalyst in the process of unification to which the whole human race is converging today. ...The upheaval we are experiencing demands new attitudes of us so that we can carry through an urgent, global and profound reform of structures.

The reform movement drew on the influence of Paulo Freire, widely regarded as the greatest literacy teacher of the region, along with Father Camilo Torres and Bartolomé de Las Casas. It allowed for the poor to object to the hegemony and hierarchy they had been subjected to for the past centuries. Instead of accepting only what they were given, the people could now demand more, like soup kitchens, day care, co-ops, neighborhood organizations, higher wages, better medical care, and greater self-respect. The bishops and religious sisters who took part in this effort were hoping that the "religious fervor" of the region would help make the result extremely powerful. They rejected for Latin America the model of development imposed by international organizations along with the national governments and economically powerful groups. The poor were to become active agents in the political and economic spheres. Bishop Dom Hélder Câmara called for a "structural revolution" which would allow for integral development and the full flourishing of every human person. Pope Paul VI had spoken of "just insurrection" and the possible use of violent rebellion in certain situations.

The Medellin Conference in 1968 opened the way for the development of liberation theology, and endorsed the formation of base communities under lay leaders approved by the pastor. As base communities greatly multiplied, critics would complain of Marxist ideology and propensity toward violent confrontation. In 1978 Pope John Paul II, a staunch opponent of Communism in his native Poland, diminished the influence of liberation theology by appointing in Latin America only conservative bishops. Joseph Cardinal Ratzinger, later Pope Benedict XVI, as Prefect of the Congregation for the Doctrine of the Faith, was in charge of enforcing doctrine which largely opposed the theological interpretations and actions of the liberationists. In 1983 the Pope visited Nicaragua and expressed his belief that there is a fundamental difference between Catholic and Sandinista ideology, something which they vehemently deny.

== Tension in Medellin documents ==
It was common to see the contradictory nature of the documents from the 1968 conference as the new liberationist movement overtaking the older, developmentalist thought which has been described as follows:

What is understood as "development" contains as well a strong element of quasi-corporatist thought. A tempering of "excessive inequalities between poor and rich" is to be accomplished by the integration of all into the running of businesses through intermediate structures. Structures such as peasants' and workers' unions are to be thought of in terms of representation and participation in businesses. "All of the sectors of society, but in this case, principally the social-economic sphere, should, because of justice and brotherhood, transcend antagonisms in order to become agents of national and continental development" (Justice, 13).

In contrast to this, the liberationist model denounces the political-economic model now in place as "institutionalized violence", which must be "conquer[ed] by means of a dynamic action of awakening (concientización) and organization of the popular sectors" (Peace, 16, 18).The more conservative bishops at Medellin continued to see themselves as the protectors of the masses, while the poor masses were being encouraged to become literate and take control of their own destiny. Such literacy and mass action was fostered by the publication in Brazil of Paulo Friere's Pedagogy of the Oppressed, and given support in the Council's document on education (8).

Gustavo Gutiérrez, the author of A Theology of Liberation (1973), sees the tension in the documents of Medellin as arising in the bishops' attempt to reach all Latin American communities, no matter where they stood, and begin introducing more liberationist views.

== See also ==
- Latin American liberation theology
- Latin American Episcopal Conference (CELAM)
- Fifth Episcopal Conference of Latin America
