= Sertanejo Day =

Annual traditional Brazilian event

The Dia do Sertanejo (Portuguese: Sertanejo Day) is a traditional Brazilian event held annually by Radio Aparecida on May 3 as a tribute to Sertanejo, with the custom of "violeiros" (people playing viola caipira) visiting Aparecida, São Paulo, participating in masses, and playing music. However, the event was discontinued in 2018, after 55 years, with only historical tributes and dedicated moments during radio programming. The original idea was adapted to a television version, the Patroness's Land program, on the radio's sister channel.

== History ==
In 196 caravans began coming to Aparecida, and the "violeiros" participated in the celebrations at least once every two years.

Geraldo Meireles considered the "Marshal of música sertaneja", along with Tonico and Tinoco, as Galvão and other artists from the sertanejo raiz, had the idea to create a special day for sertanejos singers. The first events took place in the Cine Aparecida, and later moved to the underground of the National Shrine. The "May 3" date was known as the Dia do Sertanejo (English: "Sertanejo Day"), coined by the faith and perseverance of the violeiros who came every year to the Marian capital of Brazil to thank Our Lady for the work done during the year. Radio Aparecida, who accepted and encouraged those who played viola, at the time was directed by Father Ruben Leme Galvão.

== See also ==
- Rede Aparecida
- Música sertaneja
- Viola
