= Berta Celeste Homem de Melo =

Brazilian writer and poet (1902–1999)

- Born: March 21, 1902; Pindamonhangaba, Brazil
- Died: August 16, 1999 (aged 97); Jacareí, Brazil
- Resting place: Pindamonhangaba, Brazil
- Occupations: Pharmacist, teacher, writer, poet
- Spouse: Lorival Homem de Melo
- Children: Lorice Homem de Melo
- Writing career
- Pen name: Léa Guimarães
- Language: Portuguese
- Notable work: Parabéns a Você

Berta Celeste Homem de Melo (March 21, 1902 – August 16, 1999) was a Brazilian pharmacist, writer and poet. Known for writing the Portuguese language lyrics for the birthday song Parabéns a Você.

== Early life ==
Berta was born on March 21, 1902, in Pindamonhangaba, São Paulo, Brazil. She was the only child of farming couple José Joaquim and Maria da Conceição Varela Homem de Melo. She married her cousin, Lorival Homem de Melo, and had a daughter, Lorice.

She graduated as a pharmacist and lent her name to a local pharmacy, but she did not work there. Instead she led the life of a housewife, listening to the radio and writing poems in her spare time. She would often enter radio competitions, creating rhymes for various products, winning cash and merchandise, including for floor wax, toothpaste, medicine, and tea.

== Parabéns a Você ==
In 1942 the singer Almirante (Henrique Foréis Domingues), a Rádio Tupi presenter in Rio de Janeiro, launched a competition to select Portuguese lyrics to the melody of "Happy Birthday to You". Berta entered this contest using the pseudonym of 'Léa Guimarães', and her rhyme was selected as the winner from 5000 entries.

Berta has been quoted as saying that she was never happy with the way that her lyrics were sung. She would be irritated when Brazilians sing Parabéns 'pra' Você, and the plural form of the third line.

== Later life ==
In 1956, Berta moved to the city of Jacareí to become a teacher. She received a doctorate in Literature and wrote a collection of poems that were later published in a book called Devaneios. One of her songs, entitled Arraiá, was recorded by the singer Rolando Boldrin.

Berta has said that she was moved on several occasions when the lyrics to Parabéns a Você were sung, especially during the Fourth Centenary of the city of São Paulo celebrations and during a visit by Pope John Paul II in 1980, to the city of Aparecida. On September 12, 1998, she was given the title of Cidadã Jacareiense (honorary citizen of Jacareí) by the city of Jacareí.

Berta died in Jacareí on August 16, 1999, at the age of 97, from pneumonia, and was buried in Pindamonhangaba.
