= Vítor Coelho =

Brazilian priest and Venerable

Venerable Vítor Coelho de Almeida CSsR
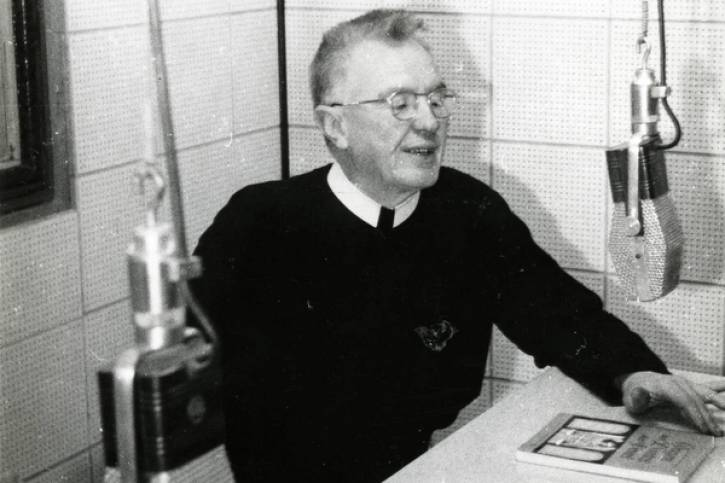
- Coelho at Rádio Aparecida
- Born: September 22, 1899; Sacramento, Minas Gerais, Brazil
- Died: July 21, 1987 (aged 87); Aparecida, Brazil

Vítor Coelho de Almeida (Sacramento, Minas Gerais, 22 September 1899 – Aparecida, 21 July 1987), better known as Padre Vítor Coelho, was a Brazilian Redemptorist priest and catechist. He was most famous for his preaching methods and his devotion to the patron saint of Brazil, Our Lady of Aparecida.

His beatification process has been opened in 1998.

== Biography ==
Vítor Coelho de Almeida was born in Sacramento, Minas Gerais, son of Leão Coelho de Almeida, a teacher, and Maria Sebastiana Alves Moreira. After losing his mother when at seven years old, he began to live with his grandmother of his mother's side, and later with his uncle Vítor, a catholic canon, at Rio de Janeiro, while his father worked as an elementary school teacher.

At 1911, Vítor entered the Colégio Santo Afonso, a catholic boarding school at Aparecida. The future priest's uncle enrolled his nephew at Santo Afonso with the goal to control his indisciplinated and insubordinate attitude. Even after Vítor clearly said that he didn't want to become a priest, Fr. João Batista, the school's director, accepted him anyway.

Later, Vítor almost left the seminary, but declared his perseverance based on Our Lady of Aparecida:

At times, I went through strong temptations against my vocation. In such moments, to avoid taking a false step, I turned to Our Lady, entrusted my vocation to her hands, and everything would pass.

— Vitor Coelho de Almeida

He exerced the novitiate of the Redemptorists at 1917 at Perdões, making his vows on August 2, 1918. Vítor initiated his studies in Philosophy at Aparecida, finishing them at Gars, Germany in 1920 and dedicating himself to Theology soon after. His theological studies were shaken in 1921, after contracting tuberculosis for the first time. He later finished them after his recover. In 1923, Vítor was ordained and celebrated his first Mass at Forcheim.

Vítor Coelho dedicated years of his life to cathechesis via radio, becoming "radio-apostle" of the ZYL-6 radio, situated in the city of Campos do Jordão, and the Rádio Aparecida, where he was active for 36 years, from 1951 until his death.

During the military dictatorship in Brazil, the radio network was censored by the government for 24 hours for supposed "subversive content". The content in question was a reading of the Universal Declaration of Human Rights by Coelho, who was the network's director at the time.

The priest died on 21 July 1987 at the city of Aparecida, victim of a pulmonary edema. He was 87 years old. Initially buried at the Redeptorist Memorial Chapel at Aparecida, his remains were moved in July 2023 to the interior of the chapel dedicated to Saint Joseph at the Basilica of Our Lady of Aparecida, in occasion of the 12th romaria realized in the priests' homenage.

== Beatification ==
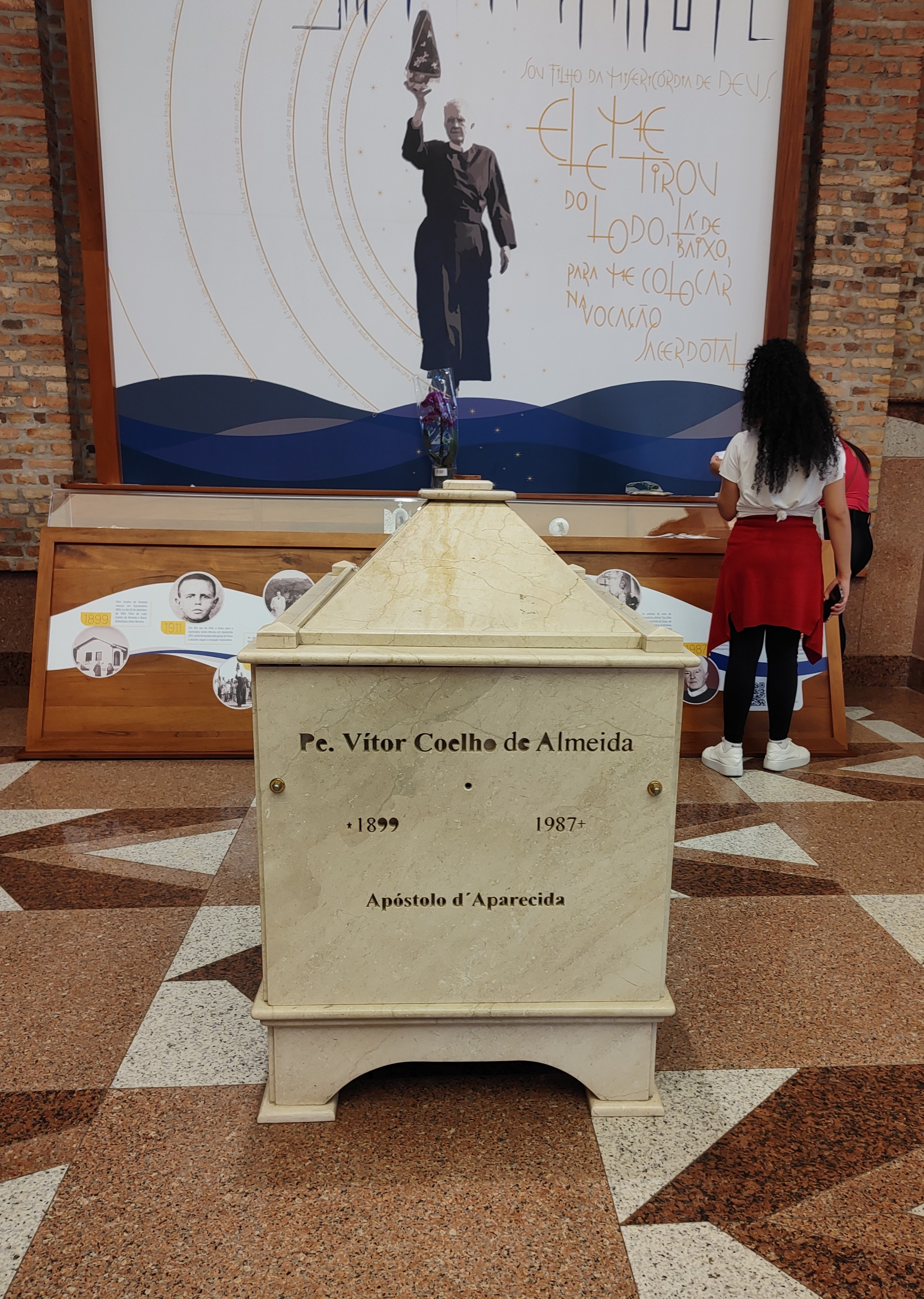
Tomb of the venerable Vitor Coelho in the Basilica of Our Lady of Aparecida

In 1998, eleven years after his death, his beatification process began. In 2006, the diocesan phase of the process was finished, with many documents and a detailed research about his life, works and legacy being sent to the Dicastery for the Causes of Saints.

In 2022, Pope Francis declared Father Vítor venerable.

== See also ==
- Roman Catholicism in Brazil
