= Pindamonhangaba =

- Municipality
- Município de Pindamonhangaba; Municipality of Pindamonhangaba
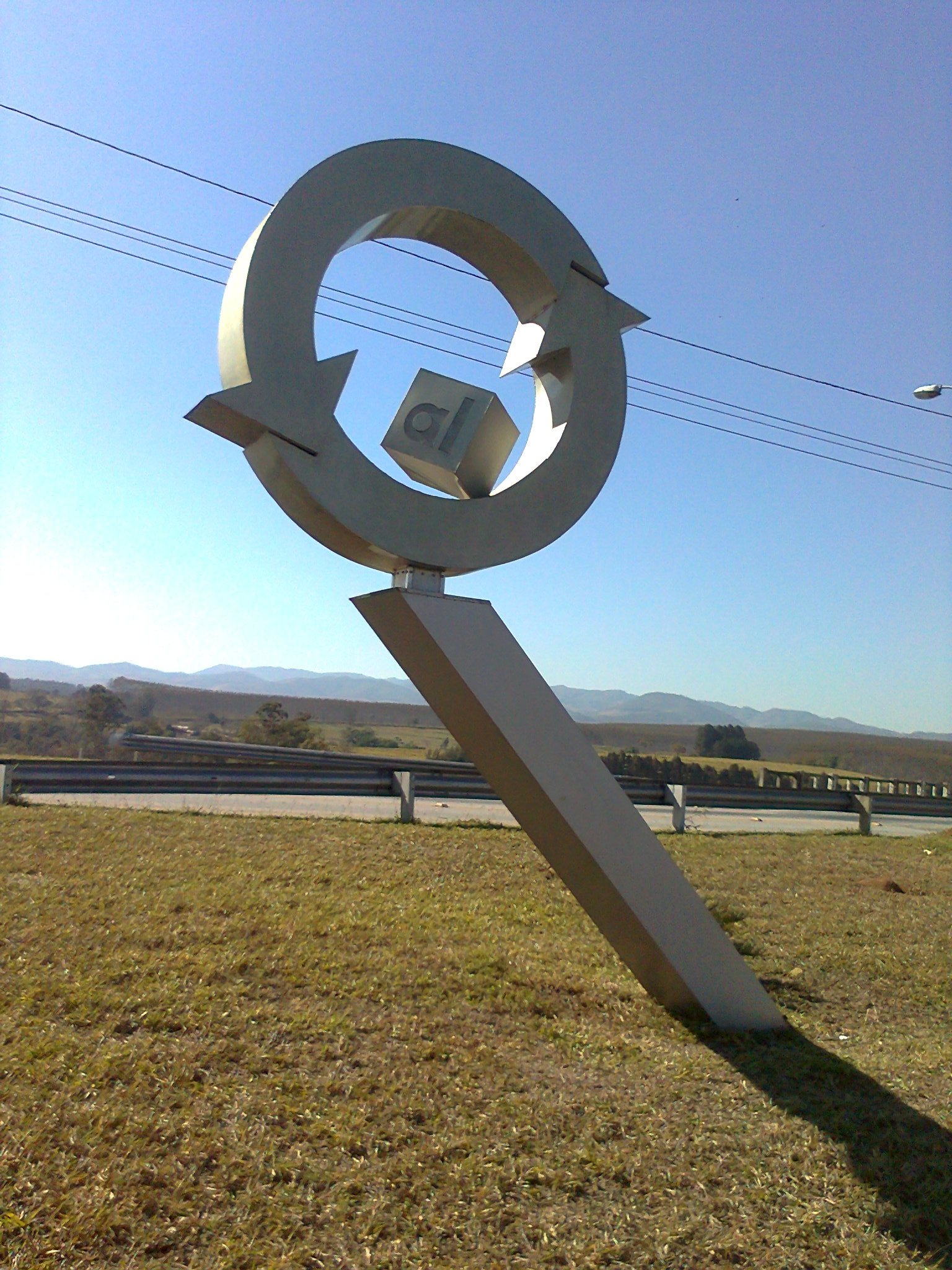
- Symbol of aluminum recycling in Pindamonhangaba, which is the largest center for recycling aluminum cans in Latin America.

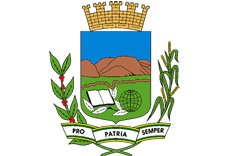
- Flag Coat of arms
- Nickname: Princesa do Norte (Princess of the North)
- Motto: Pro Patria Semper (Latin) (Pro Country Always)
- Location in the state of São Paulo

- Location in Brazil
- Coordinates: 22°55′26″S 45°27′42″W
- Country: Brazil
- Region: Southeast
- State: São Paulo
- Metropolitan Region: Vale do Paraíba e Litoral Norte
- Founded: July 10, 1705

Government
  - Mayor: Isael Domingues (PR) (2017–2020)

Area
  - Total: 729.9 km^{2} (281.8 sq mi)
- Elevation: 540 m (1,770 ft)

Population (2022 Census)
  - Total: 165,428
  - Estimate (2025): 172,681
  - Rank: 49st in state
  - Density: 226.6/km^{2} (587.0/sq mi)
- Demonym: Pindamonhangabense
- Time zone: UTC−3 (BRT)
- Postal Code (CEP): 12400-000
- Area code: (+55) 12
- Website: Pindamonhangaba, SP

Pindamonhangaba is a municipality in the state of São Paulo, Brazil, located in the Paraíba Valley, between the two most active production and consumption regions in the country, São Paulo and Rio de Janeiro. It is accessible by the Via Dutra (BR-116 – SP-60 highway) at the 99th kilometer. This place name comes from the Old Tupi language meaning "where hooks are made" or, according to a different interpretation, "where the river bends".

== Geography ==
- Estimated population (2022 Census): 165,428 inhabitants
- Total area: 730.2 km^{2} (281.93 sq mi)
- Density (estimated 2020): 232.99 hab/km^{2} (608/sq mi)
- Population (Census 2010): 146,995 inhabitants
- Density (Census 2010): 201.39/km^{2} (531/sq mi)

Source: IBGE

- Altitude: 540 meters
- Humid subtropical climate (Cwa)
- Average annual temperature: 20.7 °C (69.3 °F)

== History ==
The region then occupied by the Portuguese was Pindamonhangaba at least since July 22, 1643, registering more remote occupation by a certain Captain João Prado Martins. Six years later, on May 17, 1649, the area was formalized as a land grant and donated to the captain. It seems there is no information about what occurred between that date and August 12, 1672, so 13 years later, a chapel was built in honor of São José by brothers Antônio Bicudo Leme and Braz Esteves Leme. These brothers have acquired of the Countess of Vimieiro (Condesa de Vimieiro), the lands north of the town of Taubaté. There is no news of how the allotment had passed from the hands of Captain Prado Martins to the Countess. Given the uncertainties, two recent mayors of the city solved the problem by fiat: Caio Gomes Mayor officiated at the date of August 12, 1672 (Leme brothers) as the founding date of the city and later, Mayor João Bosco Nogueira decreed magna that date the county was founded was the date of emancipation, July 10, 1705.

=== Territorial evolution ===
On April 16, 1858, it lost part of the territory that was located in the Serra da Mantiqueira, turning into a new municipality São Bento do Sapucaí. Later it was fragmented into two new municipalities, Campos do Jordão and Santo Antônio do Pinhal. On November 30, 1944, it lost part of the territory to Aparecida, on its border, for the creation of the Roseira district, which two decades later became a city.

== Media ==
In telecommunications, the city was served by Telecomunicações de São Paulo. In July 1998, this company was acquired by Telefónica, which adopted the Vivo brand in 2012. The company is currently an operator of cell phones, fixed lines, internet (fiber optics/4G) and television (satellite and cable).

== Notable people ==
- Luiz Gustavo, football player for Al Nassr.
- Éverson, football player for Atlético Mineiro.
- Matheus Salustiano, football player for Rio Claro Futebol Clube.
- Hilton Moreira, football player for Persipura Jayapura
- João Carlos de Oliveira, athlete, gold medal of triple jump in 1975 Pan American Games.
- Geraldo Alckmin, politician, governor of São Paulo from 2001 to 2006, and then again from 2011 to 2018.
- Ciro Gomes, politician, governor of Ceará from 1991 to 1994.
- Antônio Moreira César, Brazilian army officer.
- Berta Celeste, a poet who wrote the Portuguese version of “Happy Birthday To You, Parabéns a Você.

== See also ==
- List of municipalities in São Paulo
