= Super Rádio Tupi =

Brazilian radio station

Super Rádio Tupi (ZYD 461)
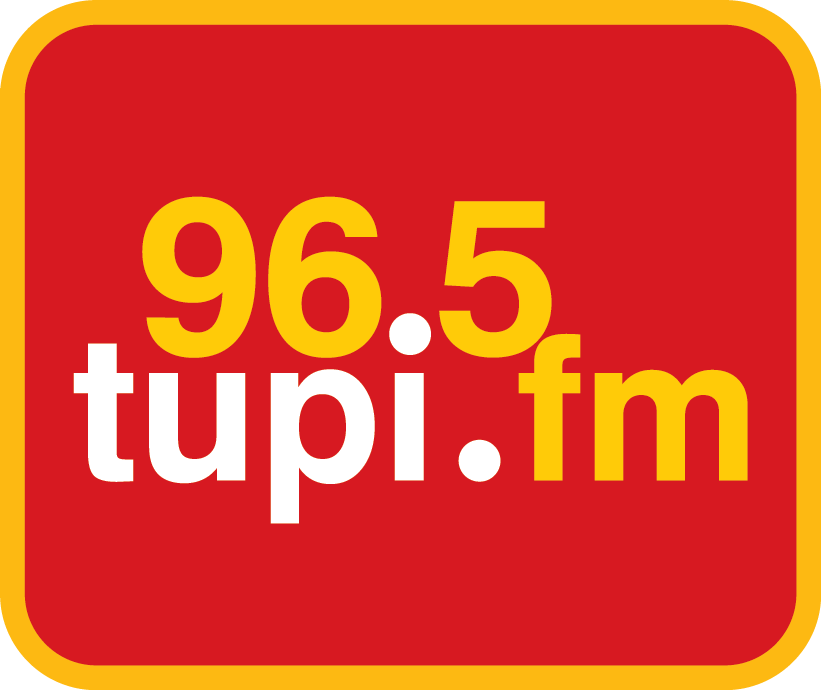

Rio de Janeiro, Brazil; Brazil
- Broadcast area: Rio de Janeiro (state)
- Frequency: FM: 96.5 MHz

Programming
- Language: Brazilian Portuguese
- Format: Entertainment; sports; news

Ownership
- Owner: Diários Associados

History
- First air date: 25 September 1935
- Former call signs: ZYJ 455
- Former frequencies: AM: 1280 kHz; SW: 6115 kHz; SW: 9610 kHz; SW: 15370 kHz

Technical information
- Transmitter coordinates: 22°46′24.0″S 43°03′59.6″W

Links
- Website: tupi.fm

Super Rádio Tupi (or simply Rádio Tupi) is a Brazilian radio station based in the city of Rio de Janeiro, Brazil. It specialises in entertainment, sports, and news broadcasting on FM 96.5 MHz. Rádio Tupi was inaugurated in 1935 by the journalist Assis Chateaubriand, and is owned by media conglomerate Diários Associados. Its studios are located in the Rio de Janeiro headquarters of Diários Associados, in the neighborhood of São Cristóvão. It is the second most listened to radio station in Rio de Janeiro, with 210 thousand listeners per minute between 5am and midnight, in June and August 2020.

== History ==
Rádio Tupi was inaugurated by the journalist Assis Chateaubriand on September 25, 1935, in a ceremony attended by radio transmission pioneer Guglielmo Marconi. Marconi's Wireless Telegraph & Signal Company supplied the radio station's first transmitter.

In 1942, Almirante (Henrique Foréis Domingues), a Rádio Tupi presenter, launched a competition to select Portuguese lyrics to the melody of the popular English language birthday song Happy Birthday to You. The winning entry was Parabéns a Você, written by Berta Celeste.

In December 2016, Rádio Tupi's employees conducted three separate strikes, lasting 24, 48 and 72 hours, due to payments that they were due, being delayed. Then as of December 30, 2016, in a meeting with the Union of Radio Broadcasters in Rio de Janeiro, Rádio Tupi's employees decided to strike indefinitely. 35 days later on February 4, 2016, Rádio Tupi returned to the air, and in the following week 41 striking employees were dismissed.

== Awards ==
In 2015, Rádio Tupi investigative journalist Róbson Machado de Souza, received an honourable mention, in the radio category of the 37th Vladimir Herzog Awards for amnesty and human rights.
