= Ay, qué noche tan preciosa =

"Ay, qué noche tan preciosa", also known by its original name "Cumpleaños Felíz", is a birthday song traditionally sung during birthday parties in Venezuela. Its author was the Venezuelan musician and singer-songwriter Luis Alejandro Cruz Cordero and it was popularized by the Venezuelan singer-songwriter Emilio Arvelo, whose version consolidated the song throughout the country.

== See also ==
- List of birthday songs
