= Parabéns a Você =

Portuguese version of "Happy Birthday to You"

Parabéns a Você, commonly known as Parabéns para Você or Parabéns pra Você in Brazil, is the title of the Portuguese version of the popular English language song, "Happy Birthday to You". It is traditionally sung to celebrate a person's birthday in countries where Portuguese is an official language. The lyrics were written by Berta Celeste, a Brazilian poet, in 1942.

== History ==
The traditional English language song, Happy Birthday to you, arrived in Brazil in the 1930s, where it would be sung, in English, at birthday parties. In 1942 the singer Almirante (Henrique Foréis Domingues), a Rádio Tupi presenter in Rio de Janeiro, launched a competition to select Portuguese lyrics to the melody of Happy Birthday to you. The winning entry took five minutes to write, and was written by Berta Celeste from Pindamonhangaba, São Paulo.

== Lyrics ==
Until her death in 1999, Berta Celeste insisted that the lyrics be sung as she wrote them. However the lyrics that are most commonly sung in Brazil are slightly different from the original, and it is also customary to add a second, unofficial verse.

É pique, é pique. É pique, é pique, é pique!
É hora, é hora. É hora, é hora, é hora!
Rá-tim-bum!

Translation:

It's peaking(enthusiasm), it's peaking. It's peaking, it's peaking, it's peaking!
It's time, it's time. It's time, it's time, it's time!
Rá-tim-bum! (the sound a drum kit makes)

== Copyright ==
While the English language version of the song is in the public domain, the Escritório Central de Arrecadação e Distribuição still collects royalties for the Portuguese song on behalf of the descendents of Berta Celeste.

== See also ==
- List of birthday songs
