= Chute na santa incident =

1995 religious controversy in Brazil

Photograph of a television set showing the moment Sérgio Von Helder kicks the image

The "Chute na santa" (Portuguese: Chute na santa - "kicking the saint") incident was a religious controversy that erupted in Brazil in late 1995, sparked by a live broadcast of a minister of Universal Church of the Kingdom of God (UCKG), the largest pentecostal church in Brazil, kicking the statue of Our Lady of Aparecida, a Catholic saint.

== The incident ==
The incident took place on October 12, 1995, the national public holiday honouring Our Lady of Aparecida, the patron saint of Brazil. That dawn, on O Despertar da Fé (English: The Awakening of Faith), a national live television program by UCKG broadcast on Rede Record (owned by the same church), televangelist bishop Sérgio Von Helder was expressing his thoughts about his church's biblical teachings on "imagery" and "idolatry" on the saint's day, when an actual icon of the saint was shown. Then, as he walked around the image, talking about its inability "to see" and "to hear", he started to kick the image, proclaiming its "inability to react, because it's made of clay".

On the following day, Rede Globo's Jornal Nacional denounced the incident, causing a nationwide commotion. The event was perceived by Catholics as a major act of religious intolerance, sparking a public outcry. Several temples of the UCKG were the target of protests, and Von Helder had to be transferred to South Africa until the end of the controversy.

== Reaction ==
Pope John Paul II urged Catholics not to "answer evil with evil". Dom Eugênio de Araújo Sales, then Archbishop of Rio de Janeiro, said that "unless we control our emotions, there is the risk of a holy war". President of Brazil Fernando Henrique Cardoso, when questioned about the incident, said that "Brazil is a democratic country known by its tolerance" and that "any demonstration of intolerance hurts its unison spirit as well as its Christian spirit".

== See also ==
- Anti-Catholicism
- History of the Catholic Church in Brazil
- Persecution of Christians
- Catholic Church in Brazil
