= Ja, må han (hon) leva =

Swedish birthday song

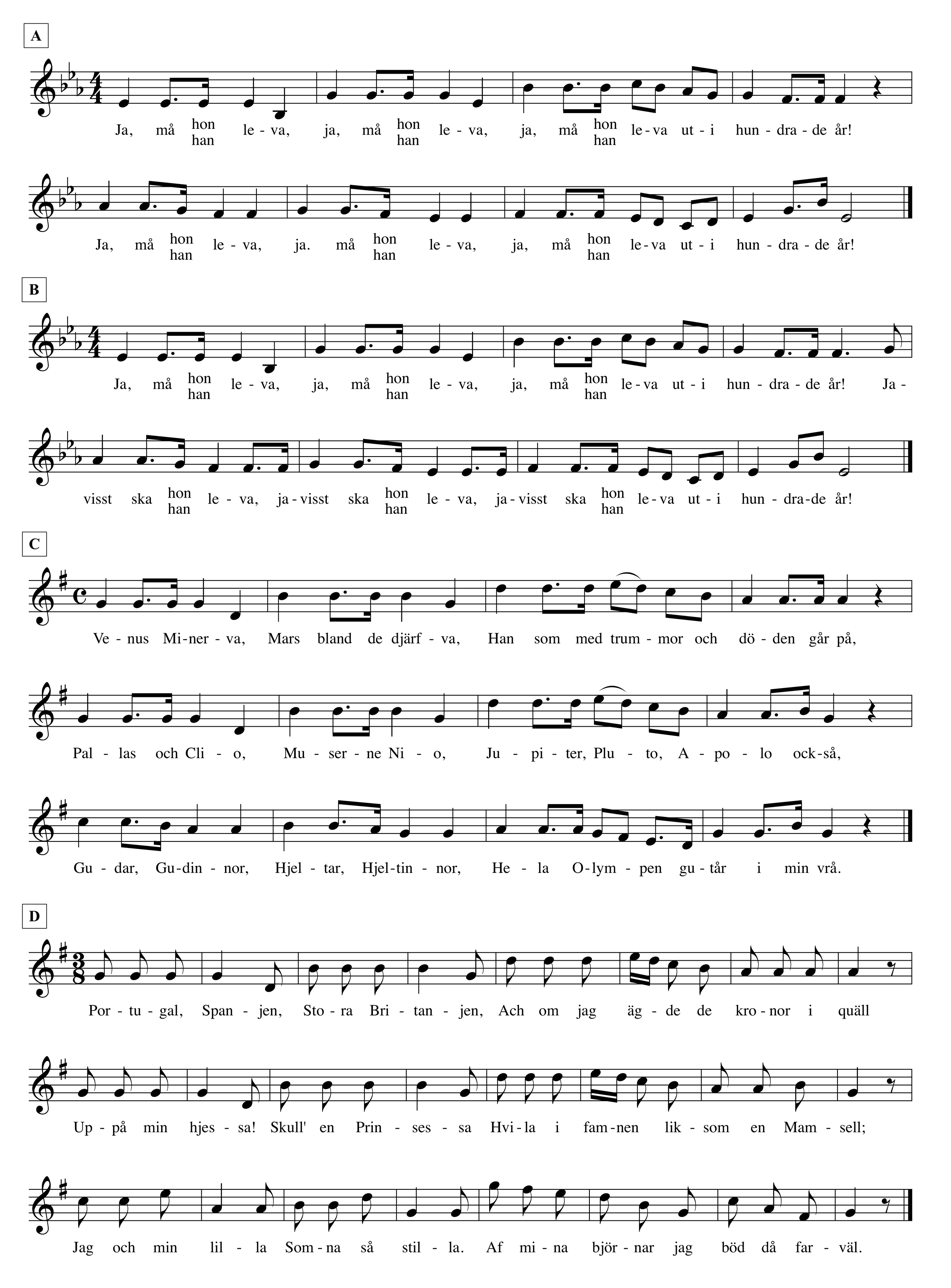
Ex A: "Ja, må han (hon) leva" as printed in the songbook "Gula visboken", 1953. Ex B: "Ja, må han (hon) leva" as sung lately. Ex C: "Venus Minerva", Fredman's song no 12 with lyrics by Carl Michael Bellman. Ex D: "Portugal, Spanjen", Fredman's song no 11 with lyrics by Carl Michael Bellman.

Ja, må han (hon) leva (Yes, may he (she) live) is a Swedish birthday song. It originates from the 18th century, but the use as well as its lyrics and melody has changed over the years. It is a song that "every Swede" knows and it is therefore rarely printed in songbooks. Both lyrics and melody are of unknown origin. It has a similar melody as the Dutch birthday song "Lang zal hij leven", Dutch-translated Afrikaans wedding song "Lank sal [hy/sy/hul] lewe", Dutch-translated Indonesian birthday song "Panjang Umurnya" and Romanian birthday song "Mulți ani trăiască".

== Music ==
James Massengale states that the melody is of a common 18th century form, used by both Mozart and Haydn, and was therefore well known in Austria at the end of the 18th century.

Carl Michael Bellman uses the melody in different shapes for three different songs. Fredman's song no. 11 (“Portugal, Spanjen”) has the form of a light 3/8 Contra dance while no. 12 (”Venus Minerva”) is a steady march in 4/4. This melody is also used in the song "Högtid beredes och Ganymedes".

In Germany the melody was published in 1877 in a songbook for high schools with the words ”Hoch soll er leben”. In the Netherlands the song "Lang zal hij leven" is used at birthdays. The three first bars of these songs are equal to ”Ja må han leva”.

== Lyrics ==
The three songs by Bellman have all words concerning drinking and feast. The wedding song "Brudgum och bruden vilka i skruden" published in a broadsheet around 1800 is noted to be sung to the melody of "Venus Minerva".

The Swedish Salvation Army published in Stridsropet (The War Cry) in 1884 a hymn "Jesus allena mitt hjärta skall äga" ("Jesus alone shall own my heart") to the melody of ”Venus Minerva”.

The first time the song appears with the lyrics "Ja må han leva" is in a student songbook in 1914, then used as a drinking song and the first confirmation of the use of the song as a birthday song is as late as of around 1940. Consequently, the song was mainly used as a drinking song during the 19th century but from around 1940 mainly as a birthday song.

== See also ==
- List of birthday songs

== See also ==
- List of birthday songs
