= A di mi yere yu friyari =

Surinamese song

"A di mi yere yu friyari" is a very popular birthday song in Suriname. The lyrics are in the Surinamese language Sranan Tongo. The song consists of only two verses of which either the first or both can be sung. Kids like to shout "hachoo" (an onomatopoeia of a sneeze) after the first verse just because it rhymes.

The tune is most famously used in "The Battle Hymn of the Republic", a hymn from the American Civil War, better known for its refrain "Glory! Glory! Hallelujah!".

== History ==
=== History of the Lyrics ===
The origin of the lyrics of "A di mi yere yu friyari" are unknown.

=== History of the Tune ===
The written record of the tune can be traced to 1858 in a book called The Union Harp and Revival Chorister, selected and arranged by Charles Dunbar, and published in Cincinnati. The book contains the words and music of a song "My Brother Will You Meet Me", with the music and the opening line "Say my brother will you meet me". In December 1858 a Brooklyn Sunday school published a version called "Brothers, Will You Meet Us" with the words and music of the "Glory Hallelujah" chorus, and the opening line "Say, brothers will you meet us", under which title the song then became known. The hymn is often attributed to William Steffe, though Steffe's role may have been more as transcriber and/or modifier of a commonly sung tune.

== Lyrics ==
=== "A di mi yere yu friyari" ===
A di mi yere yu friyari
A di mi yere yu friyari
A di mi yere yu friyari, dan mi kon fersteri yu.

A no f' yu kuk', a no f' yu sopi
A no f' yu kuk', a no f' yu sopi
A no f' yu kuk', a no f' yu sopi, dan mi kon fersteri yu.

=== "A di mi yere yu friyari" (English translation) ===
Because I heard it is your birthday
Because I heard it is your birthday
Because I heard it is your birthday, I have come to congratulate you.

Not for your cake, not for your drinks
Not for your cake, not for your drinks
Not for your cake, not for your drinks, that I have come to congratulate you.

(*friyari variant: feryari; fersteri variants: fristeri, frusteri)

== See also ==
- List of birthday songs
