= Our Lady of Aparecida =

Patroness of Brazil

Our Lady of Aparecida Blessed Virgin of the Immaculate Conception in Aparecida
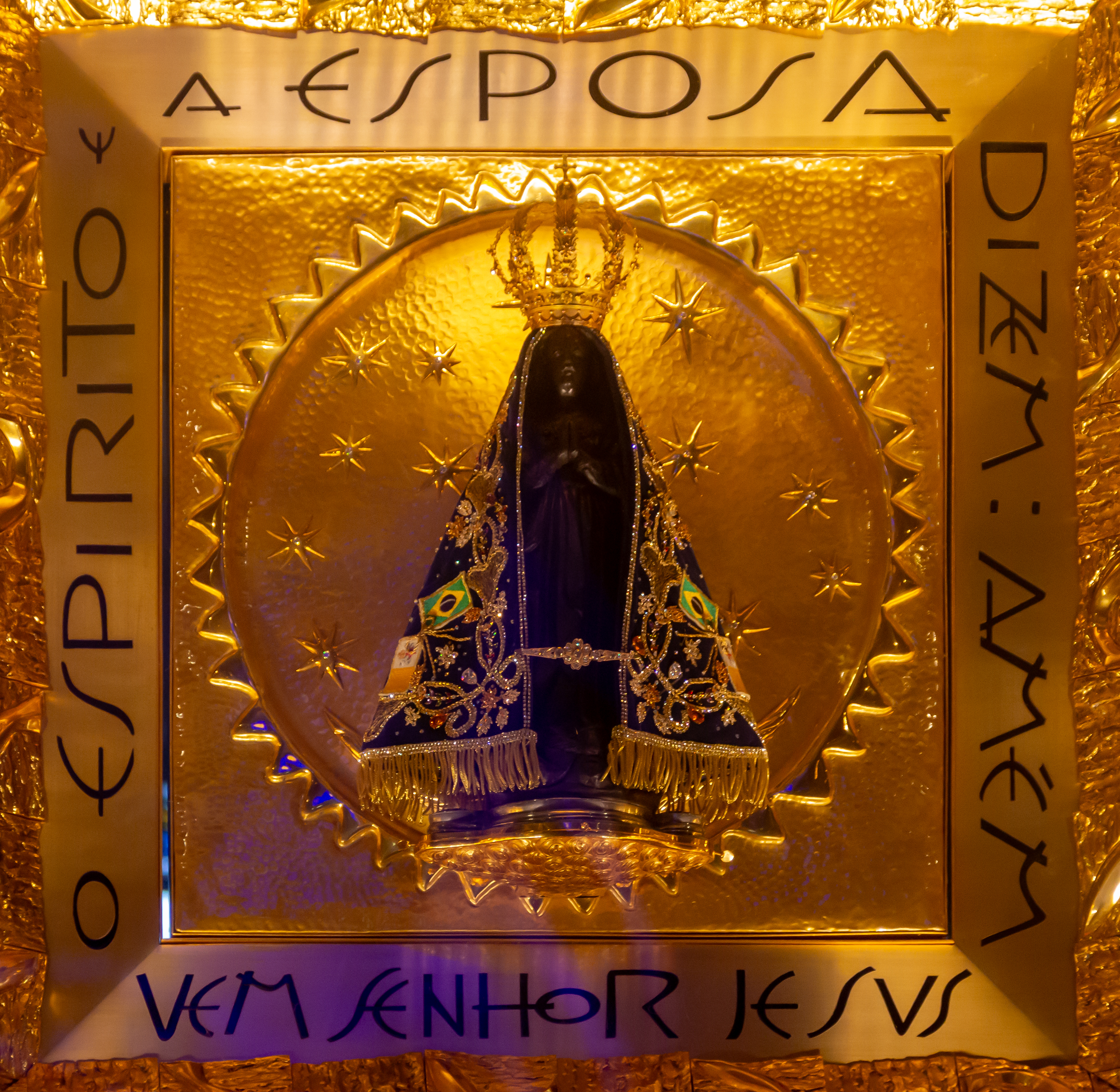
- The original image enshrined in the central high altar.
- Venerated in: Catholic Church
- Major shrine: Basilica of the National Shrine of Our Lady Aparecida, Brazil
- Feast: October 12
- Attributes: Mantle, crown, stars
- Patronage: Brazil and Brazilian people, Roman Catholic Archdiocese of Aparecida, World Youth Day 2013, expectant mothers, newborn children, rivers and the sea, gold, honey, beauty
- Controversy: (1978) Theft and vandalism by Protestant intruder (1995); Public insults and televised vandalism by a UCKG minister

Our Lady of Aparecida (Portuguese: Nossa Senhora Aparecida or Nossa Senhora da Conceição Aparecida) is a Roman Catholic title of the Blessed Virgin Mary associated with the Immaculate Conception.

The Terracota statue is widely venerated by Brazilian Catholics, who consider her as the principal patroness of Brazil. Historical accounts state that the statue was originally found by three fishermen who miraculously caught many fish after invoking the Blessed Virgin Mary. The statue is currently enshrined in the Basilica of the National Shrine of Our Lady Aparecida in Aparecida, São Paulo, Brazil. The feast day of the image is on October 12, which is also a public holiday in Brazil since 1980.

Pope John Paul II raised the shrine of the image to the status of Minor Basilica via the Pontifical decree Satis Superque Constat in 27 April 1981. It is the largest Marian shrine in the world, being able to hold up to 45,000 worshippers.

== Pontifical approbations ==
- Pope Leo XIII approved the cult of Marian devotion to the image during a Papal audience with the Brazilian bishops who requested the coronation of the image. The unsigned decree was granted to the former Archbishop of Rio de Janeiro, Cardinal Joaquim Cavalcanti on 21 December 1903, under the title Nossa Senhora da Conceição Aparecida.
- Pope Pius X signed and notarized the decree of canonical coronation to the image on 8 September 1904. The rite of coronation was executed by the former Bishop of Sao Paolo, Lino Deodato Rodriguez.
- Pope Pius XI declared Mary under this title Patroness of Brazil via the Pontifical decree Ab Archiepiscopo Sancti on 16 July 1930, signed and notarized by the former Vatican Secretary of State, Cardinal Eugenio Pacelli.
- Pope Paul VI granted the image her first golden rose on 12 August 1967.
- Pope John Paul II raised her shrine to the status of minor basilica via his Pontifical decree Satis Superque Constat on 27 April 1981.
- Pope Benedict XVI granted the image her second golden rose on 12 May 2007.
- Pope Francis approved a donation of the same image gifted by the Government of Brazil to be enshrined at the Vatican Gardens on 3 September 2016. He later gifted the third golden rose on 9 October 2017, on the occasion of her tercentennial anniversary of the devotion (1717).

== History ==
A chromolithograph depiction of the image, circa 1919

According to the account of the discovery of the statue in October 1717, the Count of Assumar, Pedro Miguel de Almeida Portugal e Vasconcelos, who was the Governor of the Captaincy of São Paulo and Minas Gerais, was passing through the area of Guaratinguetá, a small city in the Paraíba river valley, during a trip to Vila Rica, an important gold mining site.

As the people of Guaratinguetá decided to hold a feast in his honour, three fishermen, Domingos Garcia, João Alves, and Filipe Pedroso went down to the Paraíba waters to fish. The fishermen prayed to Our Lady of the Immaculate Conception that God would grant a good catch. The fishermen, having a run of bad luck, cast their nets in the River Paraiba and dragged up a headless statue of the Virgin Mary. They also salvaged the head and, according to the legend, then netted plenty of fish. After cleaning the statue, they found that it was a dark clay version of Our Lady of the Immaculate Conception. Legend has it that when the fishermen recovered the body, then the head, the slender figure of the Aparecida Virgin became so heavy that they couldn't budge it.

The fishermen named the statue Nossa Senhora da Conceição Aparecida (English: Our Lady of the Conception, the Appeared). Neighbors began to venerate the statue, which came to be known as Our Lady Aparecida (the Appeared), and devotion grew. The first chapel was built in 1745.

Devotion to the statue grew rapidly, particularly among Afro-Brazilians, not only for its black Madonna status, but also because it was reported to have performed a miracle for a young Negroid slave. Over the years following its discovery, veneration of the Virgin invoked as Aparecida increased as many miracles were attributed to her. For the following fifteen years, the statue remained within Filipe Pedroso's family, and neighbors came to venerate it. Stories of Our Lady Aparecida's miracles were spread throughout Brazil, and the Pedroso family built her a chapel which soon became too small for so many worshippers. In 1737, the Catholic priest of Guaratinguetá built her a chapel on the Morro dos Coqueiros (Hill of Coconut Palms), where public visits began in July 1745.

The number of worshippers increased dramatically, and in 1834 work on a larger church was begun; this became known as the "Old Basilica" when work on the even larger "New Basilica" was started in 1955; it received pontifical approbation in April 1981. In 1928, the "City of Aparecida" was consolidated around the old Basílica.

=== The image ===
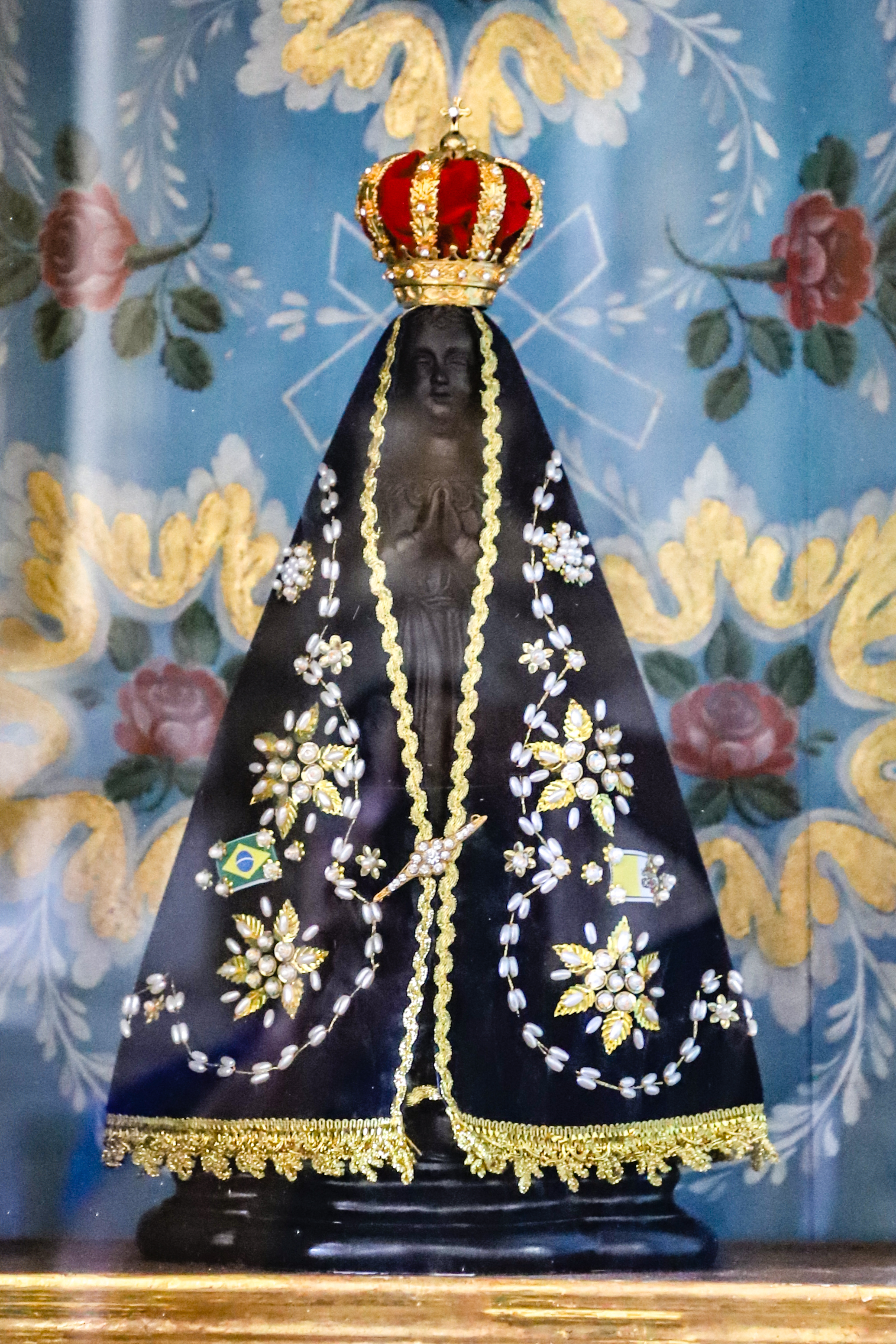
Parochial image

According to a local tale the clay statue was imported from Portugal; others say that it was made by Frei Agostinho de Jesus, a monk from São Paulo known for crafting artistic sacred images in clay. The small statue is less than three feet tall. The image was made around 1650, and must have been underwater for years, since it lost its original polychromy.

The image is dark brown, and covered by a stiff dark blue robe of richly embroidered thick cloth emblazoned with the flags of Brazil and the Vatican City State with golden clasps. An imperial crown was added in 1904.A bronze replica of the same image is sponsored by the Embassy of Brazil to the Vatican and was approved for installation within the Gardens of the Vatican City under the mandate of Pope Francis, officially held on 3 September 2016.

Reproductions of Aparecida's image are commonly found in São Paulo's garden cemeteries.

=== Royal patronage ===
At the expressed petition of Emperor Pedro I of Brazil, Pope Leo XII declared Saint Peter of Alcantara the "Patron of Brazil" on 31 May 1826. The ruler of Brazil at that time, Pedro I (born Prince Pedro de Alcantara), was named after Saint Peter of Alcantara.

In deference to the Blessed Virgin Mary whom outranks Saint Peter of Alcantara in the Catholic hierarchy of saints, the proclamation of the Virgin of Aparecida as the principal Catholic patron saint of Brazil, Saint Peter therefore became the secondary patron.

=== Canonical coronation ===
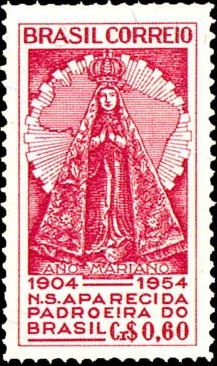
Commemorative stamp from 1904 illustrating Our Lady of Aparecida and celebrating Marian year

On the Feast of the Immaculate Conception 1904, to commemorate the 50th anniversary of the 1854 proclamation of the dogma of the Immaculate Conception, the statue was canonically crowned by the Archbishop of São Paulo, Lino Deodato Rodrigues, at the decree of the Holy See and in the presence of the Apostolic Nuncio. The coronation was carried out in the name and on behalf of Pope Pius X who granted this approval.

The papal coronation of the image of Aparecida was a major event attended by many people and by civil authorities including former President of Brazil, Rodrigues Alves, who made the point of witnessing the act in spite of the separation of Church and State that had been instituted when Brazil became a Republic, less than twenty years before. The gold metal used for the manufacture of the Crown was donated by the head of Brazil's imperial family, the exiled Princess Isabel.

After the pontifical coronation of 1904 the Holy See granted a divine office and Mass for her feast day.

Twenty years later, the village that had grown around the church on Coqueiros hill became a municipality, named after the saint.

== Patroness of Brazil (1930) ==
Pope Pius XI issued a Pontifical decree Ab Archiepiscopo Sancti on 16 July 1930 which declared the Blessed Virgin Mary of the Immaculate Conception under the title of Our Lady Aparecida to be the principal patroness of Brazil.

Pope Leo XIII previously granted the approval on the devotion of the image under the title "Nossa Senhora da Conceição Apparecida" on 21 December 1903 but the decree was unsigned.

Pope Pius X established the Office of the Mass under this honor and allowing this devotion to spread due to the widespread piety of the Brazilian people. The Papal decree mentions the 1904 solid gold crown given to the image (assumingly from Isabel, Princess Imperial of Brazil).

Accordingly, the devotion was researched by the former Prefect of the Sacred Congregation of Rites, Cardinal Camillo Laurenti . The decree was signed and notarized by Cardinal Eugenio Pacelli. In the wake of the papal decree naming Our Lady Aparecida Patroness of Brazil, on July 16, 1930, Cardinal Sebastião Leme da Silveira Cintra, the Archbishop of Rio de Janeiro (then the Capital of Brazil), rededicated Brazil to the Virgin under this Marian title.

== Later years ==
Up until the early 1950s, Aparecida remained an unassuming city with a small community of Redemptorists. They arrived from the sanctuary of the Virgin of Altötting in Germany and took on the responsibility for the shrine of Our Lady Aparecida, making it the first Redemptorist parish in Latin America. Devotion to the Marian image grew under Padre Vítor Coelho (1899-1987), a Redemptorist priest and catechist. In 1958, due to the growth of the Catholic community around the Marian Shrine of Aparecida, the Holy See decided to erect the Metropolitan Archdiocese of Aparecida, separating its territory in part from the Archdiocese of São Paulo and in part from the Diocese of Taubaté and transferring three suffragan Dioceses that previously were subject to the Metropolitan Archbishop of São Paulo to form the new ecclesiastical province of Aparecida. The new See was led by administrators until 1964, when the first Archbishop of Aparecida was appointed.

In 1967, Our Lady of Aparecida was granted the title of generalissima of the Brazilian Army.

Contrary to popular belief, John Paul II was the first Pope to consecrate the shrine with the title of Basilica on July 4, 1980. In his Apostolic message, the Pontiff mentioned the coronation of 1904, the Patronage granted in 1930, and his culminating purpose of consecration of the shrine as a Basilica during that time. By research in Vatican documents, there is no mention of 1908 proclamations of the shrine as a Basilica by the Pope or any Vatican prelate.

Pope Francis installed a replica of the same Marian image within the Vatican Gardens in September 2016 via the diplomatic efforts of the Brazilian embassy to the Holy See.

=== Assault on the image ===
The image became the source of religious conflicts between Catholics and Protestants, primarily driven by non-mainline churches identified with charismatic, evangelical, or fundamentalist theology, including all branches of Pentecostalism, due to the nature of Catholic Marian devotion associated with the religious image.

On May 16, 1978, a person identified as a member of a Protestant sect took the statue from its niche on the basilica after the last Mass of the day. He was chased by guards and some of the church goers. As he was caught, the statue fell to the ground breaking to pieces; a group of artists and artisans pieced it together again.

On her feast day in 1995, a public holiday, an incident later known as "kicking of the saint" took place when televangelist Sérgio Von Helder (or Helde), of the Universal Church of the Kingdom of God (UCKG), insulted and kicked a replica of Our Lady Aparecida, and said that "it could not do anything for you", on a late-night religious program broadcast by UCKG television station Rede Record. On the following day, Rede Globo's Jornal Nacional denounced the incident, causing a nationwide commotion. The event was perceived by Catholics as a major act of religious intolerance, causing a public outcry. Several temples of the UCKG were targeted by protesters, and Von Helder was transferred to South Africa until the end of the controversy.

== The new Basilica ==
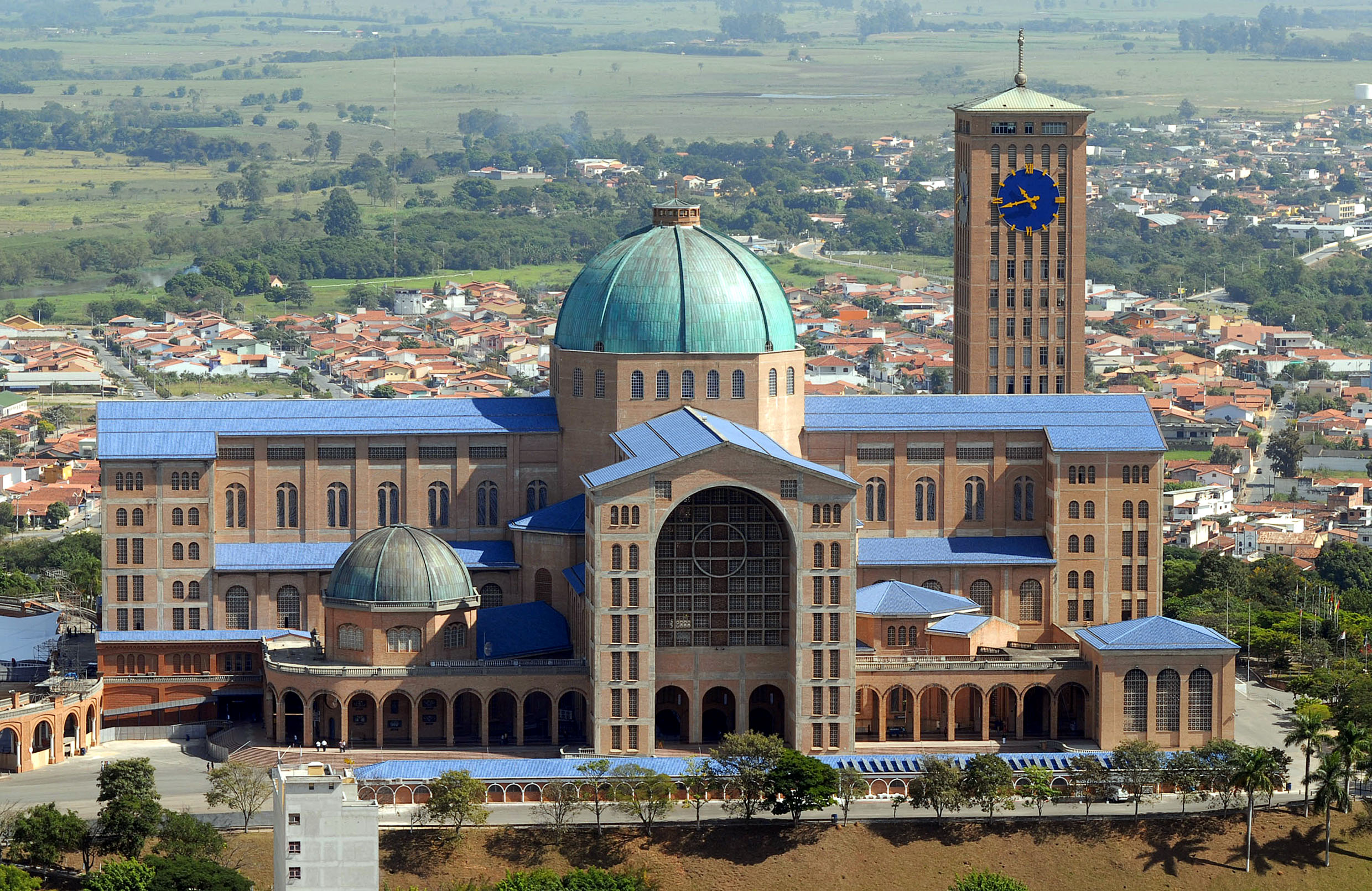
The National Basilica, located in Aparecida, São Paulo, Brazil

In the mid-20th century, as the popularity of Our Lady Aparecida grew, the construction of a much larger building to shelter the image became necessary. In 1955, work on the present Basilica of the National Shrine of Our Lady Aparecida was begun. Architect Benedito Calixto designed a building in the form of a Greek cross. It can hold up to 45,000 people.

On July 4, 1980, while still under construction, the new church was consecrated by Pope John Paul II and given the title of minor basilica. It is currently the largest Marian temple and the second largest Basilica in the world, second only to St. Peter's in the Vatican City.

Since then, the two Basilicas in the city of Aparecida have been known as the "Old Basilica" and the "New Basilica". Upon its completion, the Brazilian Conference of Catholic Bishops declared the new Basilica a National Shrine.

As the National Shrine, dedicated to the patroness of Brazil, one of the functions of the basilica is to function as a site of pilgrimage for laborers. The traditional pilgrimage of the laborers takes place each year on Brazil's independence holiday, September 7. According to recent estimates, the basilica attracts about 8 million pilgrims a year.

The influence of Our Lady Aparecida on Brazilian Catholic society is incalculable. In 1992 a study showed that 296 parishes were dedicated to her while five cathedrals had the same title. In addition, many towns are named after the Virgin and so are many Brazilian women and girls. The modern art styled cathedral of Brasília designed by Oscar Niemeyer is dedicated to Our Lady Aparecida, as Brasília is the national capital and she is invoked as Brazil's special protector.

In 2004, to commemorate the centennial of the pontifical coronation commanded by Pope Pius X and the 150th anniversary of the dogmatic definition of the Immaculate Conception of the Blessed Virgin Mary, the statue of Our Lady Aparecida was granted a renewed canonical coronation by the Holy See. The renewed coronation was presided by the Archbishop emeritus of Rio de Janeiro, Cardinal Eugênio Sales, in the capacity of special papal envoy of Pope John Paul II.

On May 12, 2007 Pope Benedict XVI granted the Basilica of the National Shrine of Our Lady Aparecida a Golden Rose. The "Old Basilica" also possesses a Golden Rose, awarded by Pope Paul VI on August 12, 1967, and presented by the Apostolic Nuncio; it was a gift of the Holy See to mark the Pope's participation in the commemorations of the 250th anniversary of the devotion to the Virgin of Aparecida. The "New Basilica"'s Golden Rose was presented by Pope Benedict, who visited the basilica and celebrated Mass there during his 2007 Apostolic visit to Brazil. Pope Francis celebrated Mass at the shrine on July 24, 2013, and entrusted his pontificate as well as the World Youth Day to the maternal protection of the Blessed Virgin Mary.

== Feast day ==
Since the 19th century, the Feast Day of Our Lady Aparecida is celebrated on 12 October, which commemorates the day of the discovery of the image.

Within the liturgical calendar of the Roman Rite approved for Brazil, the day of Our Lady Aparecida ranks as a solemnity. The feast's rank as a solemnity was established by the Holy See at the request of the National Conference of Brazilian Bishops. The feast day of Our Lady Aparecida has been a National Holiday in Brazil since 1980. The federal statute declaring October 12 a national holiday in honour of "Our Lady Aparecida", Patroness of Brazil, was passed by Congress of Brazil and signed into law on 30 June 1980, during Pope John Paul II's first visit to the country; that was also the first visit by a Pope to Brazil, and during that visit the "New Basilica" of Aparecida was consecrated.

== See also ==
- Our Lady of the Pillar, an ancient tradition which also has a feast on October 12
- Roman Catholicism in Brazil
