= List of birthday songs =

This list of birthday songs contains songs which are sung on birthday occasions.

- Happy Birthday to You, an American song translated into a number of languages worldwide
- Parabéns a Você, Brazil and Portugal
- Mravalzhamieri, Georgia
- Las Mañanitas, Mexico
- Sto lat, Poland
- Gens du pays, Quebec, Canada
- A di mi yere yu friyari, Suriname
- Ja, må han (hon) leva, Sweden
- Med en enkel tulipan, Sweden
- Mnohaya lita, Ukraine
- Ay, qué noche tan preciosa, Venezuela
