= Basilica of Our Lady of Aparecida =

Roman Catholic church in Brazil

Coordinates: 22.8504°S 45.2338°W

Cathedral Basilica of the National Shrine of Our Lady in Aparecida
- Portuguese: Catedral Basílica do Santuário Nacional de Nossa Senhora Aparecida
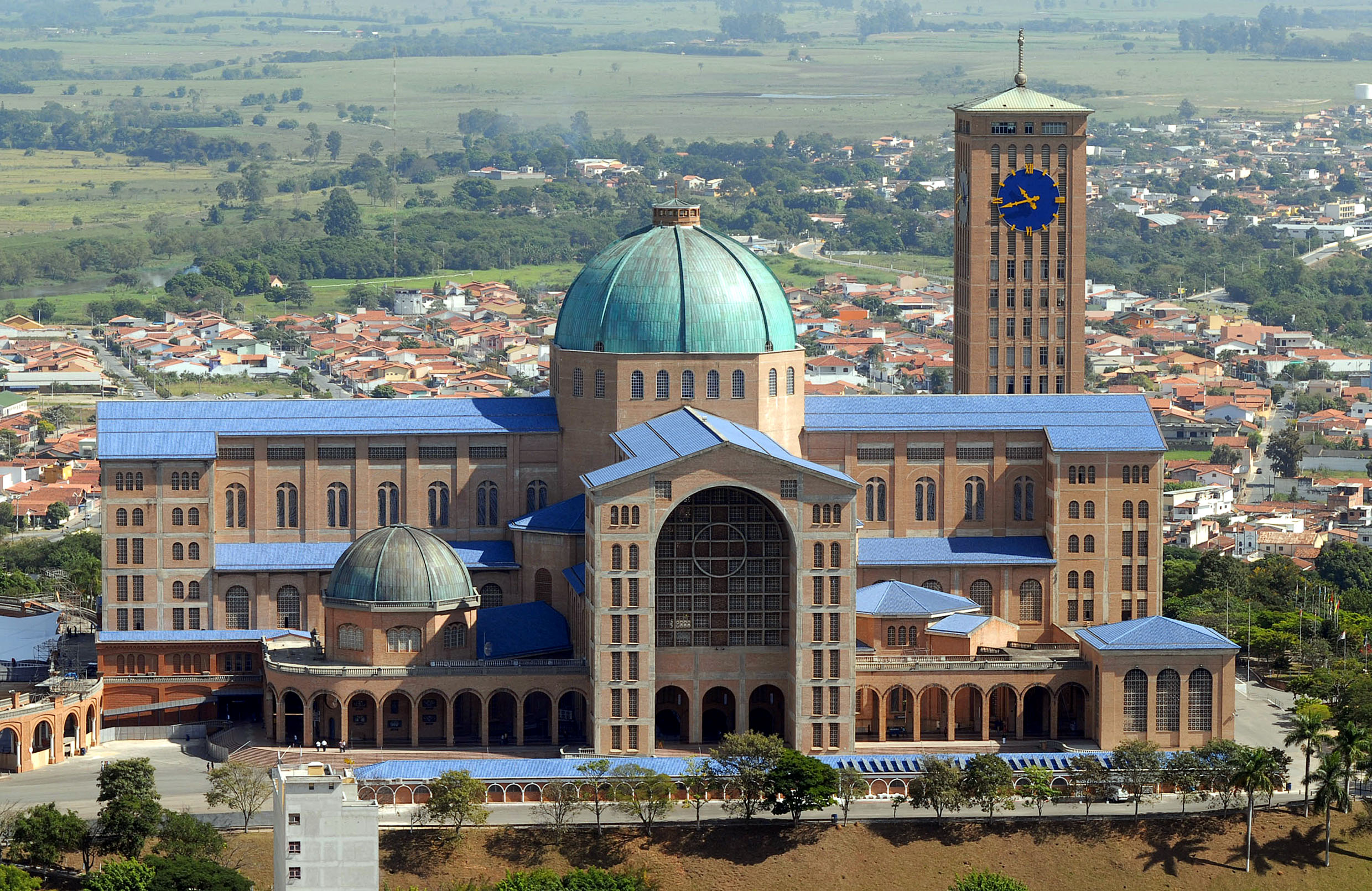
- Basílica do Santuário Nacional de Nossa Senhora Aparecida

Religion
- Affiliation: Catholic Church
- Province: Archdiocese of Aparecida
- Rite: Roman Rite
- Ecclesiastical or organisational status: Cathedral, minor basilica, national shrine
- Year consecrated: 4 July 1980

Location
- Location: Aparecida, Brazil
- Interactive map of Cathedral Basilica of the National Shrine of Our Lady in Aparecida

Architecture
- Architect: Benedito Calixto Filho
- Style: Romanesque Revival
- Groundbreaking: 1955

Specifications
- Capacity: 45,000 standing or 30,000 seated
- Length: 188 m (617 ft)
- Width: 183 m (600 ft)
- Height (max): 109 m (358 ft)
- Dome height (outer): 70 m (230 ft)

Website
- a12.com/santuario

The Cathedral Basilica of the National Shrine of Our Lady in Aparecida (Portuguese: Catedral Basílica do Santuário Nacional de Nossa Senhora Aparecida) is a prominent Roman Catholic basilica in Aparecida, Brazil. The Marian shrine is dedicated to the Blessed Virgin Mary under the venerated title of Our Lady of the Immaculate Conception in Aparecida, the principal patroness of Brazil. It is the largest cathedral in the world, and the second largest Catholic church by interior area and volume, after Saint Peter's Basilica in Vatican City.

Pope John Paul II raised the Marian shrine to the status of Minor Basilica via the Pontifical decree Satis Superque Constat in 27 April 1981. As a cathedral, it is the seat of the Archdiocese of Aparecida.

== History ==
The site has its origins in the finding of a small dark clay statue of the Virgin Mary. According to local tradition, three fishermen were attempting to catch a large amount of fish in the Paraíba River for a banquet honoring the visit of São Paulo governor Pedro de Almeida in 1717. Despite their prayers, their attempts were fruitless until late in the day, one of the fishermen cast his net and pulled it back to find a headless statue of the Virgin Mary. Upon his next cast, he found the head. The group cleaned the statue, wrapped it in cloth, and returned to their task to find their fortunes had changed and they were able to obtain all the fish they needed. The statue is believed to be the work of Frei Agostino de Jesus, a monk residing in São Paulo.

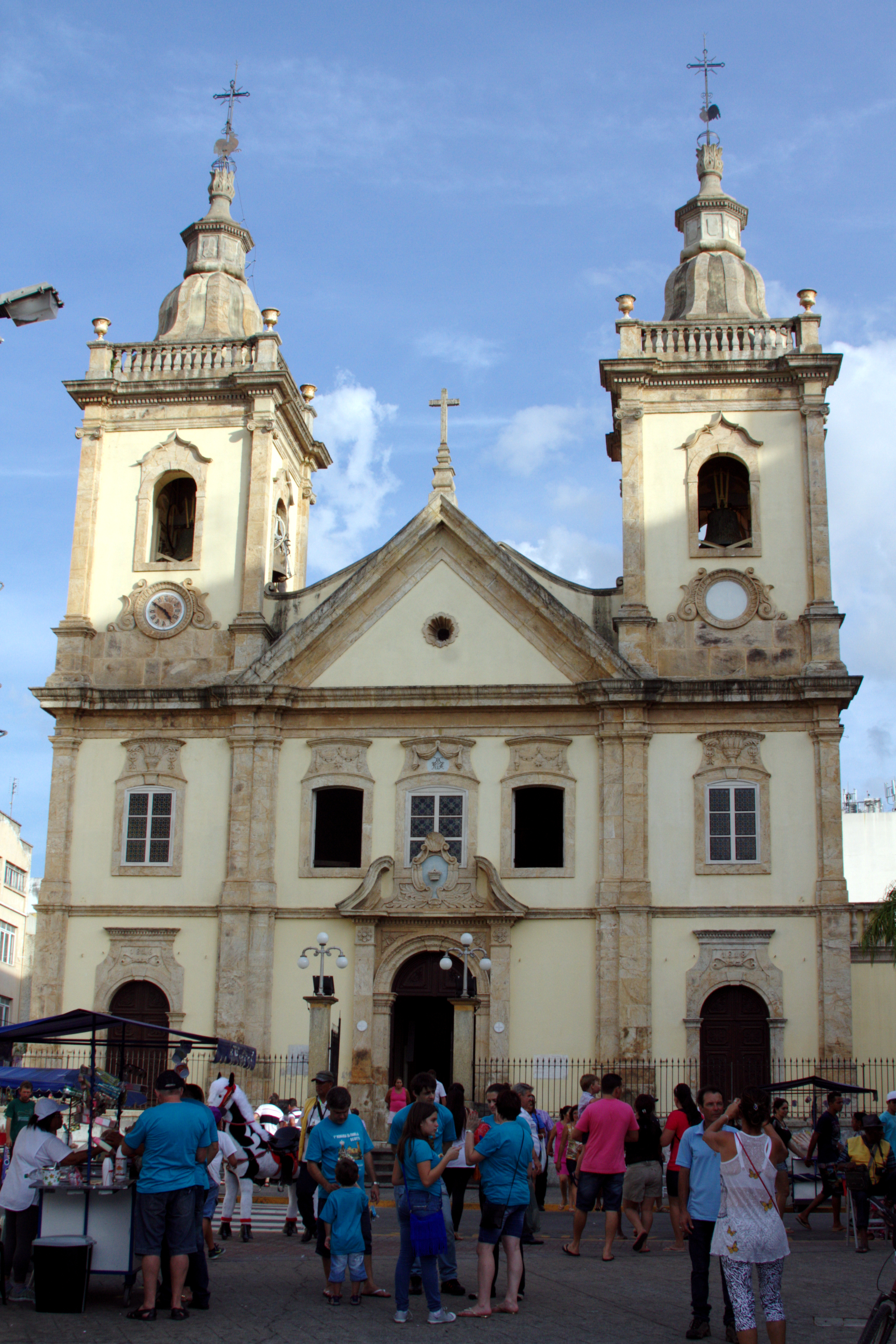
The facade of the original shrine (1888)

The statue was originally housed at the home of Felipe Pedroso, one of the fishermen who found it. This became a popular site for visitors wishing to pray to the image, leading Pedroso's family to build a small chapel to house the statue. This was replaced in 1734 by a larger chapel, and then in 1834 by the first basilica on the site. In 1955, with pilgrimage numbers still growing, the construction work began on the present building, in a site nearby. The basilica, including the external area, has room for more than 200,000 people and is second in capacity after St. Peter's Basilica.

The old wooden chapel was originally built in 1745. The old shrine is a modest church in the colonial style built between 1834 and 1888. Since that time, pious worshippers have termed it as a basilica.

== Pontifical approbations ==
- Pope Leo XIII approved the cult of Marian devotion to the image during a Papal audience with the Brazilian bishops who requested the coronation of the image. The unsigned decree was granted to the former Archbishop of Rio de Janeiro, Cardinal Joaquim Cavalcanti on 21 December 1903, under the title Nossa Senhora da Conceição Aparecida.
- Pope Pius X signed and notarized the decree of canonical coronation to the image on 8 September 1904. The rite of coronation was executed by the former Bishop of Sao Paolo, Lino Deodato Rodriguez.
- Pope Pius XI declared Mary under this title Patroness of Brazil via the Pontifical decree Ab Archiepiscopo Sancti on 16 July 1930, signed and notarized by the former Vatican Secretary of State, Cardinal Eugenio Pacelli.
- Pope Paul VI granted the image her first golden rose on 12 August 1967.
- Pope John Paul II raised her shrine to the status of minor basilica via his Pontifical decree Satis Superque Constat on 27 April 1981.
- Pope Benedict XVI visited the shrine and granted the image her second golden rose on 12 May 2007.
- Pope Francis visited the shrine in 2013. The same Pontiff approved a donation of the same image gifted by the Government of Brazil to be enshrined at the Vatican Gardens on 3 September 2016. He later gifted the third golden rose on 9 October 2017, on the occasion of her tercentennial anniversary of the devotion (1717).

== Basilica (1954) ==
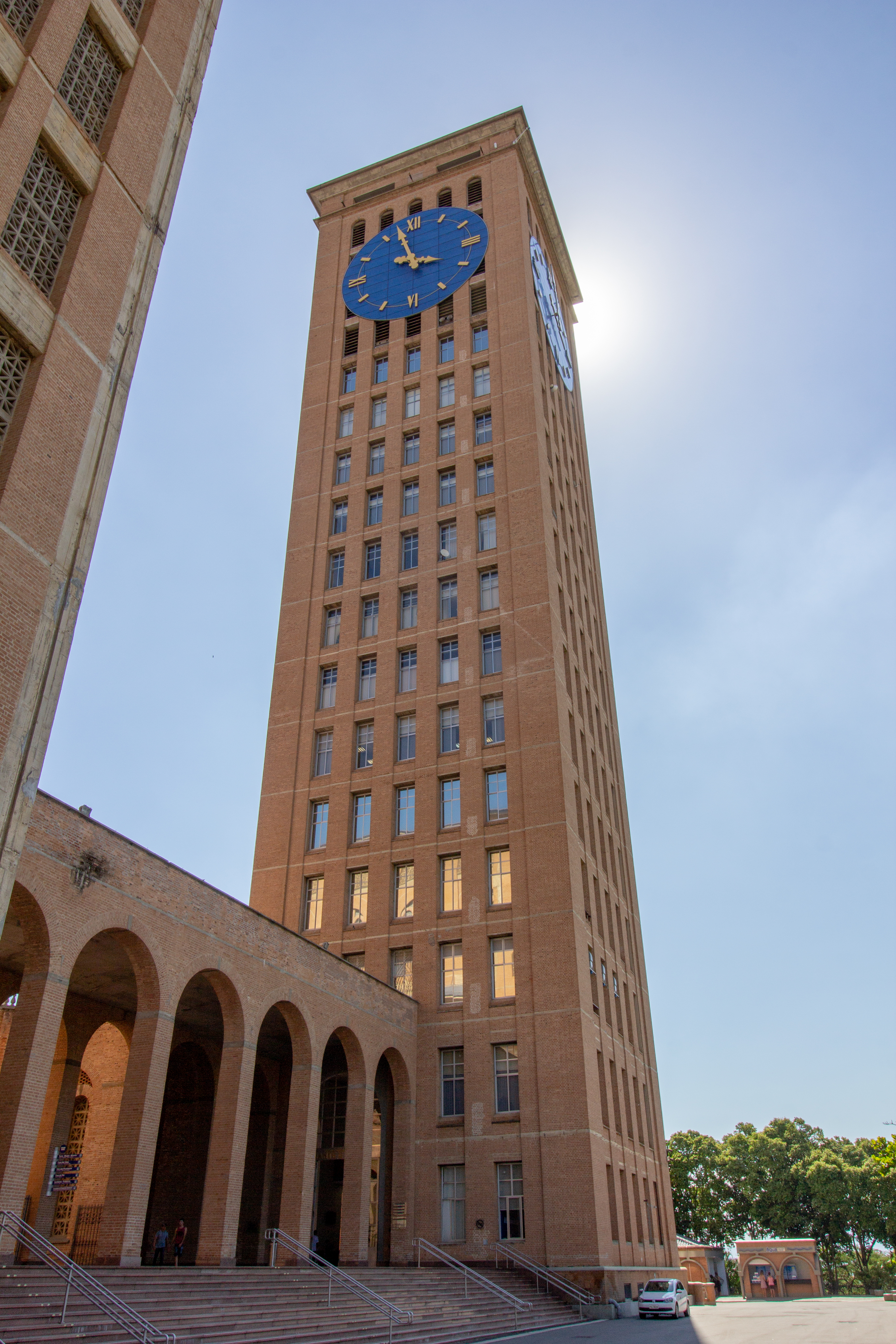
Basilica belfry

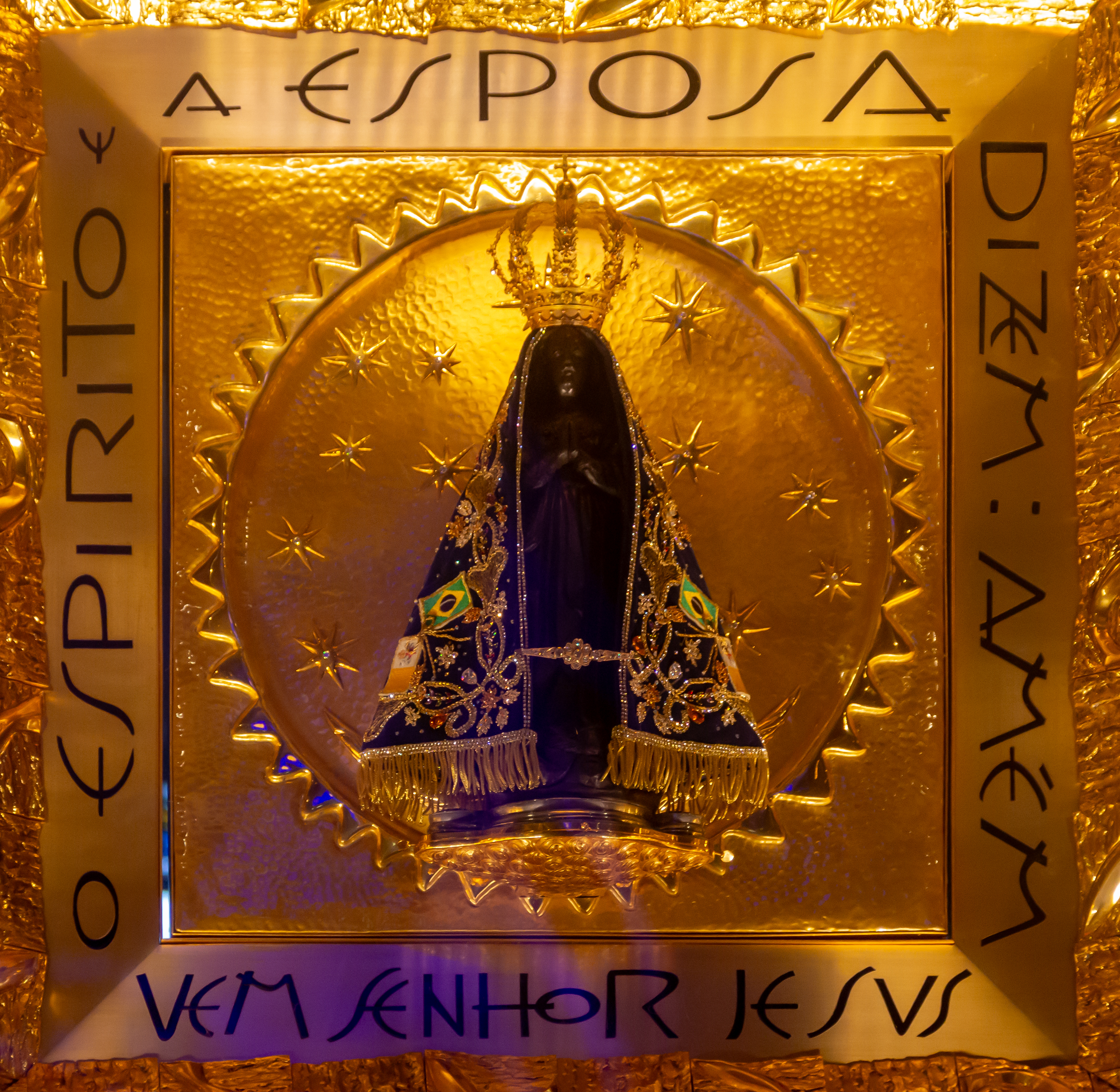
Original image of Our Lady of Aparecida in its permanent shrine inside the Basilica

In the Marian year of 1954, the architect Benedito Calixto Neto contracted for the design of the project and, in 1955, the construction of the new basilica started. The structure is in the Romanesque Revival style and takes the form of a Greek Cross, with arms 188 m (617 ft) in length and 183 m (600 ft) in width. The dome is 70 m (230 ft) high and the tower reaches a height of 109 m (358 ft). The basilica contains 25,000 m^{2} (270,000 sq ft) of internal space. The main church can accommodate 300,000 people in open air celebrations. The grounds contain a shopping mall, medical clinic, restaurants and a 272,000 m^{2} (2,930,000 sq ft) parking lot that can hold 4,000 buses and 6,000 cars.

On 4 July 1980, Pope John Paul II consecrated the sanctuary while the building was still under construction.

Pope Benedict XVI visited the church on 12 May 2007, during his apostolic journey to Brazil on the occasion of the Fifth General Conference of the Bishops of Latin America and the Caribbean. During his visit, the Pope awarded the shrine a Golden Rose.

On the occasion of World Youth Day, Pope Francis visited the basilica on 24 July 2013, celebrating Mass there.

As the main pilgrimage site for the Catholic Church in Brazil, the shrine was recognized by the Vatican as the cathedral of the Archdiocese of Aparecida on 12 November 2016, being since then the seat of the local archbishop.

=== Construction site ===
Basilica interior

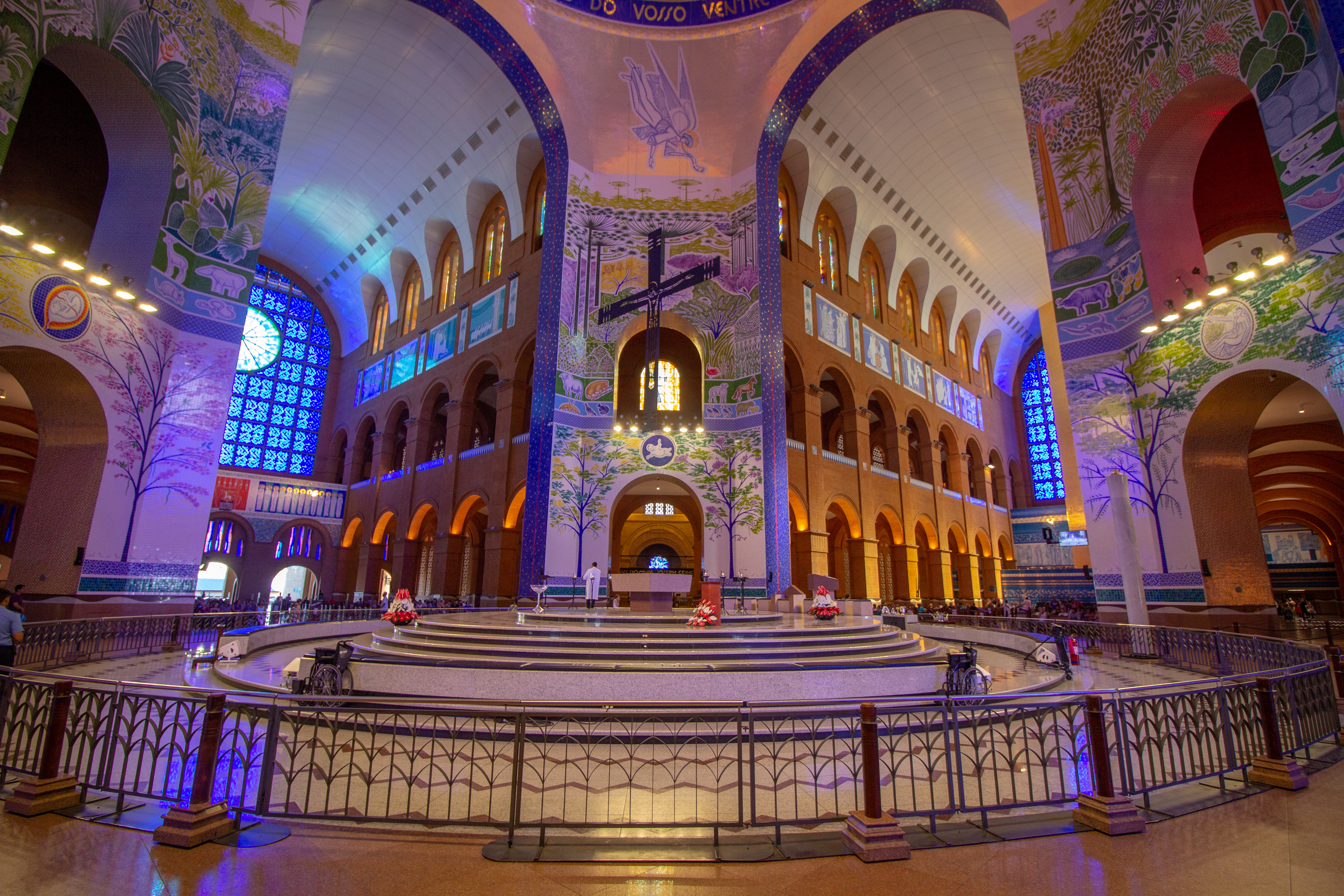
Main altar

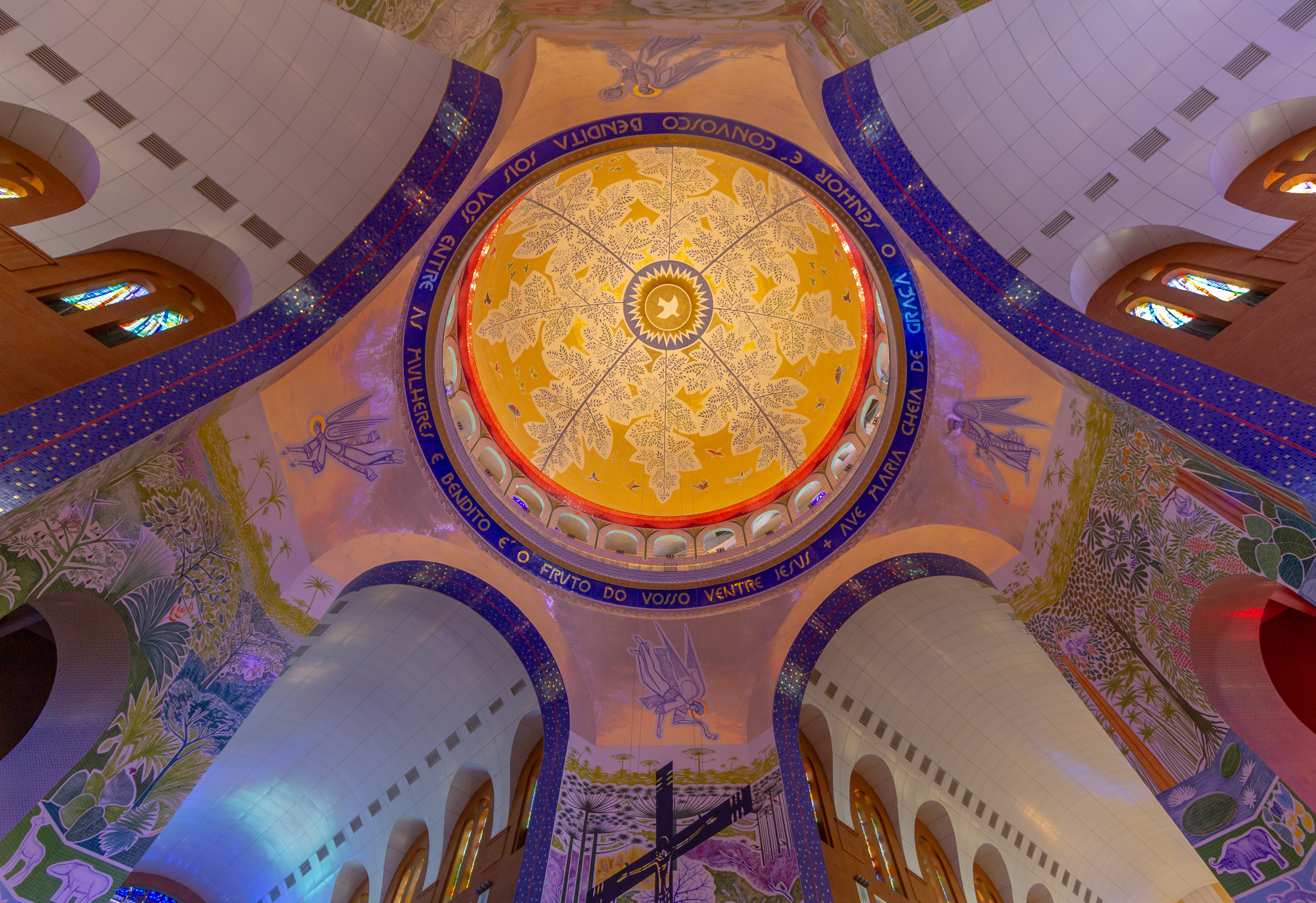
Cathedral ceiling

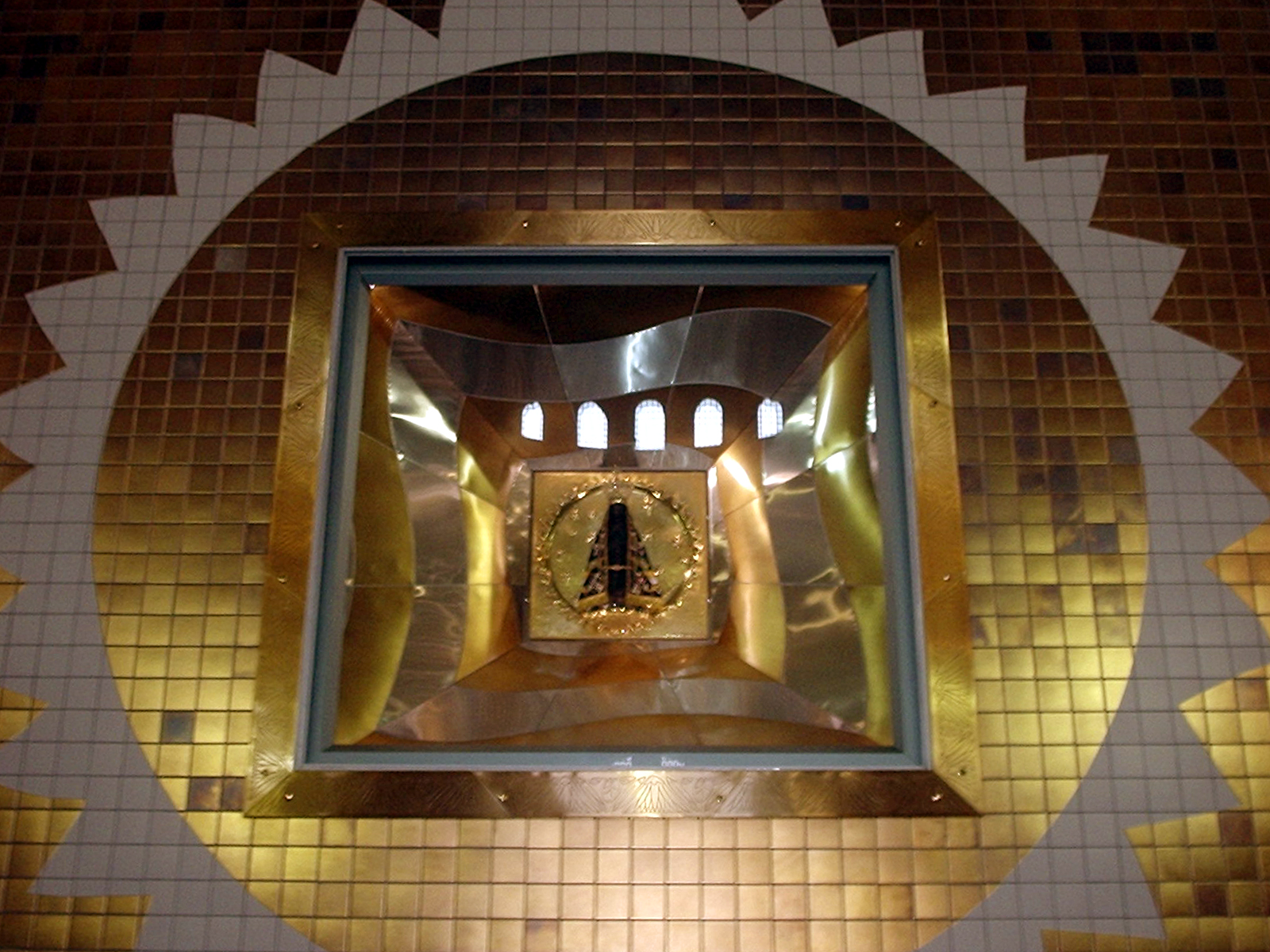
Original image of Our Lady of Aparecida

Also known as "Basílica Nova", the church is built on the "Pitas" hill, had its earthwork started in 1952, and finished in 1954. It started to be built on 11 November 1955, by the North side, and went on to build the Brasília Tower, which had its metallic structure donated by the then president Juscelino Kubitschek.

After the tower was finished, the works went to the central dome, then, in mid-1972, to the "Capela das Velas" and to the south side, then passing to the west and east, and the intermediate wings.

There is a walkway, called "Passarela da Fé", which connects the old church and the new basilica to which it is 392 m long, where there are people who, as a sign of faith, walk this stretch on their knees.

== Golden Roses ==
The Basilica of Aparecida has received the "Golden Rose" on three occasions:

- The first, from Pope Paul VI in 1967, on the occasion of the 250th anniversary jubilee of the appearance of the image of Our Lady Aparecida, with the delivery made on 15 August of that year.
- The second was blessed by Pope Benedict XVI, on 18 March 2007, Domingo Lætare , and delivered on 12 May of the same year, on the occasion of his visit to Brazil.
- The third was given by Pope Francis, on 9 October 2017, for the 300th anniversary of the appearance of the image.

== Infrastructure ==
The National Sanctuary has a network of infrastructure to receive people during regular days and festivities.

=== Lost and found ===
The lost objects are forwarded to the Pastoral Secretariat or to the Information Center, where they can be claimed with prior consultation. As for people who get lost from their companions or groups, there is the Meeting Point, which has trained staff and a sound system. However, the Shrine guides people towards organizing themselves at the family or pilgrimage level and adopting the Meeting Point as a common reference; it also guides towards visits with children and the elderly: identify them with a card containing a contact phone and information that may be relevant.

=== Accessibility ===
The National Sanctuary has access ramps to the temple and the basement, elevators for the visit to the Tower of Brasília viewpoint, rubberized and non-slip floors and ramps, 58 parking spaces for the elderly and people with disabilities, the bathrooms have an independent entrance for companions of people with disabilities, 45 special chairs, handrails at two heights.

=== Medical clinic ===
On the east side of the Basilica, next to the Passarela, there is an ambulatory for emergency or urgent assistance, it is a free service and has doctors, nurses and attendants.

=== Pilgrim support center ===
Popularly known as "Shoppinho", it was designed to provide convenience, leisure and welcome. It has a large food court with several types of restaurants, 380 stores in 36,000 square metres (390,000 sq ft), kiosks, baby changing facilities, bank tellers, drinking fountains, aquarium, meeting point and amusement park.

=== Parking ===
The Sanctuary has a parking lot with capacity for 2000 buses and 3000 private cars, and has mechanical assistance and insurance against theft or theft of vehicles, but is not responsible for belongings left in the vehicle.

=== Baby station ===
To favor mothers and fathers with young children, the Basilica offers two baby facilities. One of them is underground and contains 10 cribs and 16 changing tables and serves about 300 children a day. The other is located in the Support Center, on the south wing, and has microwaves, hygienic showers, changing tables, bottle warmers and other free services.

=== Property security ===
In order to provide a peaceful and safe visit, the Sanctuary has about 200 security agents. 400 military police, on average, reinforce in special seasons. With a modern camera system, 48 fixed and eight mobile equipment, with 24-hour monitoring, internal and external, they observe the Basilica. Also vehicles and motorcycles that make daytime rounds, inside the walls of the National Shrine, collaborate with the surveillance.

=== Utilities ===
In the basement of the Basilica, there is the "Sala das Promessas", the baby station, bathrooms, free drinking water, "Salão dos Romeiros" (dining area) and booking of masses. At the Brasília Tower, the viewpoint (100m high), the "Nossa Senhora Aparecida Museum" and the information center. At the Support Center, the meeting point and information center. In the external sector, there is the Chapel of Baptisms, the Press Room, the drivers' room, property security and the ambulatory.

== Men's Rosary (Terço dos Homens) Annual Pilgrimage ==
Every year, in February, thousands of men from Brazil who engage in the Men's Rosary (Portuguese: Terço dos Homens) movement gather at the basilica to pray and attend Mass. They are guided by the Archbishop of Juiz de Fora (Minas Gerais), Gil Antônio Moreira, who heads the movement according to the Brazilian Episcopal Conference (CNBB). Nationwide, the movement has two million worshippers.

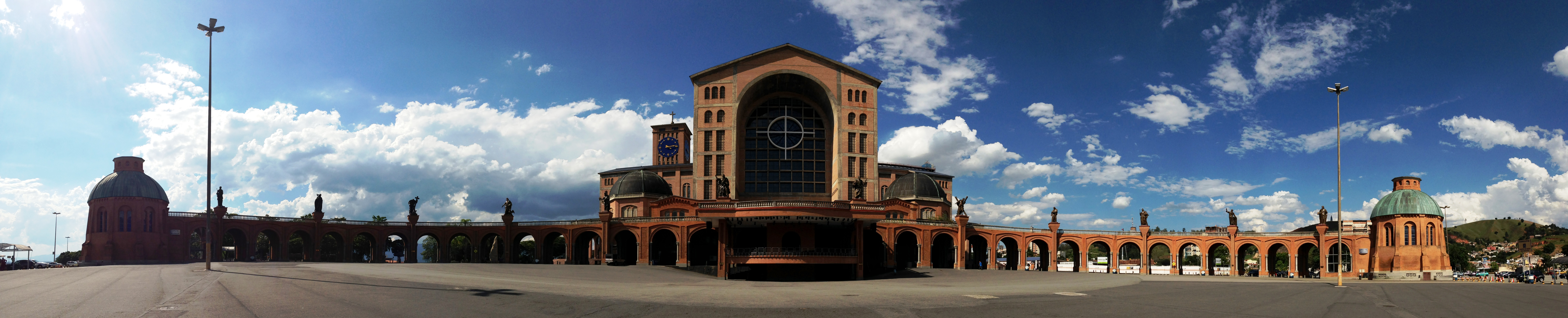
Panoramic View

== See also ==
- List of Christian pilgrimage sites
- List of largest church buildings in the world
- List of tallest domes
- Roman Catholic Marian churches
