= Aparecida =

- Municipality
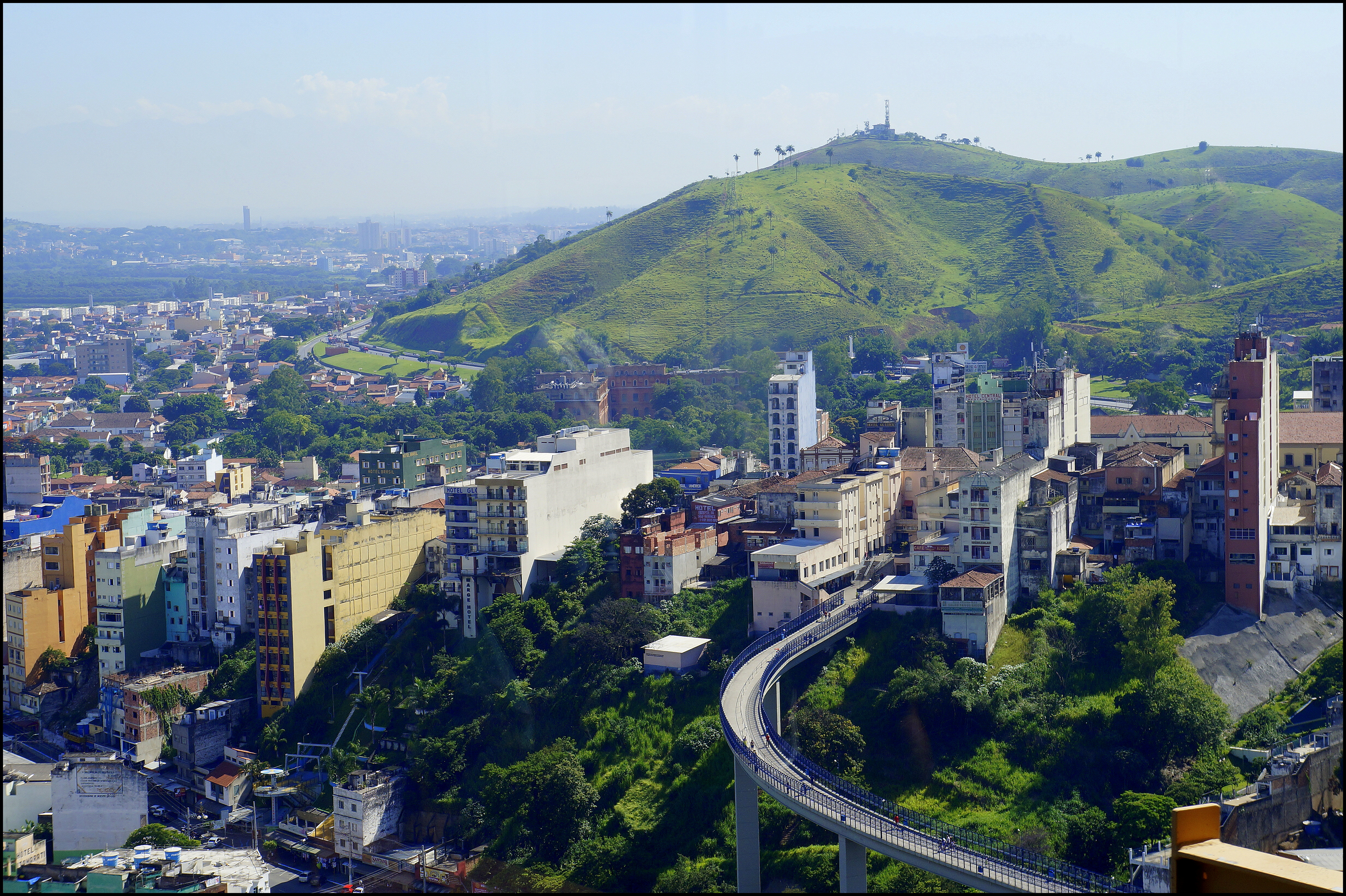
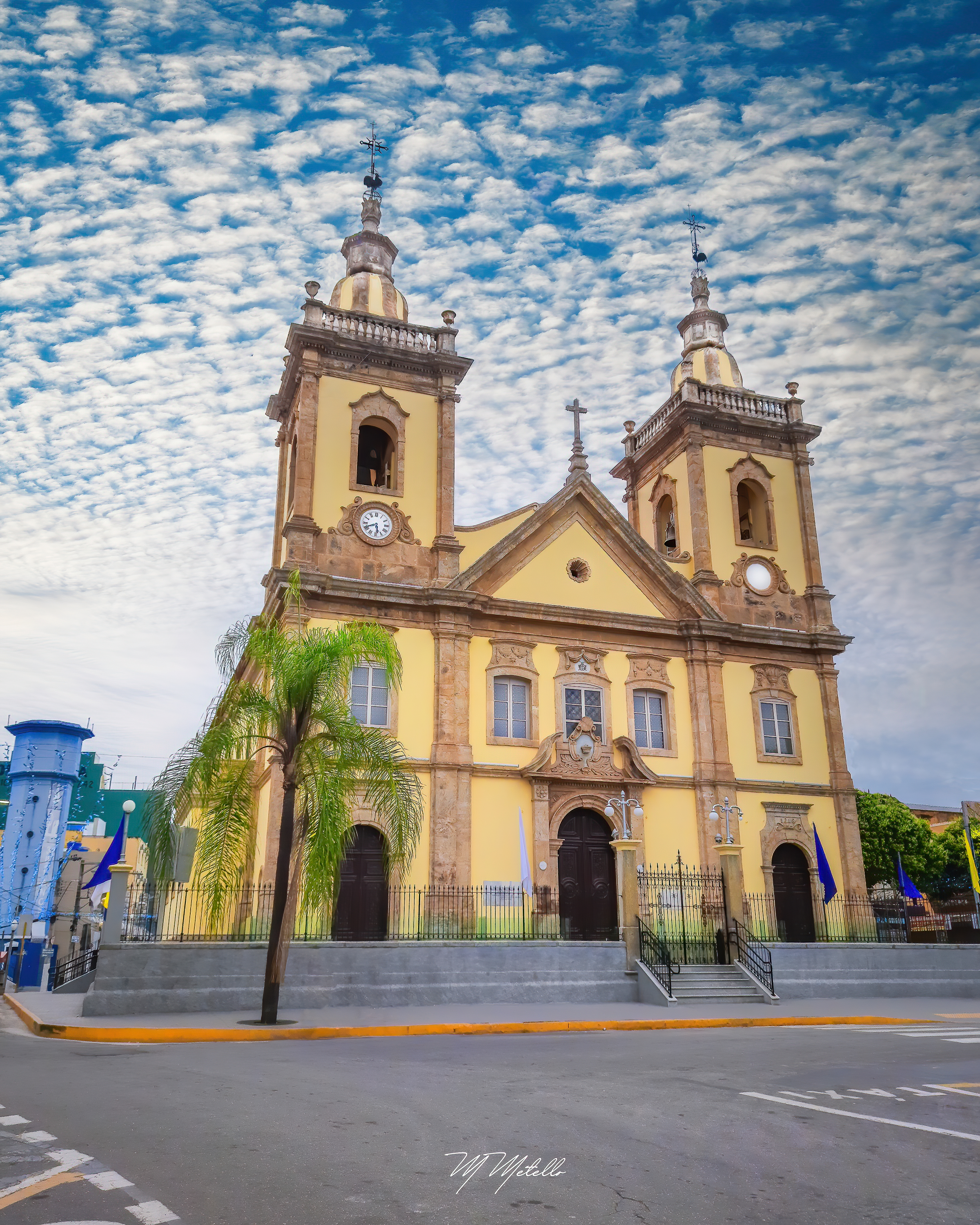
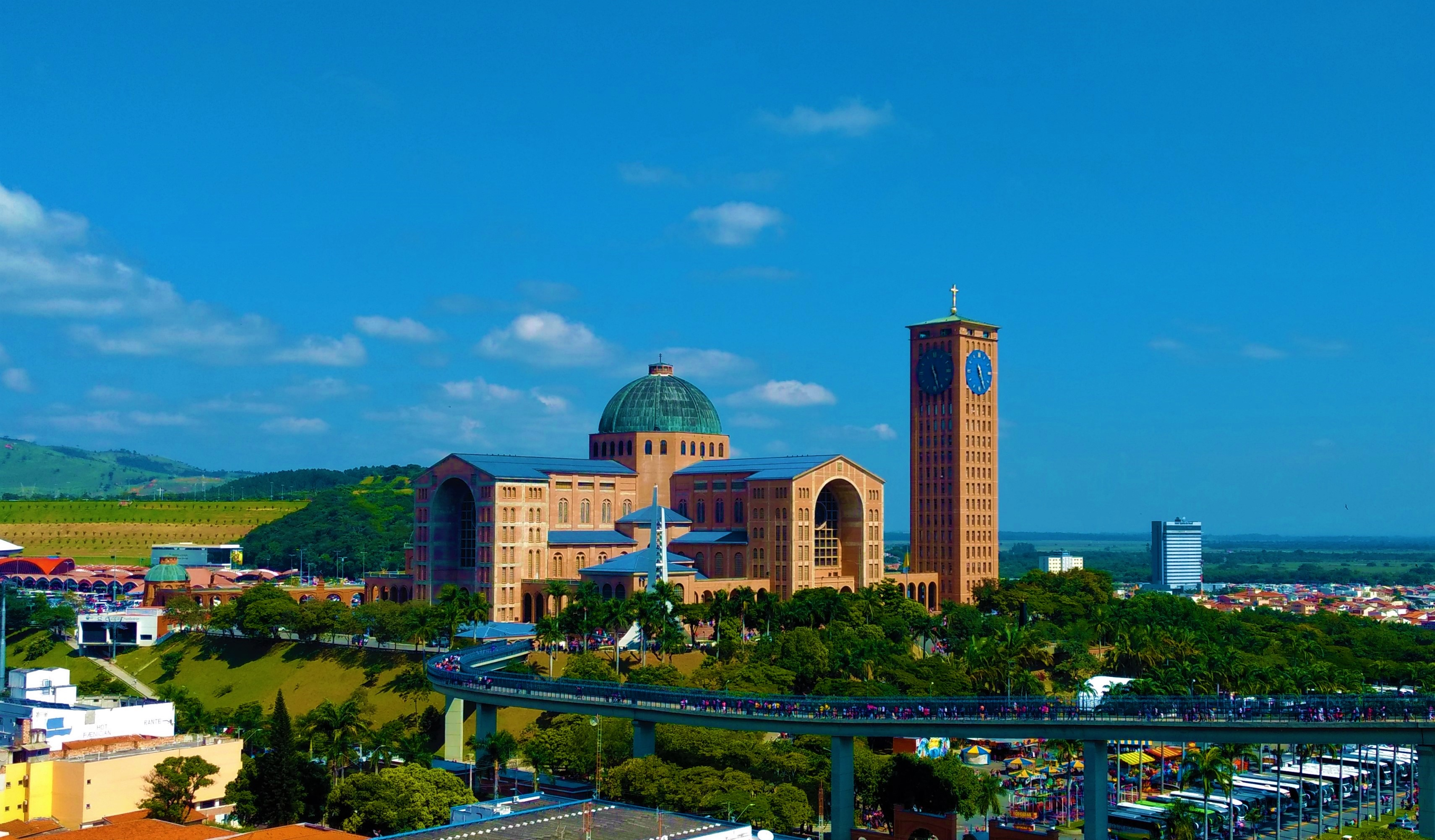
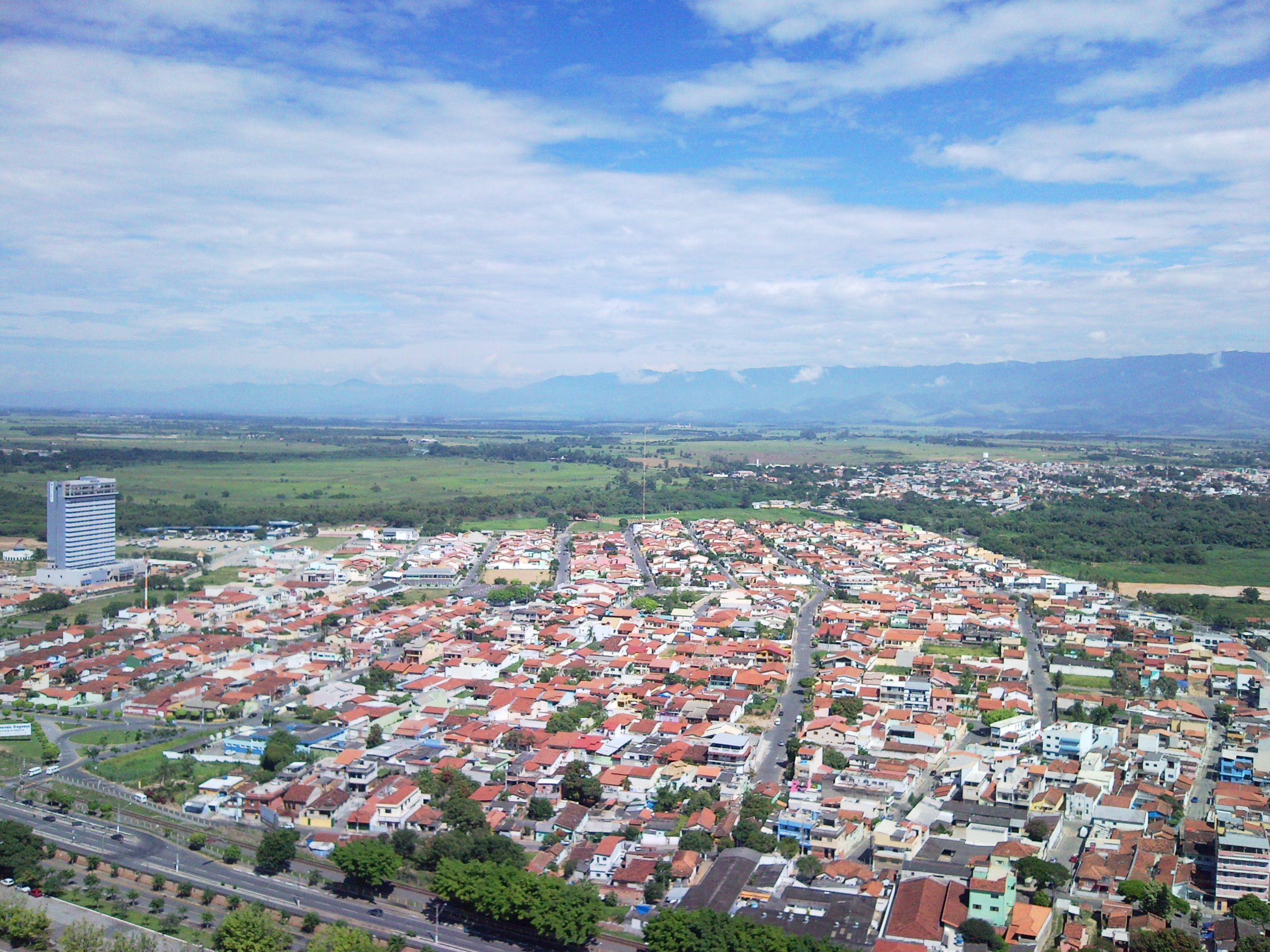
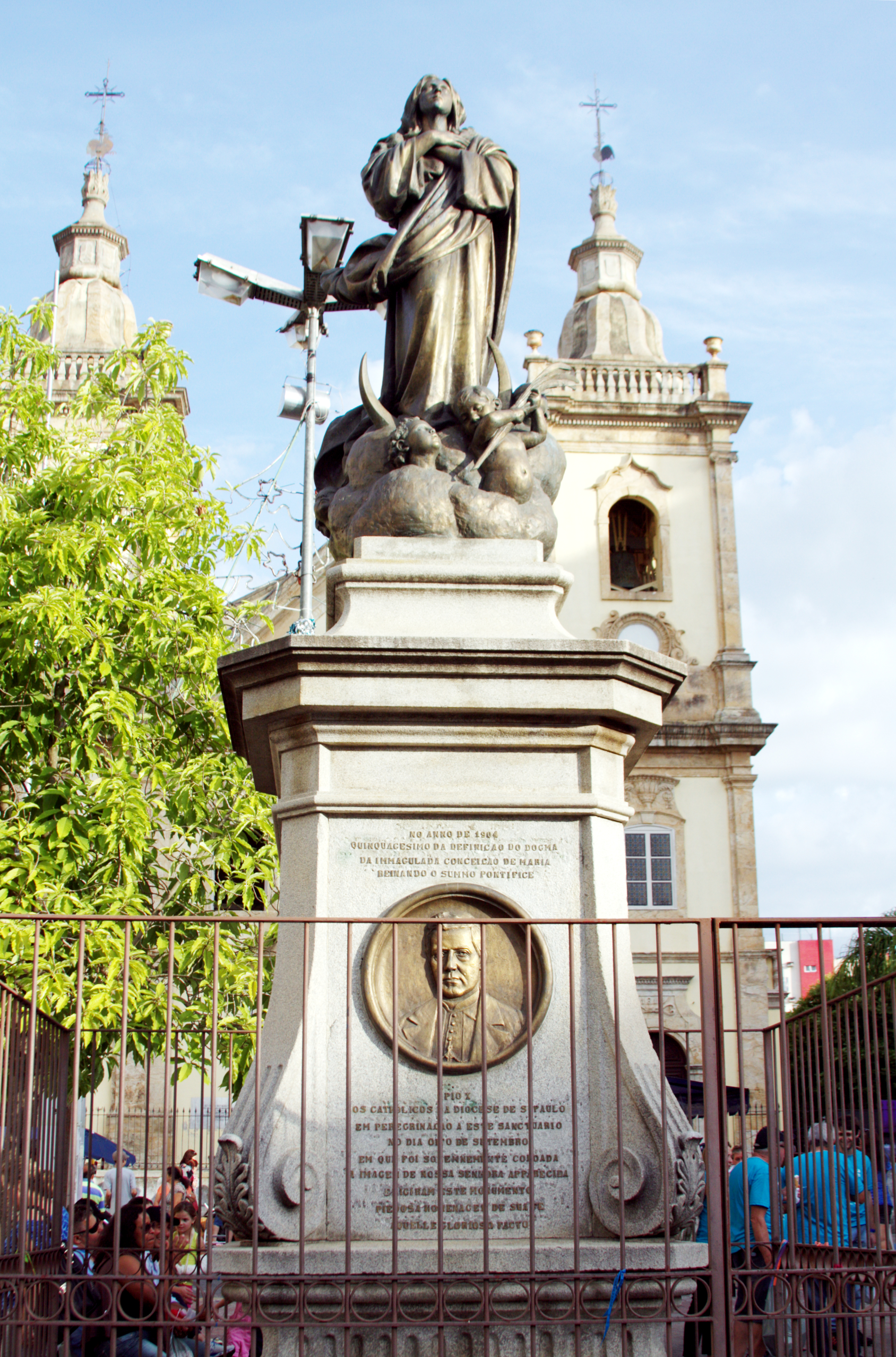
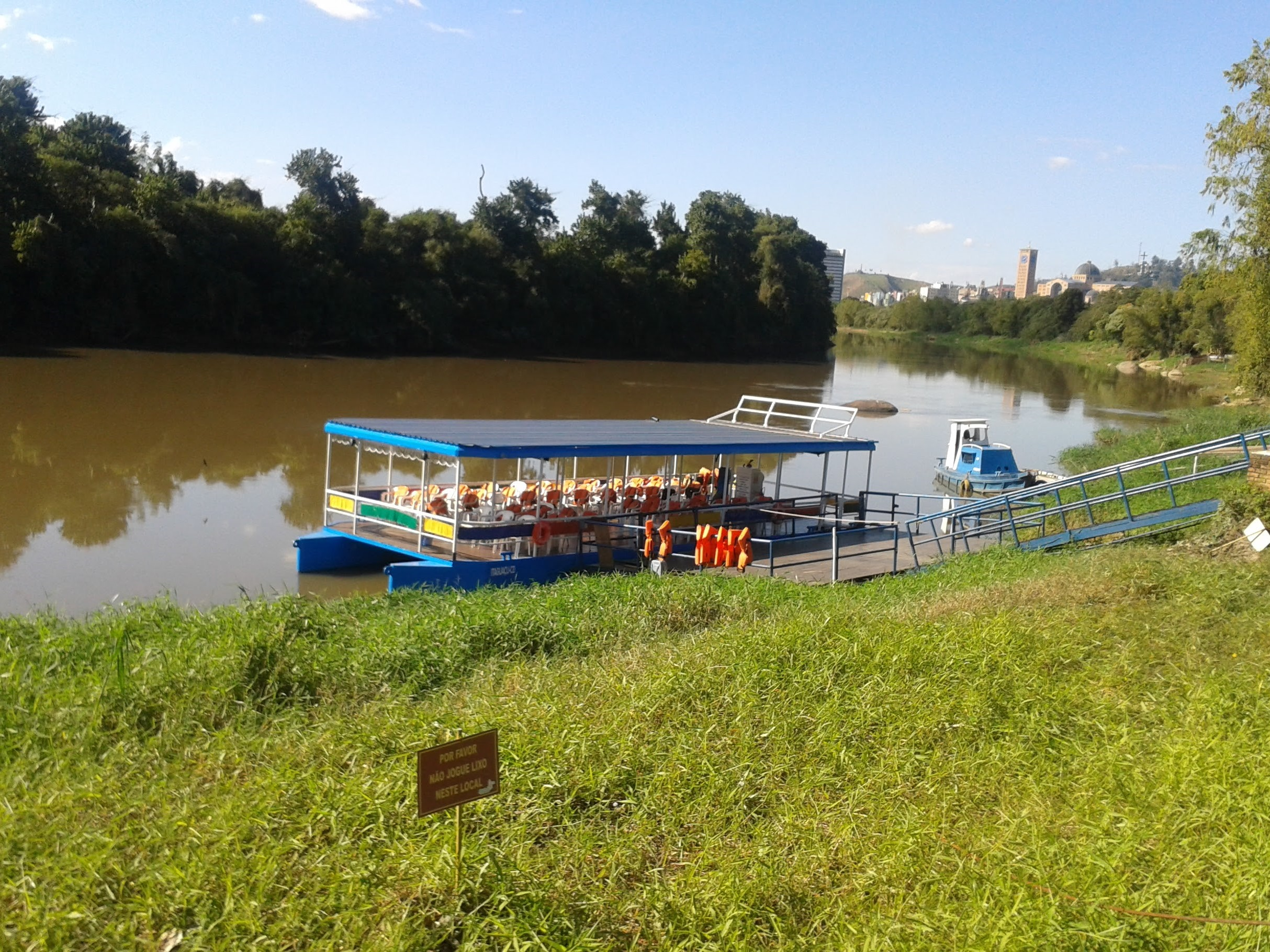
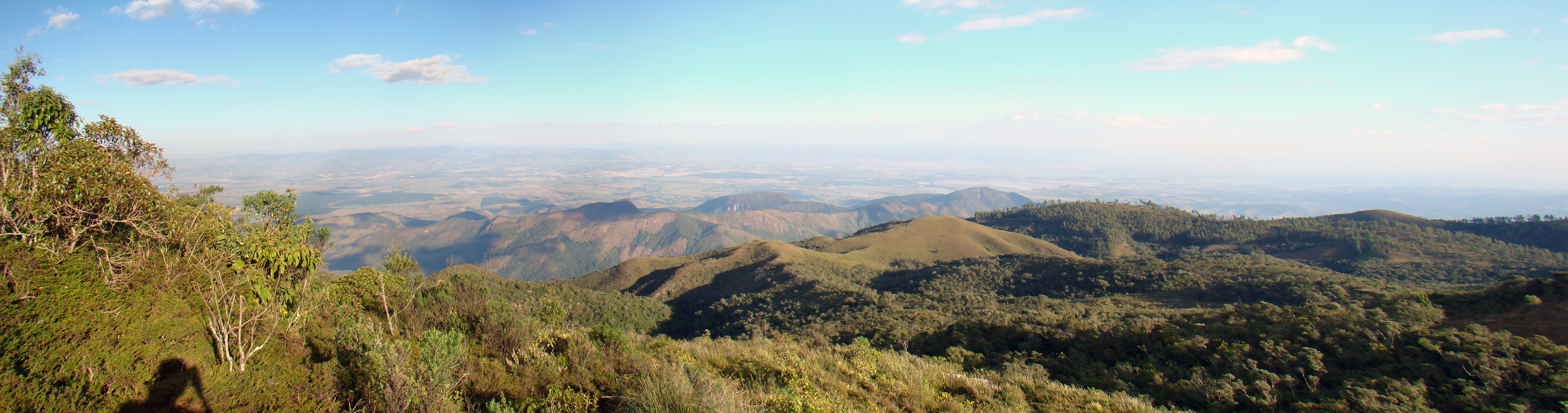
- Panoramic view of Aparecida Historic Basilica of Our Lady of Aparecida Basilica of Our Lady of Aparecida Jardim Paraíba neighborhood and Potim in the background Statue of Immaculate Rio Paraiba do Sul Paraíba Valley seen from Itapeva Peak

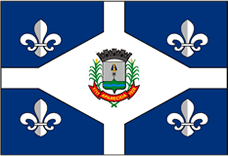
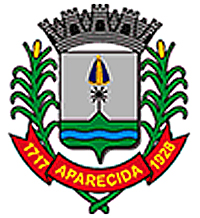
- Flag Coat of arms

- Location in São Paulo state

- Location in Brazil
- Coordinates: 22°50′50″S 45°13′48″W
- Country: Brazil
- Region: Southeast Brazil
- State: São Paulo
- Metropolitan Region: Vale do Paraíba e Litoral Norte

Area
  - Total: 121.08 km^{2} (46.75 sq mi)
- Elevation: 542 m (1,778 ft)

Population (2020)
  - Total: 36,185
  - Density: 298.85/km^{2} (774.02/sq mi)
- Time zone: UTC−3 (BRT)
- Postal code: 12570-000
- Website: www.aparecida.sp.gov.br

Aparecida is a Brazilian municipality in the state of São Paulo. It is located in the fertile valley of the River Paraíba do Sul on the southern (right) bank. It is part of the Metropolitan Region of Vale do Paraíba e Litoral Norte. The population is 36,185 (2020 est.) in an area of 121.08 km^{2} (46.75 sq mi). The municipality is sometimes referred as Aparecida do Norte.

== History ==
Once part of the municipality of Guaratinguetá, it was emancipated in 1928.

== Demographics ==
Historical population (municipality)
Year	Population	%±
1940	9,156	—
1950	15,088	64.8%
1960	19,696	30.5%
1970	24,669	25.2%
1980	29,344	19.0%
1991	33,247	13.3%
2000	34,904	5.0%
2010	35,007	0.3%
2022	32,569	−7.0%

== Geography ==
Aparecida is located 168 km northeast of São Paulo and 240 km west of Rio de Janeiro.

With an average altitude of 544 meters, and elevations varying from 525 to 620 meters, Aparecida has a hot climate with dry winters. Recorded temperatures are a maximum of 35 °C, a minimum of −1 °C and an average of 22 °C.

== Main sights ==
It is home to and named after the Basilica of the National Shrine of Our Lady of Aparecida, the patron saint of Brazil, declared so by Pope Pius XI in 1929. Pope Benedict XVI delivered a speech there in May, 2007.

It now depends exclusively on tourism generated by the devotees surrounding the statue of the Virgin. Aparecida receives more than 7 million tourists a year making it the most popular religious pilgrimage site in Latin America.

These pilgrims come to visit the Basilica containing the statue of Our Lady of Aparecida. This statue, thought to have been found in the Paraíba River in October 1717, is made of clay and measures 40 centimeters in height. The dark colour was produced by the years of exposure to candles and lamps around the altar. In 1978 it was attacked and reduced to hundreds of fragments which were meticulously put back together by specialists from the São Paulo Museum of Art.

Aparecida was the source of a proposal endorsed by Pope Francis in 2020 to establish a collaborative ministry among the local churches of the various South American countries in the Amazon basin, with differentiated priorities.

== Media ==
In telecommunications, the city was served by Companhia de Telecomunicações do Estado de São Paulo until 1975, when it began to be served by Telecomunicações de São Paulo. In July 1998, this company was acquired by Telefónica, which adopted the Vivo brand in 2012.

The company is currently an operator of cell phones, fixed lines, internet (fiber optics/4G) and television (satellite and cable).

== See also ==
- List of municipalities in São Paulo
