= Lausanne (disambiguation) =

Lausanne is a city in Switzerland.

Lausanne may also refer to:

== Places ==
- Lausanne (district), a district in the canton of Vaud, Switzerland
- Lausanne Township, Pennsylvania, a township in the U.S.
- Lausanne Collegiate School, a school in Memphis, Tennessee, U.S.
- Lausanne Hall, a dormitory at Willamette University in Oregon, U.S.
- University of Lausanne, a Swiss university established in the 16th century

== Conferences ==
- Lausanne Congress (1867), the second congress of the International Workingmen's Association
- Lausanne Congress of Supreme Councils of 1875, a gathering of Scottish Rites Masons
- Conference of Lausanne, a 1922–1923 conference to replace the Treaty of Sèvres
  - Treaty of Lausanne, a 1923 peace treaty signed in Lausanne, Switzerland
- Lausanne Conference of 1932, that resulted in an agreement to suspend World War I reparations
- Lausanne Conference of 1949, convened by the United Nations Conciliation Commission for Palestine
- First International Congress on World Evangelization, a 1974 conference in Lausanne, Switzerland
  - Lausanne Covenant, a Christian religious manifesto produced at the Lausanne Congress
  - Lausanne Committee for World Evangelization, known as the Lausanne Movement, which grew from this conference

== Other uses ==
- Lausanne (ship), a 19th-century U.S. ship, sailed on by George Abernethy
