= International Congress on World Evangelization =

International Congress on World Evangelization may refer to:

- The First International Congress on World Evangelization held in 1974 in Lausanne, Switzerland
- The Second International Congress on World Evangelization held in 1989 in Manila, the Philippines
- The Third Lausanne Congress on World Evangelization held in 2010 in Cape Town, South Africa
