= Lausanne Conference =

Lausanne Conference or Conference of Lausanne may refer to:

- Lausanne Conference of 1922–1923, a peace conference to write a new treaty with Turkey
- Lausanne Conference on Faith and Order, 1927 ecumenical conference
- Lausanne Conference of 1932, a conference representing the end of the reparations that related to the 1919 Paris Peace Conference
- Lausanne Conference of 1949, related to Palestinian-Jewish negotiations and the 1949 Armistice Agreements
- First International Congress on World Evangelization, the Lausanne Conference in 1974

== See also ==
- Lausanne Congress of Supreme Councils of 1875, a Freemasonry conference
