= Lausanne Congress =

The name Lausanne Congress may refer to the following international conclaves held in Lausanne, Switzerland:

- Lausanne Congress (1867) (September 2–8, 1867), the second international assembly of the International Workingmen's Association
- Lausanne Congress of Supreme Councils of 1875 (September 6–22, 1875), a gathering of Scottish Rite Freemasons
- First International Congress on World Evangelization (July 16–24, 1974), a gathering of evangelical Christians

== See also ==
- Conference of Lausanne (Nov. 1922-Feb. 4, 1923), a meeting between Turkey and representatives of Great Britain, France, and Italy to replace the Treaty of Sèvres
- Lausanne Conference of 1932 (June 16 – July 9, 1932), a gathering of representatives of Great Britain, Germany, and France which suspended war reparations
- Lausanne Conference of 1949 (April 27-Sept. 12, 1949), a multilateral gathering conducted by the United Nations Conciliation Commission for Palestine
