= Nguyễn Thị Thuấn =

Late Christian missionary

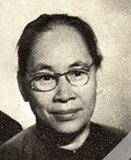
- Born: February 5, 1916; Mỹ Trà , Cao Lãnh district, Đồng Tháp, French Cochinchina, French Indochina
- Died: January 4, 2015 (aged 98); California, United States
- Other name: Bà Mục sư Phạm Văn Năm
- Organization: Hội Thánh Tin Lành Việt Nam
- Known for: Pioneer female leader in the Vietnamese Baptist/Evangelical Church
- Title: Women’s General Commissioner of the Protestant Church of Vietnam
- Children: 10, Phạm Quang Khiêm (son)

Nguyễn Thị Thuấn (February 5, 1916 – January 4, 2015) was a prominent Christian missionary and educator in Vietnam. She dedicated her life to spreading the gospel, initially influenced by missionary Irving Stebbins in 1922. In 1938, she married Phạm Văn Năm, and together they embarked on missionary work, including Bible translation efforts for the K’ho people in Vietnam's Central Highlands. Thuấn was deeply involved in the Evangelical Church of Vietnam, where she promoted women’s roles in ministry and, in 1974, represented South Vietnam at the First International Congress on World Evangelization in Switzerland. She also studied Library Management at the Union Biblical Seminary in India and worked to support international mission efforts. Thuấn continued her ministry until her later years, leaving a significant legacy in both local and international Christian communities.

== Early life and Spiritual Awakening ==
Nguyễn Thị Thuấn was born in 1916 in Mỹ Trà village, Cao Lãnh district, Đồng Tháp province, French Cochinchina (now part of southern Vietnam). She was born into a middle-class family, and her parents were not particularly religious. Her father, Phạm Văn Lộc, was involved in gambling, and her mother, Trần Thị Kiều, managed the household, supporting traditional cultural performances such as cải lương. Due to her parents' limited view on education, Thuấn was only allowed to attend school until the end of elementary school, despite her obvious intelligence. She often accompanied her grandfather to watch people play cards and learned to play various games like scratch cards, poker, and tứ sắc. She also absorbed many folk stories, which were part of her cultural upbringing.

At the age of 6, Thuấn was first introduced to Christianity when her grandmother took her to a Protestant church. At that time, she didn’t understand much of the services and often fell asleep during prayers and lectures, but she enjoyed the gatherings because of the people and the lively atmosphere. This exposure left a lasting impression, and the seeds of faith were planted in her heart. By the age of 10, she expressed a desire to pray and accept Christ, but her grandmother advised her to wait, since her parents were not yet believers. In 1927, after much prayer and encouragement from the missionary Nguyễn Tân, she formally accepted Christ and was baptized by Pastor Robinson.

=== Conversion and Faith Journey ===
As a teenager, Thuấn shared her faith with friends, relatives, and elders, although she faced mockery and criticism for her strong commitment, with some calling her a "religious fanatic." These early challenges deeply discouraged her. However, a pivotal moment came on January 15, 1932, during a revival meeting at the Cao Lãnh church led by Pastor D.J. Jeffrey and Pastor Nguyễn Hữu Khanh. The sermon on the spiritual discouragement of the Israelites profoundly impacted her, leading her to a renewed dedication to God through fasting and prayer.

== Calling to Ministry and Marriage ==
In October 1934, she attended another revival conference in Sa Đéc where she was inspired by missionary reports from the Central Highlands. Feeling a divine calling, she pledged her life to missionary work. However, a significant obstacle was that the Đà Nẵng Bible School (Trường Thánh Kinh Đà Nẵng) did not accept unmarried female students at the time.

Through a providential turn of events at the same conference, she was invited to recite Psalm 23 in front of the congregation, catching the attention of a Christian family seeking a wife for their son, a Bible student named Phạm Văn Năm. This introduction led to their marriage, and through this union, she gained access to theological education.

From 1935 to 1940, she and her husband studied and ministered across several churches in Vietnam. They trained at the Đà Nẵng Bible School (1935–1936), did fieldwork in Trà Ôn (1936–1938), served at Phú Nhuận Church in Saigon (1938–1939), and returned for a final year at Bible school before serving in Bình Long, Châu Đốc (1940–1941).

== The Return to the Central Highlands ==
=== Resuming the Missionary Calling (1947) ===
In March 1947, Nguyễn Thị Thuấn and Pham Van Nam learned that missionary work in the Central Highlands could resume after the disruptions caused by World War II and the early stages of the First Indochina War. Eager to continue their calling, they applied to return to the region, and their request was promptly approved. By April, they were assigned to Bao Loc, a remote town in Lam Dong Province, where they would once again serve among the ethnic peoples. During the turbulent years of conflict between France and the Viet Minh, the couple had relocated to Vĩnh Long, from 1943-1947 to serve, where one of their sons, Pham Quang Khiem, was born. It was during this time that they had the opportunity to work alongside fellow pastors such as Pastor Phạm Xuân Tín, Pastor Hà Sol, Evangelist Jackson, and Pastor Lê Văn Trầm.

The couple's journey to Bao Loc was physically demanding and spiritually heavy, yet it reaffirmed their lifelong commitment to serving God in this challenging area. Upon arrival, they found a community still recovering from the ravages of war and displacement. Bao Loc, surrounded by dense forests and rugged mountain paths, had minimal infrastructure and few resources. However, it had a profound spiritual need, prompting the Pham family to begin their work by rebuilding relationships with local tribal groups, particularly the K’Ho and Ma people. Their efforts centered around reestablishing the presence of the church through small group worship and home visits.

=== Daily Life and Ministry Challenges ===
Adapting to life in the Central Highlands was not easy. The couple faced numerous challenges, including nearly impassable roads, rare communication with the outside world, and the prevalence of disease. Harsh weather, poor nutrition, and long periods of isolation tested their resolve. During the wet season of 1948, flooding cut off their mission station for several weeks, leaving them to rely solely on prayer, foraging, and the generosity of local villagers.

Despite these hardships, their ministry began to thrive. Pham Van Nam traveled on foot or horseback to visit villages, preach the Gospel, and train new believers. He emphasized the importance of raising local leaders, believing that the most sustainable faith communities would be led by the people themselves. Nguyễn Thị Thuấn focused on nurturing women and children, teaching Scripture, and launching practical programs in sewing and hygiene to meet everyday needs. She also began translating Bible verses and hymns into the K’Ho language to help the people connect more deeply with their faith.

== Ministry and Family Life ==
=== Return to Da Lat and a New Phase of Ministry ===
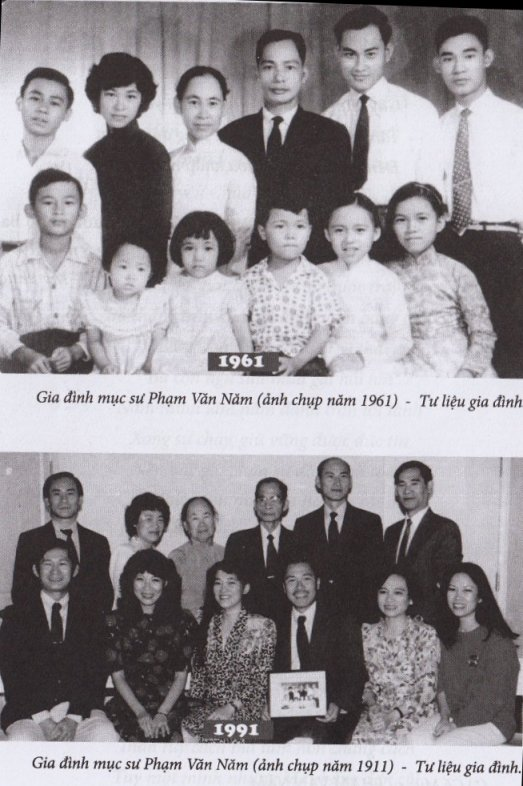
Pham Van Nam family

In June 1947, Nguyễn Thị Thuấn and her husband, accompanied by their four children, returned to Da Lat in June 1947, continuing the work of earlier missionaries such as Pastor Nguyen Van Tam and Evangelist Trinh An Moo, who had previously worked with Rev. Herbert Jackson in Lam Dong. This marked a pivotal chapter in their service to God and the ethnic peoples of the Central Highlands. Shortly after their return, Evangelist Trinh An Moo died, and Pastor Nguyen Van Tam was transferred to the South due to health issues.

With renewed dedication, the couple immersed themselves in language study, spending six hours a day relearning K’Ho. Nguyễn Thị Thuấn’s determination to serve the ethnic people spiritually led her to persist alongside her husband. Within six months, they were able to communicate with K’Ho speakers without interpreters, laying the foundation for their long-term effectiveness in ministry.

=== Ordination and Bilingual Support ===
In June 1948, after twelve years of dedicated service, Pham Van Nam was ordained as a pastor in Saigon, marking a significant milestone in his ministry. Although Nguyễn Thị Thuấn could not attend the ceremony due to financial and logistical constraints, her contributions were essential to their mission. She worked alongside her husband in supporting the Vietnamese church in Da Lat, collaborating closely with Pastor Duy Cach Lam. Her unwavering commitment to both ethnic missions and church support played a crucial role in their shared mission to serve the Lord.

=== Translating Scripture and Promoting Literacy ===
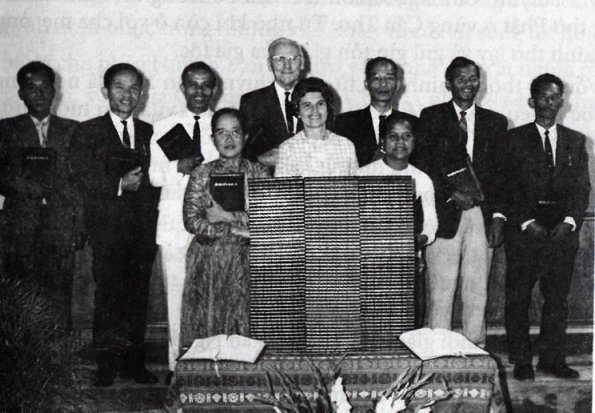
New Testament Bible Dedication Ceremony in K’Ho

The Pham couple recognized the importance of making Scripture accessible in the heart language of the K’Ho people. Building on the efforts of earlier missionaries and K’Ho believers, they contributed to the long-term project of translating the New Testament into K’Ho. Nguyễn Thị Thuấn played a pivotal role in addressing the challenge of literacy within the K’Ho community. She dedicated herself to teaching children, youth, and Bible school students how to read and write K’Ho, empowering many believers to engage directly with the Bible. Her efforts not only contributed to the spread of literacy but also led to the introduction of K’Ho in local schools, ensuring the continued growth of the faith in the region. Meanwhile, her husband, Pastor Pham Van Nam, focused on translating the book of Peter, which resulted in the publication of the complete K’Ho New Testament in 1961.

=== Music, Evangelism, and Leadership in Ministry ===
Music was a central aspect of the Phams' ministry, with Nguyễn Thị Thuấn playing a pivotal role in its development. She led music instruction for K’Ho Christians, helping them develop skills in harmonizing and singing. In collaboration with her husband, she also contributed to the creation of a 250-hymn collection for K’Ho Christians, translating over 100 hymns from the Vietnamese Protestant Hymnal. Her dedication to ministry extended to translating The Life of Christ into K’Ho, facilitating a deeper understanding of Jesus' teachings.

Nguyễn Thị Thuấn's evangelical efforts extended beyond Da Lat, as she traveled to remote villages to share the Gospel. In 1951, despite facing illness, she undertook a challenging multi-week journey to spread the Christian message in Lieng Bon, Da Blah, Pang Pung, Pang Tieng, and Tiah Soh. Her preaching ministry was a notable aspect of her leadership, as she served not only as an interpreter but also as a preacher, especially during times when her husband was absent due to illness. Her ability to preach and teach was a powerful example of the significant role women played in missions, even at a time when such leadership opportunities were rare for Vietnamese Protestant women.

Beyond her ministry work, Nguyễn Thị Thuấn managed her household with devotion. Between 1947 and 1960, she gave birth to six more children, balancing motherhood with her spiritual responsibilities. While her husband was often away on ministry trips, she continued to lead her children with wisdom and instill a strong faith within her family, remaining deeply involved in the ongoing missionary work.

=== Growth of the Church Community ===
By the early 1950s, the Pham family's persistent efforts began to yield tangible results. The Bao Loc mission station had grown into a thriving hub of Christian activity. Regular worship services were held, local leaders took on preaching roles, and several ethnic believers assumed responsibility for shepherding nearby communities. The Pham family's home became a center of hospitality and a training ground for young converts interested in ministry.

During this period, Nguyễn Thị Thuấn composed new hymns in both Vietnamese and the K’Ho language. These songs played a key role in spreading the Gospel, even among those who could not read. Her music ministry was instrumental in creating a faith expression that was deeply Vietnamese yet accessible to the ethnic communities they served.

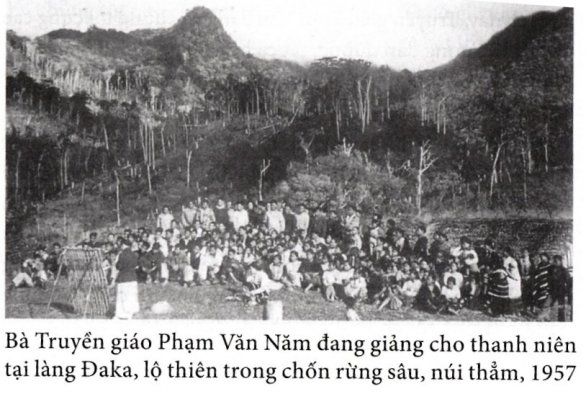
Nguyen Thi Thuan preaching to young people in Daka village 1957

=== Preparing the Next Generation ===
As they grew older, Nguyễn Thị Thuấn and her husband became increasingly focused on ensuring the sustainability of their work. They began mentoring younger missionaries and local workers, encouraging the Evangelical Church of Vietnam to allocate more resources and personnel to the Central Highlands. Their reports and experiences shaped the training curriculum for future missionaries, especially those called to serve in rural and ethnic areas.

After years of physically demanding ministry, the couple retired from full-time service in the highlands in 1953 and returned to Saigon. However, even in retirement, they continued to support the church through advisory roles, mentorship, and teaching. Their advocacy for mission work among Vietnam’s ethnic peoples remained a cornerstone of their ministry.

== A New Chapter: From Mission Fields to Seminary (1960) ==
In 1960, after 15 years of ministry to ethnic communities across Vietnam, Nguyễn Thị Thuấn and her husband faced a major life change when illness forced him to leave Da Lat and move to Nha Trang for recovery. During this period, as the Vietnamese Protestant Church was establishing the Nha Trang Theological Seminary, Nguyễn Thị Thuấn took on an increasingly prominent role in supporting her husband's work and in contributing to the community's spiritual life. As Pastor Phạm Văn Năm was invited to join the seminary faculty, Nguyễn Thị Thuấn continued her own work, providing leadership and support to both her family and the broader ministry, while also becoming more involved in the educational and spiritual needs of the church.

=== An Unexpected Path ===
As Pastor Năm settled into his new role, his wife, Nguyễn Thị Thuấn, volunteered as the seminary librarian, organizing and managing the books that had been transferred from Đà Nẵng. In July1961, she was selected to attend a specialized library science training course at Union Biblical Seminary in Pune, India, from October 1961 to March 1962. Despite her concerns about language barriers, age, and the challenges of leaving her young children, she trusted in God’s provision and accepted the call. During her time in India, not only did Nguyễn Thị Thuấn complete her training, but she also became active in evangelism—visiting and teaching at numerous churches, and witnessing to Indian Christians. She also had the opportunity to visit the "Mukti Mission" in Pune, a historic evangelical mission founded by Pandita Ramabai, revered as a pioneer of the Indian church and champion of women’s empowerment.

=== Pioneering Women’s Ministry and National Leadership ===
During her time abroad, Nguyễn Thị Thuấn’s testimony and teaching left a lasting impression on Indian congregations. Upon returning to Vietnam in March 1962, she resumed ministry with renewed energy, teaching annual Bible courses at churches throughout the country — reaching communities in both southern cities like Sài Gòn, Vĩnh Long, Long Xuyên, and Cà Mau, as well as central regions such as Nha Trang, Đà Nẵng, and Quảng Ngãi. Wherever she went, she was praised for her effectiveness and dedication to the work of God.

Her influence soon extended beyond education and evangelism. In 1963, she was officially appointed as the Women’s General Commissioner of the Protestant Church of Vietnam. In this capacity, she organized women’s committees in local churches and energized Christian women through leadership training and spiritual encouragement.

=== Expanding Influence Through Regional and International Engagement ===
As part of her leadership development efforts, Nguyễn Thị Thuấn participated in several international training programs. In 1967, she attended a seminar in Singapore focused on methods of Bible dissemination. In 1971, she traveled to Bang Lamung, Thailand for a course in Bible translation methods — skills she would later apply to training other leaders and supporting local congregations in Vietnam.

One of the crowning achievements of her leadership came in 1974, when she organized the first National Evangelical Women’s Conference (Đại Hội Phụ Nữ Tin Lành Toàn Quốc) at the Nha Trang Evangelical Orphanage (Cô nhi viện Tin Lành Nha Trang). Reflecting on that moment, she shared how she wept with joy while typing the invitation letter, overwhelmed by gratitude that God had answered her prayers.

Later in 1974, she joined the Vietnamese delegation at the First International Congress on World Evangelization (ICOWE) in Switzerland, under the sponsorship of the Billy Graham Evangelistic Association, representing the country as the national head of the Evangelical Women’s Committee.

== Escape from the Vietnam War ==
In the early 1970s, amidst the escalating turmoil of the Vietnam War, Nguyễn Thị Thuấn’s life became increasingly threatened by the growing political and social unrest. Her sons, who had enlisted in the South Vietnamese military, were directly involved in the conflict, further complicating the family's situation. Due to their association with the Protestant Church, the Pham family became targets of suspicion and persecution. As the war reached its climax, their safety was in jeopardy, and the family faced the difficult decision to leave before it was too late.

It was Nguyễn Thị Thuấn’s son, Phạm Quang Khiêm, who first recognized the danger and saw the impending collapse of South Vietnam. He convinced his mother and the rest of the family to flee the country, urging them to leave immediately and seek safety abroad.

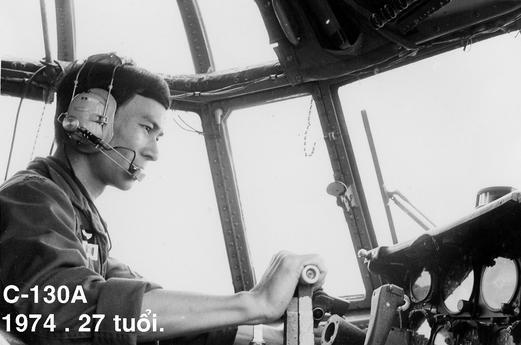
27-year-old Khiêm in at C-130A in 1974

=== Flight ===
In 1975, as North Vietnamese forces advanced, the Pham family faced an urgent need to escape. With the situation growing more dire, Nguyễn Thị Thuấn’s son, Phạm Quang Khiêm, who was serving in the South Vietnamese Air Force, managed to steal a C-130a plane to help the family flee. They flew to Singapore, hoping to find refuge. Upon arrival, however, the family was detained for three weeks, facing immense uncertainty and fear for their futures. During this time, they were in a limbo of waiting for a chance to continue their journey.

Each night, the family prayed and sang hymns, while the chief jailer, also Christian, bonded with them. After 19 days of captivity, Richard Pendell, an American pastor and close family friend, intervened by sending $30,000 to a lawyer in Singapore to ensure their release and well-being. The following day, they were taken to an island resort, where the Singaporean Interior Minister, Chua Sian Chin, apologized and offered gifts, before being flown to Saipan in first class and then on to Camp Pendleton in the U.S. for a new life.

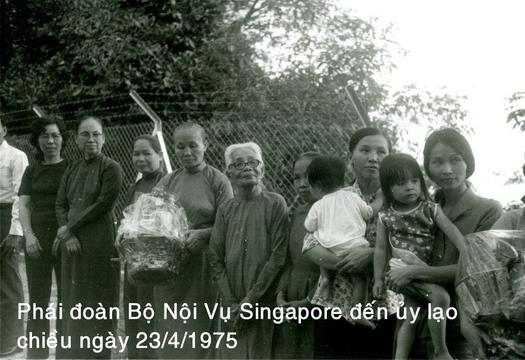
50+ escaped group held in Singapore

During this journey, another one of Nguyễn Thị Thuấn’s sons, stationed at Vung Tau with the ARVN, was left behind. He was unable to join the family due to his military obligations, marking a painful separation in their escape. After the fall of South Vietnam, he was sent to a re-education camp, where he remained for two years. On August 1, 1992, through the Orderly Departure Program (ODP), he was finally reunited with his mother and the rest of the family.

By early 1976, the Pham family had resettled in the United States, where they faced the challenges of starting anew. Nguyễn Thị Thuấn continued her life of service, adjusting to a new environment while helping the Vietnamese refugee community in the U.S. to integrate into American society. She was dedicated to preserving their cultural and spiritual heritage, and her resilience, faith, and commitment left a lasting legacy within the community.

== Legacy ==
=== Global Ministry After 1975 ===
After the Fall of Saigon in 1975, Nguyễn Thị Thuấn and her husband ministered to the Vietnamese diaspora across the globe. Their journey included stops in San Clemente, Chicago, Long Beach, Anaheim, France, the Netherlands, Germany, Egypt, Canada, Australia, and even the Soviet Union. Throughout this period, many credited Nguyễn Thị Thuấn’s encouragement and quiet strength as essential to her husband's tireless global ministry.

=== Lasting Impact ===
Her tireless efforts helped establish a nationwide women’s network and solidified her as a central figure in the spiritual formation of Vietnamese Christian women. Although she did not advocate for women to become pastors, her example opened doors for future women leaders within the church. By the 1990s, women such as Dang Van Sung and Phung Quang Huyen had become leaders of two of the largest churches in Vietnam, continuing the legacy of leadership that Nguyễn Thị Thuấn had helped establish.

Even after her husband's passing in 1995, well into her seventies, Nguyễn Thị Thuấn remained actively engaged in ministry. Despite health challenges such as high blood pressure, her commitment to God’s work never wavered. Her life became a testament to enduring faith, pioneering leadership, and the transformative power of women's ministry in the Vietnamese Protestant Church.
