= A.D. 2000 =

A.D. 2000 may refer to:

- A.D. 2000, the year 2000 of the Common Era
- AD 2000, a Catholic traditionalist magazine
