= Second International Congress on World Evangelization =

1989 Christian conference in Philippines

The Second International Congress on World Evangelization, often called Lausanne II or Lausanne '89, was a Christian conference held in Manila, Philippines in 1989.

The conference is noted for producing the Manila Manifesto, a renewed and expanded commitment to the Lausanne Covenant, an influential document in modern Evangelical Christianity.

== Overview ==
The First International Congress on World Evangelization was held in 1974. It was inspired by the work of preacher Billy Graham. It was most notable for producing the Lausanne Covenant.

The second congress was held on 11 to 20 July 1989. It was an influential world conference of over 4,000 evangelical leaders that was held in Manila, the Philippines, in 1989 to discuss the progress, resources, and methods of evangelizing the world. The theme of the congress was "Proclaim Christ until He comes".

It was here that the Christian mission strategist Luis Bush first highlighted the need for a major focus of evangelism in the "Resistant Belt", covering the middle of the eastern hemisphere. Further research in mid-1990s led to the 10/40 Window concept, which contrasts the major needs and few resources devoted to this part of the world. Over 300 mission works came out of this congress.

The congress was attended by 3,586 people and included delegates from the Soviet Union and Eastern Europe as well as women and laity. The chairman of the congress was Leighton Ford (brother-in-law to Billy Graham).

Some delegates were prevented from attending the congress for political reasons. This ban was extended to the third congress, held 20 years later.

== Further developments ==
The third Lausanne Committee for World Evangelization was held in Cape Town, South Africa in October 2010.

A fourth congress is due to be held in Seoul, South Korea, in September 2024.
