= Phạm Quang Khiêm =

South Vietnamese pilot

Khiem Pham
- Phạm Quang Khiêm
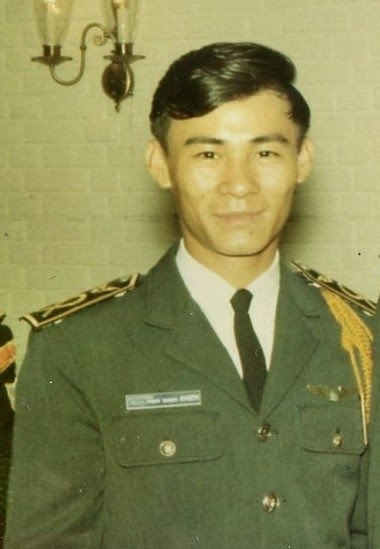
- Khiêm in September 1970
- Born: December 27, 1946 (age 79); Vĩnh Long, French Cochinchina, French Indochina
- Spouse: Ngoc-My Tran (m. 1972)
- Children: 3
- Relatives: Nguyễn Thị Thuấn (mother)
- Military career
- Allegiance: South Vietnam
- Branch: Republic of Vietnam Air Force
- Service years: 1969–1975
- Rank: First Lieutenant
- Nickname: Space Cowboy
- Unit: 435th Transport Squadron
- Known for: Stealing a C-130A to escape the North Vietnamese
- Conflicts: Vietnam War
- Other work: Airline pilot

Phạm Quang Khiêm (born December 27, 1946) is a former First Lieutenant and co-pilot of the South Vietnam Air Force (VNAF) during the Vietnam War. He served with the 53rd Tactical Wing of the 5th Air Division, stationed at Tan Son Nhut Air Base. Notably, on April 3, 1975, he orchestrated the commandeering of a C-130A aircraft to evacuate 53 individuals, including his family and colleagues, from the advancing North Vietnamese forces. Following his military service, Khiêm pursued a career in commercial aviation, serving as a pilot for Piedmont Airlines until 2006.

== Early life ==
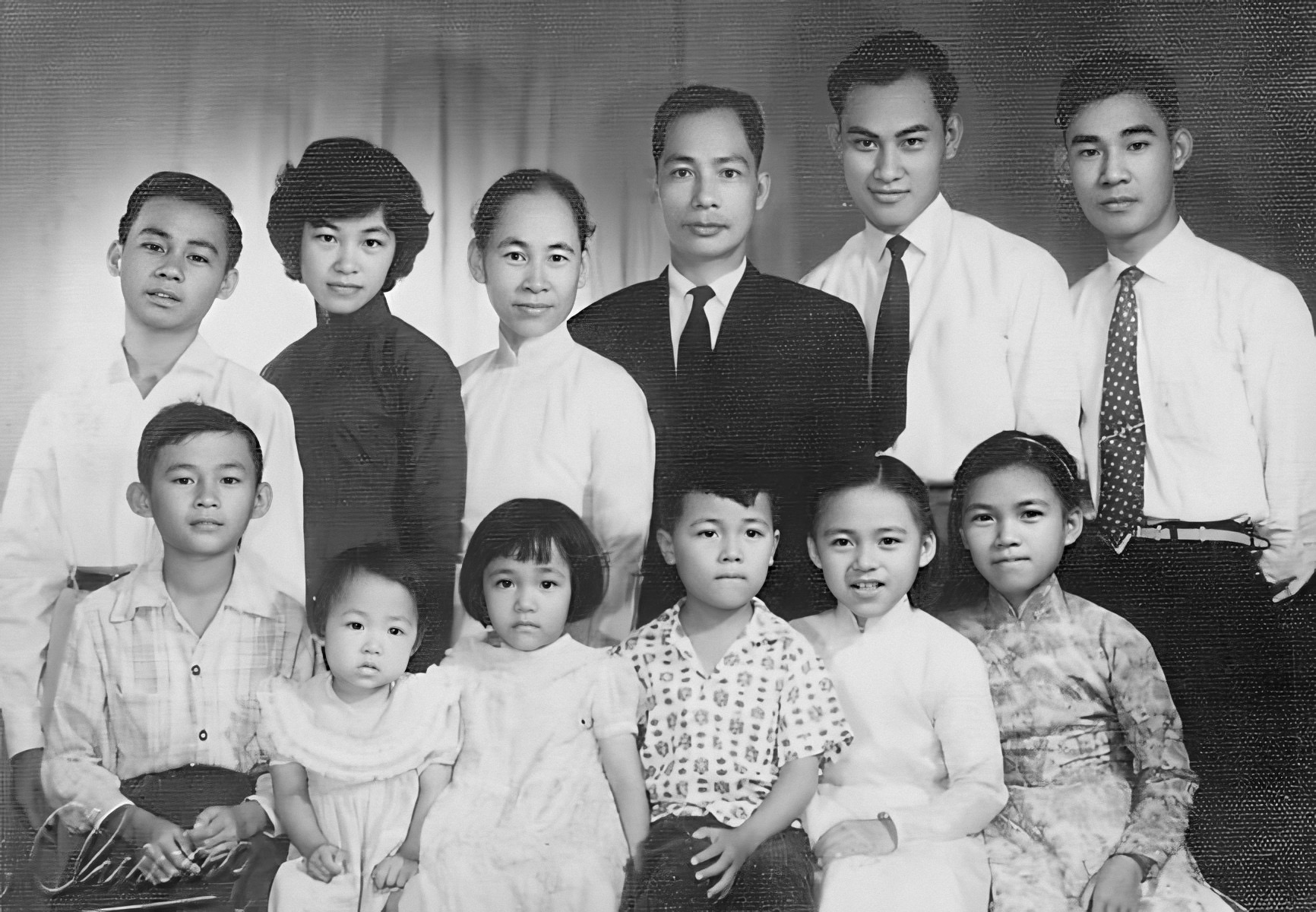
Khiêm and his family in 1960

Phạm Quang Khiêm (son of Nguyễn Thị Thuấn and Mục Sư Phạm Văn Năm) was born on December 27, 1946, in Vĩnh Long, French Cochinchina (now part of southern Vietnam). He was one of ten children in his family, with all of his brothers serving in the military. Khiêm had three children, two of whom were born in South Vietnam and one in the United States after his relocation.

== Career ==
In November 1969, Khiêm attended Lackland Air Force Base (AFB) to learn English as part of his cadet training. He continued his education at Randolph Air Force Base, where he completed basic pilot training, followed by advanced flight training at Keesler Air Force Base, where he flew the T-28 Trojan aircraft. From October to December 1970, he trained at Lockbourne Air Force Base. Khiêm was later assigned to pilot C-123K aircraft and eventually became a pilot for the 53rd Tactical Wing, 435th Transport Squadron, flying C-130A aircraft.

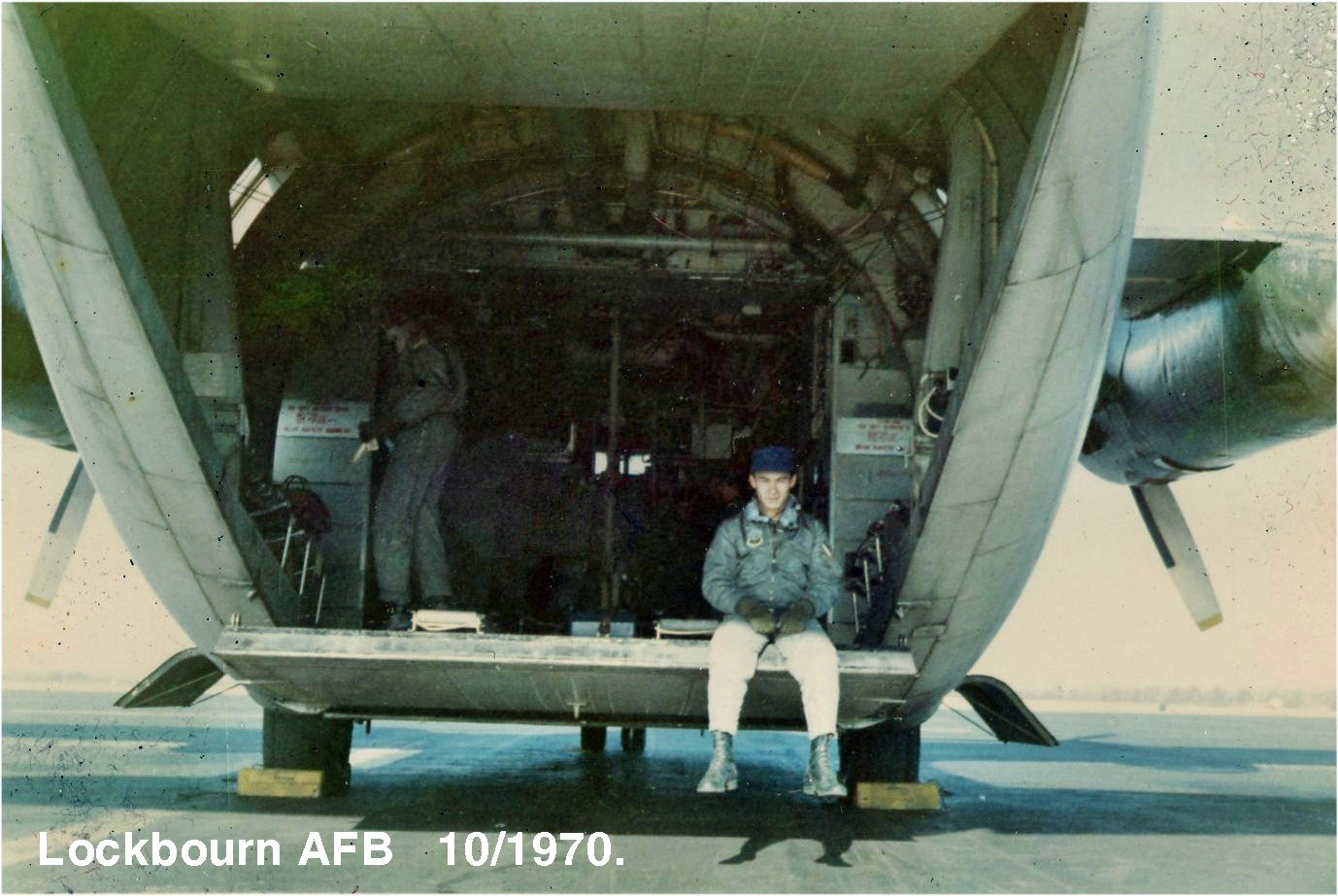
Khiêm at Lockbourne AFB

=== Hard landing in 1971 ===
On January 24, 1971, Phạm Quang Khiêm experienced a near-fatal incident that nearly ended his flight career. After a year of training in the United States, Khiêm was assigned by the Vietnam Air Force (VNAF) to Phan-Rang Air Base for "In Country Training" with the United States Air Force (USAF) on a C-123K aircraft. During this training, Khiêm flew alongside 1st Lieutenant Minh and their American instructor, Captain John Mastronardi. Minh, the Aircraft Commander, occupied the left seat, while Khiêm was in the right seat, with Captain Mastronardi overseeing the mission.

Their assignment was to transfer 48 M107 175mm shells from Bien Hoa Air Base to a U.S. Fire Support Base (FSB) located 113 kilometers north, near the Cambodian border. Due to the highly explosive nature of the cargo, they were required to land in an isolated area to ensure safety from any airport facilities. The team chose to land at Bù Gia Mập Airstrip (also known as Djamap), a short dirt runway located atop a 1,620-foot hill. The runway itself was only 3,000 feet long, significantly shorter than the 3,600-foot minimum required for co-pilots during training.

Although Minh was the designated pilot for the landing, Captain Mastronardi allowed Khiêm to remain in the right seat, believing he was capable of handling the landing after several successful attempts in similar conditions. However, Khiêm, still a relatively young pilot, did not recognize the critical difference between a short and a long runway. As they approached the runway in a hostile area, they were forced to descend rapidly, reaching 2,000 feet at 78 knots. When the aircraft was just 20 feet above the ground, crossing the end of the runway, Khiêm decided to idle the throttle, causing the aircraft to drop suddenly. The hard landing caused the left main landing gear to collapse, damaging the wheel and scraping the runway's red dirt all the way into the cockpit. Both Khiêm and Minh were temporarily blinded by the impact.

Captain Mastronardi quickly reacted by reversing the right engine, bringing the aircraft to a halt. His prompt actions prevented the plane from running off the end of the runway and tumbling down the steep hill, which could have led to a catastrophic explosion.

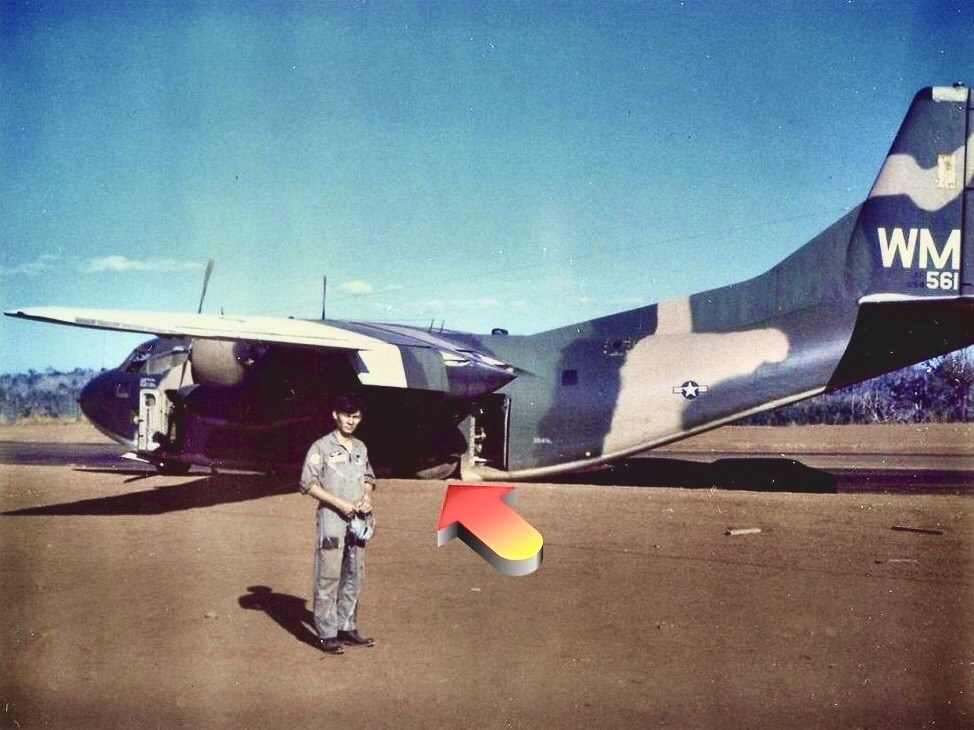
Phạm Quang Khiêm in front of the C-123K after the crash landing

== End of the War ==
By the end of March 1975, the North Vietnamese Army (NVA) had captured half of South Vietnam, and the situation across the country became increasingly chaotic. As the NVA advanced, both civilians and military personnel scrambled to escape the impending threat. Many sought refuge by hitching rides on military aircraft, hoping to flee to safer areas. The NVA's push towards the coast targeted key cities, including Qui Nhơn, Tuy Hòa, and Nha Trang, further intensifying the crisis in South Vietnam as the war neared its conclusion.

=== Pleiku ===
In the final week of March 1975, as North Vietnamese forces continued their advance, the city of Pleiku became a key evacuation point. Khiêm flew three missions to and from Pleiku, evacuating the families of personnel from the Vietnam Air Force (VNAF). As word of the evacuation spread, local civilians stormed Pleiku Air Base, forcing five C-130 aircraft en route from Saigon to turn back before completing their airlifts. In response, several C-130s were repurposed for bombing missions to destroy abandoned VNAF aircraft. The planes dropped 55-gallon drums of napalm onto the aircraft left on the ramps.

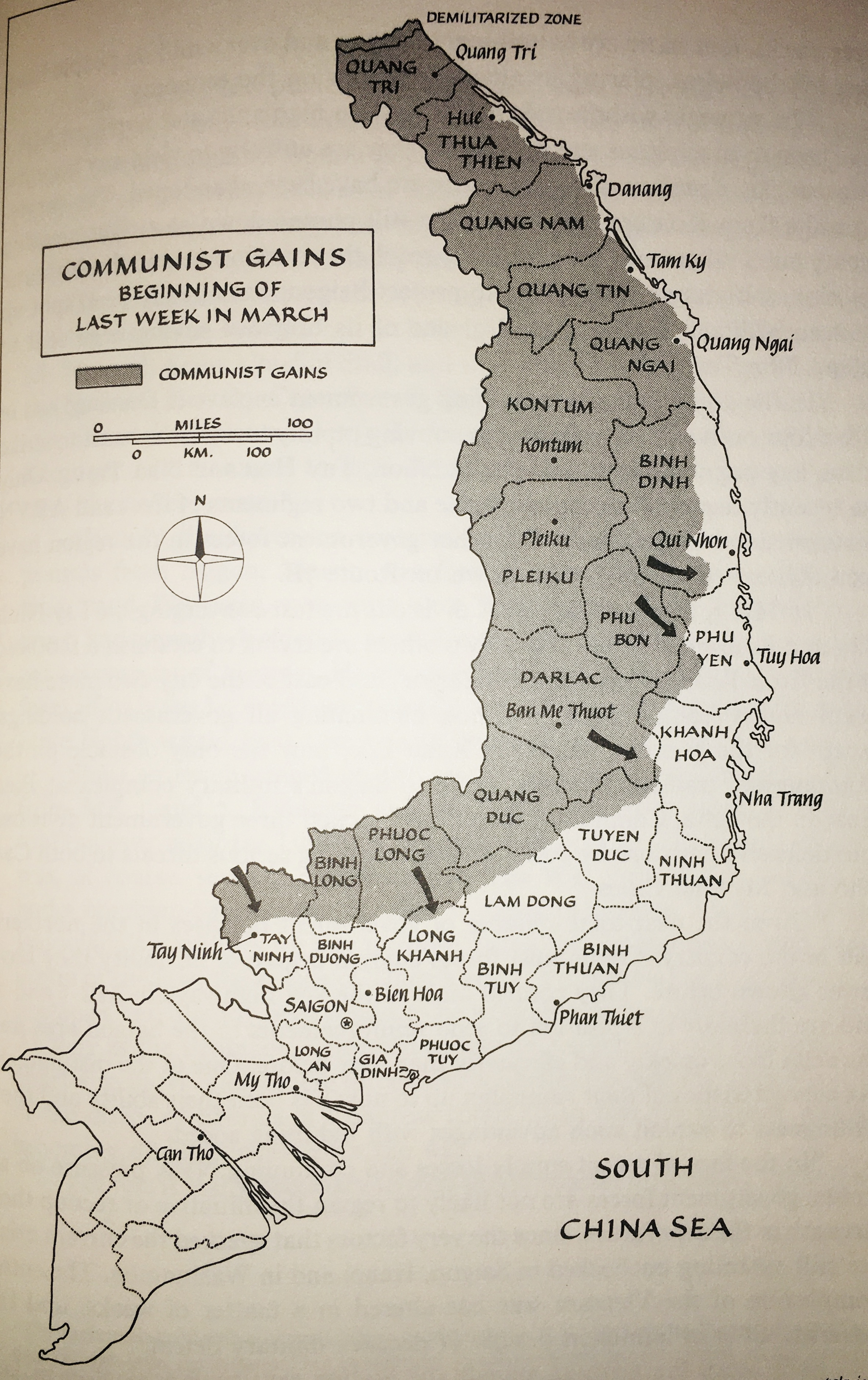
North Vietnamese gains in the last week of March 1975

=== Da Nang ===
In the north of South Vietnam, the only remaining government enclave was Da Nang. On the night of March 28, 1975, Khiêm, flew one of the last missions into Da Nang just hours before the city fell to the North Vietnamese Army (NVA). After landing, Khiêm taxied to the ramp where an ARVN major attempted to board the aircraft, seeking a seat. Knowing that the arrival of high-ranking personnel would lead to a rush of people trying to board, Khiêm ordered the major to leave the aircraft. Meanwhile, the aircraft commander was searching the terminal for his family. As the ramp quickly filled with refugees, Khiêm instructed the loadmaster to offload the cargo before allowing passengers to board. However, due to the chaotic crowd, the loading and unloading took place through the back ramp of the C-130. Once the cargo was offloaded, refugees surged onto the aircraft.

As the engines started, the noise scattered many people, allowing the aircraft to taxi away. The loadmaster informed Khiêm via intercom that the ramp could not be closed due to the presence of refugees. Khiêm applied the brakes, forcing the people into the cargo hold and allowing the ramp to close. At the end of the runway, a Military Police officer, blocking the taxiway with a truck, demanded that his family be allowed to board. Khiêm signaled for the MP to move the truck so he could proceed with takeoff. After backing up and lining up, Khiêm took off without the MP or his family on board. Upon arrival at Tan Son Nhut, Khiêm conducted a headcount of the passengers, finding 350 people on board, despite the C-130's maximum capacity of 128 passengers.

=== Nha Trang ===
On March 31, 1975, Khiêm flew several missions during the evacuation of Nha Trang. The following day, the North Vietnamese Army (NVA) captured Qui Nhơn, South Vietnam's third-largest city, and Nha Trang became the next target. As part of the ongoing evacuations, Khiêm played a key role in the Nha Trang evacuation, similar to his actions in Da Nang, ensuring that as many people as possible could escape the advancing NVA forces.

== Escape ==
On April 2, 1975, Khiêm boarded a C-130 fuel delivery mission, also known as a "bladder bird," to Phan Rang, hoping to locate his younger brother, who was stationed there as an airman. His plan was to bring his brother to Saigon, where the rest of their family had gathered. However, Khiêm was unable to find his brother and had to depart without him. On his return flight to Saigon, Khiêm realized that if Phan Rang fell to the North Vietnamese, Saigon would likely be the next target. This realization led him to begin formulating a plan to escape South Vietnam with his family.

Uncertain of where to go or how to secure a way out, Khiêm's immediate concern was finding an aircraft. Discussions among fellow VNAF pilots revealed that many were contemplating stealing planes to flee the country with their families. In response, the VNAF command ordered that aircraft be fueled only enough to complete their current missions, severely limiting their range and making it impossible for Khiêm to use an aircraft to escape the warzone. Faced with these challenges, Khiêm began considering other options, including seeking help from others to facilitate his family's escape.

=== Preparation ===
Khiêm's close friend, Major Nguyễn Canh Hữu, served in the South Vietnam Air Force in the 437th Squadron, Khiêm's sister squadron. The two men discussed the possibility of escaping South Vietnam, and Khiêm emphasized the urgency of being the first to leave, as there might not be another opportunity. Major Canh's family was in Da Lat, and he hoped to reach them and bring them to Saigon before making his escape. However, on April 2, 1975, Da Lat was overrun by communist forces, and Canh lost contact with his family. This event motivated Canh to prepare for his own escape.

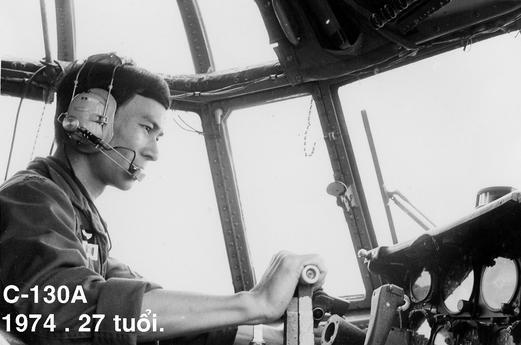
27-year-old Khiêm in at C-130A in 1974

On April 3, Khiêm was on standby for a C-130 mission, but he realized he needed to inform his family of his escape plan. He told an officer that he wasn't feeling well, which allowed him to be moved to the bottom of the mission list. Khiêm rushed home and instructed one of his brothers to keep the family close to Saigon, where they had gathered. He also told them to head to Long Thanh Airfield (also known as Bearcat Base) as soon as they received word from him. Long Thanh, once a U.S. Army airbase, had been closed and abandoned after the American withdrawal in 1973. Khiêm had landed there many times during his training.

Though Khiêm's house was only a mile from the airfield, a significant challenge remained. Because Khiêm and Major Canh were assigned to different squadrons, they were not typically allowed to fly together. Khiêm faced additional difficulty gaining access to the squadron area, as the guards did not recognize him. However, when the C-130 that Khiêm was supposed to use for his escape experienced mechanical issues, the 437th Squadron borrowed a C-130 from the 435th Squadron, nicknamed Saigon Lady, which allowed Khiêm to enter the area.

Khiêm now had to deal with another obstacle: getting rid of Canh's co-pilot. The co-pilot was eager to leave, as he had a date planned for later that day, and he gladly let Khiêm take control of the flight. The remaining problem was fuel—Khiêm initially thought the aircraft would have just enough fuel to reach Thailand. However, after checking, he discovered the tank was completely full, as the fueler had mistakenly filled it during a break. This unexpected surplus of fuel made a flight to Singapore possible.

With the crew unaware of their destination, Khiêm took off without clearance and turned southeast instead of east, telling the crew via the intercom that they were being redirected to Long Thanh instead of Phan Rang. Upon landing safely, the loadmaster opened the ramp to unload 20,000 pounds of dry rice. Khiêm's brother, who had managed to make it to Saigon just before the escape, helped the family board the plane. Khiêm then informed the crew that he and Major Canh were escaping Vietnam, and they were welcome to join them if they wished.

One of the loadmasters, who had served in the VNAF for ten years, feared that Khiêm and Canh were defecting to the North Vietnamese and immediately fled. The other loadmaster, who was on his first C-130 training mission, was unaware of the situation and stood by the open ramp. Meanwhile, the flight engineer, after hesitating, pulled out a map with flight directions to Singapore. Having heard of Singapore's newly established air force, which was in need of pilots, the Flight Engineer had planned his own escape and intended to use the map to reach Singapore.

=== Flight ===
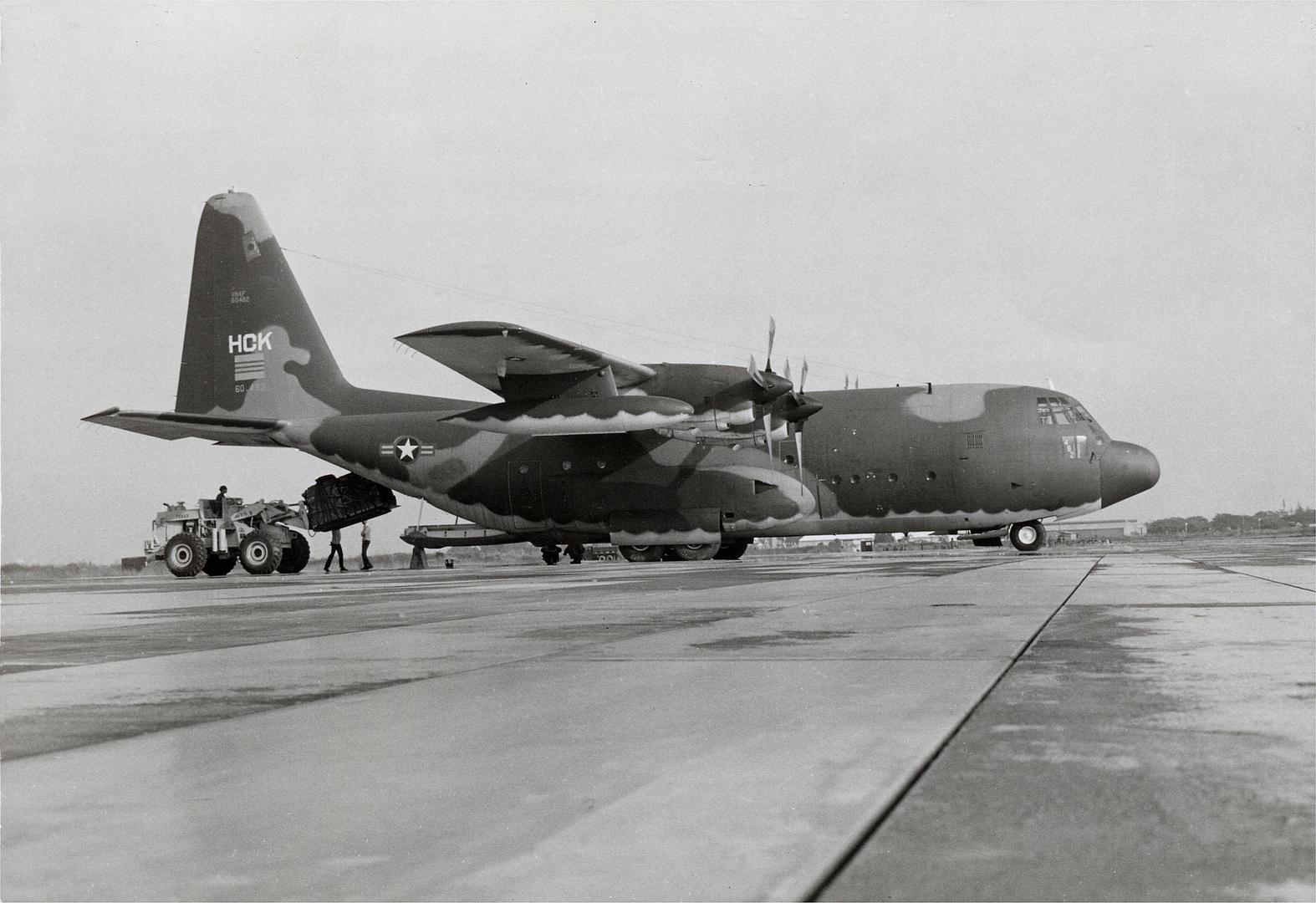
One of the C-130A's Khiêm flew in the VNAF

As Khiêm began taxiing away from the runway, chaos erupted. While passengers boarded the aircraft with their belongings, Khiêm's two-year-old daughter was trampled in the commotion and knocked unconscious, with blood covering her face. Witnessing this, Khiêm's wife, fearing for her daughter's life, fainted and accidentally dropped their infant child onto the tarmac. The baby was left behind as the plane began taxiing, but, fortunately, the wife of Khiêm's oldest brother ran out, grabbed the infant, and managed to return with the child to the moving C-130. Thankfully, all members of the family recovered after the ordeal.

As the plane moved toward the runway, Khiêm noticed the Loadmaster conversing with a group of ARVN soldiers arriving in a jeep. Just as Khiêm and Major Canh began to take off, the jeep approached and an ARVN soldier pointed an M-79 grenade launcher at the cockpit. Despite the visible threat, Khiêm proceeded with the takeoff. During this time, the aircraft's ramp remained open, which prompted Khiêm to quickly run to the back of the plane, instructing the inexperienced Loadmaster to hold the ramp switch until it was closed. He then rushed back to the cockpit, just in time to raise the landing gear.

The entire process, from landing to takeoff, took only seven minutes. Once airborne, Khiêm and Canh flew at treetop level until they reached the coast, then descended to sea level. The dense humidity at sea level created thick fog, which obscured the passengers from one another. After an hour of flying in the fog, they ascended to 16,000 feet and continued their journey toward Singapore.

==== Singapore ====
Khiêm and his group arrived in Singapore at approximately 7:00 PM, approaching Paya Lebar Airport (formerly Singapore International Airport) amid tight security. Upon arrival, Khiêm contacted Approach Control for landing instructions but was unable to understand the response. He then switched to Tower Frequency and requested landing directions. However, the communication was intercepted by the Singapore Air Force. Khiêm explained that the C-130A was off course and running low on fuel, prompting them to allow the aircraft to land on Runway 02. The group remained on the plane until authorities arrived, seeking political asylum.

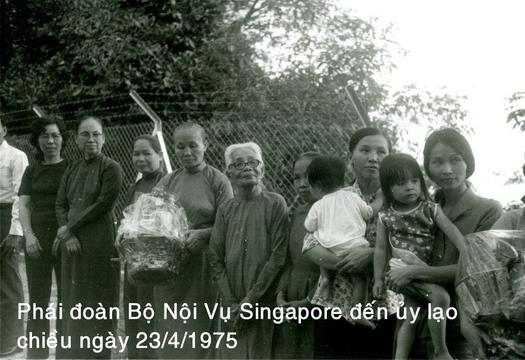
50+ escaped group held in Singapore

At the time, Singapore's Prime Minister, Lee Kuan Yew, was abroad, and the Singapore Air Defense Command (SADC) had recently been reorganized into the Republic of Singapore Air Force (RSAF) on April 1, 1975, just two days before Khiêm's arrival. The absence of the prime minister and the air force's restructuring left local officials uncertain about how to proceed.

Khiêm negotiated with the authorities, proposing that the group be allowed to leave for Australia. The officials agreed, but with the stipulation that the group would cover the fuel costs. They also required payment in U.S. dollars, which the passengers had in limited supply — approximately $100 to $400 in total. Despite attempts to bribe officials with jewelry, their offer was declined. The Singapore government formally requested the Republic of Vietnam to expatriat the group, as they were subsequently transported in separate prison trucks to Khalsa Crescent Remand Centre, a detention center outside Singapore, where they remained for repatriation until the Fall of Saigon. During their time in detention, on April 23, 1975, Singapore's Interior Minister and his staff visited Phạm's family, bringing trays of gifts wrapped with candy, pastries, and champagne.

==== Saipan ====
After spending three weeks in detention, Khiêm and his group were flown to Saipan, where they were housed in a deluxe hotel. They spent a week there before finally learning that the Republic of Vietnam (South Vietnam) had fallen to the northern forces.

==== The United States of America ====
Following their time in Saipan, Khiêm and his family were relocated to Camp Pendleton in California, where they joined over 50,000 other Vietnamese refugees being processed for resettlement in the United States.

== Homecoming ==
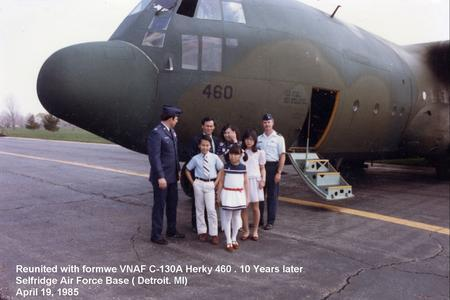
Khiêm and his family reunited with Saigon Lady after ten years

Khiêm successfully saved his entire family, with the exception of his youngest brother, who was serving in the ARVN and stationed at Vũng Tàu. After the fall of South Vietnam, his brother was sent to a re-education camp, where he remained for two years. On August 1, 1992, through the Orderly Departure Program (ODP), Khiêm was finally reunited with his brother and the rest of his family.

== Post-Vietnam career ==
Upon learning that Khiêm had arrived in the United States, Captain Mastronardi sent him $500 to help him get started. Khiêm and his family settled in Dayton, Ohio, where, in the mid-1980s, he was hired by Piedmont Airlines (which later merged with USAir and is now part of American Airlines). Remarkably, within just three years, Khiêm advanced to the right seat.

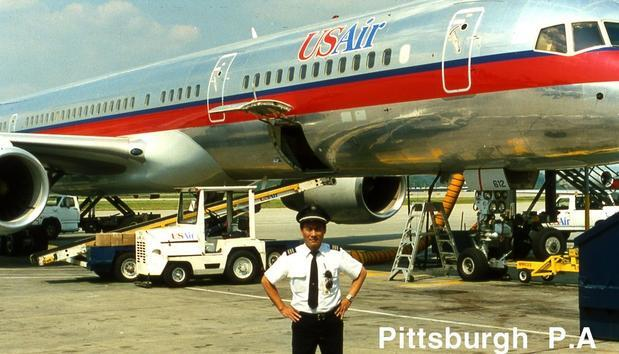
Khiem Pham retired in 2006 as a pilot from US Airways with a total of 18,000 air flight hours

On January 30, 1991, Khiêm was piloting a Boeing 737 on a flight from Raleigh, North Carolina, to Washington National Airport. During the approach, another aircraft aborted its takeoff, forcing Khiêm to land on Runway 33, a shorter runway intended for smaller aircraft, situated between the Potomac River and The Pentagon. Despite the challenges, Khiêm maintained a steady speed and made a successful landing at 500 feet, instead of the usual 1000 feet. He slightly dropped the plane's speed by 5 knots, which caused the nose and wheels to slam onto the runway, but fortunately, there were no injuries or casualties among the 87 passengers on board.
