= Luis Bush =

Argentine missionary

Luis Bush is an Argentina-born Christian missionary and the president of the Transform World Connections.

== Early life ==
Bush was born in Argentina, but was raised in Brazil. In 1970 he graduated from the University of North Carolina in Chapel Hill, North Carolina, in economics and worked in Business Consulting for an Arthur Andersen Consulting in Chicago before deciding in 1973 to devote his life to Christian ministry. He graduated from theological seminary in 1978.

== Ministry ==
In 1978, he traveled to San Salvador, along with his wife Doris, to serve at the Iglesia Nazaret as senior pastor. Bush led the movement of missions called COMIBAM from Latin America during its initial phase and later served as CEO of Partners International from 1986 to 1992, an organization that seeks to grow communities of Christian witnesses in largely non-Christian areas by partnering with indigenous Christian ministries. He served as the international director of the AD2000 & Beyond Movement from 1989 to 2001.

== The 10/40 Window & Transform World ==
He and his wife Doris coined the term 10/40 Window, which focused on the region of the world with least exposure to Christianity. Transform World was the name given to the first global event in Indonesia in 2005 when Luis was asked to serve as international facilitator for other related events processes.

Throughout the 1990s, Ted Haggard's New Life Church, at the vanguard of the spiritual mapping movement through its close ties to C. Peter Wagner and Bush, had a mission of supporting Bush and initiating the Prayer Through the Window events, which had tens of millions of participants.

== 4/14 Window ==
Luis Bush also champions the term 4/14 Window, which is a child evangelism movement term. The 4/14 Window is a global Christian mission movement focused on delivering children between the ages of 4 and 14 years old from oppression, deception, depression and destruction.

== Later studies ==
Bush completed a PhD in Intercultural Studies from Fuller Theological Seminary School of Intercultural Studies in 2003. The study of catalytic antecedents of today’s mission led to a World Inquiry conducted from 2002 to 2004 involving participants from more than 700 cities.
