= Joshua Project =

Christian missionary organization

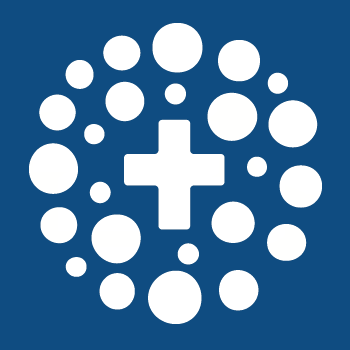
- Formation: 1995; 31 years ago
- Headquarters: Colorado Springs, U.S.
- Website: joshuaproject.net

The Joshua Project is an evangelical Christian organization based in Colorado Springs, United States, which seeks to coordinate the work of missionary organizations to track the ethnic groups of the world with the fewest followers of evangelical Christianity. To do so, it maintains ethnologic data to support Christian missions. It also tracks the evangelism efforts among 17,351 people groups worldwide—a people group being "the largest group within which the Gospel can spread as a church planting movement," according to the project's website—to identify people groups as yet unreached by Christian evangelism.

== History ==
The project began in 1995 within the former AD2000 and Beyond Movement, which itself sprang from the 1989 Global Consultation on World Evangelization (GCOWE) prior to the Second International Congress on World Evangelization. From 2001 through 2005 the Joshua Project was at different times informally connected with the Caleb Project, and the International Christian Technologists Association (ICTA) and World Help. In 2006, the Joshua Project officially became part of the U.S. Center for World Mission, later called the Venture Center.

The goal of the project is to bring definition to the unfinished task of the Great Commission by providing accurate, regularly updated ethnic people group information critical for understanding the scope of the work required.

Focusing on ethnicity, the project maintains a database of "unreached peoples" listed by country and language. As of 2010, they list 9,803 ethnic groups. These are further divided into 16,350 peoples-by-countries, counting national minorities individually for each of 236 countries, of which 6,642 are classified as "unreached peoples". Ethnic groups are organized hierarchically in 251 "People Clusters" which in turn are divided in 16 "Affinity Blocs" (Arab World, East Asians, Eurasians, Horn of Africa-Cushitic, Iranian-Median, Jews, Latin-Caribbean Americans, Malay peoples, North American peoples, Pacific Islanders, South Asians, Southeast Asians, Sub-Saharan Africans, Tibetan / Himalayan peoples, Turkic peoples and Unclassified). Each ethnicity is listed as speaking at least one of 6,510 languages.

== See also ==
- 10/40 window
- Ethnologue
- John Allen Chau
