= Doug Birdsall =

American evangelical

S. Douglas Birdsall
- Known for: Lausanne Movement, honorary chairman
- Spouse: Jeanine Rowell (m. 1975)
- Children: 3

S. Douglas Birdsall is an American pastor who is the honorary chairman of the Lausanne Movement, a global network of Christians launched in 1974. He has been the executive chairman of Lausanne, and provided overall leadership for the Third Lausanne Congress in Cape Town, South Africa. Drawing over 4,000 participants from 198 countries and from a wide variety of denominations, Cape Town 2010 was the most diverse gathering of Christians in history. He was the president of American Bible Society until October 2013. Birdsall currently serves as president of the Civilitas Group.

== Education ==
Birdsall received a B.A. from Wheaton College, a M.Div. from Gordon-Conwell Theological Seminary, a Th.M. from Harvard University, and a PhD from the Oxford Centre for Mission Studies. Birdsall received on honorary doctorate from Belhaven University in 2010.

== Career ==
Birdsall and his wife, Jeanie, began their career as missionaries in Japan with LIFE Ministries in 1980. Five years later he became LIFE's director of staff for Japan, and in 1991 Birdsall was named president of the mission. Birdsall re-organized the agency to focus on developing Christian leaders, and led its expansion throughout Asia and name change to Asian Access. Today Asian Access trains pastors and Christian leaders in more than a dozen Asian countries.

In 1999 Birdsall was appointed director of the J Christy Wilson Center for World Mission. at Gordon-Conwell Theological Seminary in Hamilton, Massachusetts. In 2004 he was named executive chairman of the Lausanne Committee for World Evangelization. In 2007 he stepped down from presidency of Asian Access to focus entirely on the Lausanne Movement. He continues to serve on the Asian Access board.

In 2013 Wheaton College named Birdsall alumnus of the year for distinguished service to society.

== Family ==
Birdsall is a fifth-generation Christian minister. He was raised in Peoria, Illinois, where his father Roger Birdsall was a United Brethren pastor. In 1975 Birdsall married Jeanine Rowell. All three of their children were born in Japan.
