= Michael Oh =

Michael Young-Suk Oh (born 19 April 1971) is a Korean American evangelical and the Global Executive Director/CEO of the Lausanne Committee for World Evangelization.

== Education ==
Oh received a B.S., M.S., and Ph.D. from the University of Pennsylvania, an M.Div. from Trinity Evangelical Divinity School, and an M.A. from Harvard University.

== Ministry ==
Oh and his wife, Pearl, were teachers in the Philadelphia area before moving to Deerfield, IL for seminary training at Trinity Evangelical Divinity School. It was there while under the training of Paul Hiebert, that they received a call to global mission with a particular vision for reaching Japan with the gospel. In 1998 and 1999 they served as missionaries with Mission to the World in Nagoya, Japan where they planted Chita Zion Church, founded the Open House English School, and began an outreach event for young people called Heart & Soul.

In January 2004 the Oh family returned as missionaries to Japan and founded CBI Japan. Michael served as president of Christ Bible Seminary from 2005-2014.

Oh has spoken at conferences, churches, and schools around the world including Urbana 2009 and Desiring God Conferences in 2009 and 2011.

Oh first became involved with the Lausanne movement by participating in the 2004 Forum for World Evangelization in Pattaya, Thailand. He delivered the keynote address at the 2006 Lausanne Younger Leaders Gathering in Port Dixon, Malaysia, and joined the Lausanne Board in 2007 with a particular focus on developing younger leaders within the movement. He has served as global executive director / CEO since March 2013.

== Personal life ==
Oh is a fifth generation Christian on his father's side. His parents, Sung Kyu Henry and Young Lee Oh, along with his older sister Tina, immigrated from South Korea to America in 1970.

He and his wife Pearl have five children, four daughters and one son.
