= Michael Cassidy (evangelist) =

South African evangelist (born 1936)

Michael Cassidy (born 24 September 1936) is a South African Christian leader, evangelist, writer and founder of Africa Enterprise, known for his initiatives at ecumenism, and reconciliation on personal, church and political levels.

== Early life ==
He was born on 24 September 1936 in Johannesburg, South Africa, the son of Charles Stewart Cassidy and Mary Reading.. Michael Cassidy converted to Christianity in 1954 at the Harringay Arena in the United Kingdom during a Billy Graham crusade. Michael Cassidy cites Billy Graham as one of two dominant influences in his life. The other influence in his life was John Stott who is noted as the leader of the worldwide evangelical movement.

== Education ==
Cassidy went to school at Michaelhouse in Natal, he attended Cambridge University where he studied Modern and Medieval Languages and was an awarded a bachelor's degree and a Master of Arts degree in 1958. He attended Fuller Theological Seminary in 1963 completing a Bachelor of Divinity and the Azusa Pacific University in California in 1993.

== Career ==
Cassidy founded and led African Enterprise in Pietermaritzburg, Kwazulu-Natal since 1961. Charles E. Fuller who was the founder of Fuller Theological Seminary helped Michael Cassidy get started on African Enterprise by identifying the first three board members for him (Bruce Bare, James Gorton and his secretary, Rose Baessler). He made his secretarial staff available to Michael plus a small loan of seed money and he provided five tickets for the first African Enterprise Team to travel to Pietermaritzburg, South Africa for the Pietermaritzburg Mission in 1961.

In 1992, Billy Graham asked Michael Cassidy to visit Nelson Mandela after Graham had received a letter from Mandela. Cassidy presented Mandela with a signed copy of Billy Graham's book Peace with God. At Nelson Mandela's request Michael Cassidy networked with other religious leaders to press for reconciliation before South Africa's election in 1994 and after.

In 1974, Michael Cassidy was part of the First International Congress on World Evangelization and was part of the initial planning meeting for the Congress. He was instrumental in bringing the Conference to Cape Town, South Africa in 2010. In 2012, he was made the Honorary Chairman of the Lausanne Movement for World Evangelisation. He was also recognised as Fuller Theological Seminary's Distinguished Alumnus of 2012.

== Honours ==
- Member of Order of Simon of Cyrene

== Works ==
- The passing summer: a South African's response to White fear, Black anger, and the politics of love. Regal Books. 1990. ISBN 9780830714247.
- Bursting the wineskins: The Holy Spirit's transforming work in a peacemaker and his world. Harold Shaw Publishers. 1983. ISBN 978-0-87788-094-3.
- Footprints in the African Sand: My Life and Times. InterVarsity Press. 2019. ISBN 978-0-281-08101-1.

A witness Forever: The Dawning of Democracy in South Africa. Publisher Oasis
