= Millie Dienert =

American Christian speaker

- Born: September 3, 1917; Blue Bell, Pennsylvania, US
- Died: August 24, 2015 (aged 97)
- Education: University of Pennsylvania; Philadelphia School of the Bible
- Known for: Christian women's speaker; Business executive
- Spouse: Alfred Dienert (m. 1938–1993)
- Children: 3

Mildred Dienert (née Elsner; September 3, 1917 – August 24, 2015) was an American popular Christian women's speaker and Bible teacher in the 1960s to 1990s, associated with the Billy Graham Evangelistic Association.

== Early years and education ==
Dienert was born in Blue Bell, Pennsylvania, the daughter of Miriam and Theodore Elsner. Her father was a traveling evangelist and as a child she felt neglected and blamed God for her parents' absence. In 1931, however, the family settled in Philadelphia when her father began a nondenominational church there, later called the Philadelphia Gospel Tabernacle. When the 17-year old Millie Elsner survived an automobile accident that killed all of the other occupants in her car, the teen experienced increased devotion and a resolve to dedicate her life to Christ. She subsequently attended the University of Pennsylvania and the Philadelphia School of the Bible.

== Association with Billy Graham ==
Mildred Elsner married Fred Dienert, who was a partner in Walter Bennett Communications. The Pennsylvania-based agency represented ministries broadcasting on radio and television, such as G. E. Lowman, Billy Graham, and others. By the mid-1960s, her husband was the television producer for the Billy Graham Crusades and she helped Graham by organizing prayer groups in advance of his crusades. So successful were her efforts for the 1966 London Crusade that Graham asked her to continue this role thereafter and Dienert's prayer groups became a regular part of the advance preparations for Graham's worldwide crusades. Eventually, Dienert became known as the "first lady of prayer". In writing his 1996 book, With God on Our Side, author William C. Martin included in his research the role of Dienert in Billy Graham's crusades. His research material is now preserved at Rice University's Woodson Research Center.

== As a speaker ==
Dienert was a popular Bible teacher and speaker at church meetings and conferences around the U.S. When Dienert addressed a Conference, said the Petoskey News-Review, she could speak without notes for an hour and "hold a thousand women in rapt silence". Dienert rejected the prosperity gospel teaching that blessings and well-being are always God's will for the believer, saying, "I have a problem with people making Christian life look so beautiful and great that you have to be one". Instead, she spoke of life's trials and sorrows that can beset the Christian, often citing her own disappointments, such as her son Ted's divorce from Billy Graham's daughter and then his death at age 52 on her 80th birthday. Recalling her sadness when her husband died after 55 years of marriage, she said, "When you walk lonely and broken-hearted, keeping your right perspective on God is a challenge".

Dienert was the first woman to preside over a White House Prayer Breakfast, during the Nixon Administration. She later chaired the prayer committee at the First International Congress on World Evangelization held in 1974 in Lausanne, Switzerland. During the U.S. Bicentennial in 1976, she served on the Advisory Group for the National Day of Prayer, along with others such as Harold Lindsell of Christianity Today.

== Writings and honors ==
Dienert was named Churchwoman of the Year in 1990 by Religious Heritage of America. In 2002, she contributed to the book, Billy Graham: A Tribute from Friends, a compendium of tributes about the famous evangelist from celebrities and personal anecdotes from his friends. Although the Publishers Weekly review was generally dismissive of the book, calling it "tedious", the review praised Dienert's humorous reminiscence and "vivid account" of Graham's influence on her life. She also wrote the introduction to the 1980 book, The prayer that teaches to pray.

== Personal life and later years ==
The couple had three children, Ted, Marilyn, and Darlene, whose name appealed to the Dienerts after hearing the daughter of a Bennett agency client, G. E. Lowman, so named. When her husband died in 1993, Dienert succeeded him as president of Walter Bennett, although she was 76 years old at the time. She died on August 24, 2015, at the age of 97.
