= Lausanne Committee for World Evangelization =

Non-profit organization in the USA

The Lausanne Committee for World Evangelization, more commonly known as the Lausanne Movement, is a global movement that mobilizes Christian leaders to collaborate for world evangelization. The movement's fourfold vision is to see "the gospel for every person, disciple-making churches for every people and place, Christ-like leaders for every church and sector, and kingdom impact in every sphere of society".

Born out of the 1974 International Congress on World Evangelization (ICOWE) in Lausanne, Switzerland, the Lausanne Movement began with the vision of Billy Graham to multiply mission efforts by bringing Christian leaders and influencers together for the task of evangelism. John Stott was one of the founding members and the first to chair the Theology Working Group, who worked to produce the Lausanne Covenant, the movement's statement of theology and practice for world evangelization. Later documents produced over the subsequent two congresses include The Manila Manifesto (Lausanne II, 1989), which exists as an "elaboration" of the Covenant, and The Cape Town Commitment (Lausanne III, 2010), which is a confession of faith and a call to the global church for action.

Since 1974, the Lausanne Movement has become a platform for the convening of evangelical leaders, and has hosted a number of global congresses, gatherings, and catalytic networks that have impacted the scope of world missions and facilitated the expansion of Christianity in modern times. This has been achieved by connecting leaders across regions, issues, and generations to collaboratively and prayerfully work towards the advancement of the gospel.

== History ==
The history of the Lausanne Movement includes two indirect events leading up to the 1974 International Congress on World Evangelization, otherwise known as Lausanne I.

A first precursor was the Congress on the Church's Worldwide Mission, held at Wheaton College in 1966. The 1966 Wheaton Congress was organized by the Interdenominational Foreign Mission Association and the Evangelical Foreign Missions Association. During the conference's final address, a number of important issues facing the evangelical church were outlined. These included the need for evangelical unity regarding the inerrancy of Scripture, reigniting the urgency of Christ's return, as well as the critical need to challenge syncretism, universalism, and controversial evangelistic strategies. In addition, the address affirmed the need for the multiplication of local churches, and the presiding importance of 'foreign missions', as well as the need for unity (but not union) in evangelical witness, the church's priority to address social issues, and the urgency of a universal commitment to world evangelism.

=== Berlin Congress on World Evangelism ===
The second event leading up to the inception of the Lausanne Movement was the 1966 Congress on World Evangelism in Berlin, organized by the Billy Graham Evangelistic Association and Christianity Today. During his address at the Berlin Congress, Billy Graham laid out a framework for understanding different biblical methods of evangelism that could form a strategy for global evangelization. Subsequent talks at the congress, led by church leaders from around the world, explained the shift in the center of Christianity from the West to the South and East, and touched on global and local needs, issues, and opportunities. The conference inspired further regional conferences in Southeast Asia, Latin America, the United States, and Australia.

Against a background of deep concerns among evangelicals regarding the doctrinal and missiological developments in the World Council of Churches, Billy Graham reiterated many of the major concerns of the 1966 Wheaton Congress. While Graham rejected what he called modern theology and humanistic interpretations of the gospel, he emphasized that confusion about evangelism was the primary hindrance to world evangelization. Without negating the importance of ecumenism and social action, he asserted the church's clearest mandate was to save souls.

The 1966 Berlin Congress highlighted the changes in global Christianity and alerted Billy Graham, and all those in attendance, to challenges and perspectives outside of the Western world that were completely different to the Western evangelical concerns of theological liberalism, humanism, politics, and race relations. The global church needed a larger, more diversely constructed strategy for world evangelization, and they needed a platform which could represent the challenges and needs of the church around the world.

Furthermore, mission in the World Council of Churches (WCC) during the 1960s and early 1970s had become marginalized by being largely reinterpreted in socio-political terms. This had consequences and implications in many different areas of missiology, not all of them immediately obvious. It was against this backdrop, as well as the Second Vatican Council, the spread of liberation theology, and the growth of the charismatic movement, that Billy Graham and John Stott saw the need to institute a movement such as Lausanne.

== Lausanne I ==
In July 1974, over 2,500 participants, including evangelists, missionaries, mission leaders, theologians, pastors, and national church leaders from 150 nations gathered in Lausanne, Switzerland, for the First International Congress on World Evangelization. TIME magazine described it as ‘a formidable forum, possibly the widest-ranging meeting of Christians ever held’. The congress drew a substantial number of leaders from the evangelical communities of Africa, Latin America, and Asia which were emerging at the time. Leighton Ford, program chair of the First Congress, wrote, ‘It was not an easy task to discern which topics in the tumultuous world we needed to deal with, and what speakers and leaders could best help us discern directions for the future. We wanted to achieve genuine diversity of viewpoints, while remaining firmly committed to biblical authority. We did not want the predictability of only offering a platform to well-known personalities. Our desire was to have a true interchange of thoughts, concerns, and ideas, and to build relationships. That was indeed a challenge with such an international group.' This has remained the framework for all of the subsequent congresses the Lausanne Movement has held.

=== Outcomes of Lausanne I ===
The Lausanne Covenant arose as a result of the congress. It defined the necessity and goals of evangelization, unified evangelicals from diverse backgrounds and shaped much of their endeavors for the rest of the century. The Covenant was drafted by an international committee chaired by John Stott and publicly signed by leaders and participants at Lausanne I.

Secondly, Lausanne I highlighted the subject of unreached people groups (UPGs). Acclaimed as ‘one of the milestone events in missiology’, Ralph Winter's plenary address in 1974 introduced the now widespread term. At a crucial point in church history, Winter contended that cross-cultural mission needed to be the primary task of the church, as thousands of ethnic groups remained without a single Christian witness and with no access to Scripture in their native language.

Thirdly, the global congress brought to the church's attention the topic of holistic mission. The congress urged the necessity of both evangelism and social responsibility in mission at a time when the church was facing polarization towards one or the other. The voices of Latin American theologians Samuel Escobar and Rene Padilla were among the clearest to be heard on addressing the issue. This created a significant paradigm shift in evangelical thinking at the time, and today the widespread acceptance of holistic or integral mission, which incorporates evangelism as well as social responsibility, can largely be attributed to the 1974 Congress.

=== From single congress to movement ===
The 1974 Lausanne Congress ended with a call by delegates for a continuation committee. Under the leadership of Leighton Ford, the continuation committee's first meeting was organized in 1975 in Mexico City.

The committee articulated the aim of the movement as furthering ‘the total biblical mission of the church, recognizing that in this mission of sacrificial service, evangelism is primary, and that our particular concern must be the [then 2,700 million] unreached people of the world.’

Four initial working groups were established, each one focused on one of the following topics: intercession, theology, strategy, and communication. Later, four more working groups were added, focusing on leadership development, resource mobilization and technology, and combined business, government, education, media, and medicine. The formation of these issue groups, along with the appointment of regional leaders and committees, sought to put into action the deliberations of the congress in Lausanne.

Furthermore, by the 1980s a large number of major evangelical mission agencies in North America and in many other countries had reframed their statements of faith in light of the Lausanne Covenant. This meant that the emphasis on world evangelization through the Covenant’s 15 sections spread quickly and the essence of Lausanne gained momentum, sparking what became known as the Lausanne Movement.

== Lausanne II, Manila 1989 ==
Following the First Lausanne Congress (Lausanne I), the international working groups, issue groups, and regional committees continued to collaborate and host regional congresses and smaller gatherings. Then in 1989, the Lausanne Movement hosted its most ambitious event since Lausanne I in Manila, Philippines. More than 4,000 participants from 173 nations, far more than the number of United Nations members at the time, gathered in Manila. Many commented that such expansive global representation provided a foretaste of heaven.

Compared with the First Lausanne Congress, Lausanne II enjoyed notable involvement from the Soviet Union, Eastern Europe, women, and laity. Since Lausanne I, Billy Graham’s involvement in the Lausanne Movement had been limited due to his focus on his particular form of evangelism. Where Lausanne I had been organized and funded almost entirely by the Billy Graham Evangelistic Association, Lausanne II was much more independent, and was organized by the Lausanne Committee and funded by those who embraced the “spirit of Lausanne.”

=== The Manila Manifesto ===
As a result of the Second Lausanne Congress (Lausanne II), The Manila Manifesto was issued, a follow-up to the Lausanne Covenant, wherein a number of ways the movement was evolving were outlined. Albeit carefully constructed, with the purpose of bringing together the various strands of the congress and pointing towards the future, The Manila Manifesto was not as well-received as the Lausanne Covenant. It is possible this was due in part to the lack of infrastructure available to Lausanne to follow up on many of the achievements of the congress.

Outcomes from Lausanne II which issued a global impact include the concept of the 10/40 window, which shaped missionary strategy for decades to follow, and over 300 new working partnerships focusing on a wide range of critical missional issues, particularly located in the Majority World.

== Lausanne III, Cape Town 2010 ==
The Third Lausanne Congress on World Evangelization took place in Cape Town, South Africa, 16–25 October 2010, at the Cape Town International Convention Centre. It was attended by 4,000 participants and 1000 guests from 197 countries. Thousands more participated in seminaries, universities, churches, and through mission agencies and radio networks globally through an online platform called Cape Town GlobaLink.

The Cape Town congress (Lausanne III) was substantially different from its predecessors because of the voice given to large numbers of leaders and participants from the Majority World. Christianity Today described the third congress as ‘a younger, more ethnically diverse, and more geographically varied consortium of evangelical leaders than ever before’.

Cape Town 2010 was carefully assembled to depict an accurate demographic of the global church, especially giving a voice to the church in the Majority World, where the center of Christianity had rapidly been shifting. Program Committee Chair, Ramez Atallah, encouraged an informal seating layout suitable for discussion by seating six delegates per table and having shorter speeches with more opportunity for sharing thoughts and ideas than previous congresses. The goal of Cape Town 2010 was to re-stimulate the spirit of Lausanne represented in the Lausanne Covenant: to promote unity, humbleness in service, and a call to action for global evangelization.

=== The Cape Town Commitment ===
The outcomes of Lausanne III were captured and published in The Cape Town Commitment. Issues that were addressed include evangelism in oral cultures, mission populations in diaspora, and the emergent megacities of the world. The title of The Cape Town Commitment was carefully chosen to communicate that it is not a declaration or a manifesto, but a commitment for the Lausanne Movement to fulfill, and has since become the road map for Lausanne.

Crafted over the course of three years by engaged evangelical theologians from all continents, The Cape Town Commitment is the third major evangelical statement on missionary belief and practice produced by the Lausanne Movement.

== Lausanne IV, Seoul 2024 ==
The Fourth Lausanne Congress for World Evangelization is set to take place in Seoul, South Korea, in September 2024. The emphasis for this gathering will be listening to each other to discover gaps and opportunities, breakthroughs, opportunities for collaboration, areas for additional research, and expanded connections for the church globally. A listening process to discern the current dominant themes and issues facing the church will take place in anticipation of the fourth congress, as well as regional and generational gatherings.

Lausanne IV hopes to multiply collaborative action on the ground through action teams which will be convened and implemented as a result of the fourth global congress in Seoul.

A Lausanne leadership member clarified that a translation error led to the omission of key sentences from a statement on same-sex relations, resulting in misunderstanding. He emphasized that Lausanne opposes homosexuality but aimed to offer a European perspective to those struggling with same-sex attraction, which did not resonate with Asian sentiments.

== Younger Leaders Gathering ==
After the tragic death of his son, Leighton Ford, who was chair of the continuation committee after the First Lausanne Congress, began to focus more of his attention on equipping the next generation. As a result of his vision for younger leaders, 300 key younger leaders (aged under 45) from around the world gathered together in Singapore for the first Younger Leaders Gathering in 1987. The second Younger Leaders Gathering was held in Malaysia in 2006, and the third one was held in Jakarta, Indonesia, in 2016 (YLG2016).

The purpose of the Younger Leaders Gatherings is to build up the next generation of global evangelical leaders, by bringing together leaders between the ages of 25 and 35, and connecting them with each other and with other senior global leaders.

== Organization ==
The Lausanne Movement is not an organization, but an organic movement without formal membership structure. There have been many pressures over the decades to institutionalize the Movement, but Lausanne leaders continue to insist that they remain minimally institutionalized. The two times where this concept was strained was in preparation for both the 1989 and 2010 congresses. These international congresses had to be run in an organized way and needed large infrastructures in order to operate. However, in both cases, the infrastructures built for the congresses were able to be quickly dismantled while the Movement continued. This has always been the focus of Lausanne.

In its early days an international headquarters was established in London where Gottfried Osei-Mensah had relocated from Nairobi to take up the role of executive secretary. Following his resignation in 1984, the Lausanne Movement again functioned from the location of its primary officers without a centralized headquarters.

=== Leadership ===
The Lausanne Movement was founded by Billy Graham. Lifetime Honorary Chairs include John Stott, Leighton Ford, Michael Cassidy, and Douglas Birdsall. From 2011, the roles of Board Chair and global executive director/CEO were separated. The Lausanne board of directors is chaired by Bob Doll. The global executive director/CEO is Michael Oh, who succeeded Doug Birdsall in 2013. Board members and leadership members include Christian leaders and influencers from around the world.

== Ongoing impact ==
=== Issue Networks ===
Issue Networks are focused target groups, each with a single identifiable missional challenge or opportunity. These are led by Lausanne Catalysts, who each have a special interest and experience in that field. These smaller groups of influencers focus on a critical mission topic including the Gospel and Culture, Children at Risk, and Business as Mission. In 2022 there were a total of 27 Issue Networks. Lausanne Issue Networks exist to catalyze and connect Christians on the ground with evangelical influencers, for the goal of global mission in every sphere of society, through gatherings focused on biblical prayer, reflection, training, and ministry action.

=== Regions ===
The Lausanne Movement spans the globe and has regional directors representing twelve continental or sub-continental regions. These are Latin America; Francophone Africa; the Middle East and North Africa (MENA); South East Asia; Europe; English, Portuguese, and Spanish-speaking Africa (EPSA); Eurasia; the Caribbean; South Asia; East Asia; Oceania; and North America (operating as the Billy Graham Center of Wheaton College). Each of the twelve regional directors work closely with a support group to connect influencers and ideas in each region of the world through networking, regional consultations, and contextualized communications to and from their region.

=== Generations ===
YLGen was launched in conjunction with the Lausanne Younger Leaders Gathering (YLG) in August 2016, attended by over a thousand carefully selected younger leaders and mentors from about 150 countries, to faithfully steward the connections and fruit of YLG2016 for greater missional impact. YLGen is not just a commitment to younger leaders, but with the intention of building connections across generations. The vision for YLGen is to see ‘generations of Christ-like, Christ-following, and Christ-serving influencers connected across cultures in the global church’.

== Publications ==
Lausanne publications include The Lausanne Covenant, the Manila Manifesto and the Cape Town Commitment, many influential books, and a wealth of available online material from the whole Lausanne history, as well as specialized papers from global forums and consultations. These include workbooks for choosing strategies with which to evangelize to "unreached peoples". The documents of greatest significance to date are The Lausanne Covenant, which is used by evangelical mission organisations worldwide as a basis for faith, action and partnership, and The Cape Town Commitment which is "in two parts. Part l sets out biblical convictions, passed down to us in the scriptures, and Part ll sounds the call to action."

Lausanne also publishes occasional papers on its website. These landmark documents are known as Lausanne Occasional Papers (LOPs). Most of the early LOPs focus on Christian witness to specific groups such as Hindus, Buddhists, refugees and nominal Christians. The 2004 Forum in Pattaya generated 31 LOPs on a wide range of areas, including bioethics, business-as-mission, the persecution of Christians, and globalization.

The series of booklets, The Didasko Files, includes some Lausanne Movement documents such as a study guide to The Lausanne Covenant, written by the chief architect of the covenant, John Stott.

== Events ==
The three global congresses in Lausanne in 1974 (Lausanne I), Manila in 1989 (Lausanne II) and Cape Town in 2010 (Lausanne III) stand out as the most influential events to date. The three global leadership forums in Pattaya (1980 and 2004) and in Bangalore (2013) should also be mentioned, along with a long series of influential global consultations. Among the more important Lausanne events are also the global conferences with younger leaders called the Younger Leaders Gathering (YLG) held in Singapore (1987), in Kuala Lumpur (2006) and in Jakarta (2016).

== See also ==
- Child evangelism movement
- 10/40 window
