= Leighton Ford =

Canadian-American evangelist and author (born 1931)

- Born: October 22, 1931 (age 95); Chatham, Ontario, Canada
- Education: Wheaton College (B.A., Philosophy, 1952); Columbia Theological Seminary (M.Div)
- Occupation: Evangelist · Mentor · Author
- Years active: c. 1955–present
- Organizations: Leighton Ford Ministries; Billy Graham Evangelistic Association; Lausanne Movement
- Known for: Associate Evangelist & VP, Billy Graham Evangelistic Association (1955–1985); Chair, Lausanne Committee (1976–1992); founder of Leighton Ford Ministries
- Notable work: A Life of Listening: Discerning God’s Voice and Discovering Our Own (2019); Transforming Leadership: Jesus’ Way of Creating Vision, Shaping Values & Empowering Change (2006); The Attentive Life: Discerning God’s Presence in All Things (2008); Sandy: A Heart for God (1985)
- Spouse: Jean Graham Ford (m. 1953–2024)
- Children: 3
- Awards: Two Hungers Award (1990); Clergyman of the Year (1985); Presbyterian Preacher of the Year (1985)

Leighton Frederick Sandys McCrea Ford (born October 22, 1931) is a Canadian–American evangelist, author, and mentor. He was an associate evangelist and vice president of the Billy Graham Evangelistic Association (BGEA) for three decades and later founded Leighton Ford Ministries to focus on mentoring and spiritual formation. He also chaired the Lausanne Committee for World Evangelization from 1976 to 1992.

== Early life and education ==
Ford was born on October 22, 1931 in Chatham, Ontario, Canada. He was adopted as an infant and did not discover the identities of his birth parents until he was 50 years old. Ford began to attend a local Presbyterian church in his youth, and he was appointed president of his local Youth for Christ chapter at the age of 14 under the mentorship of Canadian evangelist Evon Hedley, making him the organization’s youngest chapter president at the time. He was later mentored by Billy Graham during high school, who encouraged him to attend Wheaton College in Illinois. After Wheaton, Ford pursued theological training at Columbia Theological Seminary in Decatur, Georgia.

In 1953, while still in seminary, Ford married Jean Graham, Billy Graham’s sister.

== Career ==
In 1955, Ford joined the Billy Graham Evangelistic Association (BGEA). He eventually became vice president of the BGEA, and worked closely with Graham until 1985.

Ford chaired the Lausanne Committee for World Evangelization from 1976 to 1992. During that period, he participated in international evangelical conferences and planning related to evangelism and missionary work.

Ford’s son Sandy died in 1981 at age 21 from complications of Wolff–Parkinson–White syndrome. In 1986, Ford established Leighton Ford Ministries, which developed mentoring and leadership programs for younger Christian leaders.

The ministry launched the Arrow Leadership Program, an 18-month nonresidential training program for emerging Christian leaders. Its curriculum included spiritual formation and evangelism alongside practical preparation for leadership. Through Arrow and other initiatives, Ford mentored hundreds of younger leaders. His mentoring also incorporated spiritual direction and personal reflection.

In the 1990s, Ford became interested in lectio divina and other contemplative Christian practices. He began offering individual spiritual direction, leading retreats, and organizing mentoring groups. By 1999, leadership of the Arrow program had passed to one of its graduates.

Lauren Winner described Ford’s later ministry as a shift from mass evangelism toward spiritual friendship and individual mentoring. Todd Hahn and James Osterhaus have also discussed Ford’s influence on Christian leadership through mentoring.

== Personal life ==
Ford is an artist and poet, and has described painting and drawing as forms of spiritual practice. He has stated that artwork and poetry are ways of "paying attention" in prayer.

Ford lived for many years in Charlotte, North Carolina, where he and his wife Jean were involved in the local community. Jean Graham Ford died in 2024. The couple had three children; their son Sandy predeceased them in 1981.

Ford is ordained as a Presbyterian minister.

== Selected publications ==
- Ford, Leighton. The Christian Persuader. Harper & Row, 1966.
- Ford, Leighton. Sandy: A Heart for God. InterVarsity Press, 1985.
- Ford, Leighton. Transforming Leadership: Jesus’ Way of Creating Vision, Shaping Values & Empowering Change. InterVarsity Press, 1991.
- Ford, Leighton. The Attentive Life: Discerning God’s Presence in All Things. IVP Books, 2008.
- Ford, Leighton. Meeting Jesus. 2nd ed., InterVarsity Press, 2015.
- Ford, Leighton. Good News Is for Sharing. Revised edition., Leighton Ford Ministries, 2017.
- Ford, Leighton. A Life of Listening: Discerning God’s Voice and Discovering Our Own. IVP Books, 2019.
