= Unreached people group =

Ethnic group without Christianity

In Christianity, an unreached people group is an ethnic group without an indigenous, self-propagating Christian church movement. Any ethnic or ethnolinguistic nation without enough Christians to evangelize the rest of the nation is an "unreached people group". It is a missiological term used by Evangelical Protestants. The Lausanne Committee for World Evangelization defines a people group as

"the largest group within which the gospel can spread as a church planting movement without encountering barriers of understanding or acceptance."

'Nation' is sometimes used interchangeably for "people group". The term is sometimes applied to ethnic groups in which less than 2% of the population is Evangelical Protestant Christian, Including nations where other forms of Christianity are prevalent such as Western Catholicism, Eastern Christianity or Judaism.

== Unreached People in North America ==
=== In Canada ===
- Lower British Columbia and Vancouver Island is reported to have around 10-20% of the population claiming to be of an Evangelical denomination.
- Montreal/Quebec City, Quebec are noted to be some of the most secular cities in Canada.
- Yukon Territory has a population of about 60% who claim to be 'unreligious'. The territory has the most indigenous people in Canada.
- Cape Breton Island, Nova Scotia has been estimated to have less than 1% born-again, Evangelical Christians.
- St. John's, Newfoundland is known to be the 'forgotten unreached people' where less than 1% attend an Evangelical church.

=== In United States ===
- Some regions in the State of Utah have near-zero Evangelical presence.
- New England (states of Maine, New Hampshire, Vermont, Massachusetts) is known to have the most unaffiliated or unreligious people in eastern USA. They are the least religious states in America.
- Metropolitan areas, like New York, San Diego, San Francisco, San Jose, Sacramento, Los Angeles, Miami, and Augusta have large regions of 'unreached' people.

== Unreached people in the 10/40 Window ==
10/40 Window

Large amounts of most of the countries in what is known as the 10/40 window are known to be 'unreached people groups'. This list of countries is from His Feet International Ministries.

- Albania: A predominantly Muslim nation with a growing Christian presence and a history of religious tolerance.
- Algeria: A predominantly Muslim nation with a small but growing Christian presence, facing challenges of religious restrictions and cultural barriers.
- Bahrain: An island nation with a diverse religious landscape, including a significant expatriate Christian community, but with limited religious freedom for non-Muslims.
- Egypt: Home to a large Coptic Christian minority facing discrimination and persecution, with a growing evangelical movement amidst societal challenges.
- Iran: A theocratic Islamic Republic with a persecuted Christian minority, primarily converts from Islam, facing significant risks and restrictions.
- Iraq: A country recovering from conflict, with a dwindling Christian population facing displacement and security concerns, yet resilient in their faith.
- Israel: A Jewish state with a complex religious and political landscape, home to a diverse Christian community and a significant site for biblical pilgrimage.
- Jordan: A predominantly Muslim nation with a small Christian minority, known for its religious tolerance and historical biblical sites.
- Kuwait: A wealthy Gulf state with a large expatriate Christian community, but with limited religious freedom for non-Muslims and restrictions on evangelism.
- Lebanon: A diverse country with a significant Christian population, facing political instability and economic challenges, yet a beacon of religious coexistence in the region.
- Libya: A nation in transition after years of conflict, with a small Christian minority facing security concerns and limited religious freedom.
- Morocco: A predominantly Muslim nation with a small Christian community, facing restrictions on religious expression and conversion.
- Oman: A Gulf state with a small Christian minority, primarily expatriates, with limited religious freedom but a growing openness to interfaith dialogue.
- Qatar: A wealthy Gulf state with a large expatriate Christian community, but with limited religious freedom for non-Muslims and restrictions on evangelism.
- Saudi Arabia: A conservative Islamic monarchy with strict religious laws and no official recognition of Christianity, making it a challenging environment for Christian witness.
- Syria: A nation ravaged by war, with a dwindling Christian population facing displacement, persecution, and immense suffering.
- Tunisia: A predominantly Muslim nation with a small Christian minority, known for its relative openness and religious tolerance compared to other countries in the region.
- Turkey: A predominantly Muslim nation with a rich Christian heritage, but with a declining Christian population facing societal pressures and discrimination.
- United Arab Emirates: A federation of Gulf states with a large expatriate Christian community, but with limited religious freedom for non-Muslims and restrictions on evangelism.
- West Bank / Gaza: A territory (in Israel) with a predominantly Muslim population and a small Christian minority, facing political conflict and humanitarian challenges.
- Yemen: A war-torn nation with a small and vulnerable Christian minority facing persecution and extreme hardship.

=== West and Central Africa ===
- Benin: A diverse nation with a mix of traditional religions, Christianity, and Islam, with a growing Christian population and a history of religious tolerance.
- Burkina Faso: A predominantly Muslim nation with a significant Christian minority, facing challenges of poverty, instability, and extremist violence.
- Chad: A diverse nation with a mix of Christianity, Islam, and traditional religions, facing challenges of poverty, conflict, and limited religious freedom.
- Djibouti: A strategically located nation with a predominantly Muslim population and a small Christian minority, facing challenges of poverty and limited religious freedom.
- Eritrea: A one-party state with strict religious controls, with a persecuted Christian minority facing imprisonment and torture for their faith.
- Ethiopia: A diverse nation with a large Christian population, primarily Orthodox, facing challenges of ethnic conflict, poverty, and religious tensions.
- Gambia: A predominantly Muslim nation with a small Christian minority, known for its relative religious tolerance and peaceful coexistence.
- Guinea: A predominantly Muslim nation with a significant Christian minority, facing challenges of poverty, political instability, and limited religious freedom.
- Guinea-Bissau: A predominantly Muslim nation with a significant Christian minority, facing challenges of poverty, political instability, and limited religious freedom.
- Mali: A predominantly Muslim nation with a small Christian minority, facing challenges of poverty, conflict, and extremist violence.
- Mauritania: A predominantly Muslim nation with strict Islamic laws and a history of slavery, making it a challenging environment for Christian witness.
- Niger: A predominantly Muslim nation with a small Christian minority, facing challenges of poverty, conflict, and limited religious freedom.
- Senegal: A predominantly Muslim nation with a significant Christian minority, known for its religious tolerance and peaceful coexistence.
- Sudan: A nation divided by conflict and religious tensions, with a persecuted Christian minority in the north and a growing Christian presence in the south.
- Western Sahara: A disputed territory with a predominantly Muslim population and limited religious freedom.

=== South and Central Asia ===
- Afghanistan: A predominantly Muslim nation with a tiny and persecuted Christian minority, facing extreme restrictions on religious freedom and conversion.
- Azerbaijan: A predominantly Muslim nation nestled at the crossroads of Eastern Europe and Western Asia.
- Bangladesh: A predominantly Muslim nation with a small Christian minority, facing societal discrimination and occasional violence.
- Bhutan: A Buddhist kingdom with a small Christian minority, facing restrictions on religious freedom and evangelism.
- India: A diverse nation with a large Hindu majority and a significant Christian minority, facing challenges of religious tensions, caste discrimination, and poverty.
- Kazakhstan: A predominantly Muslim nation with a significant Russian Orthodox minority and a growing evangelical Christian presence.
- Kyrgyzstan: A predominantly Muslim nation with a significant Russian Orthodox minority and a growing evangelical Christian presence.
- Maldives: A Muslim nation with no official recognition of Christianity and strict restrictions on religious freedom.
- Nepal: A predominantly Hindu nation with a growing Christian minority, facing challenges of poverty, political instability, and occasional religious tensions.
- Pakistan: A predominantly Muslim nation with a small Christian minority facing discrimination, persecution, and blasphemy laws.
- Tajikistan: A predominantly Muslim nation with a small Christian minority facing restrictions on religious freedom and evangelism.
- Turkmenistan: A predominantly Muslim nation with a small Christian minority facing restrictions on religious freedom and evangelism.
- Uzbekistan: A predominantly Muslim nation with a small Christian minority facing restrictions on religious freedom and evangelism.

=== East Asia and Southeast Asia ===
- Brunei: A Muslim nation with strict Islamic laws and severe restrictions on religious freedom for non-Muslims.
- Cambodia: A predominantly Buddhist nation with a small Christian minority, facing challenges of poverty, corruption, and limited religious freedom.
- China: A officially atheist nation with a large and growing Christian population, facing varying degrees of restrictions and persecution depending on the region and denomination.
- Indonesia: The world's most populous Muslim-majority nation with a significant Christian minority, facing challenges of religious tensions, extremism, and natural disasters.
- Japan: A predominantly Shinto and Buddhist nation with a small Christian minority, facing challenges of secularism, cultural barriers, and reaching a resistant population.
- Laos: A communist state with a predominantly Buddhist population and a small Christian minority, facing restrictions on religious freedom and evangelism.
- Malaysia: A predominantly Muslim nation with a significant Christian minority, facing challenges of religious tensions and restrictions on evangelism to Muslims.
- Mongolia: A predominantly Buddhist nation with a small but growing Christian minority, facing challenges of poverty and cultural barriers.
- Myanmar (Burma): A predominantly Buddhist nation with a persecuted Christian minority, particularly among ethnic groups, facing conflict, displacement, and discrimination.
- North Korea: A totalitarian state with severe restrictions on religious freedom, making it one of the most difficult places in the world for Christians to practice their faith.
- Taiwan: A predominantly Buddhist and Taoist nation with a significant Christian minority, known for its religious freedom and openness to the gospel.
- Thailand: A predominantly Buddhist nation with a small Christian minority, facing challenges of reaching a resistant population and cultural barriers.
- Vietnam: A communist state with a large Buddhist population and a significant Christian minority, facing varying degrees of restrictions on religious freedom depending on the denomination and region.
- Timor-Leste: A predominantly Catholic nation with a young and growing church, facing challenges of poverty and rebuilding after years of conflict.

== Unreached people groups outside of the 10/40 Window ==
- Large amounts of people in South America are 'unreached':
  - Argentina: A predominantly Catholic nation with a small, growing Evangelical minority.
  - Bolivia: A predominantly historic Catholic nation with steadily growing Evangelical minority. About 15% identifying to be Evangelical Christians.
  - Brazil: A predominantly Catholic country with rapidly growing Evangelical presence. About 27% identify with the Evangelical church.
  - Chile: A historically Catholic nation with stable Evangelical minority. About 15% of Chileans claim to be born-again Christian, most identifying with the Pentecostal denomination..
  - Colombia: A predominantly Catholic nation with significant and growing Evangelical influence.
  - Ecuador: A predominantly Catholic nation with a growing Evangelical influence, especially in the indigenous communities.
  - Falkland Islands (UK): A predominantly Anglican and Catholic nation with a significant and growing Evangelical presence.
  - French Guiana (FR): A predominantly Catholic nation with around 5% identifying as Evangelical Christian.
  - Guyana: A predominantly Evangelical Pentecostal nation, with a significant and growing Christian majority of 64% of the population.
  - Paraguay: A predominantly Catholic nation with 6-9% identifying with the Evangelical church.
  - Peru: A predominantly Catholic nation with only around 4% identifying as born-again Christians.
  - Suriname: A predominantly Catholic nation with a steadily growing Evangelical influence.
  - Uruguay: A predominantly atheist or Catholic nation with a growing Evangelical influence.
  - Venezuela: A predominantly Catholic nation with 17–20% identifying with the Evangelical church.

== See also ==
- Great Commission
- Persecution of Christians
- Uncontacted peoples
- 10/40 window
