= 10/40 window =

Area focused on in Christian missions

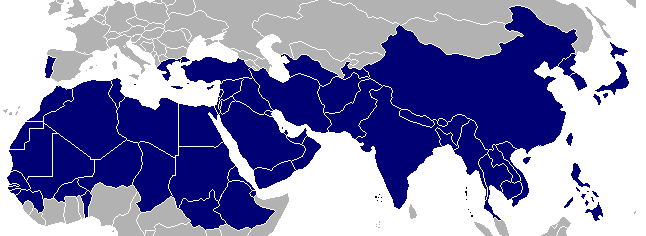
The nations in the 10/40 window

The 10/40 window is a term coined by Christian missionary strategist and Partners International CEO Luis Bush in 1990 to refer to those regions of the Eastern Hemisphere, plus the European and African part of the Western Hemisphere, located between 10 and 40 degrees north of the equator, a general area that was purported to have the highest level of socioeconomic challenges and least access to the Christian message and Christian resources (Note: "Access" is generally defined using a variety of metrics. What is least controversial is those areas with least access throughout history, as all metrics for such areas are zero or close to zero. Examples of metrics used include the presence of (Christian) work and workers (of any kind, whether community development, health, business, child care, house servants, etc.), media in an appropriate language (print, TV, radio, web, etc.)) on the planet.

The concept behind the 10/40 window highlights these three elements (as of data available in 1990): an area of the world with great poverty and low quality of life, combined with lack of access to Christian resources and unreached non-Christians. The window forms a band encompassing Saharan and Northern Africa, as well as almost all of Asia (West Asia, Central Asia, South Asia, East Asia and much of Southeast Asia). Roughly two-thirds of the world population lives in the 10/40 window, and it is predominantly Muslim, Hindu, Buddhist, Jewish, animist, or atheist. Many governments in the 10/40 window are officially or unofficially opposed to Christian missionary work of any kind within their borders.

== Origin ==
This region of the world was previously known to Christians as the "resistant belt", as noted by Luis Bush at the 1989 Lausanne II Conference in Manila. In 1990, Bush's research led to a meeting with Pete Holzmann, a leader of the team developing the first PC-based geographic information system (GIS) software. They analyzed the region using a box between 10 and 40 degrees north latitude, and called it the "10/40 box". A few weeks later, Bush and his wife Doris were inspired to rename it the 10/40 window, stating that this region ought to be seen as a "window of opportunity". The analysis and concept was a generalization that focuses on a region, not a sharp boundary defining what is a priority, and what is not. For this reason, many missiologists prefer to use the phrase "10/40 window region".

Before being called the "resistant belt", the Islamic portions of this region, as well as selected unreached Buddhist and Hindu areas, were referred to as the "unoccupied fields" by Samuel Zwemer, in his book by that same title, published in 1911.

The concept was first published in the AD2000 magazine in 1990.

== Controversy ==
Some researchers have objected to such a broad-brush term which seems to imply a unifying characteristic of the 10/40 window, when in fact no large area of the planet is completely homogenous in cultural attributes.

The 1990 research data states:

- this part of the world was home to the largest populations living in deep poverty and lowest quality of life;
- this part of the world did have least access to Christian resources. Note the emphasis on access not percent Christian. The West has ubiquitous access to such resources; this area of the world did and does not.

This research deals in overall population characteristics. "10/40 window" is a term that helps people visualize the general area of the analysis, where the above characteristics are generally true, but with exceptions proving it is only a generalization. Some examples of the exceptions:

- The 10/40 window article refers to the "poorest of the poor" living in that region (based on late-1980s per-capita GNP under US$500). Of the three billion people living in such poverty-stricken nations, 82% lived in the 10/40 window. Yet the window also includes nations such as South Korea and Japan. In the late 20th century, Japan boasted the world's third largest economy, and South Korea the eleventh. Such nations were strong throughout the late 20th century.
- Geographically, the 10/40 window includes the Philippines and Portugal, which both have a Roman Catholic Christian majority; Greece, where almost 98% of the population belonged to the Greek Orthodox Church; Cyprus, where Christianity accounts for over 70% of the population; South Korea, which is home to the largest single congregation church in the world and is also the second largest missionary-sending nation in the world; and Ethiopia, which is a majority-Christian country. The 10/40 window does not encompass Indonesia or Sri Lanka, nations that had very little access to Christian resources.

To address these concerns, the list of 10/40 countries has been amended in recent years to omit Greece, Portugal and the Philippines.

Additionally, the concept has been critiqued as "[reflecting] a US Evangelical worldview" which may not be shared by other Christians.

== Use ==
Over the years, the 10/40 window has evolved from a specialist term used by Christian missiologists to assumed vocabulary for Christians in the West. It is an emerging term in the secular press and can be found in press style glossaries. Non-western writers and organizations also refer to the 10/40 window. In addition, those opposed to the idea of evangelism make use of the term.

The concept has also been a part of spiritual warfare theology. It is linked to spiritual mapping of territorial spirits (demons believed to control regions of the globe and prevent Christian conversion), as promoted by C. Peter Wagner, founder of the New Apostolic Reformation. Ted Haggard's New Life Church was at the vanguard of the spiritual mapping movement through its close ties to and support of Wagner and Bush. It and Wagner helped initiate the "Praying Through the Window" events in the 1990s, which had tens of millions of participants. New Life Church's spiritual warfare center, the World Prayer Center, opened in 1998 and primarily focused on the 10/40 window.

== Analysis ==
The original 1990 GIS 10/40 window analysis produced several insights, among them showing that the nations of the 10/40 window represented (as of the research date):

- 82% of the poorest of the world's poor (per capita GNP less than US$500 per year),
- 84% of those with lowest quality of life (life expectancy, infant mortality, and literacy),
- the hub of the world's major non-Christian religions (Islam, Buddhism, Hinduism, etc.,)
- close to 100% of those who were both most-poor and had least-access to Christian resources (two-dimensional analysis)
- The least Christian resource investment and least sharing of the Christian message

The GIS analysis utilized country-level data from the Operation World almanac, the World Christian Encyclopedia, and The World Factbook.

=== Non-Christians in the 10/40 window by religion ===
The first edition GIS analysis maps highlighted the three major religious blocks in the 10/40 window, specifically the majority Muslim, Hindu and Buddhist nations. Population estimates at the time for the year 2000 (from Operation World) were given as:

- 28 Muslim countries, 1.1 billion population est. (2000)
- 2 Hindu countries, 1.1 billion population est. (2000)
- 8 Buddhist countries, 237 million population est. (2000)

Later updates have been based more on census data and other estimates rather than forward-looking population estimates. The cited reference provides the following estimate of "unreached" non-Christian populations in the 10/40 window:

- 865 million Muslims
- 550 million Hindus
- 275 million Buddhists
- 140 million in 2550 tribal groups (mainly animist)
- 17 million Jews

=== Nations in the 10/40 window ===
The 10/40 window originally encompassed the following 54 countries.

1. Afghanistan
2. Algeria
3. Bahrain
4. Bangladesh
5. Benin
6. Bhutan
7. Burkina Faso
8. Cambodia
9. Chad
10. China
11. Cyprus
12. Djibouti
13. Egypt
14. Eritrea
15. Ethiopia
16. Gambia
17. Guinea
18. Guinea-Bissau
19. India
20. Iran
21. Iraq
22. Israel
23. Japan
24. Jordan
25. Korea (North)
26. Korea (South)
27. Kuwait
28. Laos
29. Lebanon
30. Libya
31. Mali
32. Malta
33. Mauritania
34. Morocco
35. Myanmar
36. Nepal
37. Niger
38. Oman
39. Pakistan
40. Qatar
41. Saudi Arabia
42. Senegal
43. Sudan (at the time including South Sudan)
44. Syria
45. Taiwan
46. Tajikistan
47. Thailand
48. Tunisia
49. Turkey
50. Turkmenistan
51. United Arab Emirates
52. Vietnam
53. Western Sahara
54. Yemen

These were all Old World nations (mostly in the Eastern Hemisphere) with at least 50 percent of their land area falling within 10 to 40 degrees latitude as of 1990. (The list also included Gibraltar and Macau, which are not independent nations.)

== Related concepts ==
The terms "40/70 window", referring to Europe and Russia, and "4/14 window", referring to the ages between 4 and 14 for child evangelism, were also coined based on the 10/40 window concept.

== See also ==
- 1040 (film)
- Great Commission
- Human Development Index, which followed from the Quality of Life Index used in the 10/40 window research

== Bibliography ==
- Aikman, David (January 2002). "Becoming Global Christians in the 21st century". Charisma Magazine. Archived from the original on February 15, 2008.
- Allen, John L (September 2006). "Evangelicals Look To 10/40 Window". National Catholic Reporter. Archived from the original on September 27, 2007.
- Blumenthal, Max (April 15, 2003). "Onward Christian Soldiers". Salon. Archived from the original on December 10, 2006.
- Dicker, John (April 3, 2003). "Guerillas for God". CS Independent. Archived from the original on February 3, 2007.
- Han, Ju Hui Judy (2007). "Geography PhD Dissertation Summary Comix". Archived from the original on September 30, 2007.
- Hillman, Os (2004). "The Faith At Work Movement". Christianity Today. Archived from the original on February 19, 2007.
- Holvast, René (2008). Spiritual Mapping: The Turbulent Career of a Contested American Missionary Paradigm, 1989–2005 (PDF) (Thesis). University of Utrecht. ISBN 978-90-393-4829-1.
- Long, Justin (January 2001). "Islam and China's Christmas". Charisma Magazine. Archived from the original on February 15, 2008.
- "Glossary". Style Guide. Adventist News Network. 2007.
- "Macedonian Project Information". Macedonian Project. Archived from the original on February 3, 2001.
- "Serving Persecuted Christians Worldwide". Open Doors. Archived from the original on February 13, 2007.
- "Sri Lanka". Society for World Internet Mission. Archived from the original on July 2, 2001.
- Walker, J Gary (April 2003). "Marli Spieker, Broadcasting Hope". Christianity Today. Archived from the original on February 15, 2007.
