= Lausanne Congress of Supreme Councils of 1875 =

Freemasonry review of the 1786 Scottish Rite

The Lausanne Congress of 1875, held in Lausanne, Switzerland, was a historic effort of eleven Supreme Councils to review and reform the Grand Constitutions of The Ancient and Accepted Scottish Rite of Freemasonry of 1786. The Congress took place from 6–22 September 1875 with representation from the Supreme Councils of England (and Wales), Belgium, Cuba, Scotland, France, Greece, Hungary, Italy, Peru, Portugal and the hosting nation, Switzerland. The Scottish representative, who also represented the Supreme Council of Greece, left before the Congress reached its conclusion. On the closing date, nine representatives signed the final Declaration and Treaty.

Although many different aspects were discussed, concerns over the Deistic approach of a belief in a Creative Principle on the one hand and the Theistic approach of a belief in a Supreme Being on the other took such precedence as to hinder other proceedings. It was not until 1877 that a conciliatory position on the matter was reached through the mediation of the Swiss Supreme Council.

Largely unknown to Freemasons these days, the Lausanne Congress and the events leading up to it, both on the European mainland and in the United States, as well as developments after its conclusion provide a remarkable insight into the politics of Grand Lodge foreign relations.
