= First International Congress on World Evangelization =

Christian organization

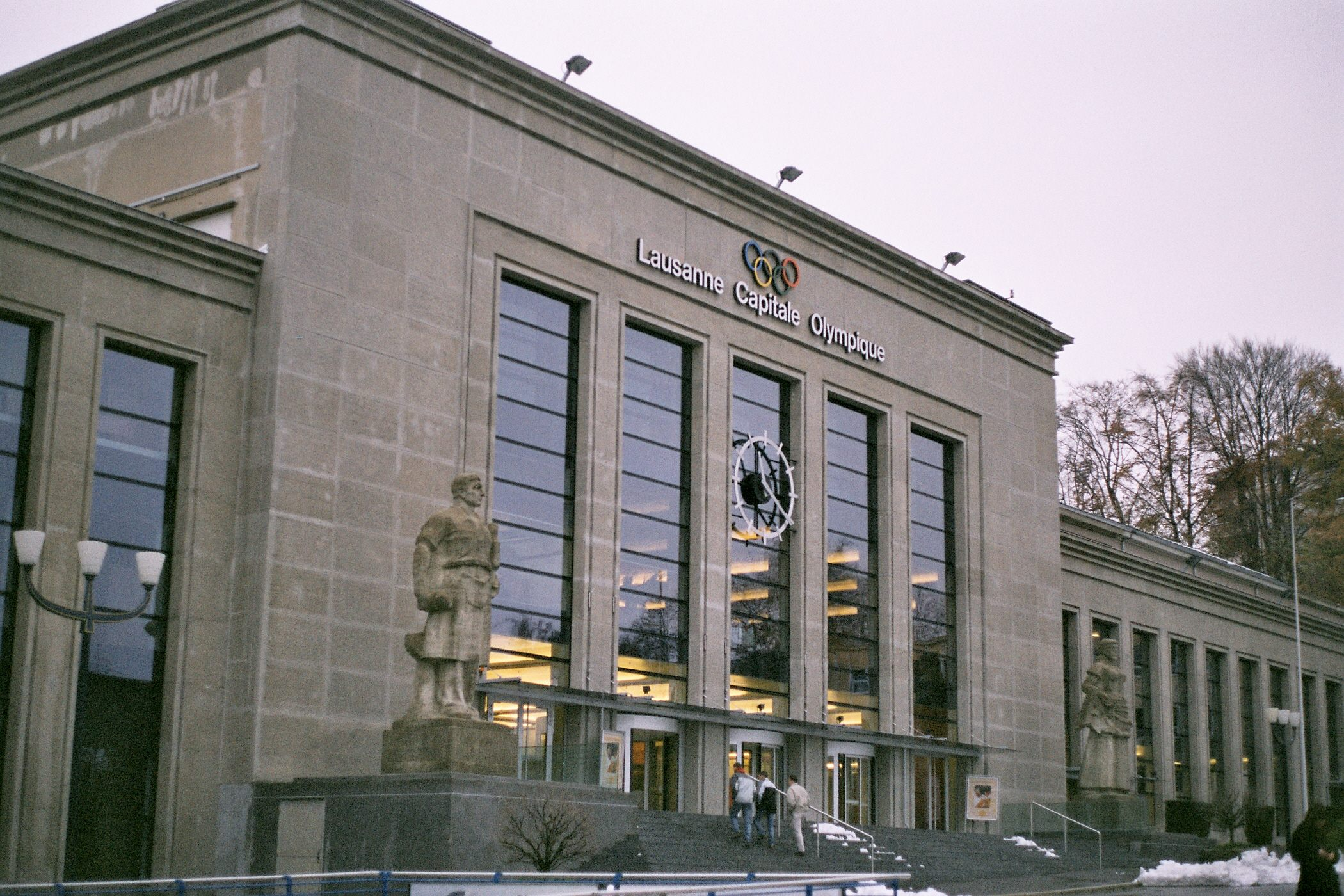
Palais de Beaulieu

The First International Congress on World Evangelization (ICOWE), also sometimes called the Lausanne Congress or Lausanne '74, was a Christian conference held from 16 to 25 July 1974 in Switzerland.

The conference is noted for producing the Lausanne Covenant, one of the major documents of modern evangelical Christianity. The drafting committee of the covenant was headed by John Stott of England.

The movement claims to follow in the footsteps of the 1910 World Missionary Conference.

== History ==
The congress started as a plan announced by American evangelist Billy Graham in August 1972 to hold an international congress on evangelism as a follow-up to the 1966 World Congress on Evangelism held in Berlin, West Germany. The conference was called by a committee headed by Graham and brought together religious leaders from 150 nations. Lausanne was selected for the congress in October 1972. The congress office opened in April 1973. The theme of the congress was "Let the earth hear His voice."

Almost 2,700 evangelical Christian leaders attended the conference at the Palais de Beaulieu in Lausanne, Switzerland to discuss the progress, resources and methods of evangelizing the world. The reports and papers at the congress helped to illustrate the shift of Christianity's center of gravity from Europe and North America to Africa, Asia and Latin America.

Millie Dienert chaired the prayer committee at the Lausanne conference. After the congress, the Lausanne Committee for World Evangelization was established.

The conference was attended by, among others, Francis Schaeffer, journalist Malcolm Muggeridge and bishop Jack Dain.

== Legacy ==
The Second International Congress on World Evangelization was held fifteen years later in Manila.

The Third International Congress on World Evangelization was held in Cape Town, South Africa, from 16 to 25 October 2010.

A fourth congress was held in Incheon, Seoul, South Korea in September 2024.
