= List of cathedrals in Brazil =

This is the list of cathedrals in Brazil sorted by denomination.

== Catholic ==
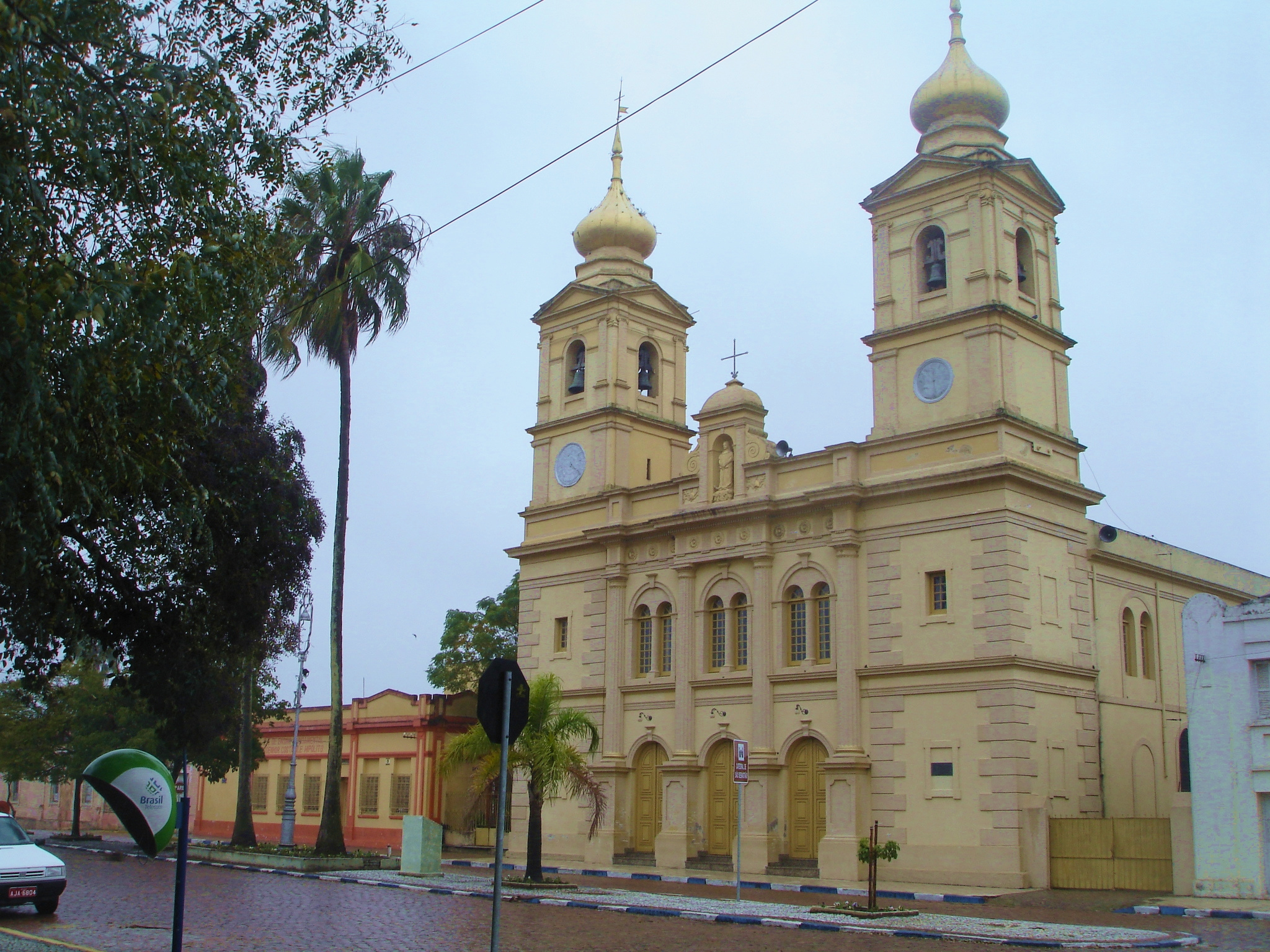
Cathedral of St. Sebastian in Bagé.

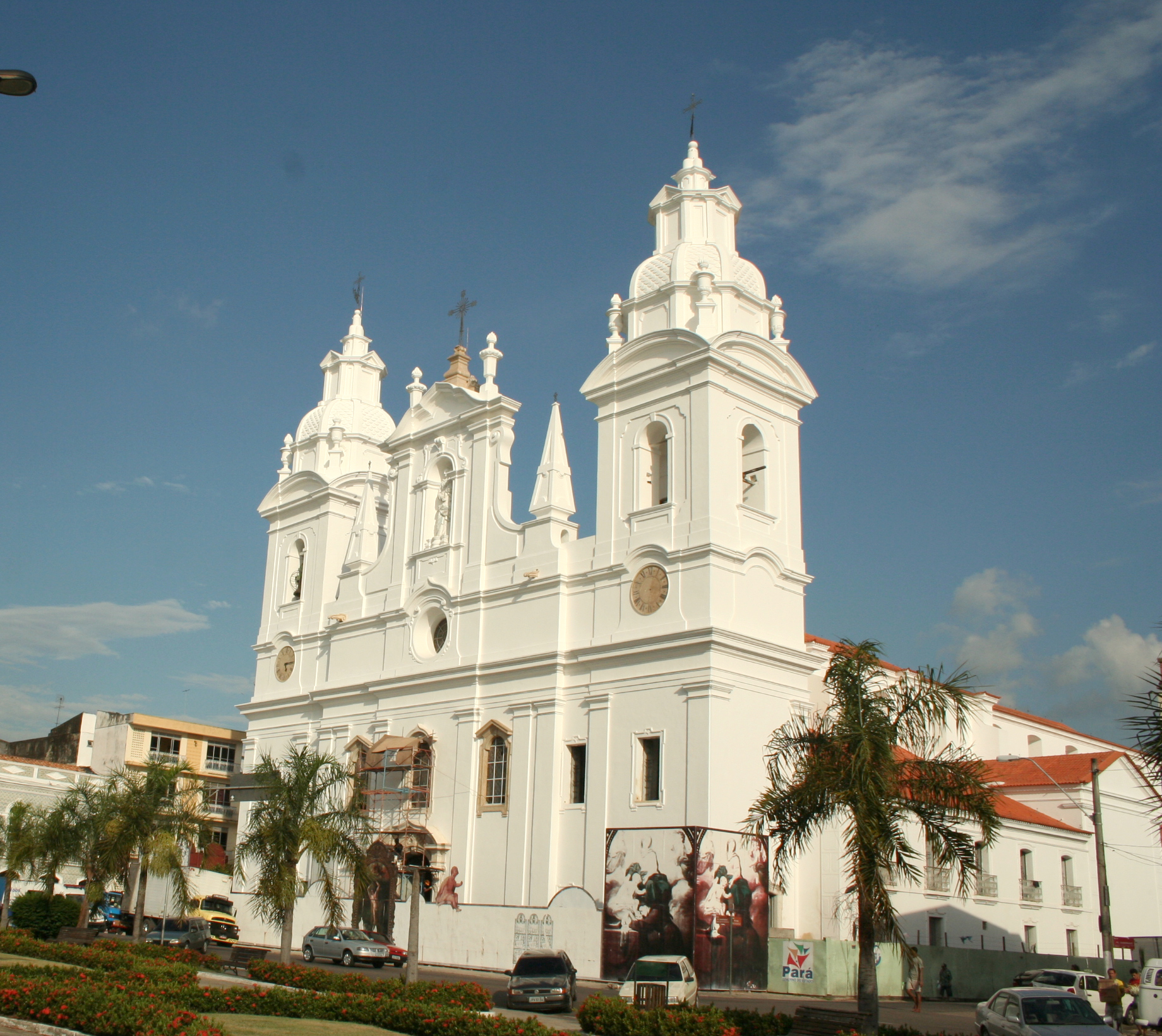
Metropolitan Cathedral of Our Lady of Nazaré in Belém.

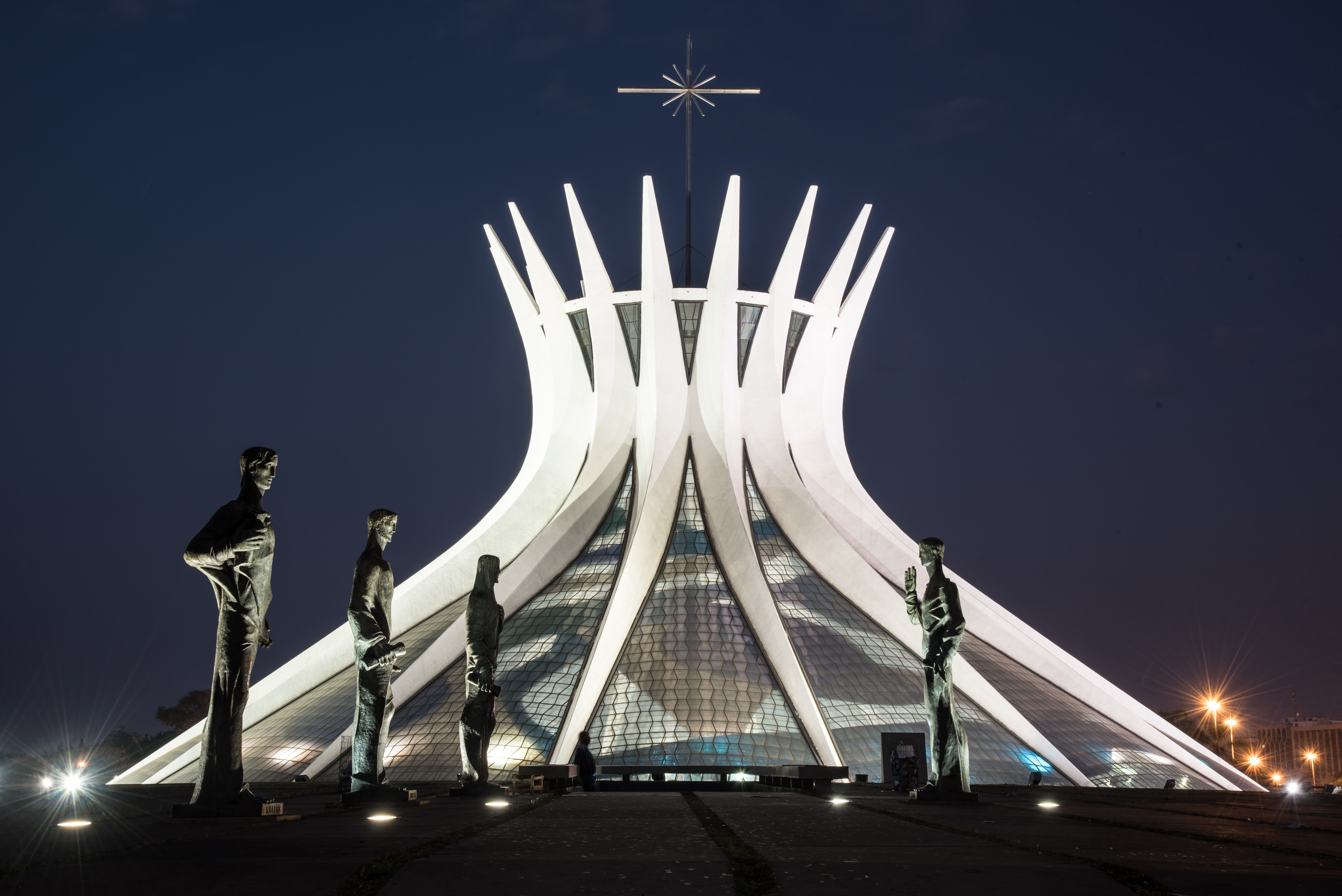
Metropolitan Cathedral of Our Lady of Aparecida in Brasília.

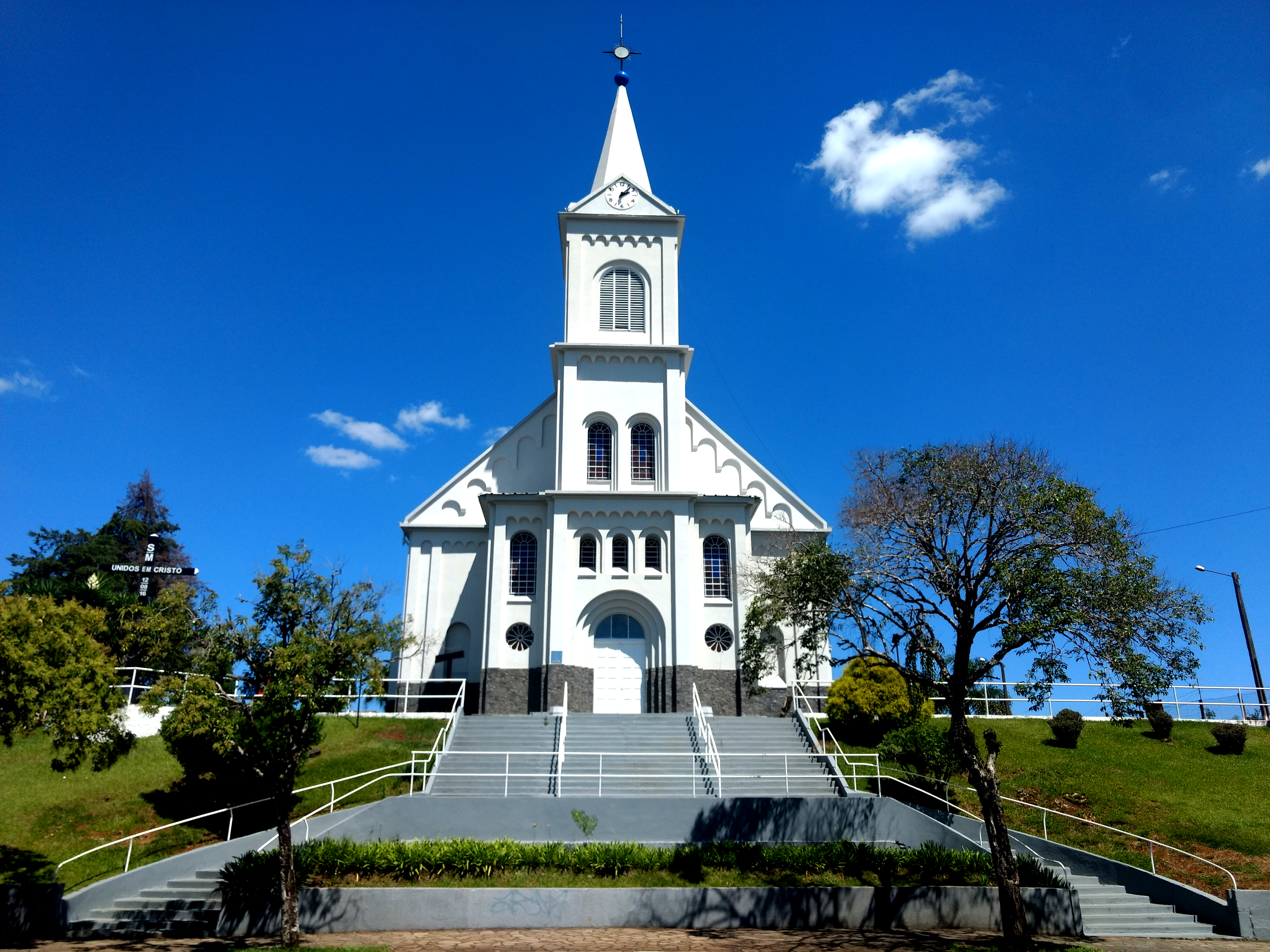
Cathedral of St. Francis of Assisi in Caçador.

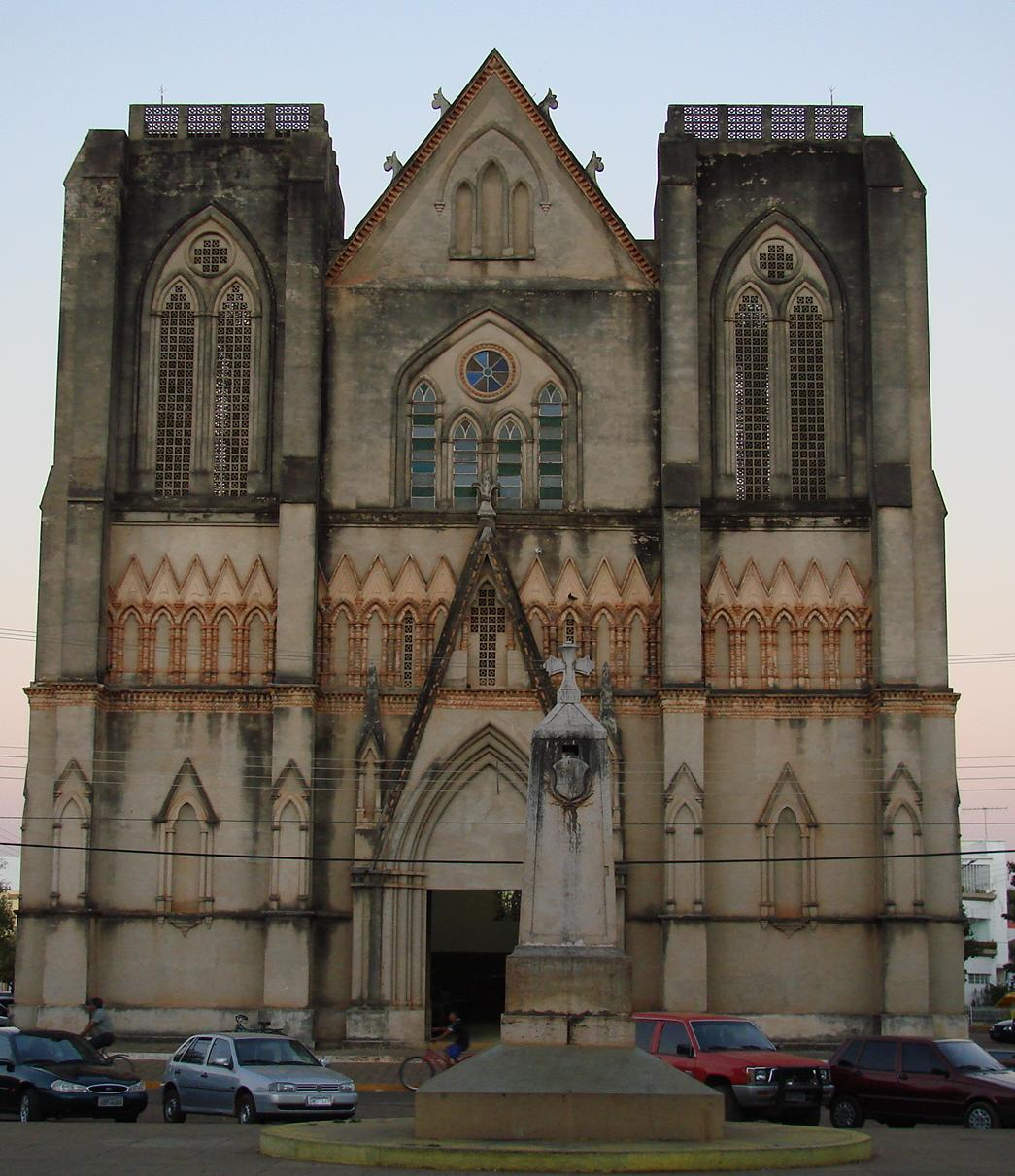
Cathedral of St. Louis of France in Cáceres.

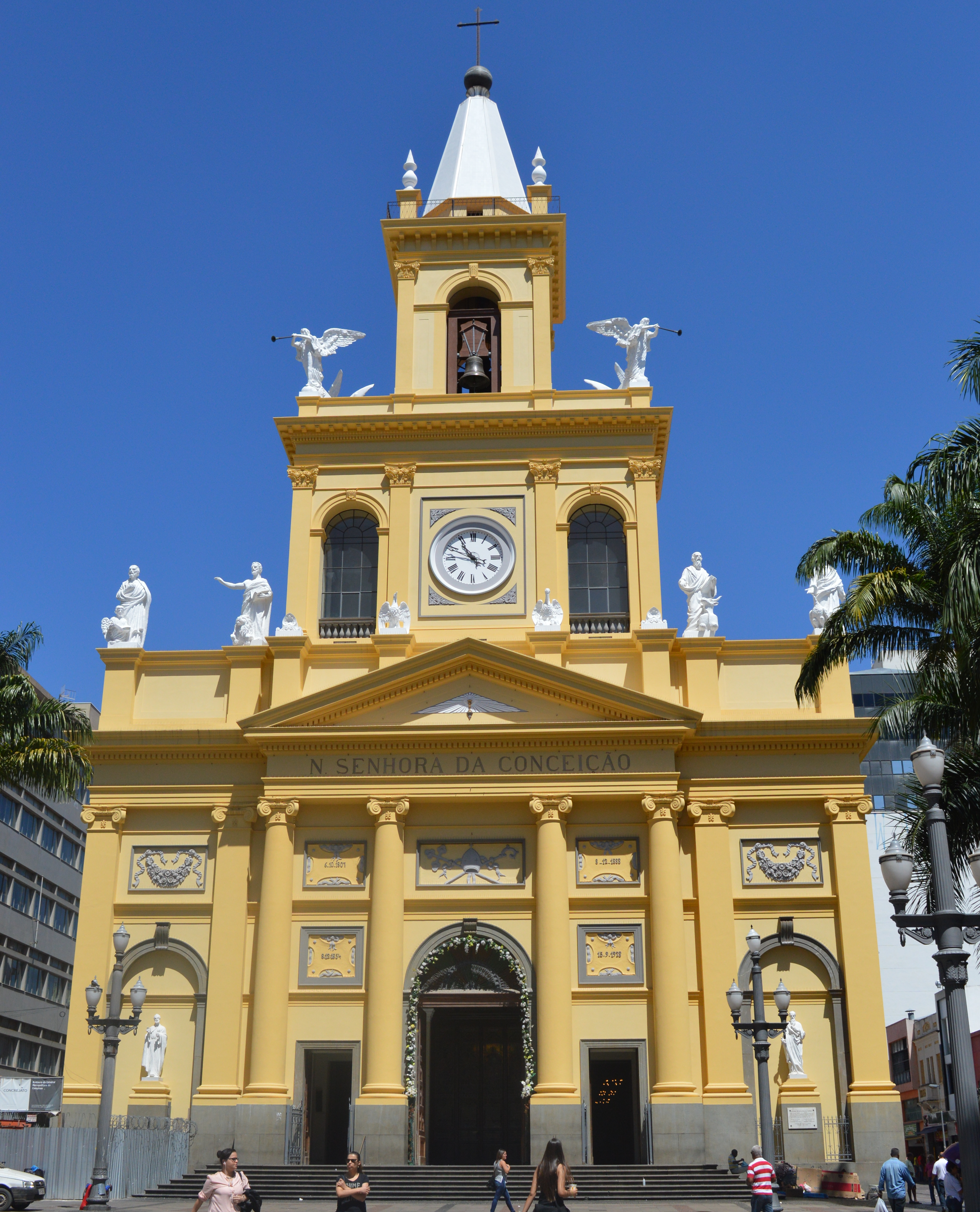
Metropolitan Cathedral of Our Lady of the Conception in Campinas.

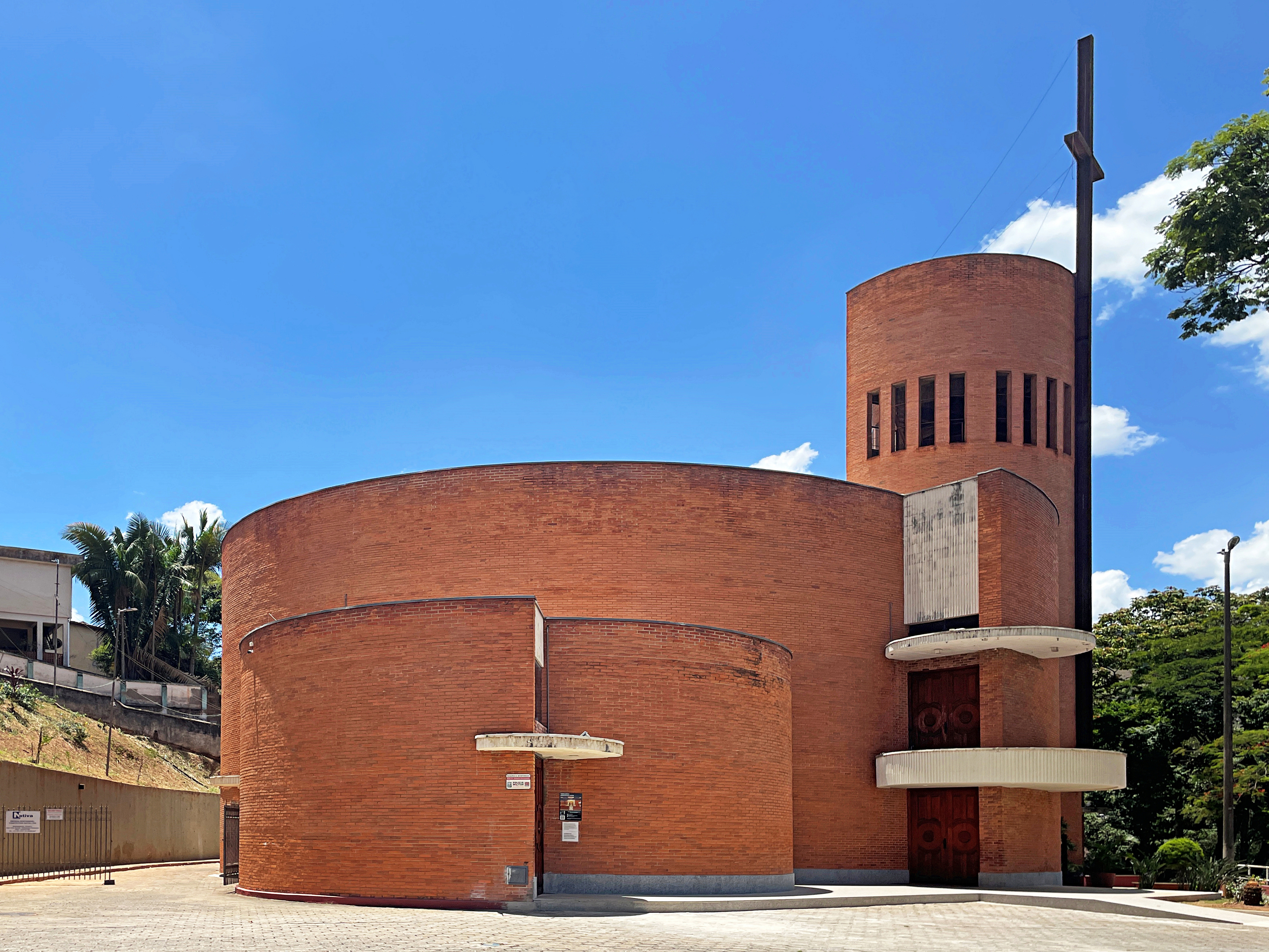
Cathedral of Our Lady of the Rosary in Itabira.

Cathedrals of the Catholic Church in Brazil:

- Catedral Nossa Senhora da Conceição Peri in Abaetetuba
- Catedral Senhor Bom Jesus dos Remédios in Afogados da Ingazeira
- Cathedral of St. Anthony in Alagoinhas
- Cathedral of St. John the Baptist in Almenara
- Cathedral of the Holy Guardian Angels in Tabatinga
- Co-Cathedral of St. Paul the Apostle in São Paulo de Olivença
- Cathedral of Our Lady of Good Counsel in Amargosa
- Armenian Cathedral of St. Gregory the Illuminator in São Paulo (Armenian Catholic)
- Cathedral of Our Lady in Amparo
- Cathedral of the Good Lord Jesus in Anápolis
- Cathedral of St. Anthony in Guaratinguetá
- Cathedral of Our Lady of Lourdes in Petrópolis
- Cathedral Basilica of the National Shrine of Our Lady Aparecida in Aparecida
- Metropolitan Cathedral of Our Lady of the Conception in Aracaju
- Cathedral of Our Lady of Apparition in Araçatuba
- Cathedral of St. Joseph in Araçuaí
- Cathedral of the Sacred Heart of Jesus in Assis
- Cathedral of St. Therese in Bacabal
- Cathedral of St. Sebastian in Bagé
- Cathedral of St. Francis of Assisi in Barra
- Cathedral of Our Lady of Guidance in Barra do Garças
- Cathedral of St. Ann in Barra do Piraí
- Cathedral of St. John the Baptist in Barreiras
- Cathedral of the Holy Spirit in Barretos
- Cathedral of the Holy Spirit in Bauru
- Metropolitan Cathedral of Our Lady of Graces in Belém
- Christ the King Cathedral in Belo Horizonte
- Catedral Metropolitana Nossa Senhora da Boa Viagem in Belo Horizonte
- Cathedral of St. Paul the Apostle in Blumenau
- Cathedral of the Good Jesus in Bom Jesus da Lapa
- Cathedral of Our Lady of Mercy in Bom Jesus
- Cathedral of Our Lord of the Good End in Senhor do Bonfim
- Prelatial Cathedral Basilica of St. Anthony of Padua in Borba
- Metropolitan Cathedral-Basilica of St. Ann in Botucatu
- Cathedral of Our Lady of the Rosary in Bragança
- Cathedral of Our Lady of the Conception in Bragança Paulista
- Metropolitan Cathedral of Our Lady of Apparition in Brasília
- Cathedral of Our Lady of the Conception in Brejo
- Cathedral of St. Francis of Assisi in Caçador
- Cathedral of Our Lady of the Conception in Cachoeira do Sul
- Cathedral of St. Peter the Apostle in Cachoeiro de Itapemirim
- Cathedral of St. Ann in Caetité
- Cathedral of St. Ann in Caicó
- Cathedral of Our Lady of Mercy in Cajazeiras
- Cathedral of St. Thomas of Canterbury in Camaçari
- Prelatial Cathedral of St. John the Baptist in Cametá
- Cathedral of St. Anthony in Campanha
- Cathedral of Our Lady of the Conception in Campina Grande
- Metropolitan Cathedral of Our Lady of the Conception in Campinas
- Metropolitan Cathedral of Our Lady of the Abbey and St. Anthony in Campo Grande
- Cathedral of St. Jude Thaddeus in Campo Limpo Paulista
- Cathedral of St. Anthony in Campo Maior
- Cathedral of St. Joseph in Campo Mourão
- Cathedral-Basilica of the Most Holy Saviour in Campos dos Goytacazes
- Cathedral Basilica of St. Louis Gonzaga in Novo Hamburgo, Rio Grande do Sul
- Cathedral of the Holy Spirit in Caraguatatuba
- Cathedral of St. John the Baptist in Caratinga
- Cathedral of St. Peter of Alcantara in Carolina
- Cathedral of Our Lady of the Dolours in Caruaru
- Metropolitan Cathedral of Our Lady of Apparition in Cascavel
- Cathedral of Mary Mother of God in Castanhal
- Cathedral Shrine of Our Lady of Apparition in Catanduva
- Cathedral of Our Lady of the Remedies in Caxias
- Cathedral of St. Teresa in Caxias do Sul
- Cathedral of St. Anthony of Padua in Chapecó
- Prelatial Cathedral of St. Ann and St. Sebastian in Coari
- Cathedral of the Sacred Heart of Jesus in Colatina
- Cathedral of Christ the King in Cornélio Procópio
- Cathedral of Our Lady of Mercy in Coroatá
- Cathedral of Our Lady of Candelaria in Corumbá
- Cathedral of St. Joseph in Coxim
- Cathedral of Our Lord of the Good End in Crateús
- Cathedral of Our Lady of the Rock in Crato
- Cathedral of St. Joseph in Criciúma
- Prelatial Cathedral of Our Lady of Perpetual Help in Cristalândia
- Cathedral of the Holy Spirit in Cruz Alta
- Cathedral of Our Lady of Glory in Cruzeiro do Sul
- Metropolitan Cathedral-Basilica of the Good Lord Jesus in Cuiabá
- Catedral Metropolitana Basílica Nossa Senhora da Luz dos Pinhais in Curitiba
- Metropolitan Cathedral of St. Anthony in Diamantina
- Cathedral of the Immaculate Conception in Diamantino
- Cathedral of the Holy Spirit in Divinópolis
- Cathedral of Our Lady of the Conception in Dourados
- Cathedral of St. Anthony in Duque de Caxias
- Cathedral of St. Joseph in Erechim
- Cathedral of Our Lady of Guadalupe in Estância
- Cathedral of Our Lady Help of Christians in Eunápolis
- Metropolitan Cathedral of St. Ann in Feira de Santana
- Cathedral of the Good Jesus of the Afflicted in Floresta
- Cathedral of St. Peter of Alcantara in Floriano
- Metropolitan Cathedral of Our Lady of Exile in Florianópolis
- Cathedral of Our Lady of the Immaculate Conception in Formosa
- Metropolitan Cathedral of St. Joseph in Fortaleza
- Cathedral of St. John the Baptist in Foz do Iguaçu
- Cathedral of Our Lady of the Conception in Franca
- Cathedral of St. Anthony in Frederico Westphalen
- Cathedral of St. Anthony in Garanhuns
- Metropolitan Cathedral of Our Lady Help of Christians in Goiânia
- Cathedral of St. Ann in Goiás
- Cathedral of St. Anthony in Governador Valadares
- Cathedral of Our Lord of the Good End in Grajaú
- Catedral Nossa Senhora do Seringueiro in Guajará
- Cathedral of St. Michael in Guanhães
- Cathedral of Our Lady of Light in Guarabira
- Catedral Nossa Senhora de Belém in Guarapuava
- Cathedral of Our Lady of the Conception in Guarulhos
- Cathedral of Our Lady of the Dolours in Guaxupé
- Cathedral of St. John the Baptist in Guiratinga
- Cathedral of Our Lady of the Conception in Humaitá
- Cathedral of St. Ann in Iguatu
- Cathedral of St. Sebastian in Ilhéus
- Cathedral of Our Lady of Fatima in Imperatriz
- Cathedral of the Holy Spirit in Ipameri
- Cathedral of St. Dominic in Irecê
- Cathedral of Our Lady of the Rosary in Itabira
- Co-Cathedral of St. Sebastian in Coronel Fabriciano
- Cathedral of St. Joseph in Itabuna
- Prelatial Cathedral of Our Lady of the Rosary in Itacoatiara
- Cathedral of St. Francis Xavier in Itaguaí
- Prelatial Cathedral of St. Ann in Itaituba
- Catedral Nossa Senhora dos Prazeres in Itapetininga
- Cathedral of St. Ann in Itapeva
- Cathedral of Our Lady of Mercies in Itapipoca
- Cathedral of St. Joseph in Ituiutaba
- Cathedral of St. Rita of Cassia in Itumbiara
- Cathedral of Our Lady of Carmel in Jaboticabal
- Cathedral of Our Lady of the Conception and St. Sebastian in Jacarezinho
- Cathedral of Our Lady of the Assumption in Jales
- Cathedral of the Sacred Heart of Jesus in Janaúba
- Cathedral of Our Lady of the Dolours in Januária
- Cathedral of Our Lady of Fatima in Jardim
- Cathedral of the Holy Spirit in Jataí
- Cathedral of St. Anthony of Padua in Jequié
- Cathedral of St. John Bosco in Ji-Paraná
- Cathedral of St. Therese of the Child Jesus in Joaçaba
- Cathedral of St. Francis Xavier in Joinville
- Catedral Nossa Senhora das Grotas in Juazeiro
- Cathedral of the Sacred Heart of Jesus in Juína
- Metropolitan Cathedral of St. Anthony in Juiz de Fora
- Cathedral of Our Lady of Exile in Jundiaí
- Prelatial Cathedral of Our Lady of Nazareth in Lábrea
- Catedral Nossa Senhora dos Prazeres in Lages
- Cathedral of St. Sebastian in Leopoldina
- Cathedral of Our Lady of the Dolours in Limeira
- Cathedral of Our Lady of the Conception in Limoeiro do Norte
- Cathedral of St. Anthony in Lins
- Catedral Nossa Senhora do Livramento in Livramento de Nossa Senhora
- Metropolitan Cathedral of the Sacred Heart of Jesus in Londrina
- Cathedral of Our Lady of Mercy in Lorena
- Cathedral of Our Lady of Light in Luz
- Cathedral of Our Lady of Evangelization in Luziânia
- Cathedral of St. Joseph in Macapá
- Catedral Metropolitana Nossa Senhora dos Prazeres in Maceió
- Metropolitan Cathedral of Our Lady of the Conception in Manaus
- Cathedral of Our Lady of Perpetual Help in Marabá
- Cathedral of Our Lady of Consolation in Soure
- Metropolitan Cathedral-Basilica of Our Lady of Assumption in Mariana
- Cathedral-Basilica of St. Benedict in Marília
- Metropolitan Cathedral-Basilica of Our Lady of Glory in Maringá
- Cathedral of St. Therese of the Child Jesus in Miracema do Tocantins
- Cathedral of St. Ann in Mogi das Cruzes
- Cathedral of St. John the Baptist in Montenegro
- Metropolitan Cathedral of Our Lady of Apparition in Montes Claros
- Cathedral of St. Lucia in Mossoró
- Metropolitan Cathedral of Our Lady of the Presentation in Natal
- Our Lady of Fatima Cathedral, Naviraí
- Cathedral of Our Lady of the Conception in Nazaré da Mata
- Metropolitan Cathedral of St. John the Baptist in Niterói
- Cathedral of Our Lady of Lebanon in São Paulo (Maronite Rite)
- Melkite Cathedral of Our Lady in São Paulo (Melkite Greek)
- Cathedral of St. John the Baptist in Nova Friburgo
- Catedral Santo Antônio de Jacutinga in Nova Iguaçu
- Cathedral-Basilica of St. Louis Gonzaga in Novo Hamburgo
- Metropolitan Cathedral of St. Ann in Óbidos
- Cathedral of Our Lady of Victory in Oeiras
- Metropolitan Cathedral of Holy Saviour of the World in Olinda
- Co-Cathedral of St. Peter of Clerics in Recife
- Catedral Nossa Senhora de Oliveira in Oliveira
- Military Cathedral of St. Mary of the Military Queen of Peace in Brasília
- Cathedral of St. Anthony in Osasco
- Cathedral of Our Lady of the Conception in Osório
- Cathedral of the Good Lord Jesus in Ourinhos
- Catedral Nossa Senhora da Conceição dos Montes in Palmares
- Metropolitan Cathedral of St. Joseph in Palmas, Tocantins
- Catedral Senhor Bom Jesus da Coluna in Palmas, Paraná
- Co-Cathedral of Our Lady of Glory in Francisco Beltrão
- Catedral Nossa Senhora do Amparo in Palmeira dos Índios
- Cathedral of St. Anthony in Paracatu
- Metropolitan Cathedral-Basilica of Our Lady of the Snows in João Pessoa
- Cathedral of Our Lady of the Rosary in Paranaguá
- Prelatial Cathedral of St. Francis Xavier in Paranatinga
- Cathedral of Mary Mother of the Church in Paranavaí
- Cathedral of Our Lady of Carmel in Parintins
- Cathedral of Our Lady of Grace in Parnaíba
- Cathedral of Our Lady of Apparition in Passo Fundo
- Cathedral of Our Lady of Guidance in Patos
- Cathedral of St. Anthony of Padua in Patos de Minas
- Cathedral of Our Lady of Fatima in Paulo Afonso
- Cathedral of St. Francis of Paola in Pelotas
- Cathedral of Our Lady of the Rosary in Penedo
- Cathedral of St. Agueda in Pesqueira
- Cathedral of the Sacred Heart of Jesus Christ the King in Petrolina
- Cathedral of St. Peter of Alcantara in Petrópolis
- Catedral Nossa Senhora dos Remédios in Picos
- Cathedral of St. Ignatius of Loyola in Pinheiro
- Cathedral of St. Anthony in Piracicaba
- Cathedral of Our Lady of the Conception in Ponta de Pedras
- Cathedral of St. Ann in Ponta Grossa
- Metropolitan Cathedral of Our Lady Mother of God in Porto Alegre
- Cathedral of Our Lady of Mercies in Porto Nacional
- Metropolitan Cathedral of the Sacred Heart of Jesus in Porto Velho
- Metropolitan Cathedral of the Good Jesus in Pouso Alegre
- Cathedral of St. Sebastian in Presidente Prudente
- Cathedral of St. Anthony in Propriá
- Cathedral of Jesus, Mary and Joseph in Quixadá
- Cathedral of St. Francis Xavier in Registro
- Metropolitan Cathedral of St. Sebastian in Ribeirão Preto
- Cathedral of Our Lady of Nazareth in Rio Branco
- Cathedral of St. John the Baptist in Rio do Sul
- Cathedral of St. Peter in Rio Grande
- Cathedral of the Holy Cross in Rondonópolis
- Cathedral of Christ Redeemer in Boa Vista
- Cathedral of Our Lady of Glory in Rubiataba
- Co-Cathedral of Our Lady of Perpetual Help in Mozarlândia
- Cathedral of St. Anthony in Ruy Barbosa
- St. Anthony Cathedral in Salgueiro
- Cathedral of St. John the Baptist in Santa Cruz do Sul
- Cathedral of the Immaculate Conception in Santa Maria
- Cathedral of Our Lady of the Conception in Santarém
- Cathedral of Our Lady of the Conception in Conceição do Araguaia
- Catedral Santo Amaro in Santo Amaro
- Cathedral of Our Lady of Carmel in Santo André
- Cathedral of Guardian Angel in Santo Ângelo
- Cathedral of Our Lady of the Rosary in Santos
- Cathedral of St. Charles Borromeo in São Carlos
- Prelatial Cathedral of Our Lady of the Assumption in São Félix do Araguaia
- Cathedral of St. Gabriel in São Gabriel da Cachoeira
- Ukrainian Cathedral of St. John the Baptist in Curitiba (Ukrainian Rite)
- Cathedral of St. John the Baptist in São João da Boa Vista
- Cathedral-Basilica of Our Lady of the Pillar in São João del Rei
- Principal Church of the Immaculate Conception of Our Lady of the Rosary of Fatima in Campos dos Goytacazes
- Cathedral of St. Joseph in São José do Rio Preto
- Catedral de São Dimas in São José dos Campos
- Catedral de São José dos Pinhais in São José dos Pinhais
- Cathedral of St. Louis Gonzaga in São Luís de Montes Belos
- Metropolitan Cathedral of Our Lady of Victory in São Luís
- Cathedral of St. Louis of France in Cáceres
- Cathedral of St. Matthew in São Mateus
- Cathedral of St. Michael the Archangel in São Paulo
- Metropolitan Cathedral of Our Lady of the Assumption and St. Paul in São Paulo
- Cathedral of St. Raymond in São Raimundo Nonato
- Primatial Cathedral Basilica of the Transfiguration of the Lord in São Salvador da Bahia
- Metropolitan Cathedral of St. Sebastian in Rio de Janeiro
- Cathedral of St. Ann in Serrinha
- Cathedral of St. Anthony in Sete Lagoas
- Cathedral of St. Anthony in Sinop
- Cathedral of Our Lady of the Conception in Sobral
- Catedral Metropolitana Nossa Senhora da Ponte in Sorocaba
- Cathedral of St. Francis of Assisi in Taubaté
- Prelatial Cathedral of St. Teresa in Tefé
- Cathedral of St. Peter in Teixeira de Freitas
- Co-Cathedral of St. Anthony in Caravelas
- Cathedral of Our Lady of the Immaculate Conception in Teófilo Otoni
- Metropolitan Cathedral of Our Lady of Dolours in Teresina
- Cathedral of St. Ann in Tianguá
- Cathedral of Our Lady of Consolation in Tocantinópolis
- Cathedral of Christ the King in Toledo
- Cathedral of St. Anthony in Três Lagoas
- Cathedral of Our Lady of Mercy in Tubarão
- Metropolitan Cathedral of the Sacred Heart of Jesus in Uberaba
- Cathedral of St. Therese in Uberlândia
- Cathedral of the Holy Spirit in Umuarama
- Cathedral of the Sacred Heart of Jesus in União da Vitória
- Cathedral of St. Ann in Uruaçu
- Cathedral of St. Ann in Uruguaiana
- Catedral Nossa Senhora da Oliveira in Vacaria
- Cathedral of Our Lady of Glory in Valença
- Cathedral of Our Lady of the Conception in Viana
- Metropolitan Cathedral of Our Lady of Victory in Vitória
- Metropolitan Cathedral of Our Lady of the Victories in Vitória da Conquista
- Prelatial Cathedral of the Sacred Heart of Jesus in Altamira
- Cathedral of St. Anthony of Padua in Zé Doca

== Eastern Orthodox ==
Cathedrals of Eastern Orthodox Churches in Brazil:

- Metropolitan Orthodox Cathedral of St. Paul in São Paulo (Greek Orthodox Patriarchate of Antioch)
- Orthodox Cathedral of the Blessed Virgin Mary in Rio de Janeiro (Polish Orthodox)
- Catedral Ortodoxa Ucrâniana São Demétrio in Curitiba (Ukrainian Orthodox Church of USA)
- Catedral Ortodoxa da Santíssima Virgem Maria in Rio de Janeiro (Polish Orthodox Church)

== Anglican ==
Cathedral	City	State	Image	Notes
Holy Trinity Cathedral	Porto Alegre	Rio Grande do Sul		Consecrated on May 10, 1903
Cathedral of Santa Maria	Belém	Pará		Consecrated on November 30, 1912.
Cathedral of the Resurrection	Brasília	Distrito Federal		
St. James Cathedral	Curitiba	Paraná		
Cathedral of the Redeemer	Pelotas	Rio Grande do Sul		
Holy Trinity Cathedral	Recife	Pernambuco		Inaugurated on February 10, 1990.
St. Paul Cathedral	São Paulo	São Paulo		
Cathedral of the Mediator	Santa Maria	Rio Grande do Sul		
Cathedral of the Redeemer	Rio de Janeiro	Rio de Janeiro		

== See also ==
- List of cathedrals
