= St Anne's Cathedral =

St Anne's Cathedral or St. Ann's Cathedral may refer to:

== Brazil ==
- St. Ann Cathedral, Caicó, Rio Grande do Norte
- St. Ann Cathedral, Feira de Santana, Bahia
- St. Ann Cathedral, Mogi das Cruzes, São Paulo
- St. Ann Cathedral, Ponta Grossa, Paraná
- St. Ann Cathedral, Uruguaiana, Rio Grande do Sul

== Ivory Coast ==
- St. Ann Cathedral, Gagnoa

== United Kingdom ==
- St Anne's Cathedral, Leeds
- St Anne's Cathedral, Belfast

== United States ==
- St. Ann's Cathedral (Great Falls, Montana)
- St. Ann's Armenian Catholic Cathedral, New York, New York

== See also ==
- Church of St. Ann
