= Our Lady of Fatima Cathedral =

Our Lady of Fatima Cathedral may refer to:

- Our Lady of Fatima Cathedral, Benguela, Angola
- Our Lady of Fatima Cathedral, Cairo, Egypt
- Our Lady of Fatima Cathedral, Jardim, Brazil
- Our Lady of Fatima Cathedral, Kano, Nigeria
- Our Lady of Fatima Cathedral, Nampula, Mozambique
- Our Lady of Fatima Cathedral, Naviraí, Brazil
- Cathedral of Our Lady of Fatima, Karaganda, Kazakhstan

== See also ==
- Sanctuary of Fátima, Ourém, Portugal
- Our Lady of Fatima Church (disambiguation)
