= Our Lady of Fatima Church =

Our Lady of Fatima Church or variations may refer to:

== Central African Republic ==
- Church of Fatima, Bangui

== India ==
- Fatima Church, Kolkata
- Our Lady of Fatima Church, Kallukoottam, Kanyakumari, Tamil Nadu
- Our Lady of Fatima Church, Krishnagiri, Tamil Nadu

== Macau ==
- Our Lady of Fátima Church, Macau

== Hong Kong ==
- Our Lady of Fatima Church, Hong Kong

== Pakistan ==
- Our Lady of Fatima Church, Karachi

== Philippines ==
- National Shrine of Our Lady of Fatima, Valenzuela

== Portugal ==
- Sanctuary of Fátima, the basilica in Fátima

== United Kingdom ==
- Our Lady of Fatima Church, Harlow

== United States ==
- Basilica of The National Shrine of Our Lady of Fatima (Lewiston, New York)
- Our Lady of Fatima Roman Catholic Church, Queens, New York City, New York
- Our Lady of Fatima Church (Chinle, Arizona)

== See also ==
- Our Lady of Fatima Cathedral (disambiguation)
