= Arthur Mahon =

Reverend Arthur Mahon (1716–1788) was an Irish Anglican priest.

Reverend Arthur Mahon was born to the Very Revered Peter Mahon and his wife Catherine Gore in 1716 in Roscommon, Ireland. His father was Dean of Elphin from 1700 to 1739.

Mahon was educated at Trinity College, Dublin, setting him on the path for a theologic career. He held livings at Estersnow, Killuken, Kilcolagh, Tumna, and Creeve. He was appointed Archdeacon of Elphin in 1743.

On 16 July 1748, Mahon married Henrietta Downes, the daughter of Rt. Rev. Robert Downes at St. Anne’s Cathedral in Dublin.

He resigned in 1750 and assumed a role in the Prebendal Stall of Howth in St Patrick's Cathedral, Dublin.

Mahon died around February 1788, at the age of 72.
