= Peter Mahon =

Peter Mahon may refer to:

- Peter Mahon (politician) (1909–1980), British Labour Party Member of Parliament
- Peter Mahon (judge) (1923–1986), New Zealand barrister and judge
- Peter Mahon (priest), Dean of Elphin
