= Our Lady of Exile Cathedral, Jundiaí =

Our Lady of Exile Cathedral
- Catedral Nossa Senhora do Desterro
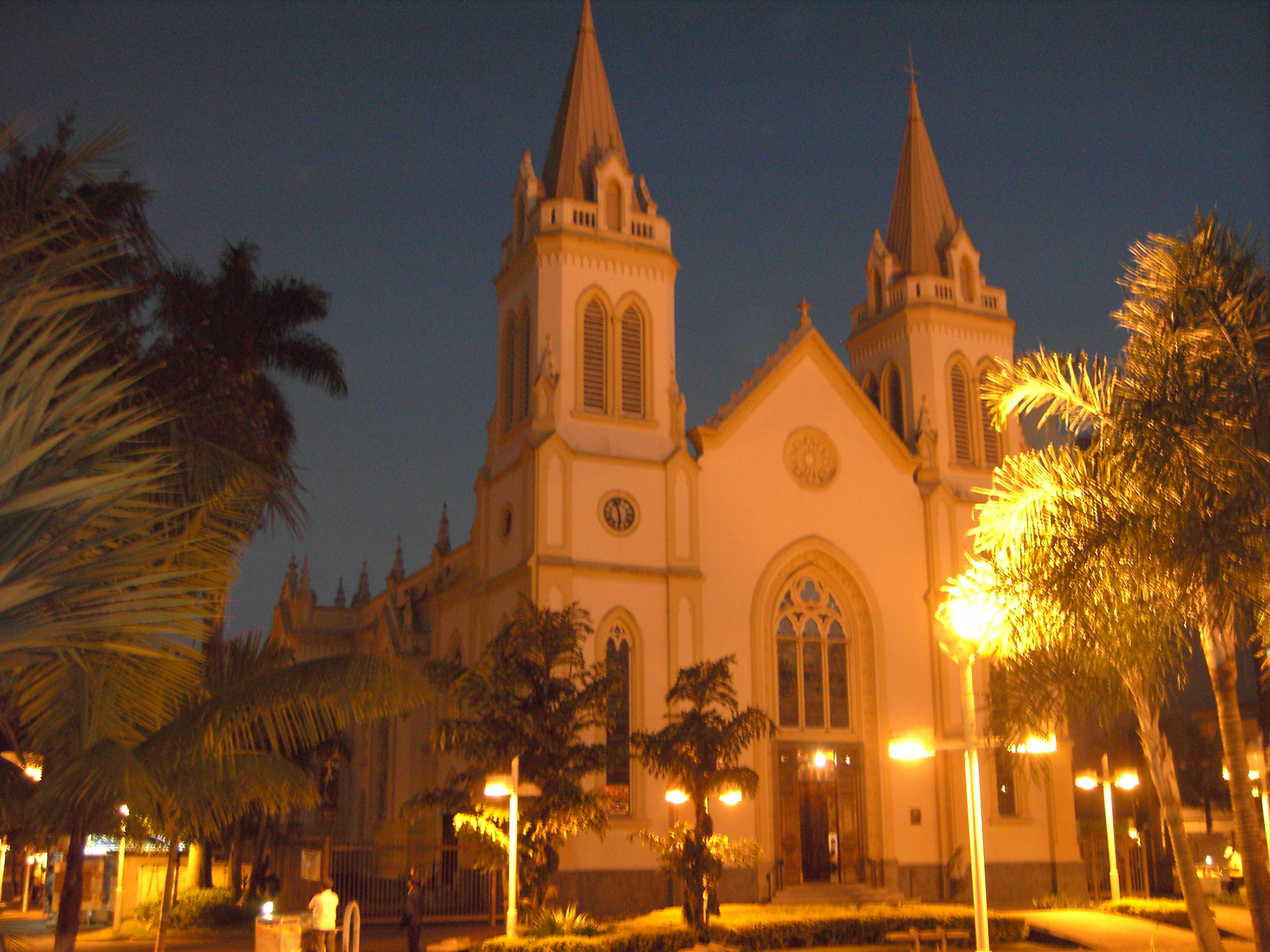
- Our Lady of Exile Cathedral
- 23°11′21″S 46°53′03″W
- Location: Jundiaí
- Country: Brazil
- Denomination: Roman Catholic Church

The Our Lady of Exile Cathedral (Portuguese: Catedral Nossa Senhora do Desterro) Also Jundiaí Cathedral It is a Catholic church that is located in Jundiaí, in São Paulo State, in the south of Brazil.

The first chapel dedicated to Our Lady of the Exile, built in 1651, marked the beginning of the recognition of the population of Jundiaí. Four years later, Jundiaí was elevated to the category of village. On March 28, 1865, the town was given the rank of city.

It was in 1921 that the vicar decided to transform the church into a neogothic style, replacing the old wooden cladding of the vaulted vaults, and the creation of the cruiser - with the expansion of two of the side chapels - was done and commissioned the interior decoration at Painter Arnaldo Mecozzi.

The diocese was created in Jundiaí on November 7, 1966, by Pope Paul VI. Through this act, the old church was elevated to the category of the Cathedral of the Diocese.

== See also ==
- Roman Catholicism in Brazil
- Our Lady of Exile

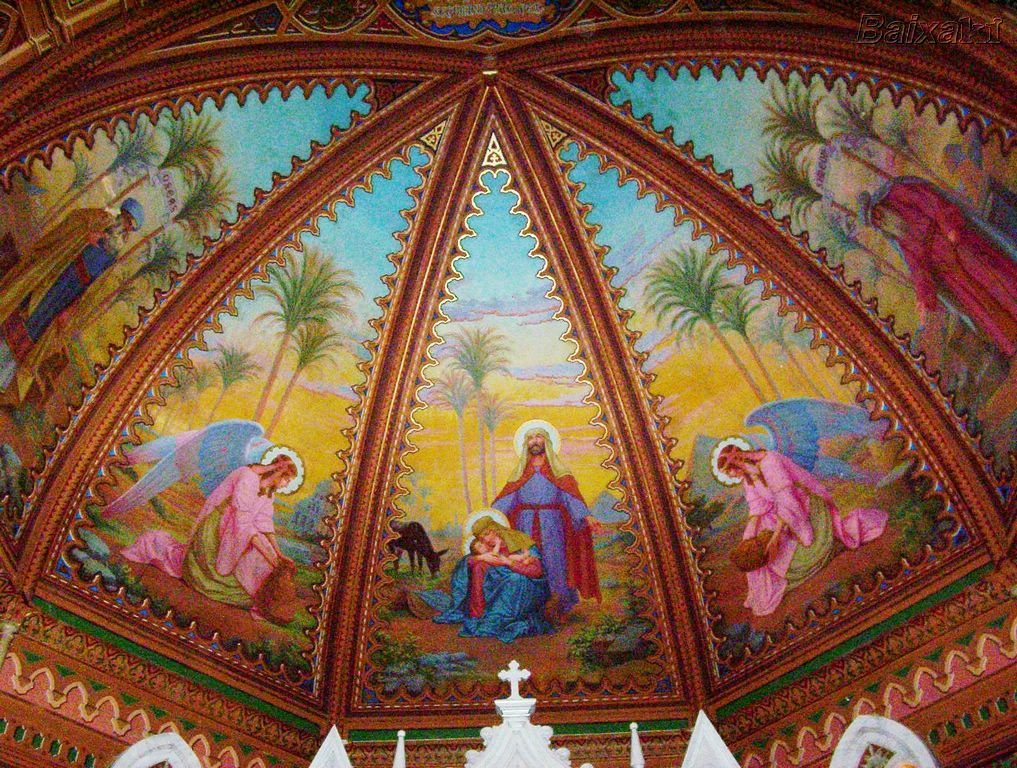
Internal view
