= Our Lady of Candelaria Cathedral, Corumbá =

Coordinates: 18.9989°S 57.6506°W

Our Lady of Candelaria Cathedral
- Catedral Nossa Senhora da Candelária
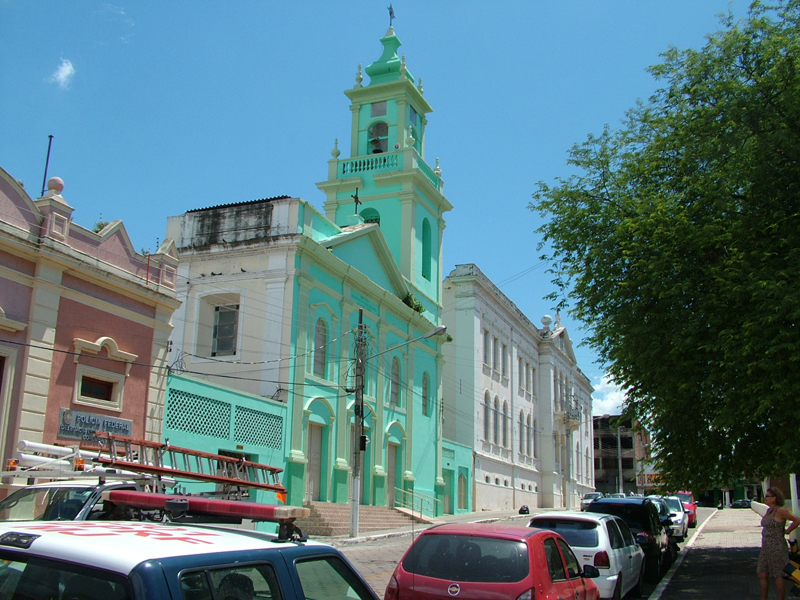
- Our Lady of Candelaria Cathedral
- Location: Corumbá
- Country: Brazil
- Denomination: Roman Catholic Church

Administration
- Diocese: Roman Catholic Diocese of Corumbá

The Our Lady of Candelaria Cathedral (Portuguese: Catedral Nossa Senhora da Candelária) Also Corumbá Cathedral Is a church located in the center of Corumbá, state of Mato Grosso do Sul, in the South American country of Brazil. It is the place where the patron saint of the city (Nossa Senhora da Candelária) is housed. A shield of the Portuguese crown is on its altar.

It was built in 1885 by the imperial preacher and Vicar of Vara, Friar Mariano Bagnaia. The church, according to some historians, was the subject of a great controversy at the moment because Frei, believing hero of the War against Paraguay, and to have survived the torture imposed by the Paraguayans, decided to build the church in his honor. The bishop did not agree and the legend says, Mariano would have thrown a curse, the curse of the city will be stagnation and poverty for 100 years until the sandals of Mariano, buried in an unknown place were discovered. Coincidence or not, some relate that made the city suffer economic stagnation from the end of river trade with this event. The church was inaugurated in 1887, with the solemnity of the Roman Rite.

== See also ==
- Roman Catholicism in Brazil
- List of cathedrals in Brazil
- Our Lady of Candelaria
