= Our Lady of Glory Cathedral, Valença =

Coordinates: 22.2461°S 43.7010°W

Our Lady of Glory Cathedral
- Catedral Nossa Senhora da Glória
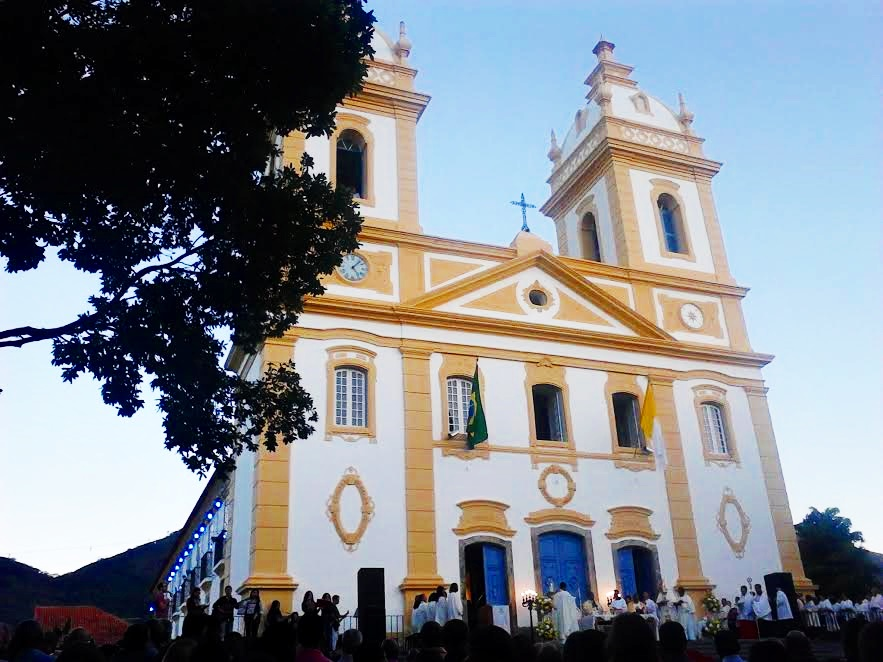
- Our Lady of Glory Cathedral
- Location: Valença
- Country: Brazil
- Denomination: Roman Catholic Church

The Our Lady of Glory Cathedral (Portuguese: Catedral Nossa Senhora da Glória) Also Valença Cathedral Is the name given to a religious building that is part of the Catholic Church and is located in the center of the city of Valença in the state of Rio de Janeiro in the southern part of the South American country of Brazil.

The current church was built in 1820 and between 1917 and 1970 it went through a period in which it was extensively restored. It is the main church of the bishop of the diocese of Valença and houses the Padre Manoel Gomes Leal Museum. It is also one of the main tourist attractions of the city.

Is under the pastoral responsibility of Bishop Nelson Francelino Ferreira.

== See also ==
- Roman Catholicism in Brazil
