= Our Lady of Fatima Church, Kallukoottam =

R.C. Church, Kallukoottam
- கல்லுக்கூட்டம் தூய பாத்திமா அன்னை ஆலயம்
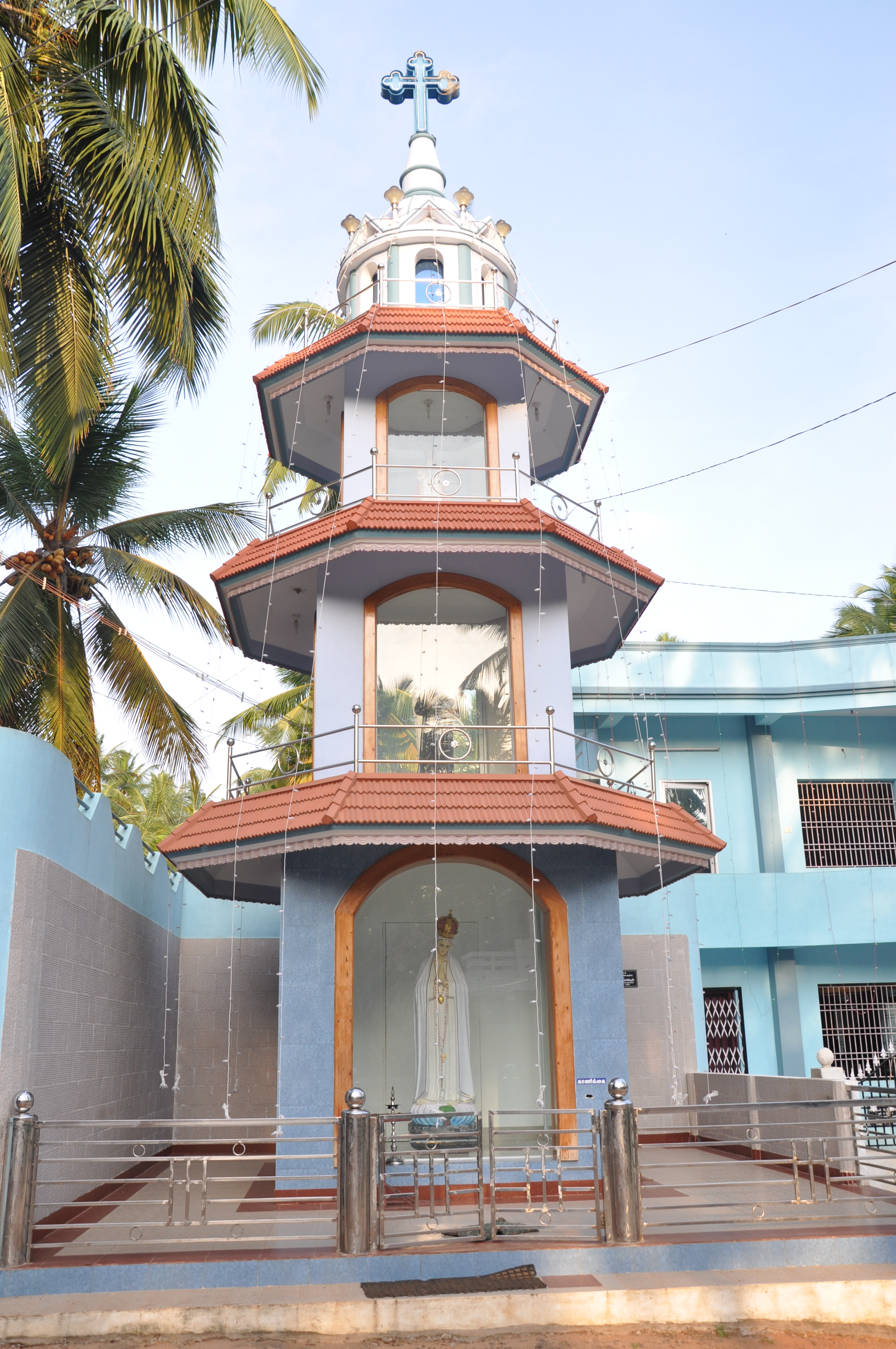

- Location within Tamil Nadu
- 8.1135°N 77.1719°E
- Location: Tamil Nadu
- Country: India
- Denomination: Catholic
- Website: Kallukoottam R.C. Church, Tamil Wiki Page

History
- Status: Parish Church
- Founded: 1952

Specifications
- Capacity: 500

Administration
- District: Kanyakumari
- Archdiocese: Madurai
- Diocese: Kuzhithurai
- Parish: Kallukoottam

Clergy
- Archbishop: Anthony Pappusamy
- Bishop: Jerome Dhas Varuvel, SDB
- Priest: Fr Sunil K.

Our Lady of Fatima Church, Kallukoottam (also known as Kallukoottam R.C. Church), is a place of worship for the Catholic Christians living in the town panchayat of Kallukootam. It is an active Catholic parish church in the vicariate of Karankadu of the Roman Catholic Diocese of Kuzhithurai.

== History ==
Our Lady of Fatima Church, Kallukoottam, traces its humble origin as a Bhajan Kurusady (a thatched shed for carols during Christmas) in 1951. After a decade of coming together to exercise their simple faith, the community of 18 families, under the leadership of Mr Anthony Muthu, was raised to the status of substation of St. Francis Xavier Parish, Mankuzhi, in 1960. From then on the Eucharistic celebration for wedding and funeral was conducted. To bring the children up in the Catholic faith, rudimentary catechism classes were organised on one of the week days. The Eucharistic celebration at Christmas and Easter was introduced from 1963.

The administration of the substation of Our Lady of Fatima Church was shifted to St. Francis Xavier Parish, Konamkadu, in 1964. With the new administration, it gained the status of substation with Sunday Masses. To cater to the spiritual development of the adults, the Christian Life community for women and for men were started respectively in the years 1965 and 1978. In order to help the sick and the poor, the St. Vincent De Paul Society was started in 1979. As part of spiritual reformation, Basic ecclesial communities (anbiyangal) were introduced in the substation in 1994. There was no practice of individual tax in the church until 1988 but then the majority of the people felt the need of paying an affordable tax, agreed by the faithful, for the maintenance and upkeep of the church. Over the years the physical structure of the church too got transformed from a simple thatched house to a concrete church that could accommodate about 400 parishioners. In 2008, the substation of Our Lady of Fatima Church, Kallukoottam, was raised to the status of an independent parish and Fr Mariadasan was appointed as the first parish priest of the newly formed parish. Under the leadership of Fr Andrews, the second parish priest of the parish, a community hall and a new presbytery were constructed in the years 2013 and 2014 respectively. From 23 May 2018 Fr. Jokens is serving as the parish priest of this parish. Every Last Friday of the month charismatic prayer service with Adoration to the Blessed Sacrament is conducted. Now, Kolping Society is promoting natural home garden where vegetables are cultivated without any chemical manure, which is flourishing. Many families participate in the event.
