= St. Sebastian Cathedral, Ilhéus =

St. Sebastian Cathedral
- Catedral São Sebastião
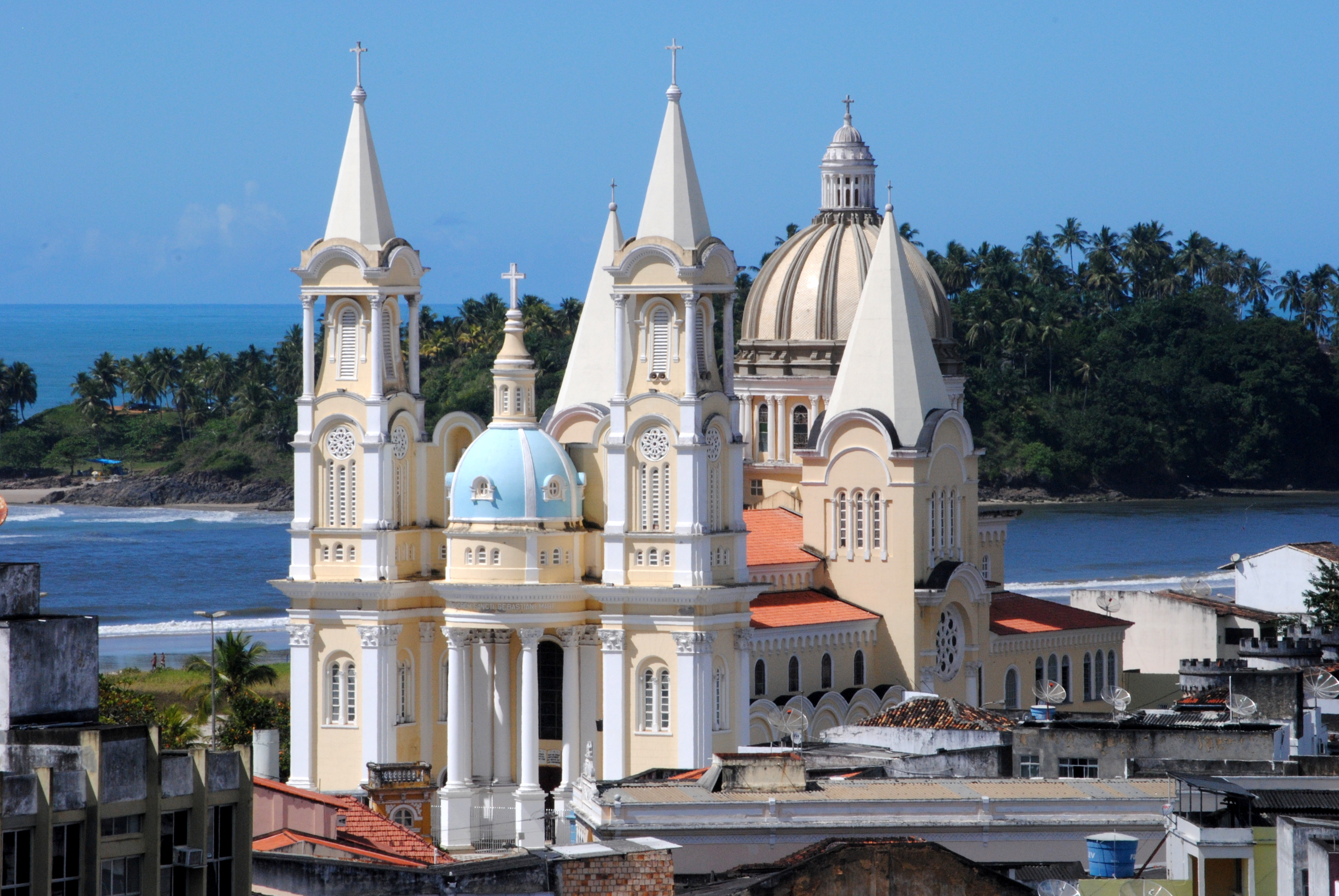
- St. Sebastian Cathedral
- Location: Ilhéus
- Country: Brazil
- Denomination: Roman Catholic Church

The Cathedral of St. Sebastian (Portuguese: Catedral São Sebastião), also called Ilhéus Cathedral, located in the historic center of Ilhéus, Bahia in Brazil, is the Roman Catholic cathedral of the Diocese of Ilhéus. It is under the pastoral responsibility of bishop Mauro Montagnoli.

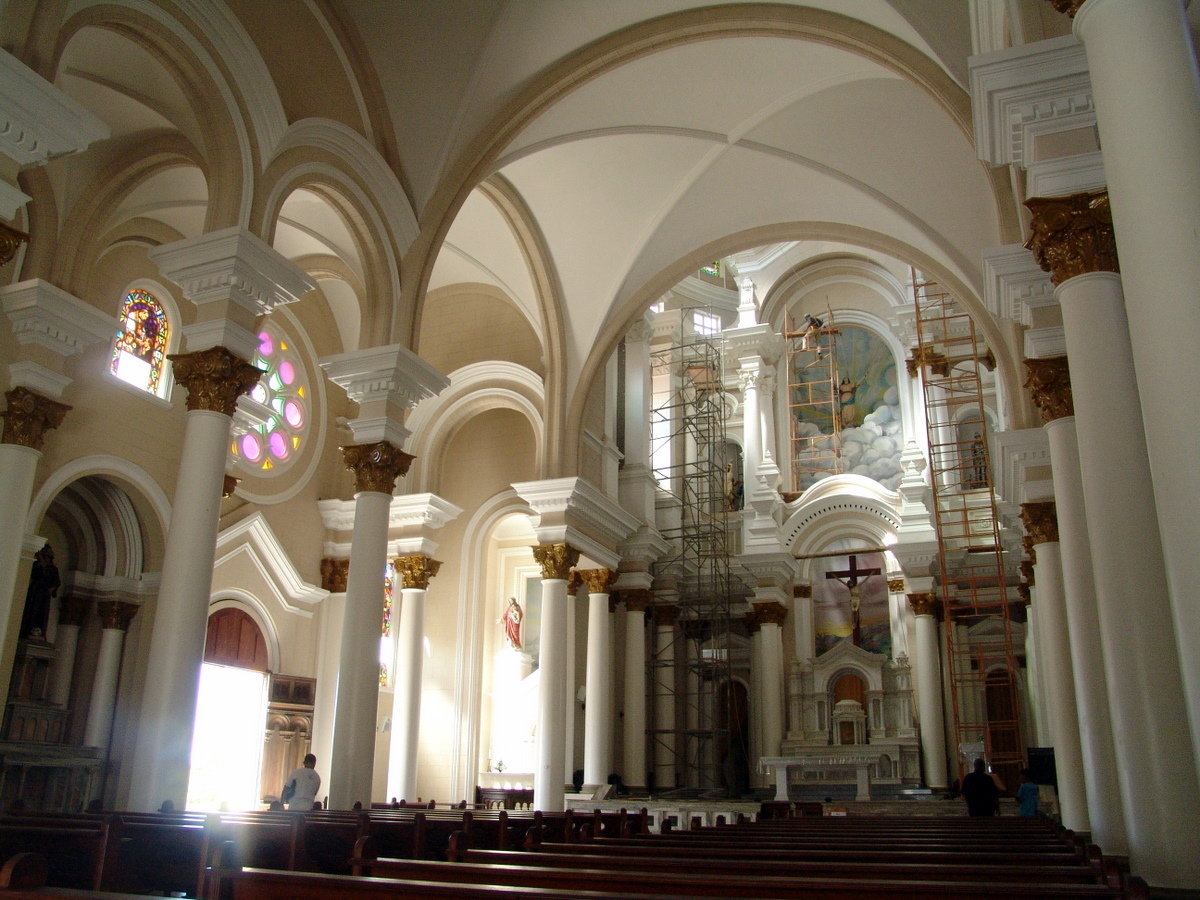
Internal view

The cathedral was built in the neoclassical style., the structure is one of the key tourist attractions in town. It has a dome that reaches 47 meters in height, which took another 30 years to be built, finally inaugurated in 1967.

It has served as the mother church for the diocese since its erection in 1913 by Pope Pius X with the bull "Majus animarum bonum."

== See also ==
- Roman Catholicism in Brazil
- St. Sebastian
