= Cathedral Basilica of St. Louis Gonzaga =

Church in Novo Hamburgo, Brazil

Coordinates: 29°41′04″S 51°07′57″W

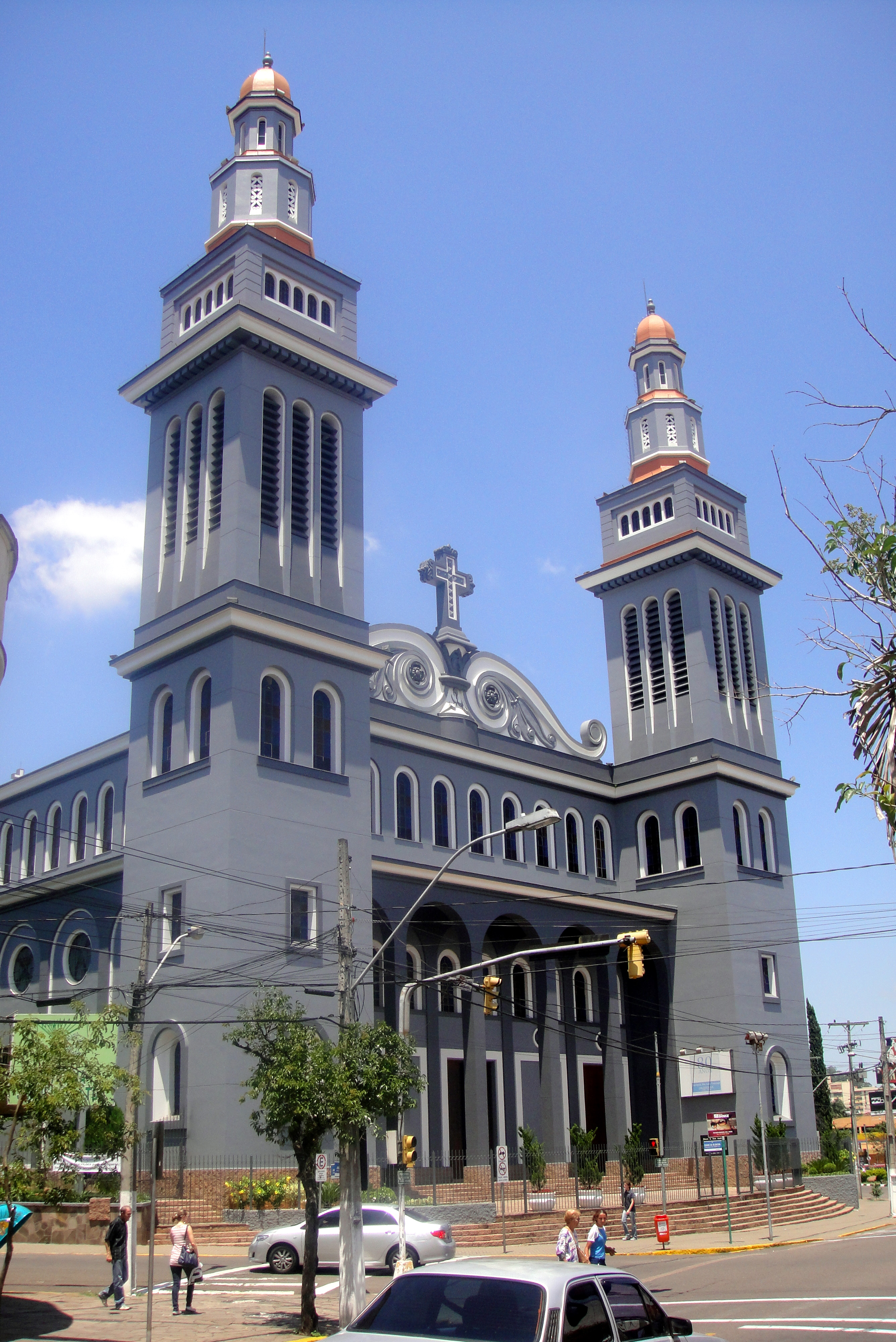
Cathedral Basilica of St. Louis Gonzaga

The Cathedral Basilica of St. Louis Gonzaga is the main church in the city of Novo Hamburgo, Rio Grande do Sul.

The foundation of the future Church was started on January 7, 1924, after purchasing land with 9.650m ², where it is today the Cathedral Basilica of St. Louis Gonzaga. The new church was planned to be built with three naves, and average lengths of 25m by 18m wide by Architect Jose Lutzenberger, and the works were sponsored by the Construction Breidenbach Mosmann & Cia.

On June 6, 1952, Archbishop Dom Vicente Scherer, Porto Alegre, gave the blessing the new Matrix. It was covered part of the building in July 1953. On March 21, 1954, inaugurated a part of the Matrix and the next day the chapel was demolished in 1924 (his material was sent to build a parish in the district Rondônia, called Lady. Of Thanks). In 1956 it was destroyed the dividing wall and placed the majestic scale of the new Temple. In the same year was installed tubular organ "Bohn" (currently valued at U.S. $133,000).

In 1959 was contracted Italian painter Aldo Locatelli to make the sacred paintings of São Luiz Gonzaga, patron of St. Louis Parish and that today one can see in the presbytery of this church. With the creation of the Diocese of Novo Hamburgo on March 30, 1980, was elevated to Cathedral São Luiz Gonzaga. The cathedral was consecrated only on October 12, 1991. It became Cathedral Dedicated and from this date earned the title of Cathedral Basilica St. Louis Gonzaga. Between 1994 and 1995 a major restoration was done with external lighting towers and side (78 Installed spotlights sodium).
