= St. Ann Cathedral, Caicó =

St. Ann Cathedral
- Catedral Sant'Ana
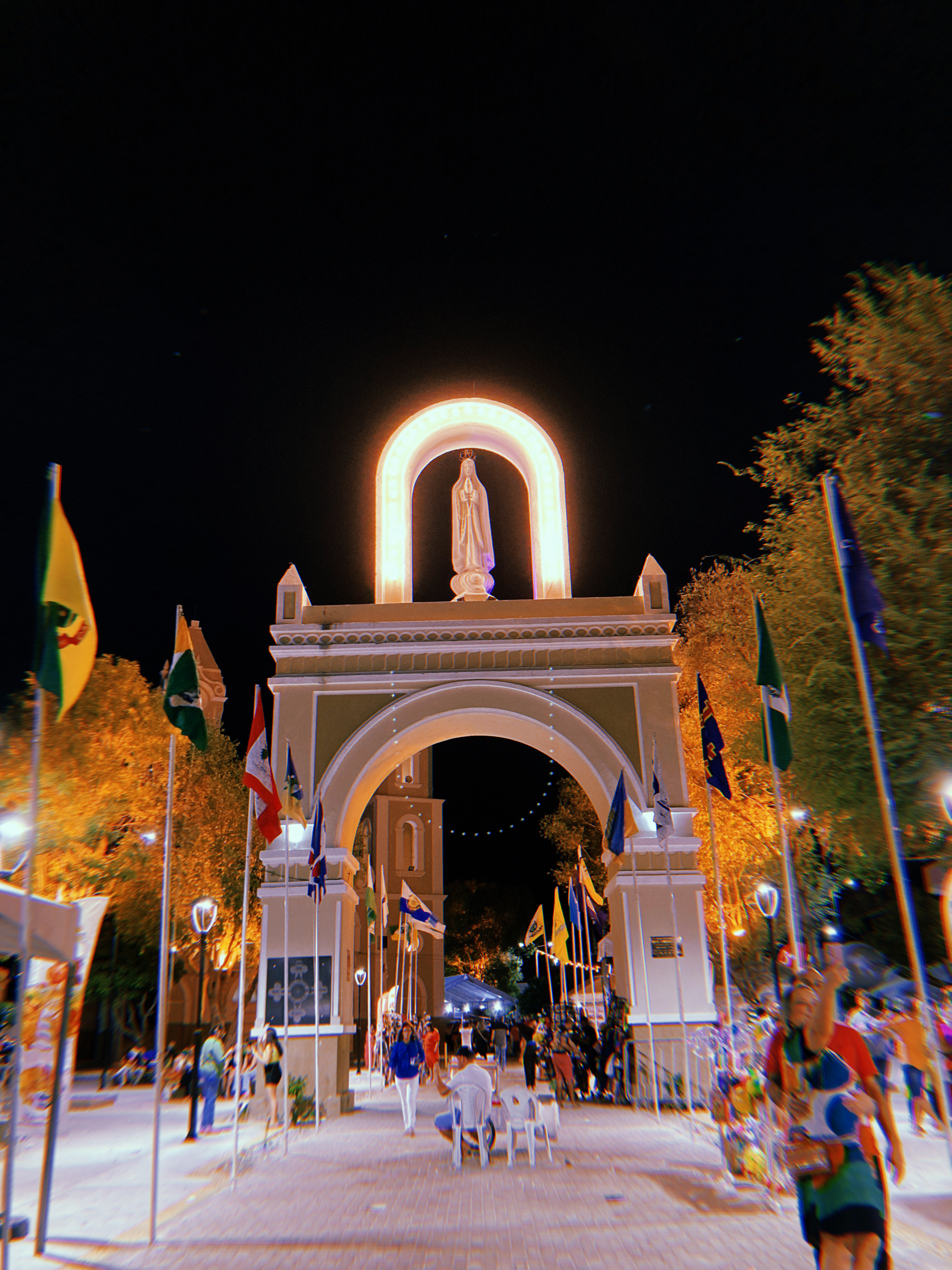
- The square and arch of triumph dedicated to the Virgin of Fatima in front of the cathedral
- St. Ann Cathedral
- 6.45814°S 37.09293°W
- Location: Caicó
- Country: Brazil
- Denomination: Roman Catholic Church

Architecture
- Years built: 1748–1785

Administration
- Diocese: Roman Catholic Diocese of Caicó

The St. Ann Cathedral (also Caicó Cathedral; Portuguese: Catedral Sant’Ana) is a Catholic church located in the Monseñor Walfredo Gurgel Square in the center of the city of Caicó, Rio Grande do Norte State, in southern Brazil. The cathedral is the seat of the bishop of the Diocese of Caicó and also the seat of the parish of Sant'Ana. Its construction began symbolically on July 16, 1748, when the parish of Santa Ana was installed. Its benefactor was Manoel Fernandes Jorge, and its first vicar Fr. Francisco Alves Maia.

The cathedral of Santa Ana has a harmonious combination of Romanesque, Gothic and colonial styles. The temple features a curvilinear frontispiece flanked by two bell towers. It has a central door. In the choir are three windows protected by iron. Its interior consists of a chancel, naves, choir and baptismal font.

By 1785 the Mother Church of Sant'Ana was built and the faithful could attend religious events. Its conclusion would take place during the administration of the parish priest Francisco de Brito Guerra (1802–1845).

== See also ==
- Roman Catholicism in Brazil
- St. Ann Cathedral
