= Our Lady of Carmel Cathedral, Jaboticabal =

Coordinates: 21.25735°S 48.31731°W

Our Lady of Carmel Cathedral
- Catedral Nossa Senhora do Carmo
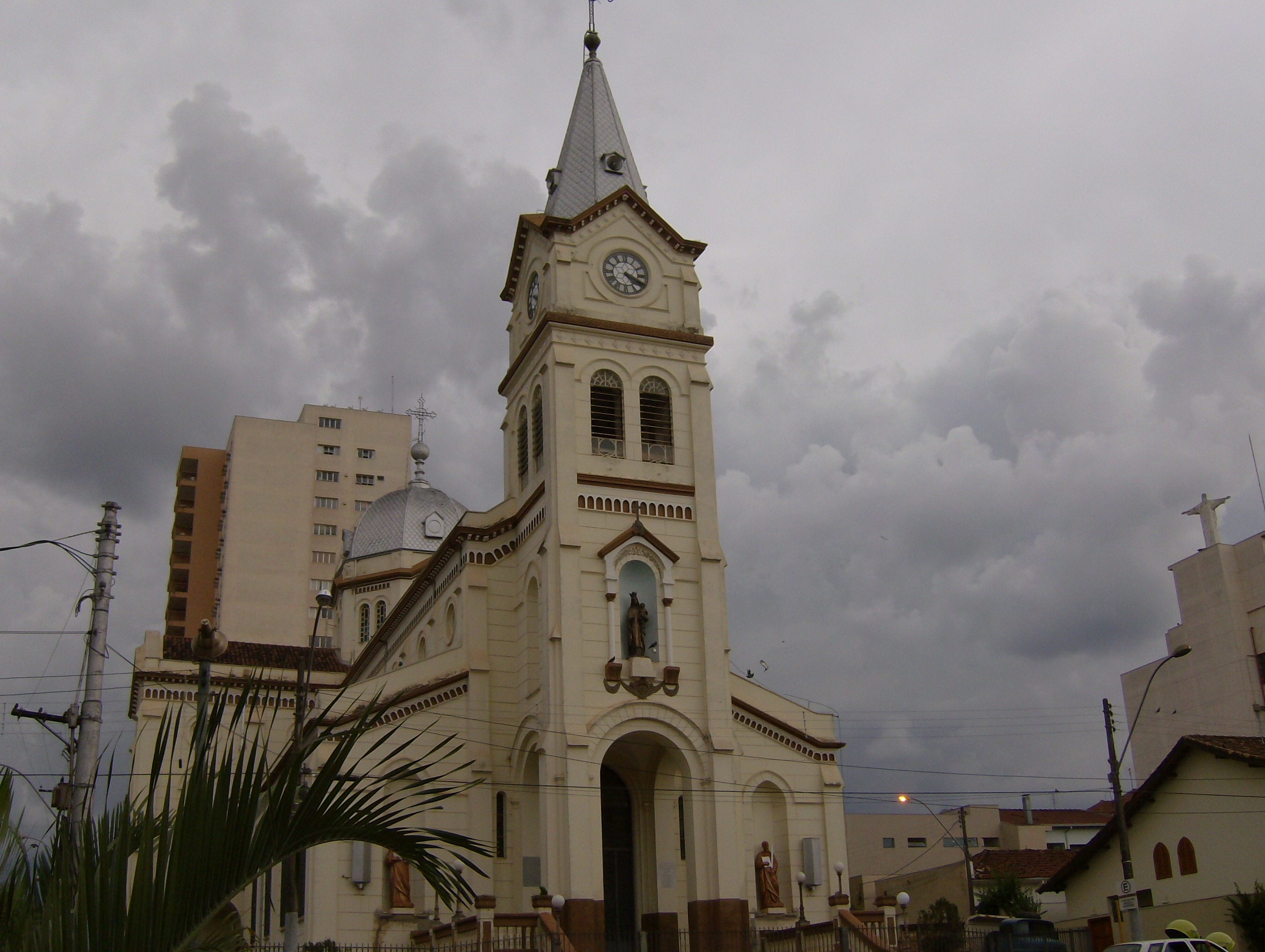
- Our Lady of Carmel Cathedral
- Location: Jaboticabal
- Country: Brazil
- Denomination: Roman Catholic Church

The Our Lady of Carmel Cathedral (Portuguese: Catedral Nossa Senhora do Carmo) Also Jaboticabal Cathedral Is located in Joaquim Batista Square, in Jaboticabal, Sao Paulo State in southern Brazil. It is a temple of the Catholic Church, the seat of the diocese of Jaboticabal and is considered the zero zone of the city. It is dedicated to the Virgin of Mount Carmel, patron saint of Jaboticabal.

The old church of Our Lady of the Carmel was inaugurated in 1828, being in this chapel that the founder of the city of João Pinto Ferreira, donated its inheritance to Our Lady of the Carmen and thus was founded the city of Jaboticabal. It was demolished around 1926, when the new headquarters was practically ready.

The new temple was built where was the residence of Mr. Claudio Vaz de Arruda, first as a parish church, later, in 1929, was elevated to the Cathedral of the diocese. The first two bishops of Jaboticabal, Don Antonio Augusto de Assis (December 5, 1863 - February 7, 1961) and Don Jose Varani (October 4, 1915 - June 24, 1990) are buried there.

== See also ==
- Roman Catholicism in Brazil
- Our Lady of Carmel

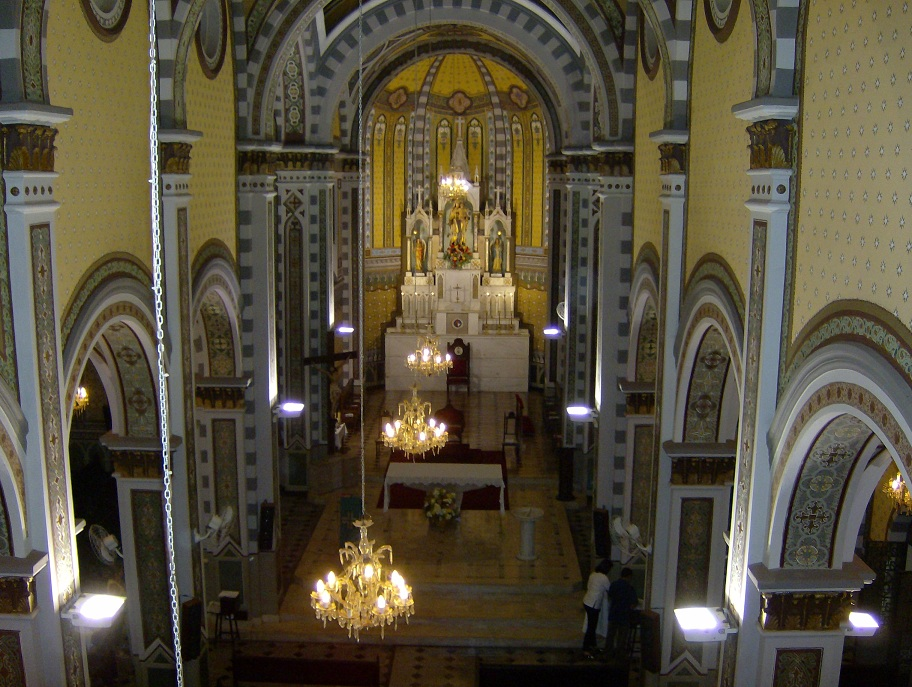
Another View
