= St. Therese Cathedral, Bacabal =

St. Therese Cathedral
- Catedral Santa Terezinha
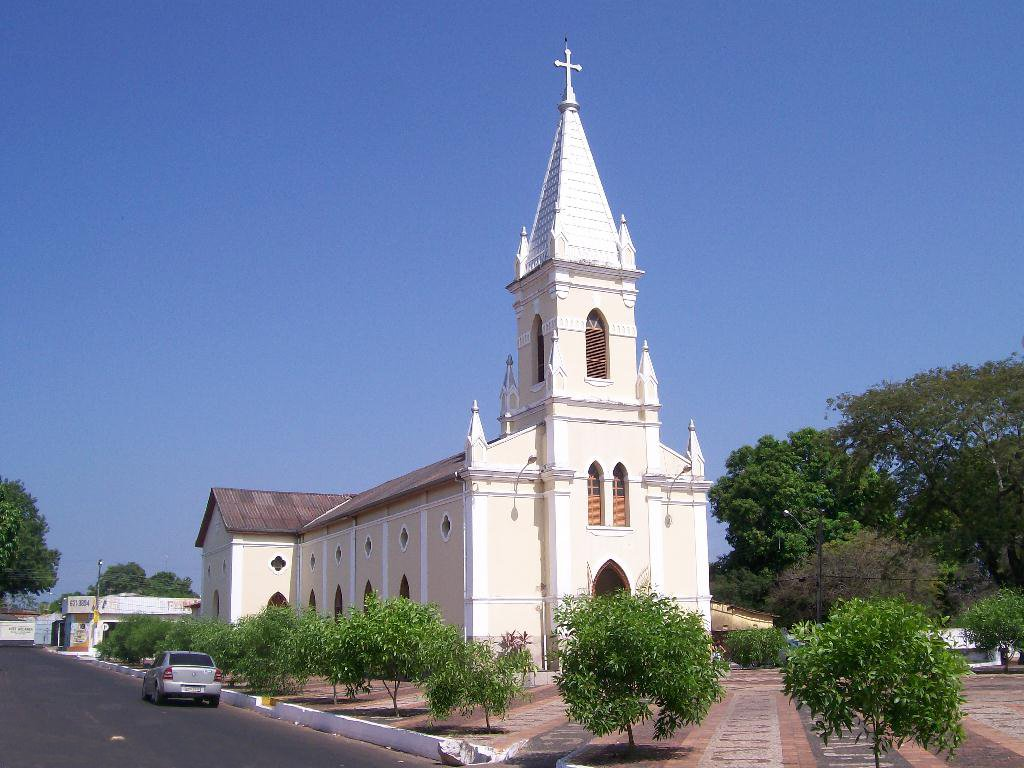
- St. Therese Cathedral
- 4.22801°S 44.77539°W
- Location: Bacabal
- Country: Brazil
- Denomination: Roman Catholic Church

The St. Therese Cathedral (Portuguese: Catedral Santa Terezinha) also known as Bacabal Cathedral is a Catholic cathedral constructed in neogothic style located in Praça da Sé (Seat Square) in the city of Bacabal a municipality in the state of Maranhão, in the north of the South American country of Brazil.

The temple follows the Roman or Latin rite and is the mother or main church of the Catholic Diocese of Bacabal (Dioecesis Bacabalensis) that was created in 1968 through the bull "Visibilis natura" of Pope Paul VI.

It is under the pastoral responsibility of Bishop Armando Martín Gutiérrez. The church was dedicated to St. Theresa of Lisieux also known as St. Therese and was a Carmelite nun barefoot of France declared holy by the Pope in 1925.

== See also ==
- Roman Catholicism in Brazil
- St. Therese of Lisieux
