= Peter Mahon (priest) =

18th-century Irish Anglican priest

Ver. Rev. Peter Mahon (d. 1739) was an Irish Anglican priest.

Mahon was educated at Trinity College, Dublin. He held livings at Killuken and Tumna. He was appointed Archdeacon of Elphin in 1683 and Dean in 1700.

Mahon married Catherine Gore sometime before 1716, and together they had three children: Arthur, Magdalene, and Catherine.

He died in 1739.
