= Our Lady of Bethlehem Cathedral, Guarapuava =

Coordinates: 25.39385°S 51.46513°W

Our Lady of Bethlehem Cathedral
- Catedral Nossa Senhora de Belém
- Our Lady of Bethlehem Cathedral
- Location: Guarapuava
- Country: Brazil
- Denomination: Roman Catholic Church

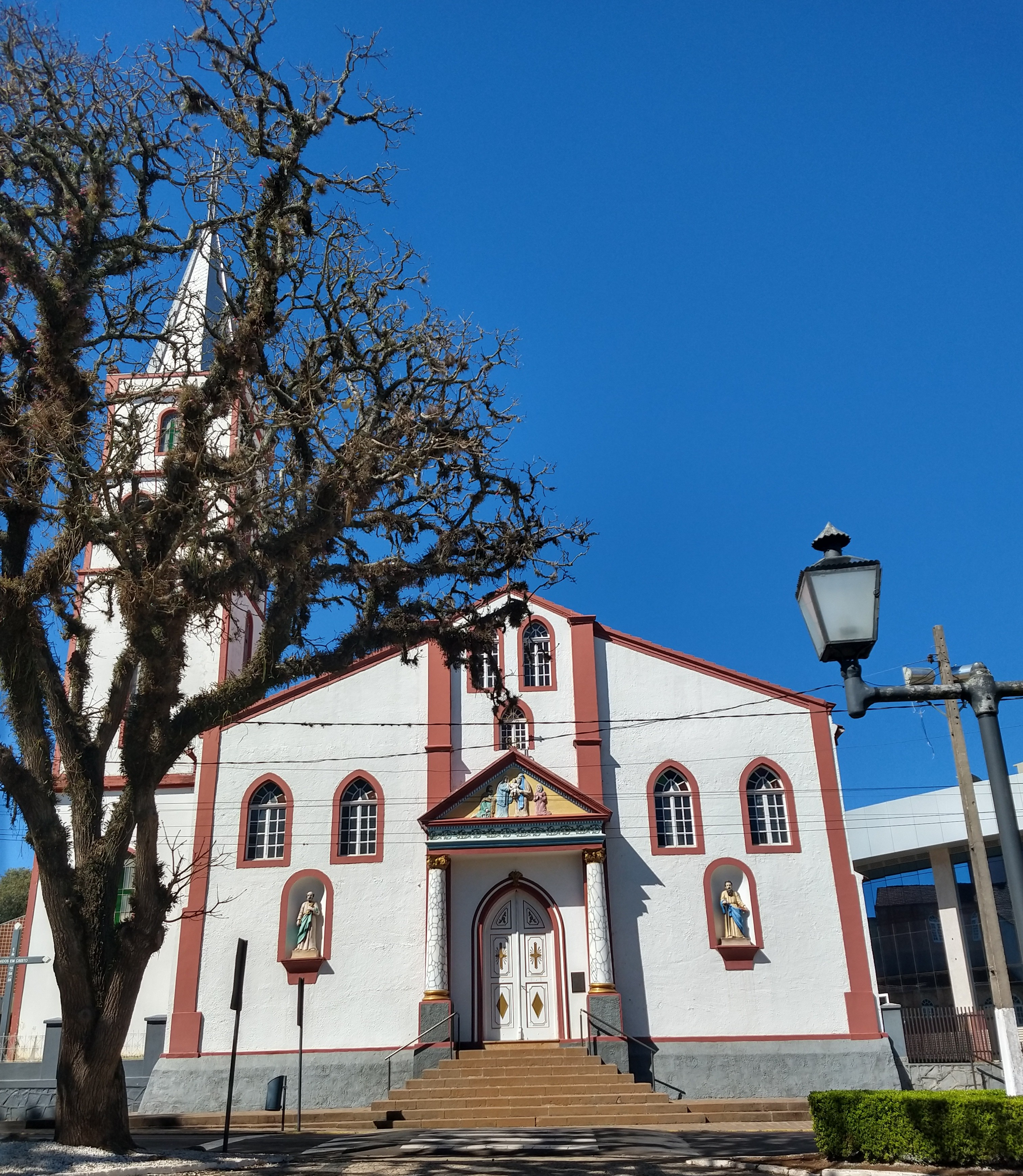
Fachada Catedral Nossa Senhora de Belém.jpg

The Our Lady of Bethlehem Cathedral (Portuguese: Catedral Nossa Senhora de Belém), also known as Guarapuava Cathedral, is a historical Catholic cathedral located in Guarapuava, Paraná state, Brazil.

It is the headquarters of the Catholic Diocese of Guarapuava (Dioecesis Guarapuavensis or Diocese de Guarapuava) in the ecclesiastical province of Curitiba. The diocese was created in 1965 through the bull "Christi vices" of Pope Paul VI.

== See also ==
- Roman Catholicism in Brazil
- Our Lady of Bethlehem
