= St. Anthony Cathedral, Salgueiro =

St. Anthony Cathedral
- Catedral de Santo Antônio
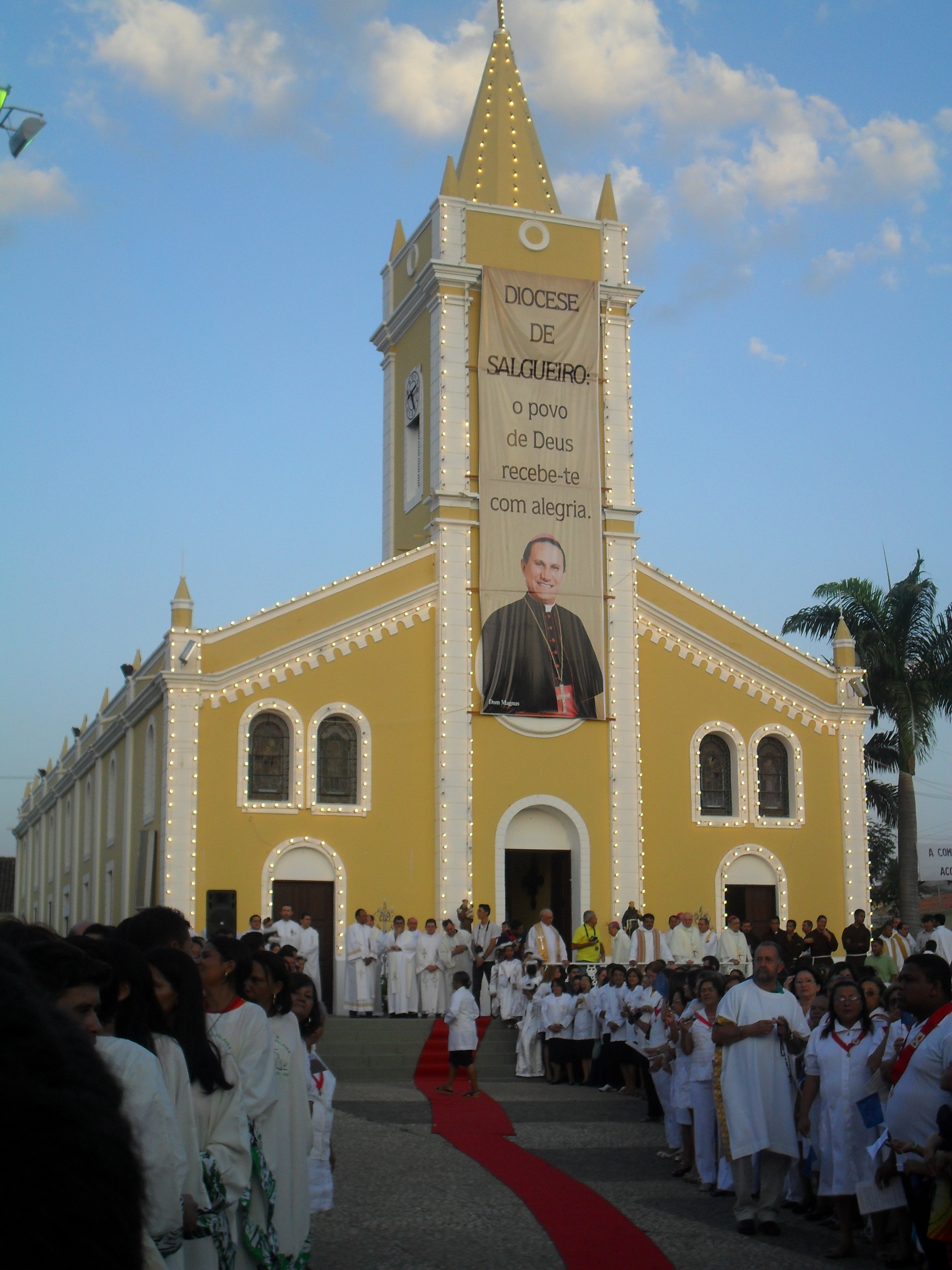
- St. Anthony Cathedral
- 8.0743°S 39.1191°W
- Location: Salgueiro
- Country: Brazil
- Denomination: Roman Catholic Church

Architecture
- Style: Gothic Revival

The Cathedral of Saint Anthony (Portuguese: Catedral de Santo Antônio), or simply the Salgueiro Cathedral, is a Roman Catholic church located in Salgueiro, Pernambuco, Brazil. Since October 12, 2010, is the cathedral of the Roman Catholic Diocese of Salgueiro.

The church was established with the city in 1835. A story about its foundation relates that the child Raimundo de Sá was lost when he was only three years old. After several searches, his mother promised Saint Anthony to build a chapel if the child was found safe and sound. A chapel was constructed where the child was found, completed around 1838. The news of the incident spread, the church became a pilgrimage site.

== See also ==
- Catholic Church in Brazil
