= St. Joseph's Cathedral, Ituiutaba =

Coordinates: 18.9691°S 49.4642°W

St. Joseph's Cathedral
- Catedral São José
- St. Joseph's Cathedral
- Location: Ituiutaba
- Country: Brazil
- Denomination: Roman Catholic Church

The Cathedral of Saint Joseph (Portuguese: Catedral São José) or simply Ituiutaba Cathedral is a parish of the Roman Catholic Church in Ituiutaba, Minas Gerais, Brazil. Consecrated to Saint Joseph, it is the episcopal seat of the Roman Catholic Diocese of Ituiutaba.

Settlement of the area began around 1820. In 1832, Fr. Antonio Dias Gouveia established a chapel, around which the city grew. The municipality, originally named Arraial de São José do Tijuco, was created in 1839, but a separate parish was only established November 7, 1866, through Provincial Law 472. A new church was completed in 1862.

In November 1938, the church of San José was destroyed by a fire in which the furniture, the Tabernacle, clothes and images were lost. The ruins that remained of the fire were demolished in 1939, when the first stone of the present structure was placed on March 19, the Feast of Saint Joseph. Construction was completed in 1959.

The parish was elevated to cathedral status with the erection of the Diocese of Ituiutaba on October 16, 1982.

== See also ==
- Catholic Church in Brazil
