= St. Ann Cathedral, Uruguaiana =

Coordinates: 29.7574°S 57.0872°W

St. Ann Cathedral
- Catedral de Sant'Ana
- St. Ann Cathedral
- Location: Uruguaiana
- Country: Brazil
- Denomination: Roman Catholic Church

Architecture
- Years built: 1861–1874; 1926–1959

Administration
- Diocese: Roman Catholic Diocese of Uruguaiana

St. Ann Cathedral (also called Uruguaiana Cathedral; Portuguese: Catedral de Sant'Ana) is a Catholic church that originated as the parish of Santana, created by Provincial Law 58 of May 29, 1846, together with the city of Uruguaiana, Brazil, and was built between 1861 and 1874.

In 1906, the parish was partially destroyed by a major fire, but was restored in the following years.

With the creation of the Diocese of Uruguaiana, on August 15, 1910, by the bull Praedecessorum Nostrorum by Pope Pius X, the parish became the Sant'ana Cathedral.

Later, in 1926, it was demolished since there was already a project for the construction of a bigger building, which was under construction; it was finished in 1959. It took 33 years to complete.

== See also ==
- Roman Catholicism in Brazil
- St. Ann Cathedral
