= St. Anthony of Padua Cathedral, Patos de Minas =

Coordinates: 18.58846°S 46.51711°W

St. Anthony of Padua Cathedral
- Catedral Santo Antônio de Pádua
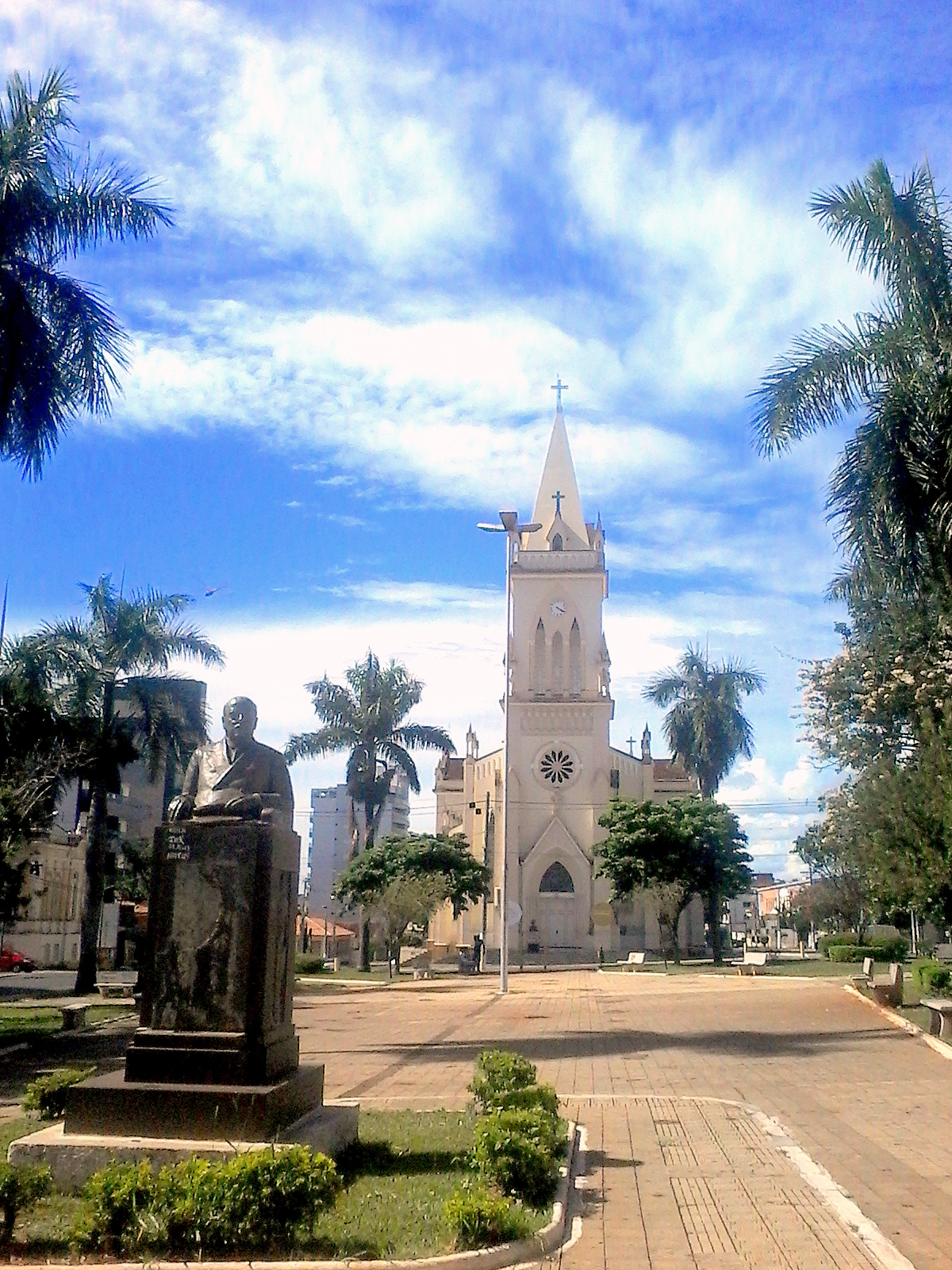
- St. Anthony of Padua Cathedral
- Location: Patos de Minas
- Country: Brazil
- Denomination: Roman Catholic Church

The St. Anthony of Padua Cathedral (Portuguese: Catedral Santo Antônio de Pádua) Also Patos de Minas Cathedral It is a Catholic church located in Patos de Minas, in the state of Minas Gerais in the South American country of Brazil. Dedicated to St. Anthony of Padua, it is the episcopal seat of the Catholic diocese of Patos de Minas.

The Parish of Santo Antonio was established in Patos de Minas on May 31, 1850, through Provincial Law 472. In the place where today the Memorial of Patos de Minas, there was a chapel that was built in 1839. The old chapel Was remodeled in 1875, but the space was insufficient to accommodate the faithful. The idea of constructing a new parochial church appeared in 1892 and a committee for this purpose was established in 1917 by Canon Getulio Alves de Melo. The first stone of the present temple, however, was only put on June 13, 1934. The construction was completed and the church opened to the public on June 13, 1954.

Since the creation of the Catholic diocese of Patos de Minas, on April 5, 1955, the parish became a cathedral, which was solemnly consecrated on October 28, 1961 by the then archbishop of Brasilia, the priest José Newton de Almeida. The old chapel was demolished only in 1965.

== See also ==
- Roman Catholicism in Brazil
- St. Anthony of Padua

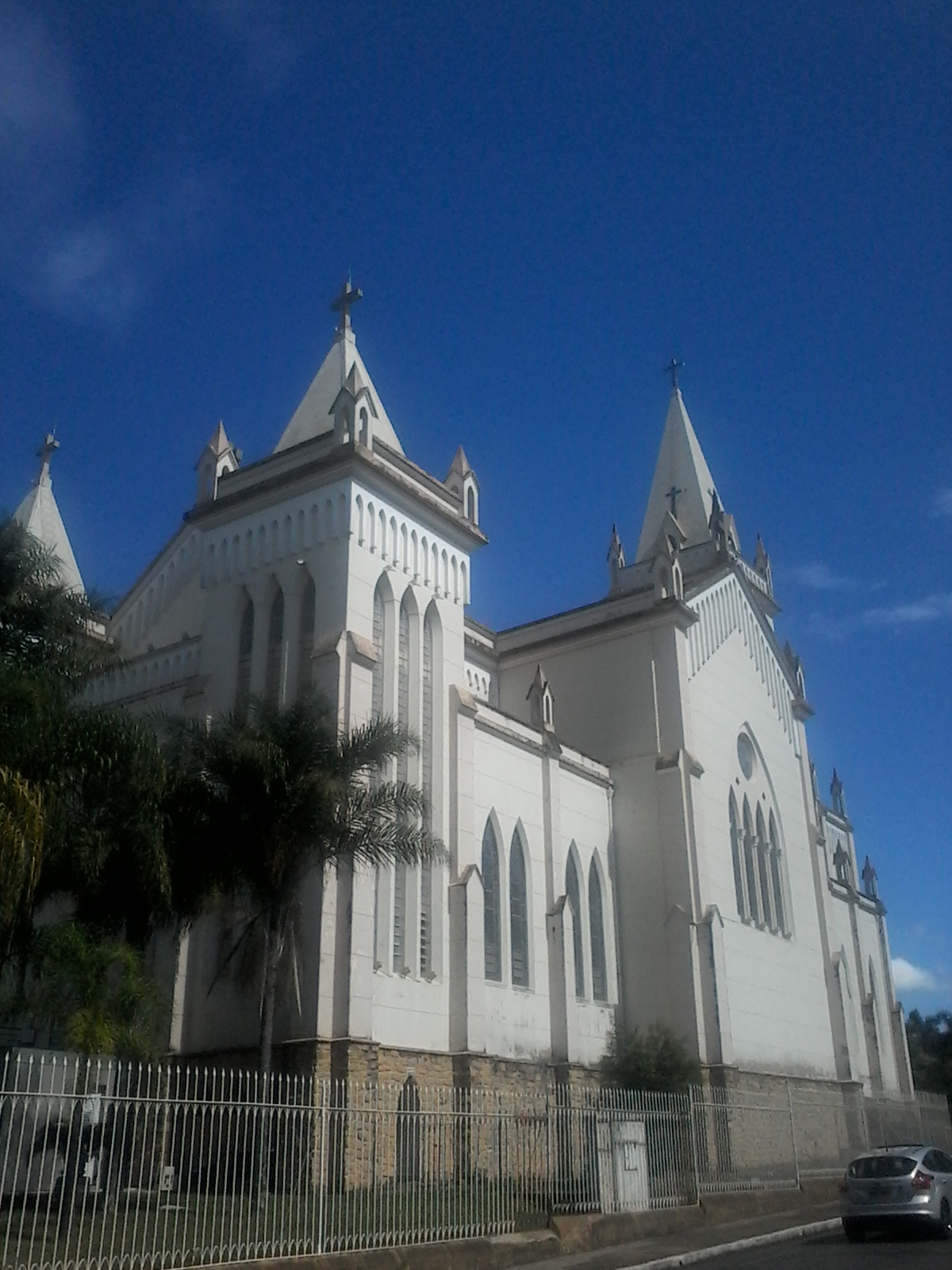
Another View
