= Old Cathedral of St. Anthony, Guaratinguetá =

Old Cathedral of St. Anthony
- Catedral Santo Antônio
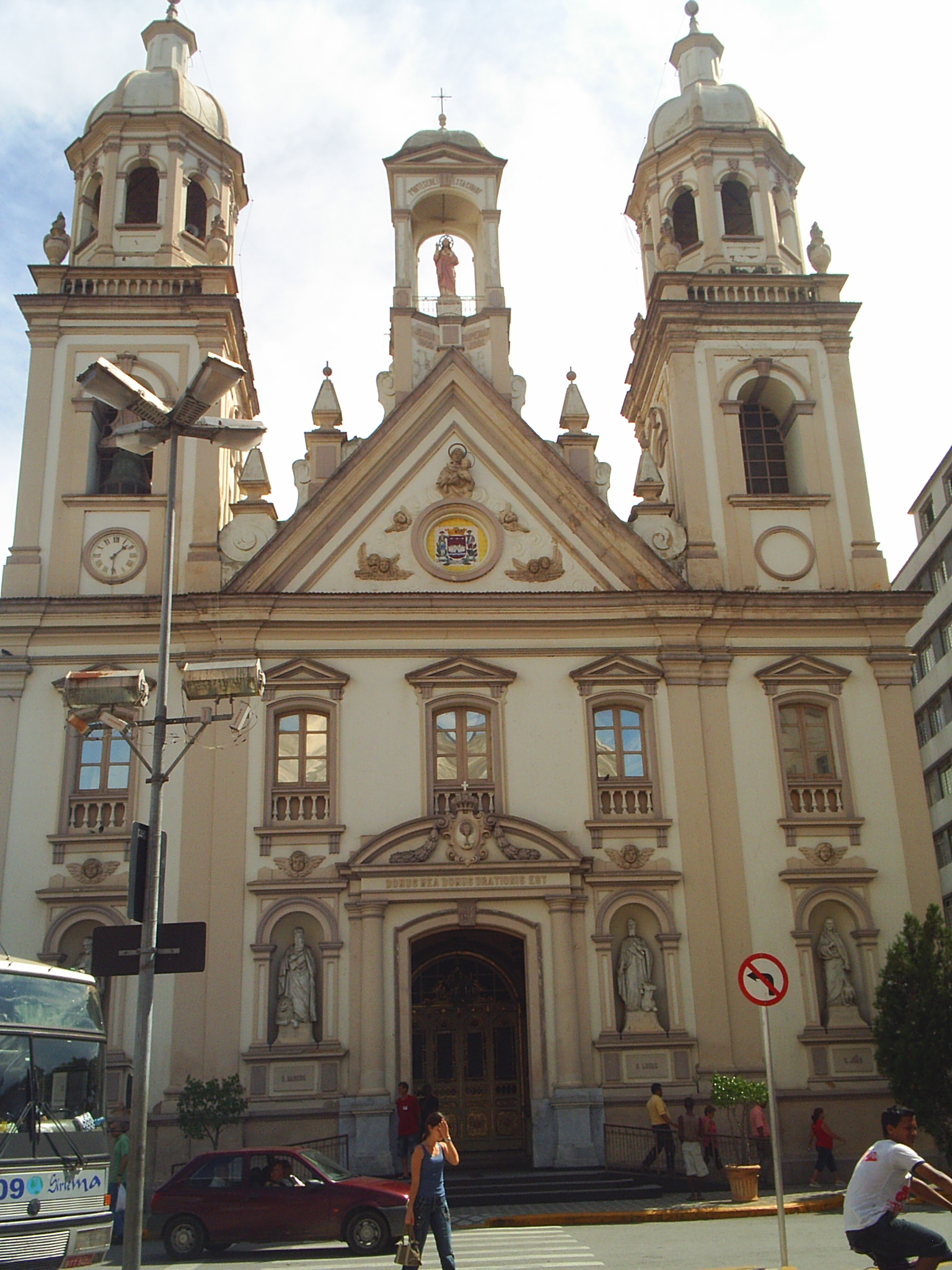
- Old Cathedral of St. Anthony
- 22°49′02″S 45°11′32″W
- Location: Guaratinguetá
- Country: Brazil
- Denomination: Roman Catholic Church

The St. Anthony Cathedral (Portuguese: Catedral Santo Antônio; Igreja de Santo Antônio) Also Old Cathedral of St. Anthony or St. Anthony Church It is the former archbishop's seat of the Catholic Archdiocese of Aparecida in Brazil. It is also the parish church of Santo António de Guaratingueta, created on February 25, 1651.

It is the oldest monument in Guaratinguetá. It began in a chapel erected with a thatched roof, around 1630, where it grew around the city. The original building underwent numerous renovations in 1701 and was extended between 1773 and 1780.

This cathedral was consecrated and celebrated its first mass in 1762 with São Frei Galvao, born in the city.

After the reform that took place between 1822 and 1847, it reaches its current configuration. The last elevation of the tower took place in 1913.

It became the Episcopal see of Aparecida in 1996, by decree of Cardinal-Archbishop Aloisio Lorscheider.

== See also ==
- Roman Catholicism in Brazil

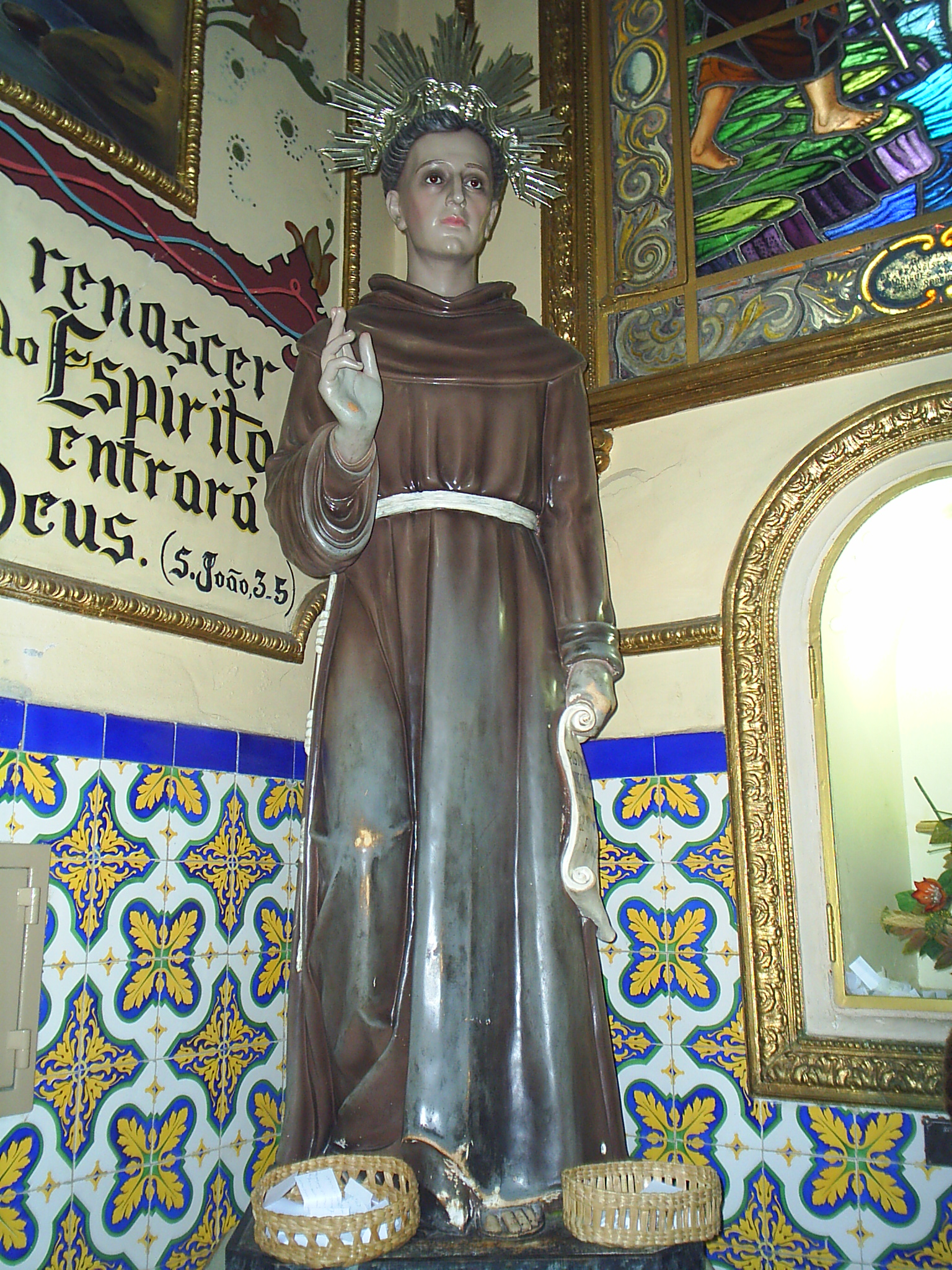
Internal view
