= St. Ann Cathedral, Feira de Santana =

St. Ann Cathedral
- Catedral Metropolitana de Sant'Ana
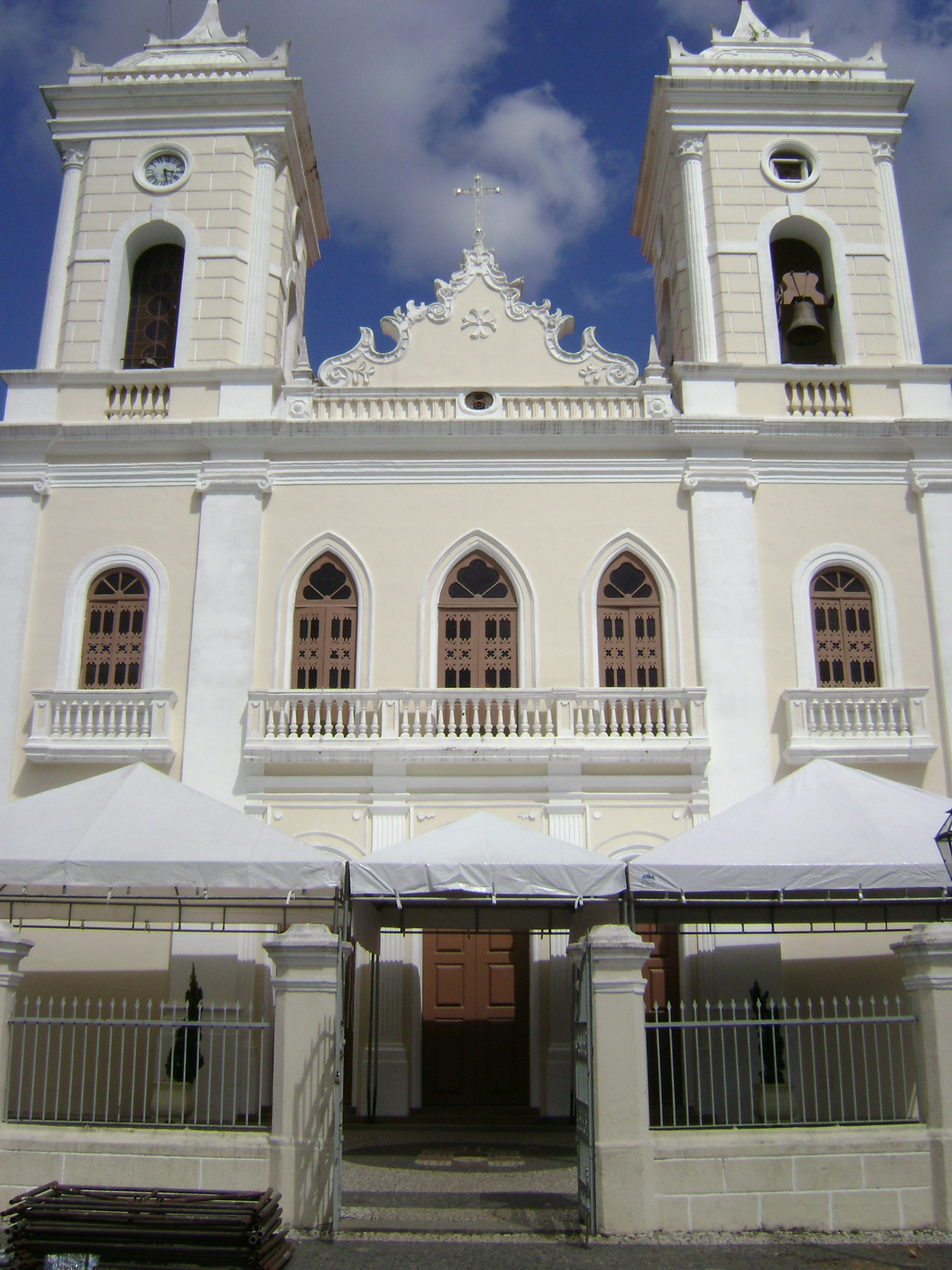
- St. Ann Cathedral
- 12.2595641°S 38.96841548°W
- Location: Feira de Santana
- Country: Brazil
- Denomination: Roman Catholic Church

The St. Ann Cathedral (Portuguese: Catedral Metropolitana de Sant'Ana), also known as the Feira de Santana Cathedral, is a Catholic cathedral in Feira de Santana, Bahia, Brazil. The cathedral is dedicated to Saint Anne and follows the Roman or Latin rite. The cathedral also functions as the seat of the Archdiocese of Feira de Santana (Archidioecesis Fori S. Annae), which was created in 1962 through the bull "Novae Ecclesiae" by Pope John XXIII. It is also the seat of the homonymous parish, which is located specifically in the Góes Calmon street, Centro district, in the Monsenhor Renato de Andrade Galvão Square. It is under the pastoral responsibility of Archbishop Zanoni Demettino Castro.

It was listed as a state heritage site by the Institute of Artistic and Cultural Heritage of Bahia in 1991.

== Location ==
The St. Ann Cathedral is located in the historic center of Feira de Santana on Praça Monsenhor Renato Galvão, a broad public square.

== Structure ==
The St. Ann Cathedral has three central arched portals with three choir windows of a similar design above. The façade is surmounted by a baroque-style pediment with volutes and a single crucifix. It is flanked by two bell towers that have windows even with those of the choir level, and another at the level of the belfry. The belfries is surmounted by pyramidal pinnacles of a type found the Chapel of Our Lady of the Conception (Capela de Nossa Senhora da Conceição) in Irará and the Chapel of Our Lady of Remedies (Capela de Nossa Senhora dos Remédios), also in Feira de Santana.

The church has a retangular floor plan and covers 944 square metres (10,160 ft^{2}).

== Protected status ==
The St. Ann Cathedral was listed as a historic structure by the State of Bahia in 1991 as historic site (tombo processo) no. 015/91.

== Access ==
The cathedral is open to the public, and may be visited.

== See also ==
- Roman Catholicism in Brazil
- St. Ann Cathedral

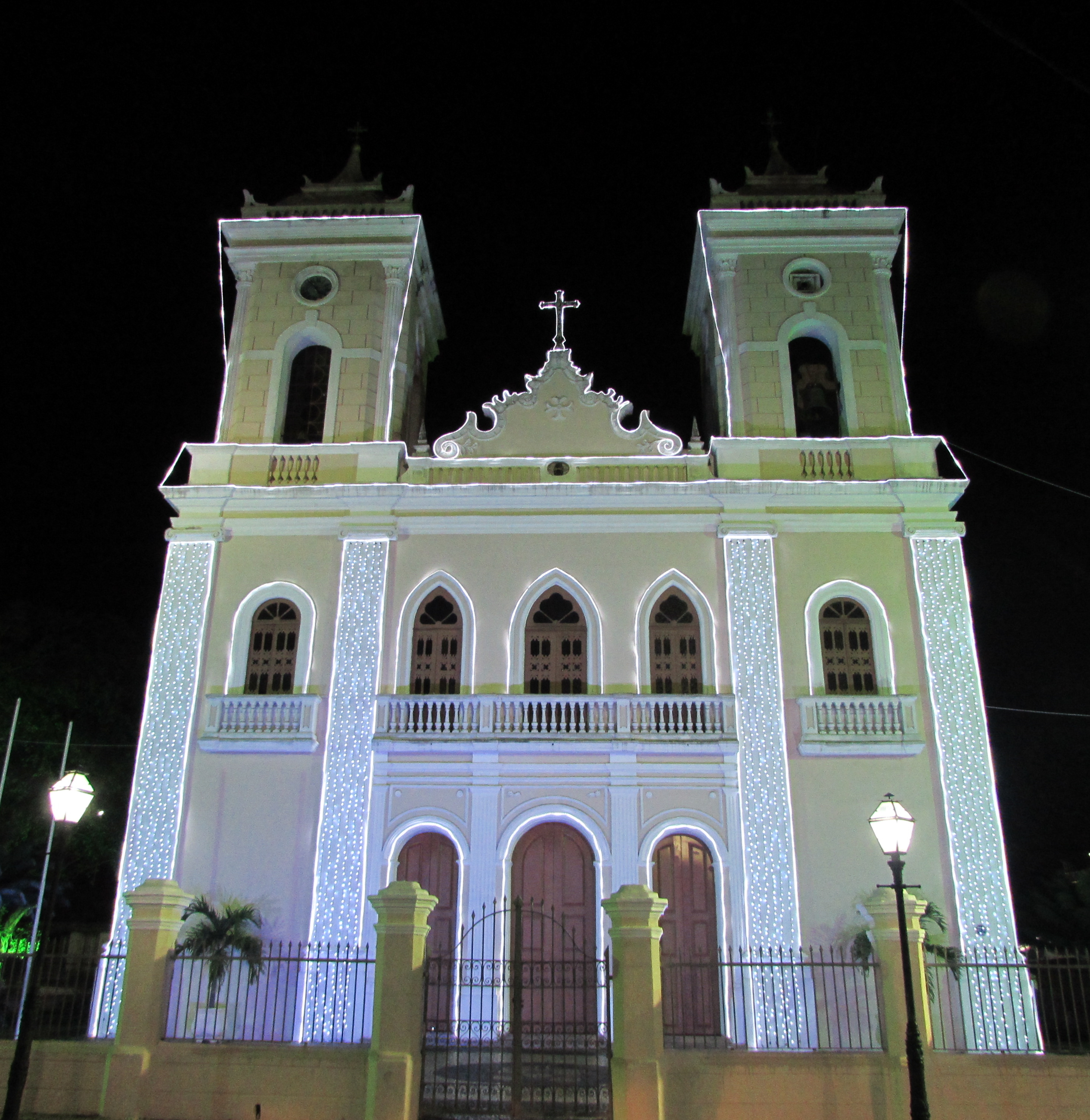
Another View
