= Our Lady of Exile and St. Catherine of Alexandria Cathedral, Florianópolis =

Coordinates: 27.59638°S 48.54930°W

Our Lady of Exile and St. Catherine of Alexandria Cathedral
- Catedral Metropolitana Nossa Senhora do Desterro e Santa Catarina de Alexandria
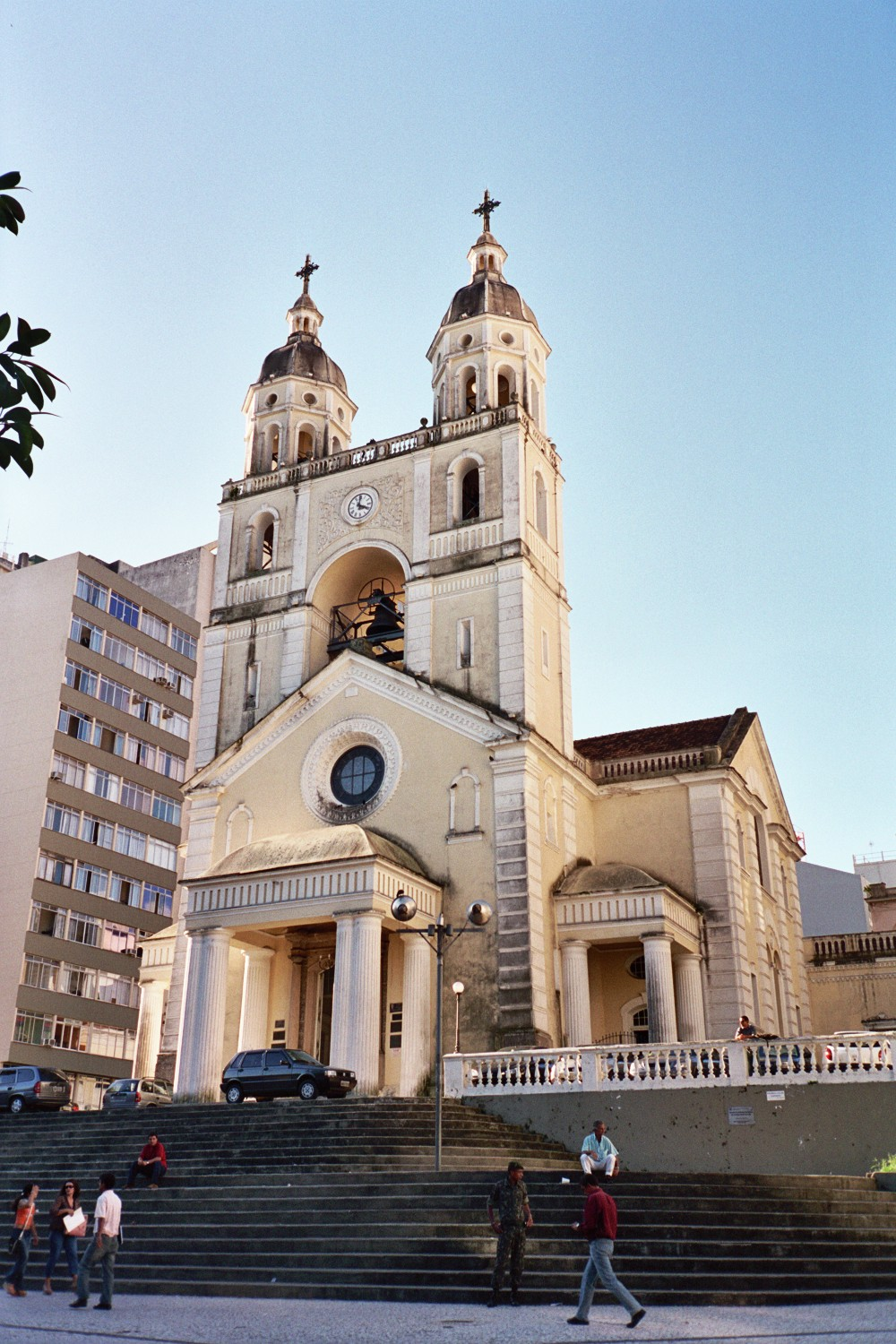
- Our Lady of Exile and St. Catherine of Alexandria Cathedral
- Location: Florianópolis
- Country: Brazil
- Denomination: Roman Catholic Church

History
- Dedication: Our Lady of Exile; St. Catherine of Alexandria

Administration
- Archdiocese: Roman Catholic Archdiocese of Florianópolis

The Our Lady of Exile and St. Catherine of Alexandria Cathedral (Portuguese: Catedral Metropolitana Nossa Senhora do Desterro e Santa Catarina de Alexandria) Also Florianópolis Cathedral It is a Catholic church dedicated to Our Lady of the Exile, which functions as the cathedral of the archdiocese of Florianópolis, since its creation on March 19, 1908. The building is protected by the National Historical and Artistic Heritage Institute of Brazil.

The definitive colonization of Florianópolis began in 1673. In 1679, Francisco Dias Velho required the legal title of the lands, beginning the construction of a church dedicated to the Virgin Mary. It was small and built with limestone. Inside it, the founder of Desterro (today Florianópolis) was assassinated. In 1908 it was elevated to the condition of Cathedral.

== See also ==
- Roman Catholicism in Brazil
- St. Catherine of Alexandria

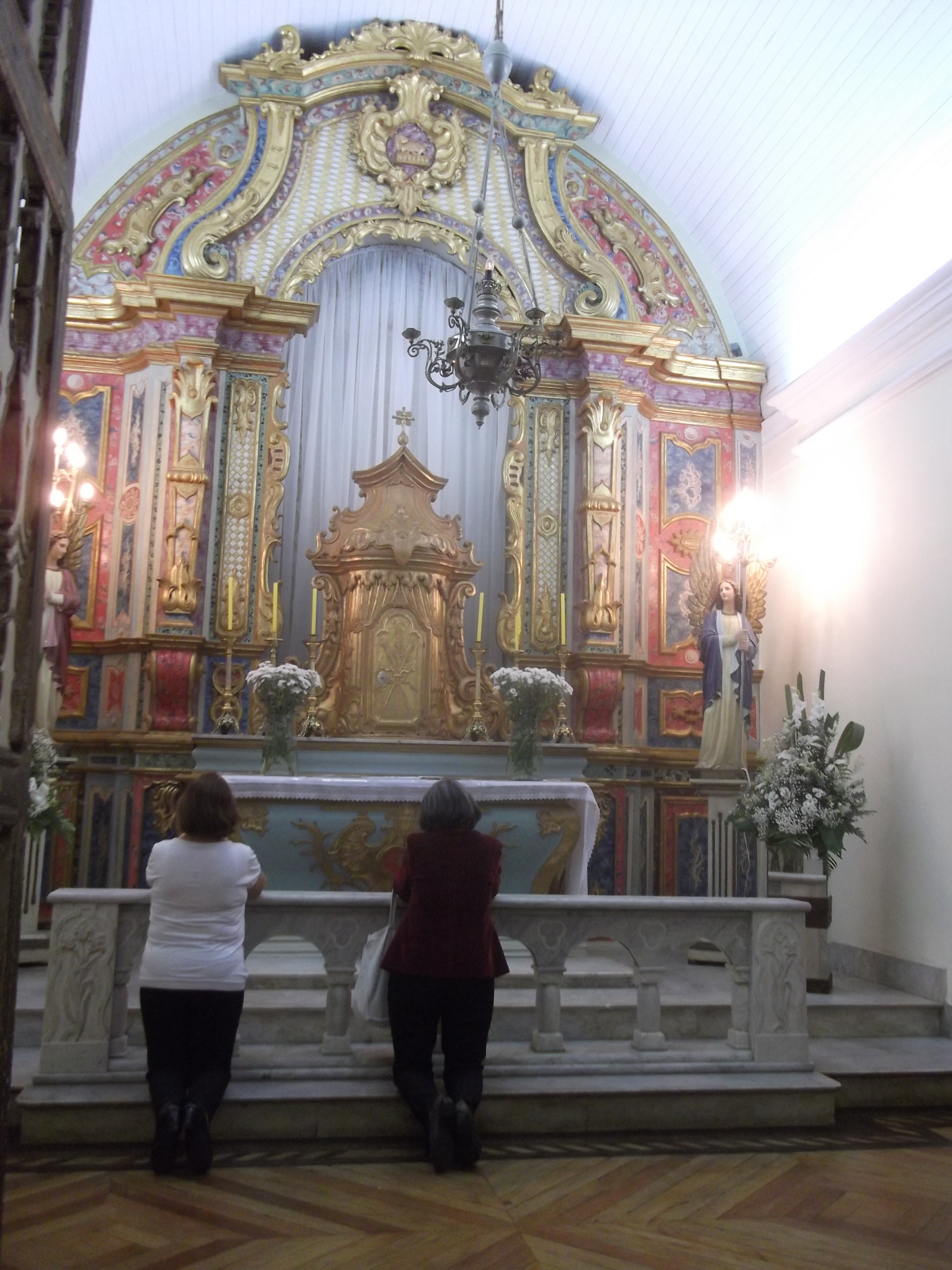
Internal view
