= Our Lady of Fatima Cathedral, Naviraí =

Our Lady of Fatima Cathedral
- Catedral Nossa Senhora de Fátima
- Our Lady of Fatima Cathedral
- Location: Naviraí
- Country: Brazil
- Denomination: Roman Catholic Church

The Our Lady of Fatima Cathedral (Portuguese: Catedral Nossa Senhora de Fátima), also known as Naviraí Cathedral, is a temple of the Catholic Church that functions as a cathedral located in the city of Naviraí, in the state of Mato Grosso do Sul in the South American country of Brazil. With that status in 2011, the cathedral is the seat of the Diocese of Naviraí and its complex includes the diocesan miter, the diocesan curia, pastoral centers, and the official residence the priest and bishop of the diocese. The first procession of the Virgin of Fatima on the site took place in 1953.

The current cathedral was built between 1972 and 1978. During the construction of the new Catholic church, it was assembled with an iron metal structure brought from Guaporé (RS) on June 24, 1974, and on August 6, Zinc tiles from Porto Alegre (RS).

In 2008 the request to create the Diocese of Naviraí was sent to the Holy See. The process was approved by Pope Benedict XVI in 2010 and announced the constitution of the new diocese on June 1, 2011.

== See also ==
- Roman Catholicism in Brazil
- Our Lady of Fatima
