= St. Ann Cathedral, Mogi das Cruzes =

Catholic cathedral in Mogi das Cruzes, Brazil

St. Ann Cathedral
- Catedral Sant’Ana
- St. Ann Cathedral
- Location: Mogi das Cruzes
- Country: Brazil
- Denomination: Roman Catholic Church

The St. Ann Cathedral (Portuguese: Catedral Sant’Ana) Also Mogi das Cruzes Cathedral Is a church located in Mogi das Cruzes, Brazil, which was built on the same site where the first chapel was erected, and where in 1900 a church was set up for Our Lady of Sant'Ana, which is now the seat of the Diocese of Mogi das Cruzes, erected in 1962 by Pope John XXIII.

In 1952 was designed by Monsignor Roque Pinto de Barros, the Parochial Vicar, a new parish church.

The construction of the project was inspired by the Roman architecture of the first Christian churches, its facade is composed of a central body, which corresponds to the central nave, flanked by two towers. A set of three arch frames protrudes into the formation of the outer atrium. Under the tower on the right is the baptistery.

The Church of Our Lady of Santa Ana, marks the initial historical center of the city of Mogi das Cruzes.

== See also ==
- Roman Catholicism in Brazil
- St. Ann Cathedral
