= Our Lady of Fatima Cathedral, Jardim =

Our Lady of Fatima Cathedral
- Catedral Nossa Senhora de Fátima
- Our Lady of Fatima Cathedral
- 21.4802°S 56.1562°W
- Location: Jardim
- Country: Brazil
- Denomination: Roman Catholic Church

Our Lady of Fatima Cathedral (Portuguese: Catedral Nossa Senhora de Fátima), also known as Jardim Cathedral, is a religious building of the Catholic Church in the city Jardim in the state of Mato Grosso do Sul, Brazil.

The church follows the Roman or Latin rite and is the headquarters of the Catholic Diocese of Jardim (Diocese Viridariensis) that was created in 1981 through the bull "Spiritalibus necessitatibus" of Pope John Paul II. Its complex includes the diocesan miter, the diocesan curia, the center of the pastoral, and the official residence of the priest and bishop of the diocese.

It is under the pastoral responsibility of Bishop João Gilberto de Moura.

== See also ==
- Roman Catholicism in Brazil
- Our Lady of Fatima
