= St. Ann Cathedral, Ponta Grossa =

St. Ann Cathedral
- Catedral Sant'Ana
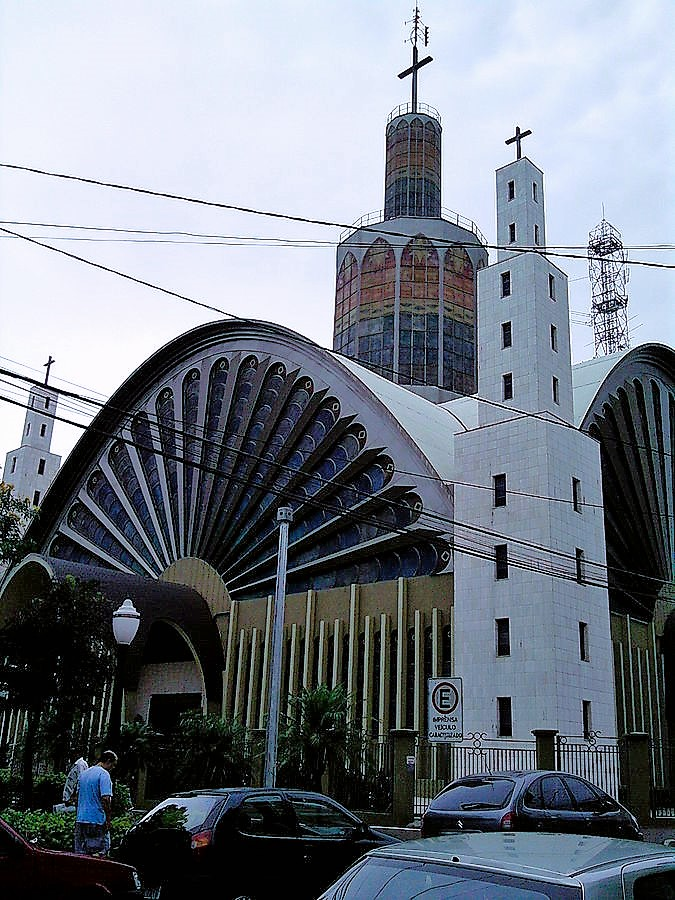
- St. Ann Cathedral
- 25°05′53″S 50°09′32″W
- Location: Ponta Grossa
- Country: Brazil
- Denomination: Roman Catholic Church

Architecture
- Style: Modern architecture

Administration
- Diocese: Roman Catholic Diocese of Ponta Grossa

The St. Ann Cathedral (also Ponta Grossa Cathedral; Portuguese: Catedral Sant’Ana) is a Catholic church located in the center of Paraná in the city of Ponta Grossa in southern Brazil. The church is the seat of the Diocese of Ponta Grossa.

On September 15, 1823, Ponta Grossa became a parish, after which the need arose to build a new, larger chapel to serve the population in place of the old tiled roof chapel dedicated to St. Ann built by Dom Pedro I, the ninth parish of Paraná.

In 1906 the Italian Nicolas Ferigotti was hired to remodel the church. Ferigotti presented a project considered daring, because although eclecticism was common at that time, western churches were predominantly built in Greco-Roman style. The building was inaugurated in 1910. On May 10, 1926, the Diocese of Ponta Grossa was created and the church was elevated to the category of cathedral.

It was remodeled again in 1978 and was re-inaugurated in 2009.

== See also ==
- Roman Catholicism in Brazil
- St. Ann Cathedral
- Sant'Ana FM
