= Sant'Ana FM =

Catholic radio station in Ponta Grossa, Paraná, Brazil

Sant'Ana FM (ZYX991)
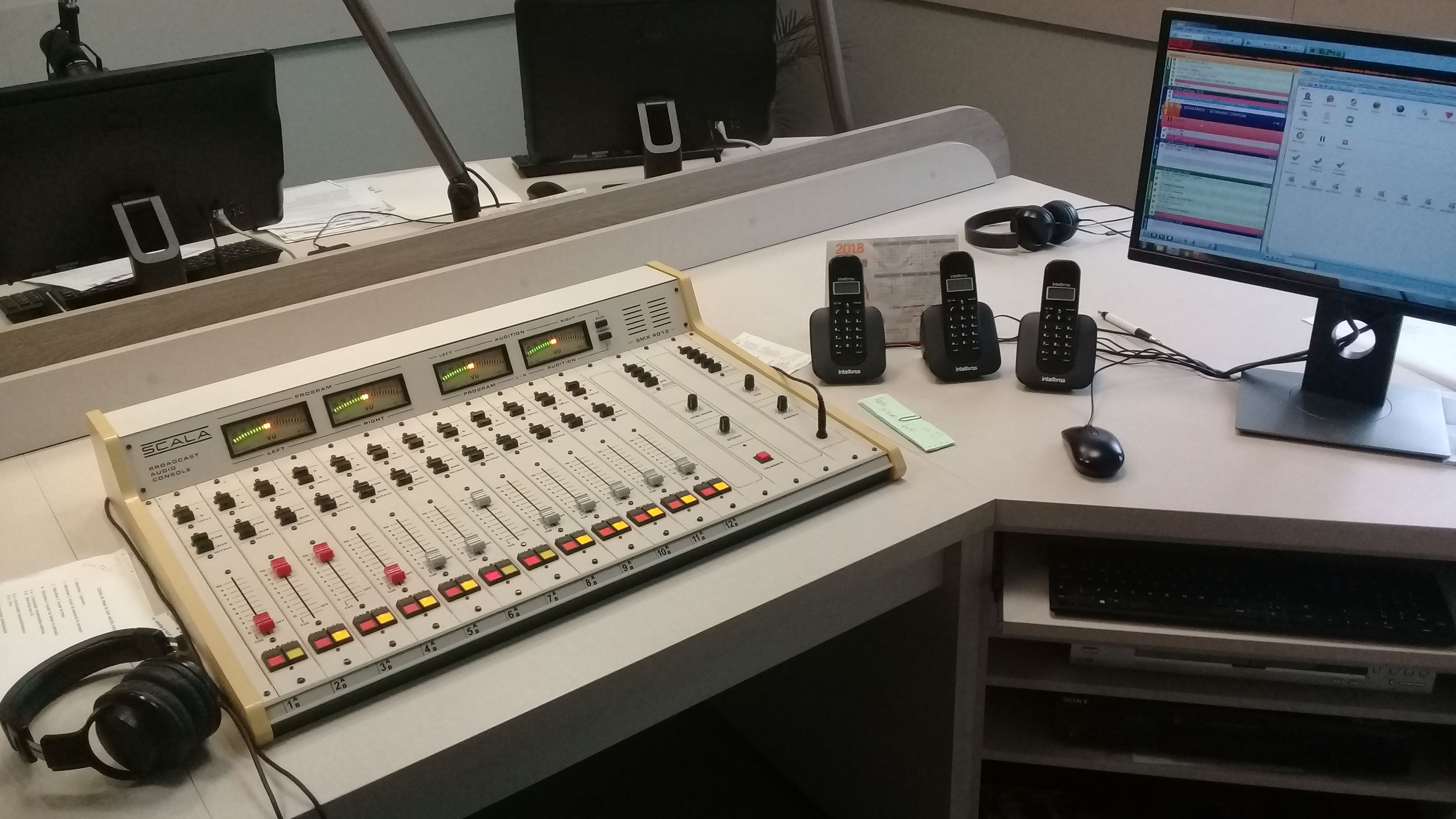

Ponta Grossa, Paraná; Brazil
- Broadcast area: Campos Gerais of Paraná
- Frequency: 89.7 MHz

Programming
- Language: Brazilian Portuguese
- Format: Catholic radio / Variety
- Affiliations: Rede Católica de Rádio; Rede Aparecida de Rádio

Ownership
- Owner: Roman Catholic Diocese of Ponta Grossa; (Fundação Sant'Ana)

History
- Founded: August 9, 1961
- Former call signs: ZYE77 (1961–1965); ZYE96 (1965–1995); ZYZ272 (1995–2017)
- Former frequencies: 1420 kHz (1961–1965); 900 kHz (1965–2017)

Technical information
- Licensing authority: ANATEL
- Class: A2
- ERP: 23.5 kW
- Transmitter coordinates: 25°3′10″S 50°10′7″W

Links
- Public license information: Profile
- Webcast: Live Player
- Website: www.radiosantana.com.br

Sant'Ana FM is a Catholic radio station of Ponta Grossa, southern Brazil, operating on FM 89.7 MHz. It belongs to the diocese of the city. It is part of the Rede Católica de Rádio (in English: "Catholic Radio Network") and the Rede Aparecida de Rádio (in English: "Aparecida Radio Network"). Its programming combines religious and variety programs with some Catholic messages.

== History ==
Through the concession granted the station began operating on August 9, 1961, with power of 100 wats at the frequency of 1420 kHz, 211.20 meters, by the prefix ZYE-77. On April 19, 1965, with the permission of Contel (Anatel's predecessor), it was identified as ZYE-96 at 900 kHz, with festivities and campaigns with jingles. A new Continental-Lorenza transmitter was installed on December 6, 1966, being one of the first investments made by the director of the time and Bishop Murilo Ramos Kruguer, diocesan bishop of this period. As of November 24, 1995 started to operate with 3 kW, with a new prefix ZYZ-272. Anatel approved the change of power of the radio, according to changes in the documentation from Anatel, the Brazilian broadcasting regulatory agency., definitively on November 23, 2000, it sends its signal with 5 kW. The directors begin to equip with air links, mobile units, computerization and own headquarters. According to Radio Sant'Ana, with the increase in power, its reach reaches 20 municipalities (approximately 850 thousand inhabitants) of its area of coverage.

Provisionally, its studios were located in the old São Luís College, with its first technical operator Osmar Dias de Oliveira, the official date of inauguration where it happened to be transmitted by radio was April 28, 1962 (although that by Contel is authorized only on May 10, 1963) with the blessings of Dom Antônio Mazzarotto, for which it was a wish of the same, with celebrations in the Club Princess of the Fields, with presence also of Agnaldo Rayol, Duo Pianístico, Sexteto Paulistano of Guitars and Conjunto Madrigal . In the mid-1960s by the study of the Faculty of Philosophy, Science and Letters (current UEPG) showed that the radio had a total of 259 apparatuses, the largest among all broadcasters from Ponta Grossa. In March 1966, Marechal Floriano Peixoto Square, the highest point of the city (980 m), next to the St. Ann Cathedral, continued the custom of classifying itself as "the best sound", complementing "The radio success!" and later as "the most powerful AM radio in Ponta Grossa".

On April 21, 2016, Iraci Travisani Rosa died. He was responsible for the installation of Radio Emissora Sant'Ana Ltda (first social name) in the city.

On October 9, 2017, the station officially migrated from AM to FM.
