= Archdiocese of Londrina =

Latin Catholic territory in Brazil

Coordinates: 23.3121°S 51.1597°W

Archdiocese of Londrina Archidioecesis Londrinensis

Catholic
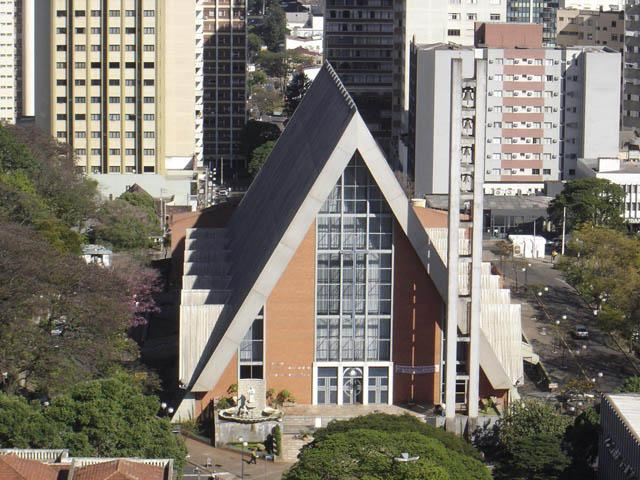
- Metropolitan Cathedral of the Sacred Heart of Jesus

- Coat of arms

Location
- Country: Brazil
- Ecclesiastical province: Londrina

Statistics
- Area: 6,594 km^{2} (2,546 sq mi)
- Population: Total; Catholics: (as of 2004); 900,000; 658,800 (73.2%)

Information
- Denomination: Catholic Church
- Sui iuris church: Latin Church
- Rite: Roman Rite
- Established: 1 February 1956 (70 years ago)
- Cathedral: Catedral Metropolitana Sagrado Coração de Jesus

Current leadership
- Pope: Leo XIV
- Archbishop: Geremias Steinmetz

Website
- http://arquidioceselondrina.com.br/

The Archdiocese of Londrina (Latin: Archidioecesis Londrinensis) is a Latin Church ecclesiastical jurisdiction or archdiocese of the Catholic Church in Paraná state, southern Brazil.

Its cathedral is Catedral Metropolitana Sagrado Coração de Jesus, dedicated to the Sacred Heart of Jesus, in the archiepiscopal see of Londrina.

== History ==
- February 1, 1956: Established as Diocese of Londrina on territory split off from the Diocese of Jacarezinho
- Lost territory on 1964.11.28 to establish Diocese of Apucarana, now its suffragan
- October 31, 1970: Promoted as Metropolitan Archdiocese of Londrina

== Ecclesiastical province ==
The Metropolitan has the following Suffragan sees :

- Roman Catholic Diocese of Apucarana, its daughter
- Roman Catholic Diocese of Cornélio Procópio
- Roman Catholic Diocese of Jacarezinho

== Statistics ==
As of 2014, it pastorally served 728,000 Catholics (73.4% of 992,000 total) on 6,714 km² in 76 parishes and 245 missions with 146 priests (75 diocesan, 71 religious), 59 deacons, 383 lay religious (145 brothers, 238 sisters) and 8 seminarians.

== Ordinaries ==
Suffragan Bishop of Londrina

- Geraldo Fernandes Bijos, Claretians (C.M.F.) (16 November 1956 – 31 October 1970 see below)

Metropolitan Archbishops of Londrina

- Geraldo Fernandes Bijos, C.M.F. (see above 31 October 1970 – 28 March death 1982), also Vice-President of National Conference of Bishops of Brazil (1974 – 1979)
  - Auxiliary Bishop: Antônio Agostinho Marochi (1973.09.27 – 1976.02.02), Titular Bishop of Thabraca (1973.09.27 – 1976.02.02); later Bishop of Presidente Prudente (Brazil) (1976.02.02 – 2002.02.20)
  - Auxiliary Bishop: Luiz Colussi (1978.01.03 – 1980.03.28), Titular Bishop of Gor (1978.01.03 – 1980.03.28); next Coadjutor Bishop of Lins (Brazil) (1980.03.28 – 1980.10.11), succeeding as Bishop of Lins (1980.10.11 – 1983.12.05), Bishop of Caçador (Brazil) (1983.12.05 – death 1996.12.04)
- Geraldo Majella Agnelo, (4 October 1982 – 16 September 1991); previously Bishop of Toledo (Brazil) (1978.05.05 – 1982.10.04); later Secretary of Congregation for Divine Worship and the Discipline of the Sacraments (1991.09.16 – 1999.01.13), Second Vice-President of Latin American Episcopal Council (1999 – 2003), Metropolitan Archbishop of São Salvador da Bahia (Brazil) (1999.01.13 – 2011.01.12), created Cardinal-Priest of S. Gregorio Magno alla Magliana Nuova (2001.02.21 [2001.05.20] – ...), President of National Conference of Bishops of Brazil (2003.05 – 2007.05)
- Albano Bortoletto Cavallin (11 March 1992 – retired 10 May 2006), died 2017; previously Titular Bishop of Aquæ novæ in Numidia (1973.06.14 – 1986.10.24) as Auxiliary Bishop of Archdiocese of Curitiba (Brazil) (1973.06.14 – 1986.10.24), Bishop of Guarapuava (Brazil) (1986.10.24 – 1992.03.11)
  - Auxiliary Bishop: Vicente Costa (born Malta) (1998.07.01 – 2002.10.09), Titular Bishop of Aquæ flaviæ (1998.07.01 – 2002.10.09); next Bishop of Umuarama (Brazil) (2002.10.09 – 2009.12.30), Bishop of Jundiaí (Brazil) (2009.12.30 – ...)
  - Auxiliary Bishop: José Lanza Neto (2004.06.23 – 2007.06.13), Titular Bishop of Mades (2004.06.23 – 2007.06.13); later Bishop of Guaxupé (Brazil) (2007.06.13 – ...)
- Orlando Brandes (10 May 2006 – 16 November 2016), previously Bishop of Joinville (Brazil) (1994.03.09 – 2006.05.10); next Metropolitan Archbishop of Aparecida (Brazil) (2016.11.16 – ...)
- Geremias Steinmetz (14 June 2017 – ...), previously Bishop of Paranavaí (Brazil) (2011.01.05 – 2017.06.14).

== See also ==
- List of Catholic dioceses in Brazil

== Sources ==
- GCatholic.org, with Google map - data for all sections
- Archdiocese website (Portuguese)
- Catholic Hierarchy
