= José Maria Maimone =

Brazilian Roman Catholic bishop (born 1932)

Most Reverend José Maria Maimone SAC
- Bishop of Umuarama
- Province: Maringá
- Diocese: Umuarama
- Installed: 12 June 1973
- Term ended: 8 May 2002
- Predecessor: Diocese established
- Successor: Vicente Costa
- Previous post: Rector of the St. Vincent Pallotti Seminary in Londrina (1966–1971)

Orders
- Ordination: 29 June 1961
- Consecration: 29 June 1973 by Pope Paul VI, Agostino Casaroli and Bernardin Gantin

Personal details
- Born: José Maria Maimone; 6 October 1932 (age 93) Astolfo Dutra, Minas Gerais, Brazil
- Motto: Amou-os até o fim

José Maria Maimone SAC (born 6 October 1932) is a Brazilian Roman Catholic prelate. He served as the first bishop of the Diocese of Umuarama from 1973 until his resignation in 2002.

== Biography ==
José Maria Maimone was born in Astolfo Dutra, Minas Gerais, on 6 October 1932. He graduated with a technical degree in accounting in 1951, in Londrina, entered the religious congregation of the Society of Catholic Apostolate (Pallottines) and joined the seminary of the Palotino Fathers in 1955. He was ordained a priest on 29 June 1961.

On 12 June 1973, Pope Paul VI appointed Maimone as the first bishop of the newly erected Diocese of Umuarama in the state of Paraná. He received his episcopal consecration on 29 June 1973 at the St. Peter's Basilica in Rome from Pope Paul VI, with Archbishops Agostino Casaroli and Bernardin Gantin serving as co-consecrators. He was canonically installed in the diocese on 16 September 1973.

During his nearly three-decade tenure, Bishop Maimone oversaw the foundational growth of the diocese, establishing numerous parishes and pastoral ministries.

On 8 May 2002, Pope John Paul II accepted his resignation from the pastoral governance of the diocese in accordance with Canon 401 § 2 of the Code of Canon Law. Upon his resignation, he assumed the status of bishop emeritus and continued to reside within the diocese, assisting with pastoral activities and community life. In 2021, he celebrated his diamond jubilee (60 years) of priestly ordination.
