= Vicente Costa =

His Excellency Vicente Costa
- Bishop of Jundiaí
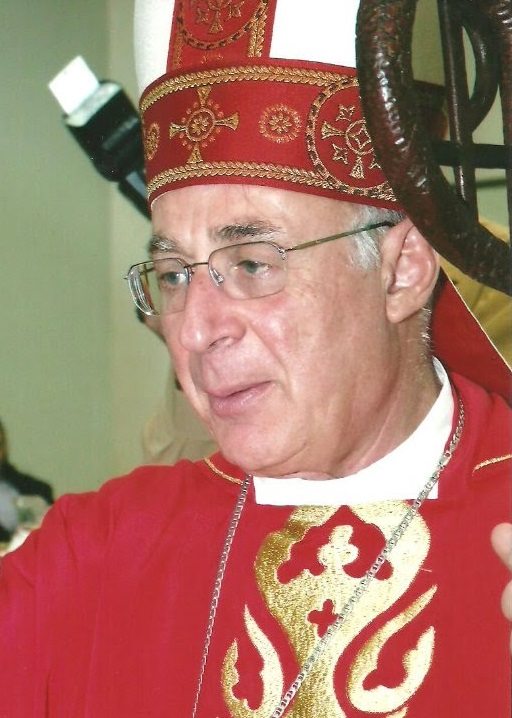
- Church: Roman Catholic
- Diocese: Jundiaí
- Appointed: 30 December 2009
- Installed: 7 March 2010
- Predecessor: Gil Antônio Moreira
- Previous posts: Auxiliary Bishop of Londrina (1998-2002); Bishop of Umuarama (2002-2009)

Orders
- Ordination: 17 December 1972
- Consecration: 19 September 1998 by Murilo Ramos Krieger
- Rank: Bishop

Personal details
- Born: 1 January 1947 (age 79) Birkirkara Malta
- Motto: Quodcumque Dixerit Vobis Facite
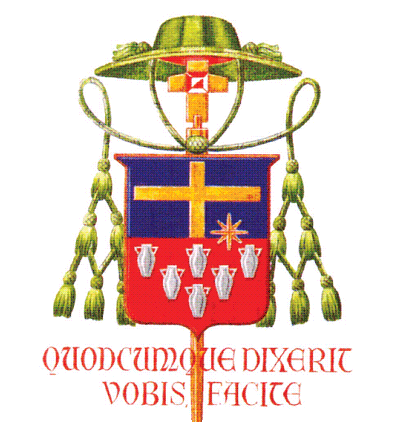
- Coat of arms

Vicente Costa (born 1 January 1947) is a Maltese Catholic bishop of the Diocese of Jundiaí in Brazil.

Costa was born in Birkirkara, Malta on 1 January 1947. He received his primary education in Birkirkara from 1954 to 1957 and then for his secondary schooling he went to the Minor Seminary of Floriana. In 1964 he started his studies at the University of Malta where he obtained a degree in philosophy. He left for Brazil where he started his studies for the priesthood. Costa studied at the Pontifical Gregorian University in Rome between 1969 and 1971. He was ordained priest on 17 December 1972.

In 1973 Costa became rector of the Cathedral of Maringá and later was transferred to São Jorge do Ivaí as parish priest. He also served in other parishes throughout the country. In 1994 he resumed his post as Parochial Vicar of the Cathedral of Maringáuntil 1997. In 1998 Pope John Paul II appointed him Auxiliary Bishop of Londrina. He was consecrated in September 1998 by the Archbishop of Maringá Murilo Ramos Krieger. He was given the titular see of Aquae Flaviae.

In 2002 Costa was appointed as Bishop of Umuarama. He was installed on 13 December 2002. Seven years later Pope Benedict XVI transferred him to the larger Diocese of Jundiaí. He was installed as the fifth bishop on 7 March 2010.
