= Diocese of Paranavaí =

Catholic ecclesiastical territory

Diocese of Paranavaí Dioecesis Paranavaiensis

Catholic

Location
- Country: Brazil
- Ecclesiastical province: Maringá

Statistics
- Area: 8,699 km^{2} (3,359 sq mi)
- Population: Total; Catholics: (as of 2004); 237,071; 201,510 (85.0%)

Information
- Denomination: Catholic Church
- Sui iuris church: Latin Church
- Rite: Roman Rite
- Established: 20 January 1968 (58 years ago)
- Cathedral: Catedral Maria Mãe da Igreja

Current leadership
- Pope: Leo XIV
- Bishop: Mário Spaki

Website
- www.maedaigreja.org.br

The Diocese of Paranavaí (Latin: Dioecesis Paranavaiensis) is a Latin Church ecclesiastical territory or diocese of the Catholic Church in Brazil. It is a suffragan diocese in the ecclesiastical province of the metropolitan Archdiocese of Maringá in Paraná.

Its cathedral is Catedral Maria Mãe da Igreja, dedicated to Mary Mother of the Church, in the episcopal see of Paranavaí. The Bishop of Paranavaí has been Mário Spaki since 2018.

== History ==
- 20 January 1968: Established as Diocese of Paranavaí, on territory split off from the then Diocese of Maringá (now its Metropolitan) under the Bishop Jaime Luiz Coelho.

== Statistics ==
As of 2014, it pastorally served 228,000 Catholics (85.4% of 267,000 total) on 8,699 km^{2} in 35 parishes and 1 mission with 41 priests (34 diocesan, 7 religious), 64 lay religious (21 brothers, 43 sisters) and 4 seminarians.

== Episcopal ordinaries and coadjutor bishop ==
Suffragan Bishops of Paranavaí

- Benjamin de Souza Gomes (11 March 1968 - retired 12 October 1985), died 1995
- Rubens Augusto de Souza Espínola (12 October 1985 - retired 3 December 2003) previously Titular Bishop of Bilta (1980.12.20 – 1985.10.12) as Auxiliary Bishop of Diocese of São Luís de Montes Belos (Brazil) (1980.12.20 – 1985.10.12), died 2017
  - Coadjutor Bishop: Elizeu de Morais Pimentel (2001.12.19 – death 2003.02.27)
- Sérgio Aparecido Colombo (3 December 2003 – 16 September 2009), appointed Bishop of Bragança Paulista, São Paulo
- Geremias Steinmetz (5 January 2011 - 14 June 2017), appointed Archbishop of Londrina, Parana
- Mário Spaki (25 April 2018 – present)

== See also ==
- List of Catholic dioceses in Brazil

== Sources and external links ==
- GCatholic.org - data for al sections
- Catholic Hierarchy
- Diocese website (Portuguese)
