= Mamede =

Mamede is a surname. Notable people with the surname include:

- Ariel Mamede (born 1989), Brazilian football coach
- Fernando Mamede (1951–2026), Portuguese long-distance runner
- João Mamede Filho (born 1951), Brazilian Roman Catholic bishop
- José Mamede (born 1974), Portuguese footballer
- Mia Mamede (born 1995), Brazilian model, actress, and beauty pageant titleholder
