= João Mamede Filho =

21st-century Brazilian Catholic bishop

João Mamede Filho O.F.M. Conv.
- Bishop of Umuarama
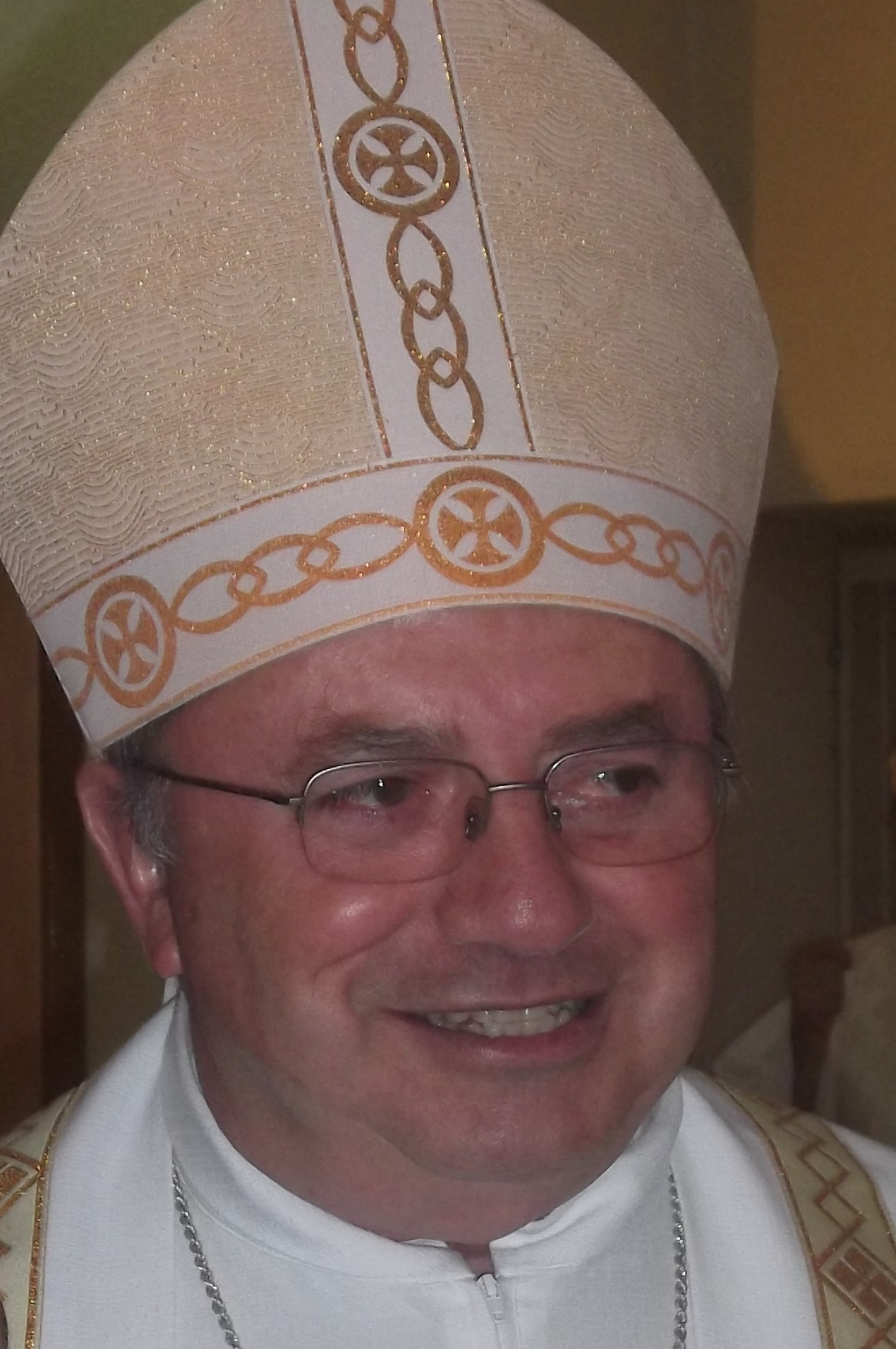
- Church: Roman Catholic Church
- Diocese: Diocese of Umuarama
- Predecessor: Vicente Costa

Orders
- Ordination: 21 April 1978 by Cláudio Hummes
- Consecration: 1 July 2006 by Cláudio Hummes

Personal details
- Born: 21 August 1951 (age 74) Caçapava, SP, Brazil
- Denomination: Roman Catholic
- Motto: NO EVANGELHO FORÇA DE DEUS

João Mamede Filho O.F.M. Conv. (born 21 August 1951) is the Brazilian Roman Catholic bishop of Diocese of Umuarama, being appointed in 2010.

== Biography ==
Born in Caçapava in 1951, he joined the Order of Conventual Friars Minor in 1974, and was ordained a priest in 1978. On April 26, 2006 he was appointed bishop by Pope Benedict XVI and appointed to be auxiliary in São Paulo with the titular head office of Aquae Albae in Mauretania. He received episcopal ordination on 1 July 2006 from Cardinal Cláudio Hummes. His episcopal motto is "In the gospel strength of God".

From 2006 to 2010 he was auxiliary bishop of the Archdiocese of São Paulo and responsible for the Lapa Episcopal Region. On 24 November 2010 he was appointed bishop of Umuarama by Pope Benedict XVI and was sworn in on 12 February 2011.

He was appointed on 20 November 2019, apostolic administrator of the Archdiocese of Maringá, by Pope Francis, following the resignation of Anuar Battisti, and he held the post until 15 August 2020 when a successor was named.
