= Mário Spaki =

Brazilian prelate of the Catholic Church (born 1971)

- Bishop of Paranavaí
- Church: Catholic Church
- Diocese: Diocese of Paranavaí
- Appointed: 25 April 2018
- Predecessor: Geremias Steinmetz

Orders
- Ordination: 3 August 2003 by Murilo Ramos Krieger
- Consecration: 22 June 2018 by Sérgio Arthur Braschi

Personal details
- Born: 14 December 1971 (age 54) Irati, Paraná, Brazil
- Coat of arms

Mário Spaki (born 14 December 1971) is a Brazilian prelate of the Catholic Church who has been Bishop of Paranavaí since July 2018.

Coat of arms of Mário Spaki.

== Biography ==
Mário Spaki was born on 14 December 1971 in Irati, in the Diocese of Ponta Grossa, Paraná, Brazil. He completed his studies in philosophy in Ponta Grossa. He spent a year studying spirituality at Escola Sacerdotal Vinea Mea in Florence and then studied theology at the Pontifical Gregorian University in Rome in 1998, where he obtained a licentiate in dogmatic theology in 2001. He also trained as a journalist at the Pontifical Catholic University of Paraná in Curitiba. While still a seminarian, he began ten years of teaching at the Institute of Philosophy in Ponte Grossa.

On 3 August 2003 he was ordained a priest of the Diocese of Ponta Grossa. He served as parish vicar of São José in 2003 and as rector of the São José Philosophy Seminary from 2004 to 2012. From 2013 to 2018 he was executive secretary of the South Region 2 of the Episcopal Conference of Brazil (CNBB).

Pope Francis appointed him Bishop of Paranavaí on 25 April 2018.

He received his episcopal consecration in Sant’Ana, Cathedral, Ponta Grossa, on 22 June from Sérgio Arthur Braschi, Bishop of Ponta Grossa. He was installed in his diocese on 8 July at a service where the diocese ended its celebration of its fiftieth year. He was the first bishop from Iraqi; at the time of his appointment he was the youngest Brazilian bishop, 46 years old.
