= Jaime Luiz Coelho =

Catholic archbishop

- Archbishop of Archdiocese of Maringa (Emeritus)
- Church: Roman Catholic Church
- See: Archdiocese of Maringa
- In office: 1956–1997
- Predecessor: None
- Successor: Murilo Sebastião Ramos Krieger
- Previous post: Priest

Orders
- Ordination: December 7, 1941

Personal details
- Born: July 26, 1916 Franca, Brazil
- Died: August 5, 2013 (aged 97) Maringá, Paraná, Brazil

Jaime Luiz Coelho (Portuguese pronunciation: [ˈʒɐ̃jmi ˈlwis kuˈeʎu]; July 26, 1916 – August 5, 2013) was a Brazilian archbishop of the Roman Catholic Church. At his death at the age of 97 he was one of the oldest bishops in the Church and one of the oldest Brazilian bishops.

== Early life ==
The son of João Amélio Coelho and Guilhermina Cunha, Coelho was born in Franca, Brazil. At age eight he was an altar boy at the Cathedral of Our Lady of the Conception in Franca. He attended high school at the Colégio São José in Batatais, run by Claretian fathers, and in 1935 entered the Seminary of Maria Imaculada do Ipiranga in São Paulo, where he studied philosophy and theology. On December 7, 1941 Coelho was ordained a priest at the Cathedral of São Sebastião in Ribeirão Preto. He went on to serve as both vicar of the cathedral and curate in 1944.

== Achievements ==
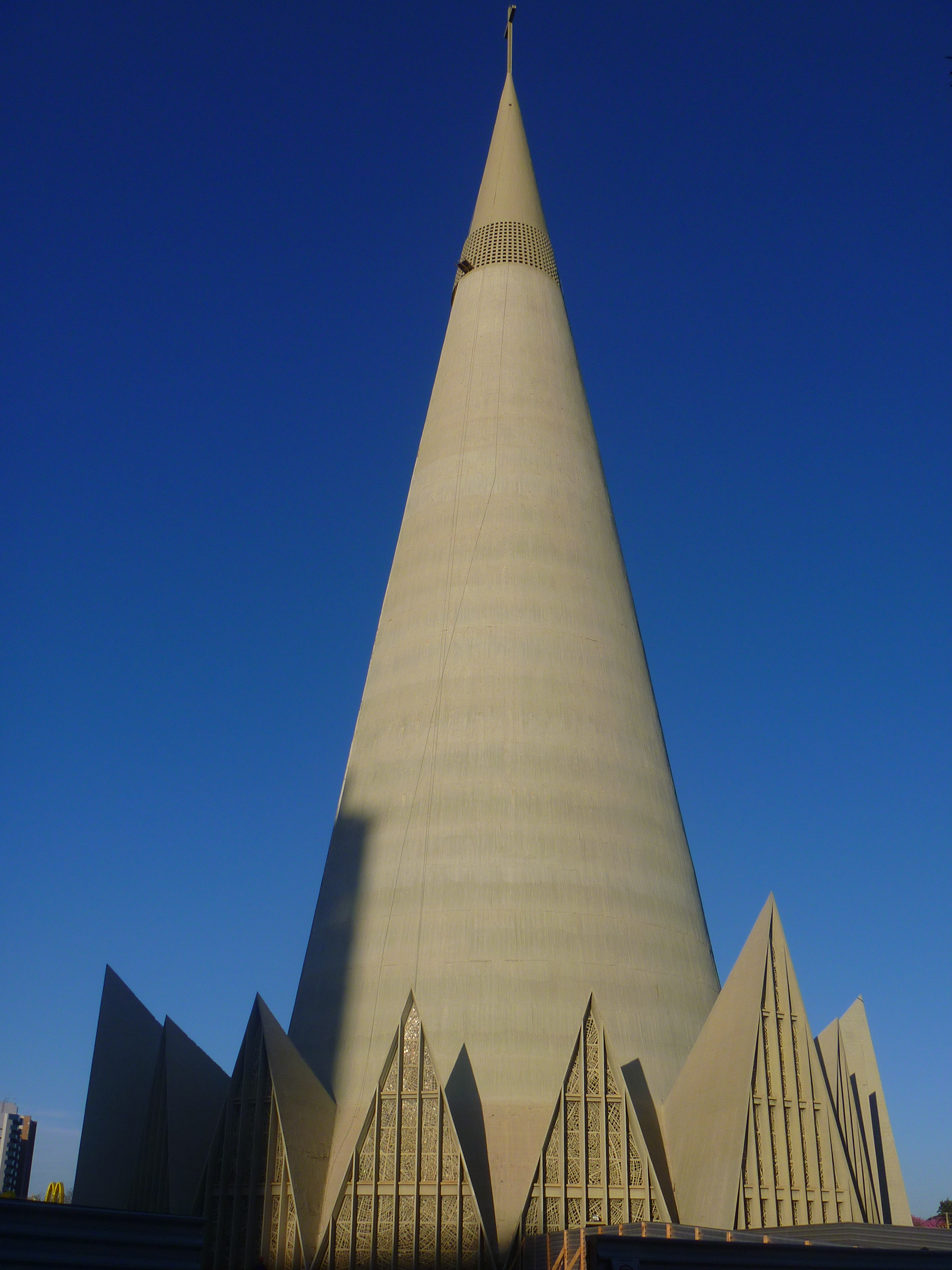
Cathedral Nossa Senhora da Glória in Maringá

On December 3, 1956 he was appointed bishop of the newly created Diocese of Maringá and was ordained on January 20, 1957. As bishop he presided over the establishment of the State College of Economics, where he taught, and which later became the University of Maringá on January 28, 1970. He initiated and oversaw the fourteen-year construction of the Cathedral Nossa Senhora da Glória (completed May 10, 1972). He was influential in constructing and later enlarging the Santa Casa de Misericórdia of Maringá, a major Catholic hospital operated by the Congregação dos Irmãos da Misericórdia de Maria Auxiliadora. He was instrumental in the creation of Paraná's major newspaper, the Folha do Norte do Paraná.

On October 16, 1979 he was appointed archbishop of the Archdiocese of Maringá by Pope John Paul II. Coelho resigned from that position on May 7, 1997, and was succeeded by Dom Murilo Sebastião Ramos Krieger.

On March 12, 2011 a biography of Coelho was published titled Pensamento Vivo de Dom Jaime Luiz Coelho, by Agnaldo Feitoza. A second biography, Jaime: Uma História de Fé e Empreendedorismo, uma Biografia de Dom Jaime Luiz Coelho, by Everton Barbosa and Luciana Peña, was published later the same year. On the occasion of his 95th birthday, July 26, 2011, a commemorative stamp was issued by the Brazilian Postal Service.

He died of complications from chronic renal failure, in Maringá on August 5, 2013.
