= Diocese of Apucarana =

Catholic ecclesiastical territory

Coordinates: 23.5516°S 51.4603°W

Diocese of Apucarana Dioecesis Apucaranensis

Catholic
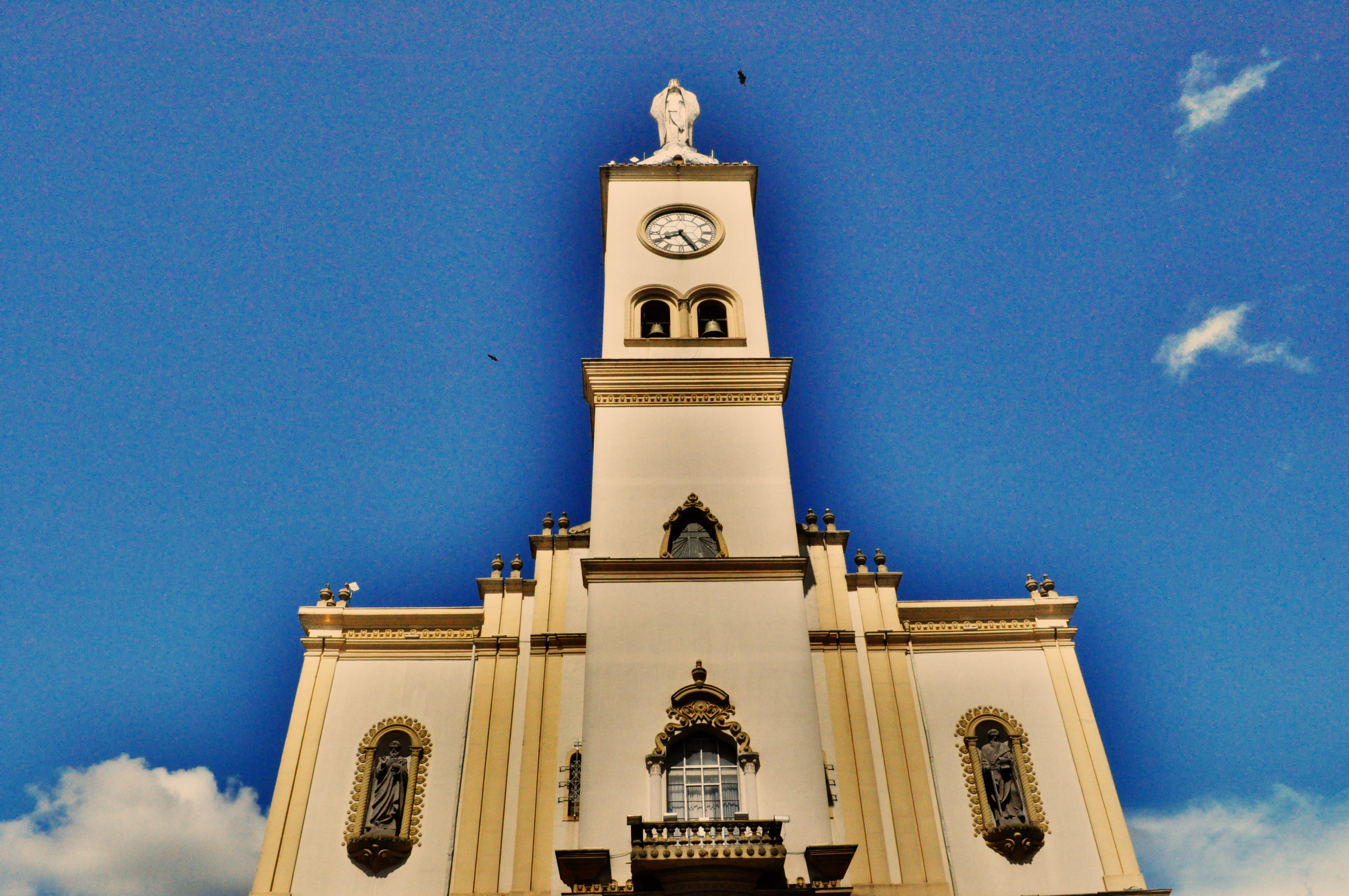
- Cathedral of Our Lady of Lourdes

Location
- Country: Brazil
- Ecclesiastical province: Londrina

Statistics
- Area: 8,655 km^{2} (3,342 sq mi)
- Population: Total; Catholics: (as of 2006); 476,000; 366,020 (76.9%)

Information
- Rite: Latin Rite
- Established: 28 November 1964 (61 years ago)
- Cathedral: Catedral de Nossa Senhora de Lourdes
- Patron saint: Our Lady of Lourdes

Current leadership
- Pope: Leo XIV
- Bishop: Carlos José de Oliveira
- Metropolitan Archbishop: Geremias Steinmetz

Website
- www.diocesedeapucarana.com.br

The Roman Catholic Diocese of Apucarana (Latin: Dioecesis Apucaranensis) is a diocese located in the city of Apucarana in the ecclesiastical province of Londrina in Brazil.

== History ==
- November 28, 1964: Established as Diocese of Apucarana from the Diocese of Campo Mourão and Diocese of Londrina
- March 4, 2024: Pope Francis declares Our Lady of Lourdes as the patroness of the Diocese of Apucarana through the Dicastery for Divine Worship and the Discipline of the Sacraments
- October 30, 2024: Pope Francis formally affixes his signature on a document conferring the diginity of Minor basilica to the diocese's Cathedral of Our Lady of Lourdes.

== Bishops ==
- Bishops of Apucarana (Latin Rite)
  - Romeu Alberti (1965.02.22 – 1982.06.03), appointed Archbishop of Ribeirão Preto, São Paulo, Brazil
  - Domingos Gabriel Wisniewski, C.M. (1983.05.17 – 2005.02.02)
  - Luiz Vicente Bernetti, O.A.D. (2005.02.02 – 2009.07.08)
  - Celso Antonio Marchiori (2009.07.08 - 2017.12.13), appointed Bishop of São José dos Pinhais, Parana
  - Carlos José de Oliveira (12.12.2018–present)

=== Other priests of this diocese who became bishops ===
- João Braz de Aviz, appointed Auxiliary Bishop of Vitória, Espirito Santo in 1994; future Cardinal
- Dirceu Vegini, appointed Auxiliary Bishop of Curitiba, Parana in 2006
