= Maimone =

Maimone is an Italian surname. Notable people with the surname include:

- José Maria Maimone (born 1932), Brazilian Roman Catholic bishop
- Monica Maimone (born 1945), Italian theatre director and playwright
- Tony Maimone (born 1952), American musician
