= Brenno Faustino =

Brazilian digital influencer and augmented reality developer

- Faustino in 2023
- Born: Brenno de Souza Faustino; December 9, 1996; Astolfo Dutra, Minas Gerais, Brazil
- Occupations: Digital influencer, augmented reality developer
- Years active: 2015–present

Brenno de Souza Faustino (born December 9, 1996), known professionally as Brenno Faustino, is a Brazilian digital influencer and augmented reality developer. He began producing content on the internet in 2015 through Snapchat and later expanded his activity to Instagram. He became known for developing augmented reality filters and effects for social media, including beauty and virtual makeup effects.

== Early life and education ==
Faustino was born in Astolfo Dutra, in the Brazilian state of Minas Gerais. At the age of 17, he moved to Juiz de Fora to pursue higher education and begin an independent life.

He studied law at Faculdades Integradas Vianna Júnior in Juiz de Fora and graduated in December 2020. Although he completed the degree, he subsequently pursued a career in digital media and augmented reality rather than practicing law.

Faustino began producing internet content in 2015, initially using Snapchat. In 2016, he expanded his activity to Instagram, transferring much of the audience he had developed on Snapchat to the platform.

In January 2021, NaTelinha reported that Faustino had more than 30,000 Instagram followers and described his development as a digital influencer and entrepreneur in Juiz de Fora.

== Career ==
Before concentrating on digital content, Faustino competed as a swimmer. In 2021, Lance! described him as a former professional swimmer and reported on his attempt to return to swimming after having stopped competing to concentrate on his studies and other activities.

His early work on social media included digital marketing and influencer campaigns. His activities subsequently expanded into the creation of augmented reality effects and filters for social media platforms.

=== Augmented reality ===
Faustino began studying augmented reality toward the end of his Law degree in 2020. He learned to develop social media filters and effects and later worked with platforms including Meta Spark Studio and Snapchat Lens Studio. In January 2022, Revista Máxima reported that Faustino had created more than 5,000 Instagram filters and had accumulated more than 60 million impressions from his work. The publication also reported that he had worked on filters with Brazilian media personalities including Gabily, Lucas Lucco, Virginia Fonseca, Munik Nunes, Hariany Almeida and Guilherme Napolitano.

His first major filter, Pele Perfeita ("Perfect Skin"), was created during the COVID-19 pandemic after he began studying augmented reality. According to Revista Máxima, the filter reached more than 36 million impressions within 24 hours of its release.

His work was also covered by g1, which reported on filters developed by Faustino for personalities including Virginia Fonseca, Gabily, Hariany Almeida and Lucas Lucco.

In January 2022, IstoÉ interviewed Faustino about the use of Instagram filters by contestants of Big Brother Brasil and their use as part of digital marketing strategies. The article discussed filters associated with contestants including Tiago Abravanel, Douglas Silva and Vyni.

In February 2024, GQ Brasil identified Faustino as an augmented reality artist and interviewed him about the use of image filters on social media. He discussed the effects of excessive use of filters and the distinction between digital editing and the natural appearance of people in photographs.

In June 2024, O Dia published an interview with Faustino about the use of augmented reality filters on Instagram and their potential role in increasing the reach of content creators and brands on the platform.

== Television ==
In June 2021, Faustino began working with TV Alterosa, a television station affiliated with SBT in Minas Gerais at the time. According to Estado de Minas, his work involved recording special promotional actions for companies during the station's programming.

His television work was also described by Hooks Magazine, which reported that he participated in the programming of TV Alterosa and produced special commercial actions for companies seeking exposure through the station.

== Media presence ==
In July 2023, g1 reported on the use of giveaways by digital influencers as a strategy for increasing follower numbers and interviewed Faustino about the practice. He discussed the need for greater regulation of promotional giveaways on social media.

In November 2024, Estado de Minas reported that Faustino had received homophobic attacks through social media. The report stated that he published the messages on his social media accounts and discussed the effects of online harassment and prejudice.

The episode was also reported by O Globo, which described the online attacks and Faustino's subsequent public response.

In May 2025, Faustino received further coverage after publishing a video discussing the popularity of reborn dolls and the debate surrounding adoption in Brazil. The episode was reported by O Globo and other Brazilian news outlets.

The same episode was covered by Terra, which reported on Faustino's discussion of the contrast between the popularity of reborn dolls and the number of children awaiting adoption in Brazil.
