= João Braz de Aviz =

Brazilian Catholic cardinal (born 1947)

His Eminence João Braz de Aviz
- Cardinal; Prefect emeritus of the Congregation for Institutes of Consecrated Life and Societies of Apostolic Life
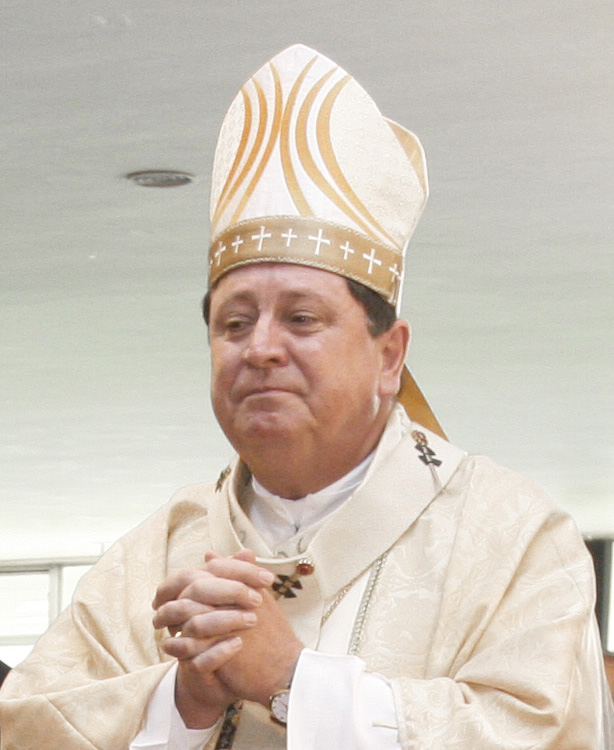
- Appointed: 4 January 2011
- Term ended: 6 January 2025
- Predecessor: Franc Rode
- Successor: Simona Brambilla (As Prefect); Angel Fernandez Artime (As Cardinal Pro-Prefect)
- Other post: Cardinal priest of Sant'Elena fuori Porta Prenestina
- Previous posts: Auxiliary Bishop of Vitória (1994–1998); Bishop of Ponta Grossa (1998–2002); Archbishop of Maringá (2002–2004); Archbishop of Brasília (2004–2011)

Orders
- Ordination: 26 November 1972 by Romeu Alberti
- Consecration: 31 May 1994 by Domingos Gabriel Wisniewski
- Created cardinal: 18 February 2012 by Pope Benedict XVI
- Rank: Cardinal deacon (2012–22); Cardinal priest (2022–present)

Personal details
- Born: João Braz de Aviz; 24 April 1947 (age 79) Mafra, Brazil
- Denomination: Roman Catholic
- Motto: Omnes Unum Sint (All May Be One)

Styles of João Braz de Aviz
- Reference style: His Eminence
- Spoken style: Your Eminence
- Religious style: Cardinal
- Informal style: Cardinal

João Braz de Aviz (Brazilian Portuguese: [ʒuˈɐ̃w ˈbɾaz dʒi aˈvis]; born 24 April 1947) is a Brazilian Catholic prelate who served as the prefect of the Congregation for Institutes of Consecrated Life and Societies of Apostolic Life from 2011 to 2025. He began his career working for 20 years as a parish priest and seminary teacher. He a bishop in 1994 and was Bishop of Ponta Grossa from 1998 to 2002, Archbishop of Maringá from 2002 to 2004, and Archbishop of Brasília from 2004 to 2011.

== Early life and education ==
Aviz was born in Mafra, Diocese of Joinville, Santa Catarina, Brazil in 1947. He has four brothers and three sisters – the youngest sister has Down syndrome. After pursuing his philosophical studies at the Major Seminary Rainha dos Apostolos in Curitiba and the Faculty of Palmas, he completed his theological studies in Rome at the Pontifical Gregorian University, where he obtained a licenciate, and at the Pontifical Lateran University, where he graduated in 1992 with a doctorate in dogmatic theology.

== Priesthood ==
Aviz was ordained a priest 26 November 1972. He began his ministry as a parish priest in the diocese of Apucarana, as Rector of the Major Seminary Apucarana and Londrina, and as professor of dogmatic theology at the Theological Institute Paul VI in Londrina. He was also member of the Council of Priests and the College of Consultors and General Coordinator of the Diocesan Pastoral Apucarana. As a young priest Aviz was once on his way to a village to say Mass when he stumbled upon an armored car robbery. He was caught in the crossfire and shot, with bullets perforating his lungs and intestines and one eye. He survived and surgeons were able to save his eye; he still carries fragments of those bullets in his body.

== Episcopate ==
On 6 April 1994, he was appointed to the titular bishop of Flenucleta as auxiliary of the Archdiocese of Vitória and received episcopal consecration on 31 May of that year. He was appointed bishop of the Roman Catholic Diocese of Ponta Grossa on 12 August 1998 by Pope John Paul II. He was promoted to archbishop of Maringá on 17 July 2002 where he served until he was appointed archbishop of Brasília on 28 January 2004. In May 2010 he organised the XVI National Eucharistic Congress, which coincided with the 50th anniversary of the city's founding.

== Roman curia ==
On 4 January 2011, Aviz, not a member of a religious order, was appointed prefect of the Congregation for Institutes of Consecrated Life and Societies of Apostolic Life. (Note: Since 1973, prelates ordained for religious orders and for dioceses have alternated in holding the post of prefect of the congregation overseeing religious in the Catholic Church. In the past 100 years, 11 of the 18 prefects did not belong to a religious order.) He is the fourth Brazilian to head a Vatican department. (Note: Others are Cardinal Agnelo Rossi, who led the Congregation for the Evangelization of Peoples from 1970 to 1984, Cardinal Lucas Moreira Neves, who headed the Congregation for Bishops from 1998 to 2000, and Cardinal Cláudio Hummes, who headed the Congregation for Clergy from 2006 to 2010.)

In February 2011, Aviz said he almost abandoned the seminary and the Catholic Church because of the ideological excesses that emerged in the early years of liberation theology. He said in an interview that "Personally, I lived with a lot of anguish during the years of the birth of liberation theology". He said he appreciated that liberation theology promoted the preferential option for the poor, which represents "the church's sincere and responsible concern for the vast phenomenon of social exclusion." He said consecrated men and women need to explore more deeply the mystery of God to strengthen their relationships with others.

In July 2011, he referred to a breakdown in trust between the Vatican and many religious orders because of "some positions taken previously", referring to his predecessor, Cardinal Franc Rode, who decried a "crisis" in religious life following the Second Vatican Council (1962–65) which he believed to have fostered excessively liberalizing currents in some communities of religious. Braz said that he recognizes there are problems, but his main aim is to "rebuild trust" by approaching issues in a new way, "without preemptive condemnations" and "by listening to people's concerns."

In his memoirs, published in 2022, Cardinal Rode recounts his astonishment at hearing of the appointment of Braz as his successor. The first to inform him of Braz was Pietro Sambi, Apostolic Nuncio to the United States. He described Braz as "un fanatico focolarino" ("a fanatic focolarino", a member of the Focolare Movement). According to Rode, the fact that a female secretary of Tarcisio Bertone, Cardinal Secretary of State, was also a fervent member of the Focolare Movement contributed to the appointment of Aviz.

Pope Benedict made him a cardinal on 18 February 2012, with the rank of Cardinal-Deacon assigned to Sant'Elena fuori Porta Prenestina. On 21 April 2012 he was appointed a member of the Congregation for the Clergy and the Congregation for Catholic Education. In the spring of 2013, he participated as a cardinal elector in the conclave that elected Pope Francis and was mentioned as a possible candidate for election to the papacy.

On 16 December 2013, Pope Francis named him a member of the Congregation for Bishops.

On 4 March 2022, he was elevated to the rank of cardinal priest.

Pope Francis appointed Sister Simona Brambilla to succeed him as prefect on 6 January 2025.

Aviz participated as a cardinal elector in the 2025 papal conclave that elected Pope Leo XIV.

== Notes ==
Catholic Church titles
Preceded by Murilo Ramos Krieger	Bishop of Ponta Grossa; 12 August 1998 – 17 July 2002	Succeeded by Sérgio Arthur Braschi
Preceded by Murilo Ramos Krieger	Archbishop of Maringá; 17 July 2002 – 28 January 2004	Succeeded by Anuar Battisti
Preceded by José Freire Falcão	Archbishop of Brasília; 28 January 2004 – 4 January 2011	Succeeded by Sérgio da Rocha
Preceded by Franc Rode	Prefect of the Congregation for Institutes of Consecrated Life and Societies of Apostolic Life; 4 January 2011 – 6 January 2025	Succeeded by Simona Brambilla
Preceded by Peter Poreku Dery	Cardinal Deacon of Sant'Elena fuori Porta Prenestina; 18 February 2012 – 4 March 2022	Succeeded by Himself as cardinal priest
Preceded by Himself as cardinal deacon	Cardinal Priest of Sant'Elena fuori Porta Prenestina; 4 March 2022 – present	Incumbent
Order of precedence
Preceded by Geraldo Alckmin as Vice President of Brazil	Brazilian order of precedence 3rd in line as Brazilian cardinal	Followed by Foreign ambassadors
