= Diocese of Cornélio Procópio =

Catholic ecclesiastical territory

Coordinates: 23.1821°S 50.6508°W

Diocese of Cornélio Procópio Dioecesis Procopiensis

Catholic
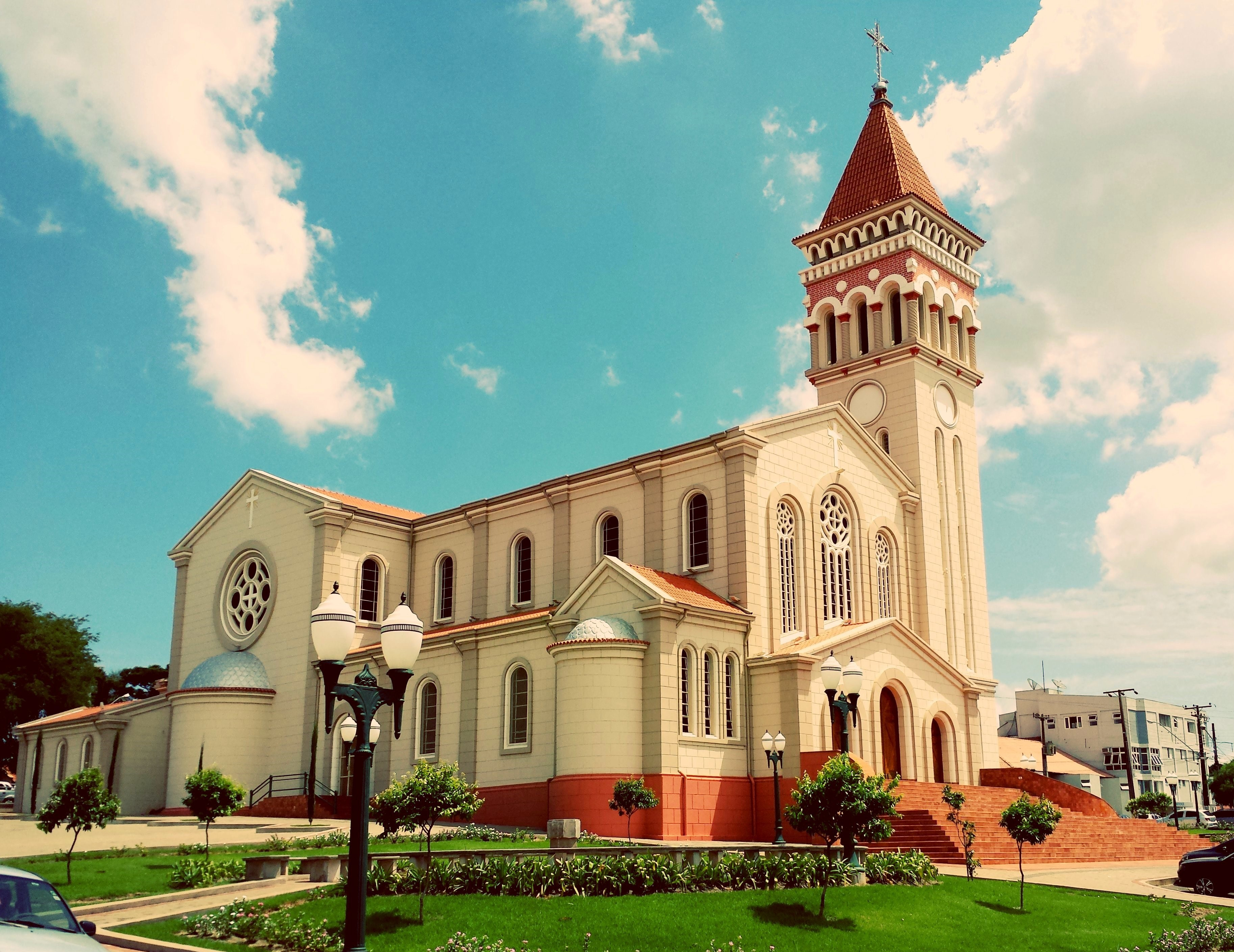
- Christ the King Cathedral

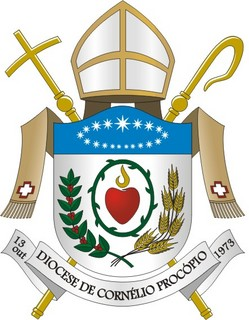
- Coat of arms

Location
- Country: Brazil
- Ecclesiastical province: Londrina

Statistics
- Area: 6,718 km^{2} (2,594 sq mi)
- Population: Total; Catholics: (as of 2005); 198,055; 156,988 (79.3%)

Information
- Rite: Latin Rite
- Established: 26 May 1973 (53 years ago)
- Cathedral: Catedral Cristo Rei

Current leadership
- Pope: Leo XIV
- Bishop: Marcos José dos Santos
- Metropolitan Archbishop: Geremias Steinmetz
- Bishops emeritus: Manoel João Francisco

The Roman Catholic Diocese of Cornélio Procópio (Latin: Dioecesis Procopiensis) is a diocese located in the city of Cornélio Procópio in the ecclesiastical province of Londrina in Brazil.

== History ==
- May 26, 1973: Established as Diocese of Cornélio Procópio from the Diocese of Jacarezinho

== Bishops ==
- Bishops of Cornélio Procópio (Roman rite), in reverse chronological order
  - Bishop Marcos José dos Santos (2022.06.22 – present)
  - Bishop Manoel João Francisco (2014.03.26 – 2022.06.22)
  - Bishop Getúlio Teixeira Guimarães, S.V.D. (1984.03.26 – 2014.03.26)
  - Bishop Domingos Gabriel Wisniewski, C.M. (1979.04.19 – 1983.05.17)
  - Bishop José Joaquim Gonçalves (1973.06.14 – 1979.03.28)

=== Other priests of this diocese who became bishops ===
- Sérgio de Deus Borges, appointed Auxiliary Bishop of São Paulo in 2012
- Aparecido Donizete de Souza, appointed Auxiliary Bishop of Porto Alegre, Rio Grande do Sul in 2015
