= Octabia =

Ancient city

Africa Proconsularis (125 AD)

Octaba was an ancient Roman–Berber city in the province of Africa Proconsularis and Byzacena in late antiquity. Its exact location is now lost, but it was in the Sahel region of Tunisia. In 484AD the town's Catholic bishop, Sabinico, attended a synod in Carthage called by the Arian king Huneric, the Vandal. At the conclusion of that synod, Sabinico was sent into exile by the king.

Today Octabia survives only as a titular bishopric of the Roman Catholic Church.

== Bishops of Octabia ==
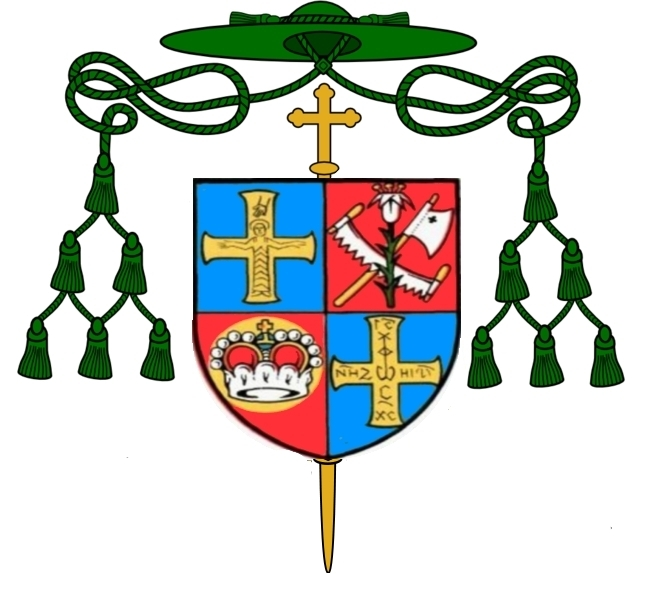
Coat of arms of the titular bishop of Octabia

- Sabinico (fl. 484)
- Antônio Mazzarotto (1965–1971)
- Josef Vrana (1973–1987)
- Paul Stephen Loverde (1988–1993)
- Luciano Bergamin,(2000–2002)
- Donald Lapointe, (2002–current)
