= Antônio Mazzarotto =

Roman Catholic bishop from Brazil

- Bishop of Ponta Grossa
- Church: Catholic Church
- Diocese: Diocese of Ponta Grossa
- In office: 16 December 1929 – 20 March 1965
- Predecessor: Diocese erected
- Successor: Geraldo Pellanda
- Other post: Titular Bishop of Octabia (1965-1971)
- Previous post: Apostolic Administrator of Palmas (1934-1947)

Orders
- Ordination: 23 November 1914 by João Francisco Braga
- Consecration: 23 February 1930 by Enrico Gasparri

Personal details
- Born: 1 September 1890 Santa Felicidade, Curitiba, Paraná, Brazil
- Died: 15 July 1980 (aged 89)

Antônio Mazzarotto (born 1 September 1890 in Santa Felicidade, Curitiba, Brazil, died 15 July 1980) was a Brazilian clergyman and Roman Catholic bishop of Ponta Grossa.

== Life ==
On 23 November 1914 Antônio Mazzarotto received the sacrament of priestly ordination. On 16 December 1929 Pope Pius XI appointed him the first bishop of the Ponta Grossa diocese, which had been created in 1926. The Apostolic Nuncio in Brazil, Cardinal Enrico Gasparri, gave him the bishop's ordination on 23 February the following year; Co-consecrators were Archbishop Francesco Cherubini, emeritus nuncio in Yugoslavia, and Ignacy Maria Dobowski, emeritus Bishop of Lutsk.

He took part in the first session of the Second Vatican Council as a councilor. Already in November 1960, he was given a coadjutor with Geraldo Micheletto Pellanda.

On 20 March 1965 Pope Paul VI. accepted his resignation and appointed him the titular bishop of Octabia. On 16 March 1971 he renounced his titular position on the basis of the amended guidelines, with his title now being Bishop Emeritus of Ponta Grossa.

== See also ==
- Catholic Church in Brazil
