= Sacred Heart of Jesus Cathedral, Londrina =

Coordinates: 23.3122°S 51.1597°W

Sacred Heart of Jesus Cathedral
- Catedral Metropolitana Sagrado Coração de Jesus
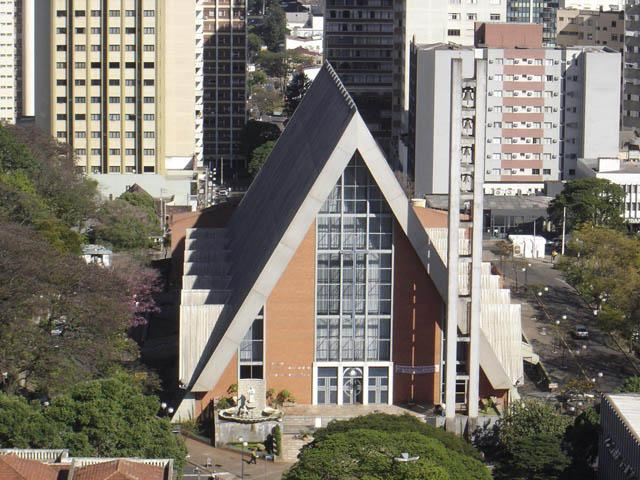
- Sacred Heart of Jesus Cathedral
- Location: Londrina
- Country: Brazil
- Denomination: Roman Catholic Church

Administration
- Archdiocese: Londrina

The Sacred Heart of Jesus Cathedral (Portuguese: Catedral Metropolitana Sagrado Coração de Jesus) or Londrina Cathedral is a religious building belonging to the Catholic Church in the center of the city of Londrina, in northern Paraná state in the South American country of Brazil.

Built in wood, at the highest point of the earth used to house the city of Londrina, the second church of the city was built based on the designs of engineer Willie Davids, which was inaugurated on August 19, 1934. In 1937, designed a project in neogothic style by the engineer Fristch. In 1938 construction began with the laying of the first stone, and was completed in 1941, the most recent addition being made in 1951 with the placement of the clock tower. In 1953, due to the need for a bigger vision was commissioned a new project the German engineer Freckmann. The new church began with the works in 1954. In 1962 the work was stopped for financial reasons. It was only resumed in 1966 through a new project by architects Eduardo Rosso and Yoshimasi Kimati. It was finally inaugurated on December 17, 1972.

== See also ==
- Roman Catholicism in Brazil
- Sacred Heart of Jesus Cathedral
