= Rubens Augusto de Souza Espínola =

Rubens Augusto de Souza Espínola (8 June 1928 – 28 December 2017) was a Brazilian Roman Catholic bishop.

De Souza Espínola was ordained to the priesthood in 1963. He served as auxiliary bishop of the Roman Catholic Diocese of São San Luìs de Montes Belos, Brazil from 1980 to 1985. He then served as Bishop of the Diocese of Paranavaí from 1985 to 2003.
