= Luiz Vicente Bernetti =

Italian priest (1934–2017)

Luiz Vicente Bernetti O.A.D.
- Bishop of Apucarana
- Church: Catholic Church
- Diocese: Diocese of Apucarana
- In office: 2 February 2005 – 8 July 2009
- Predecessor: Domingos Gabriel Wisniewski
- Successor: Celso Antônio Marchiori
- Previous posts: Titular Bishop of Rufiniana (1996-2005); Auxiliary Bishop of Palmas–Francisco Beltrão (1996-2005)

Orders
- Ordination: 1 June 1958
- Consecration: 25 August 1996 by Agostinho José Sartori

Personal details
- Born: 24 March 1934 Ponzano di Fermo, Province of Ascoli Piceno, Kingdom of Italy
- Died: 11 August 2017 (aged 83) Bom Jardim, Rio de Janeiro, Brazil

Luis Vicente Bernetti (24 March 1934 – 11 August 2017) was a Catholic bishop.

Ordained to the priesthood in 1958, Bernetti served as auxiliary bishop of the Catholic Diocese of Palmas-Francisco Belrão, Brazil, from 1996 to 2005. He then served as bishop of the Roman Catholic Diocese of Apucarana, Brazil, from 2005 to 2009.
