= Stříbrnice (Přerov District) =

- Municipality
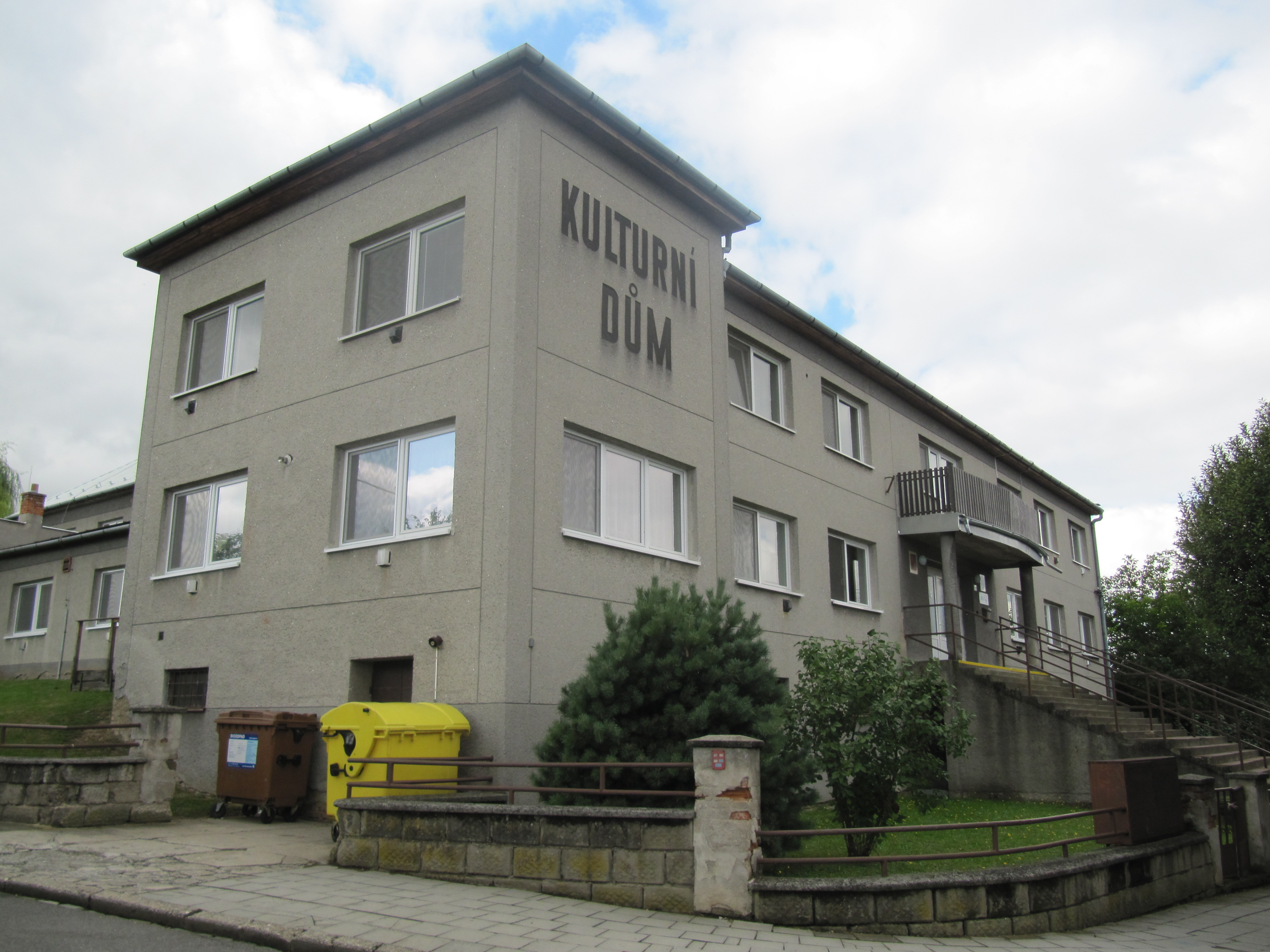
- Municipal office

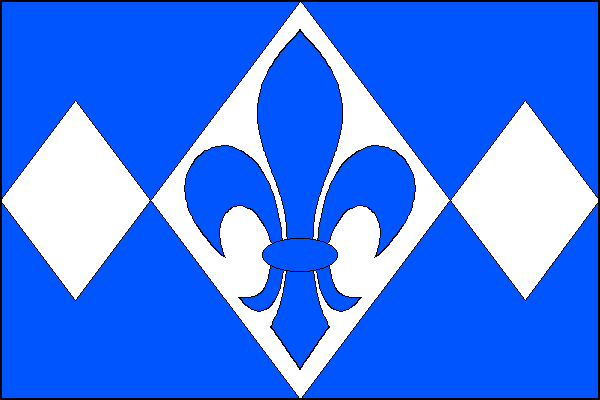
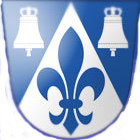
- Flag Coat of arms

- Location in the Czech Republic
- Coordinates: 49°19′42″N 17°14′46″E
- Country: Czech Republic
- Region: Olomouc
- District: Přerov
- First mentioned: 1406

Area
  - Total: 2.27 km^{2} (0.88 sq mi)
- Elevation: 207 m (679 ft)

Population (2026-01-01)
  - Total: 234
  - Density: 103/km^{2} (267/sq mi)
- Time zone: UTC+1 (CET)
  - Summer (DST): UTC+2 (CEST)
- Postal code: 752 01
- Website: www.obecstribrnice.cz

Stříbrnice is a municipality and village in Přerov District in the Olomouc Region of the Czech Republic. It has about 300 inhabitants.

Stříbrnice lies approximately 21 kilometres (13 mi) south-west of Přerov, 30 km (19 mi) south of Olomouc, and 221 km (137 mi) south-east of Prague.

== Demographics ==
Historical population
Year	Pop.	±%
1869	209	—
1880	230	+10.0%
1890	236	+2.6%
1900	254	+7.6%
1910	313	+23.2%
1921	313	+0.0%
1930	334	+6.7%
1950	310	−7.2%
1961	340	+9.7%
1970	325	−4.4%
1980	300	−7.7%
1991	253	−15.7%
2001	244	−3.6%
2011	244	+0.0%
2021	236	−3.3%
Source: Censuses

== Notable people ==
- Josef Vrana (1905–1987), Roman Catholic bishop
