= Josef Vrana =

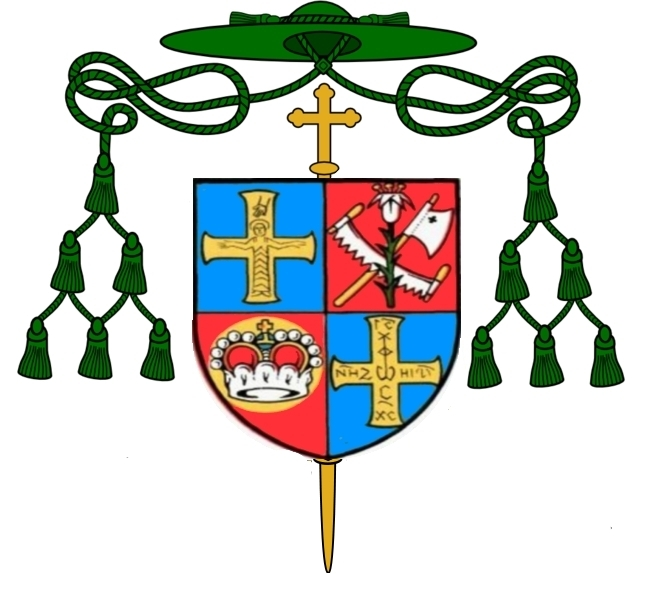
Coat of arms of the Titular bishop of Octabia

Josef Vrana (17 October 1905 in Stříbrnice – 30 November 1987 in Olomouc) was the administrator of the archbishopric of Olomouc, as well as titular bishop of Octabia.

== Life ==
After the death of the interned archbishop of Olomouc, Josef Karel Matocha In 1961, the Czechoslovak authorities refused to accept a new bishop candidate (František Vaňák) proposed by the Holy See. Finally, Josef Vrana was appointed an administrator on 19 February 1973.

The position of Vrana was controversially discussed. In order to avoid worse controversy, the Vatican accepted his appointment and appointed him at the same time to the titular bishop of Octabia. Nevertheless, the Church had no confidence in him, and avoided mentioning him as a "bishop of Olomouc," as the state authorities have demanded.

In the episcopal conference of which he was a member, Vrana was supposed to push through the state's requirements and expectations. Nevertheless, he has also endeavored to fulfill his duties as a bishop. Neither his bishop's colleague nor the faithful who saw him as a traitor trusted him. On the part of the state authorities he was awarded an award, but at the same time he was also mistrusted, For example, his office and his telephone calls were monitored.

Vrana was buried in the Fürstenbergkapelle of Saint Wenceslas Cathedral, where an epitaph records him.
