= Sant'Elena, Rome =

Church in Rome, Italy

Coordinates: 41.8873°N 12.5263°E

Chiesa di Sant'Elena
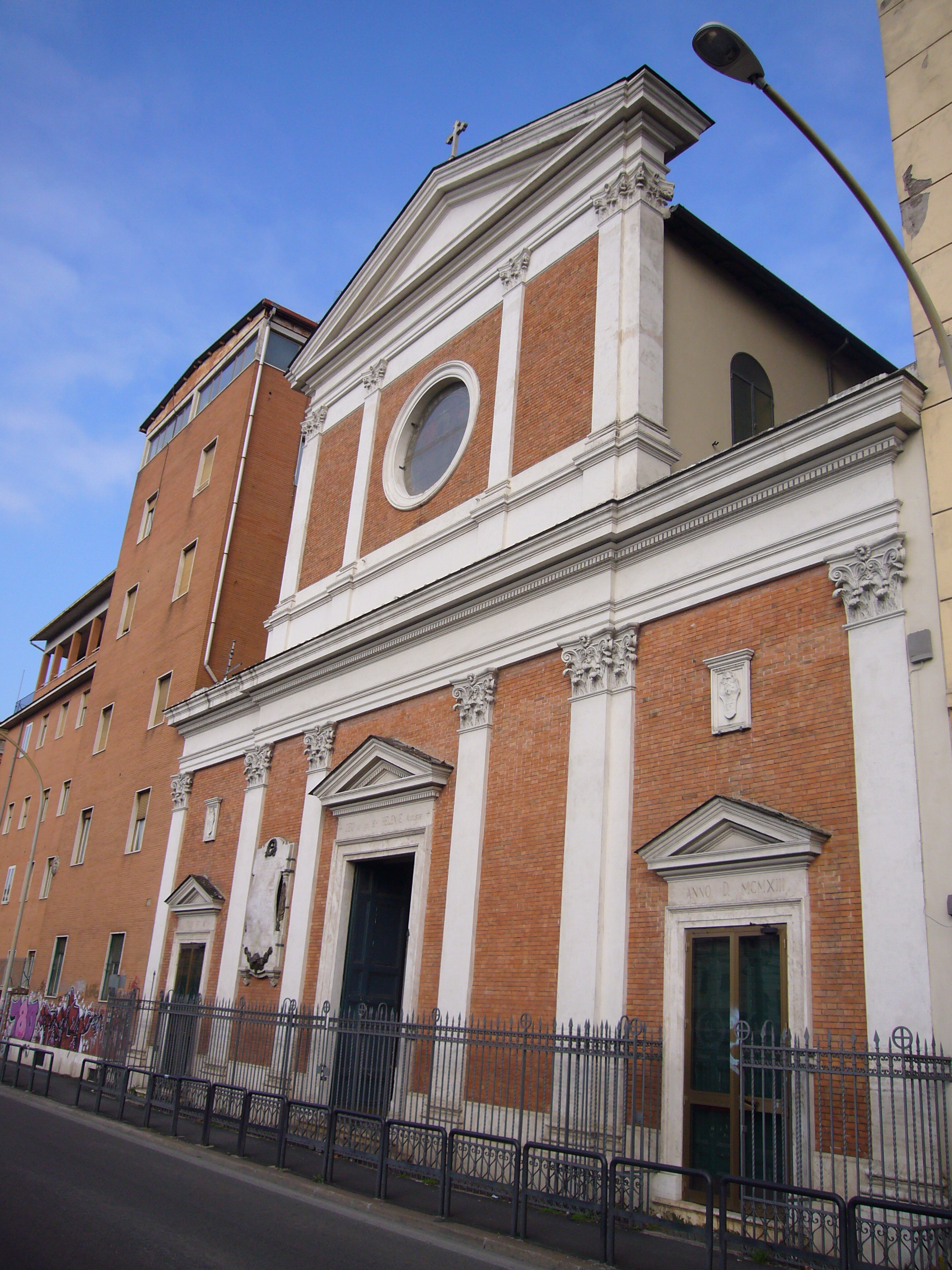
- Sant'Elena, the façade

Religion
- Affiliation: Catholic
- Rite: Latin
- Year consecrated: 1916

Location
- Location: Rome, Italy
- State: ITA
- Interactive map of Chiesa di Sant'Elena

Architecture
- Groundbreaking: 1913
- Completed: 1914

Website
- parrocchiasantelena.it

Sant'Elena or Sant'Elena fuori Porta Prenestina is a church in Rome (Italy), in the Prenestino-Labicano Quarter, facing on Via Casilina.

== History ==
The church was built by Pope Pius X as a memorial of the 16th centenary of the Edict of Milan (313), when Roman Emperors Constantine I and Licinius acknowledged Christianity as a licit and lawful religion within the Empire; it was dedicated to Constantine's mother, Helena. The church – based on a design by the architect Giuseppe Palombi – was built between 1913 and 1914, opened to worship on 2 April 1914 and was consecrated on 17 September 1916.

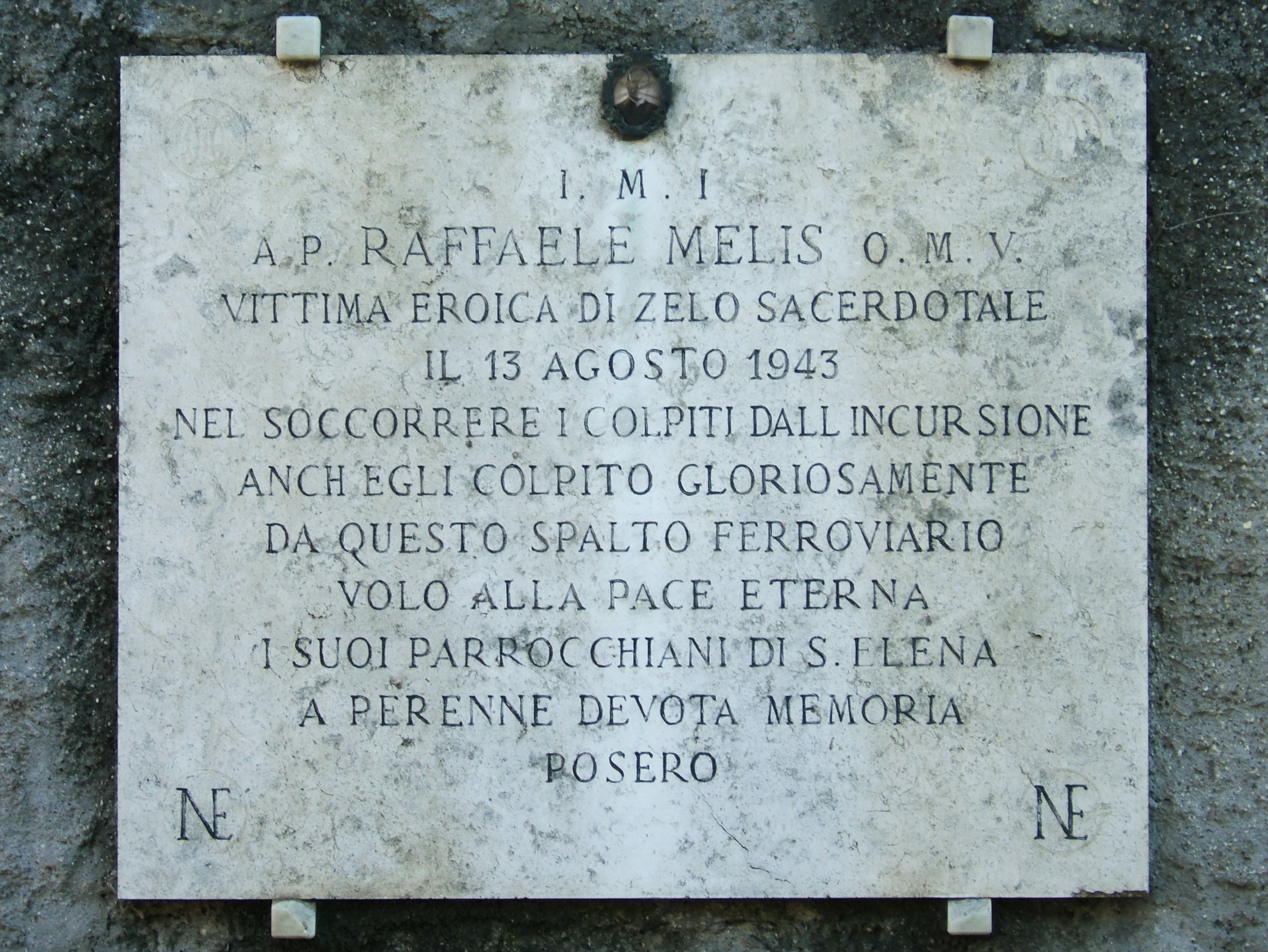
The plaque commemorating Raffaele Melis in Via del Mandrione.

The church rises in the so-called Quarto di Sant'Elena ("Quarter of St. Helen"), mentioned into documents dating back to the last years of the 14th century. An act by notary A. Scambi dated 10 May 1379 refers to an eight-rubbi (14,7 hectares) vineyard placed "in quartum qui dicitur sancta Erina". The prior of the cloister of Santa Maria Nova, on 15 October 1382, sold the fruits from the "terre da sancta Helena" ("lands of St. Helen") through an administrative deed by the Roman notary Venettini. St. Helen's estate bordered on the hamlet of St. John Lateran and on the hamlet of Santa Croce in Gerusalemme. On 25 November 1424 the cloister of Santa Maria Nova sold to the Lateran Chapter a plot of 25 rubbi (46,2 hectares) through a deed by the Roman notary Nardo Venettini (Arch. Cap., Sez. I, t. 785 bis, vol. 10 f. 186).

The edifice received the title of Parish Church on 19 March 1914 by Pope Pius X, through the apostolic constitution "Quod iam pridem", thus receiving the rights and incomes of the suppressed Parish of Santi Quirico e Giulitta in the Forum of Augustus. Since 1985 it is a titular church with the name "Sant'Elena fuori Porta Prenestina".

On the railway protective wall, close to the crossing between Via del Mandrione and via Casilina, a travertine cross commemorates the vicar Raffaele Melis, killed on 13 August 1943 by the second bombing of Rome – that struck the train of the former Rome–Fiuggi railway, full of people repatriating from Africa – while giving aid to wounded people.

== Cardinal Deans ==
- Edouard Gagnon, P.S.S. (May 25, 1985 - January 29, 1996 appointed Cardinal Priest of San Marcello)
- Peter Poreku Dery (March 24, 2006 - March 6, 2008 deceased)
- João Braz de Aviz (February 18, 2012 - March 4, 2022); title pro hac vice from March 4, 2022

== Bibliography ==
- C. Rendina, Le Chiese di Roma, Newton & Compton Editori, Milan 2000, p. 96–97
- Severino, Carmelo G. (2005). ROMA MOSAICO URBANO. Il Pigneto fuori Porta Maggiore. Rome: Gangemi. ISBN 978-88-492-0926-6.
- G. Carpaneto, Quartiere VII. Prenestino-Labicano, in VV.AA, I quartieri di Roma, Newton & Compton Editori, Rome 2006
