= Domingos Gabriel Wisniewski =

Brazilian Roman Catholic prelate and bishop

Domingos Gabriel Wisniewski CM
- Bishop of Apucarana
- Church: Catholic Church
- Diocese: Diocese of Apucarana
- In office: 17 May 1983 – 2 February 2005
- Predecessor: Romeu Alberti
- Successor: Luiz Vicente Bernetti
- Previous posts: Bishop of Cornélio Procópio (1979-1983); Titular Bishop of Tela (1975-1979); Auxiliary Bishop of Curitiba (1975-1979)

Orders
- Ordination: 29 June 1955
- Consecration: 28 August 1975 by Carmine Rocco

Personal details
- Born: 2 March 1928 Guarani das Missões, São Pedro do Rio Grande do Sul, Brazil
- Died: 21 July 2010 (aged 82)

Domingos Gabriel Wisniewski CM (March 2, 1928 – July 21, 2010) was a Brazilian Roman Catholic prelate and bishop of the Roman Catholic Diocese of Apucarana, Brazil.
