= Santa Felicidade neighborhood =

Coordinates: 25°24′30″S 49°19′42″W

Santa Felicidade is one neighborhood of the city of Curitiba, Paraná, Brazil.

The Santa Felicidade neighborhood came into being in 1878, when the first Italian immigrants arrived in Paraná. Today it is famous for its many fine restaurants where typical Italian food is served.

Besides good food, visitors and tourists have great attractions such as:

- House of geraniums;

- House Culpi.

Two secular buildings and typical of Italian immigrants.

The neighborhood is a tribute to the Portuguese woman Felicidade Borges.

== Bibliography ==
Carlos Renato Fernandes (1988). O Paraná. Curitiba: Government of Paraná. pp. 227p.
