= Diocese of São Luís de Montes Belos =

Catholic ecclesiastical territory

Diocese of São Luís de Montes Belos Dioecesis Sancti Aloisii de Montes Belos

Catholic

Location
- Country: Brazil
- Ecclesiastical province: Goiânia

Statistics
- Area: 42,671 km^{2} (16,475 sq mi)
- Population: Total; Catholics: (as of 2004); 294,008; 207,283 (70.5%)

Information
- Sui iuris church: Latin Church
- Rite: Roman Rite
- Established: 25 November 1961 (64 years ago)
- Cathedral: Catedral São Luís Gonzaga

Current leadership
- Pope: Leo XIV
- Bishop: Lindomar Rocha Mota
- Bishops emeritus: Carmelo Scampa

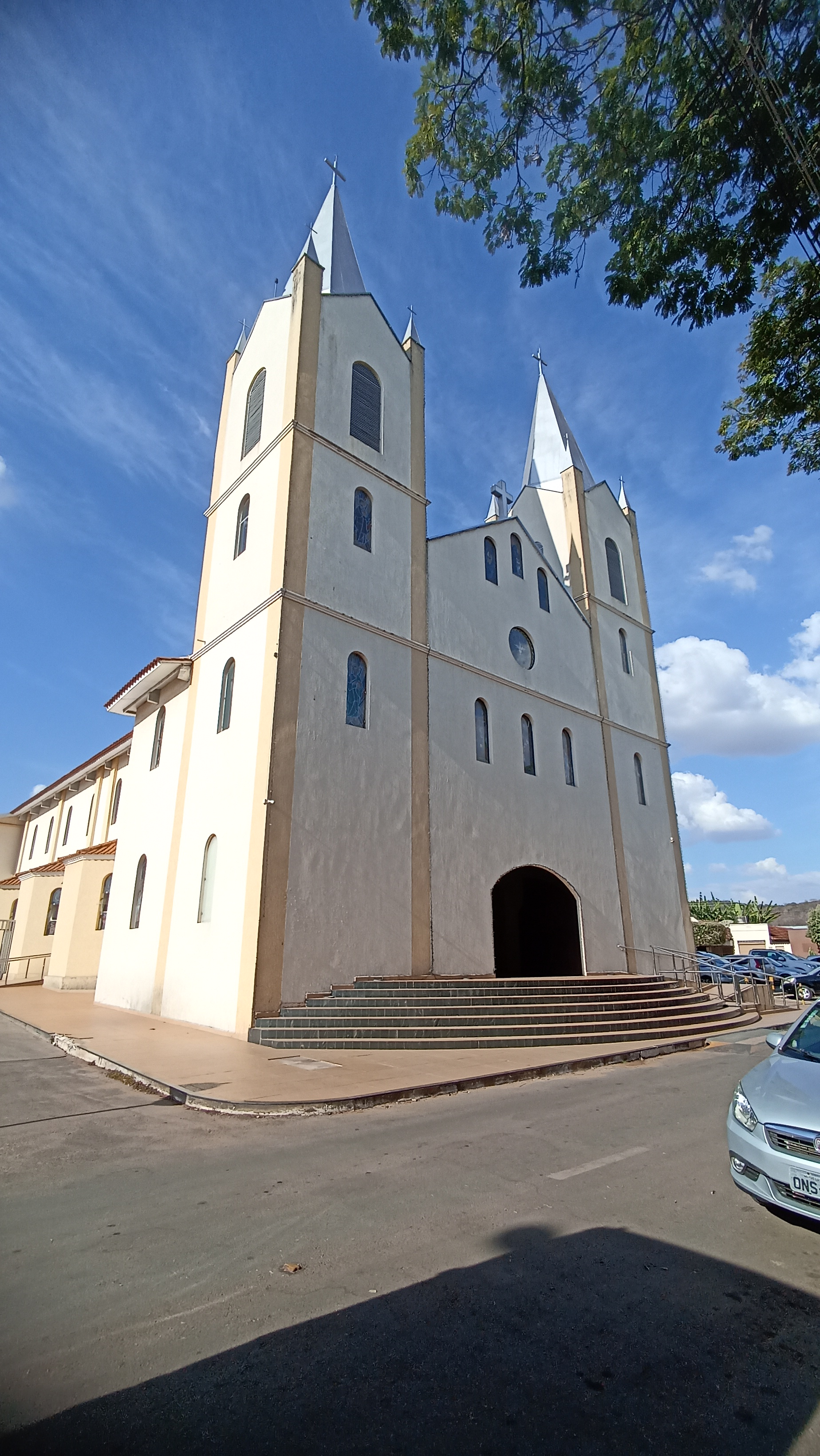
Façade if the Paróquia Catedral São Luiz Gonzaga

The Roman Catholic Diocese of São Luís de Montes Belos (Latin: Dioecesis Sancti Aloisii de Montes Belos) is a diocese centred on the city of São Luís de Montes Belos and part of the ecclesiastical province of Goiânia in Brazil.

== History ==
It was established as the Territorial Prelature of São Luís de Montes Belos on 25 November 1961 with territory taken from the Metropolitan Archdiocese of Goiânia, the Diocese of Goiás and the Diocese of Jataí, and was entrusted to the Dutch members of the Passionist religious institute.

It became the Diocese of São Luís de Montes Belos on 4 August 1981.

== Bishops ==
=== Ordinaries ===
- Prelate of São Luís de Montes Belos (Latin Church)
  - Estanislau Arnoldo van Melis, C.P. (1962.11.26 – 1981.08.04); see below
- Bishops of São Luís de Montes Belos (Latin Church)
  - Estanislau Arnoldo van Melis, C.P. (1981.08.04 – 1987.02.10); see above
  - Washington Cruz, C.P. (1987.02.10 – 2002.05.08), appointed Archbishop of Goiânia, Goias
  - Carmelo Scampa (2002.10.30 – 2020.01.22)
  - Lindomar Rocha Mota (2020.01.22 -)

=== Auxiliary bishop ===
- Rubens Augusto de Souza Espínola (1980-1985), appointed Bishop of Paranavaí, Parana
