= Diocese of Ponta Grossa =

Catholic ecclesiastical territory

Diocese of Ponta Grossa Dioecesis Ponta Grossa Diocese de Ponta Grossa
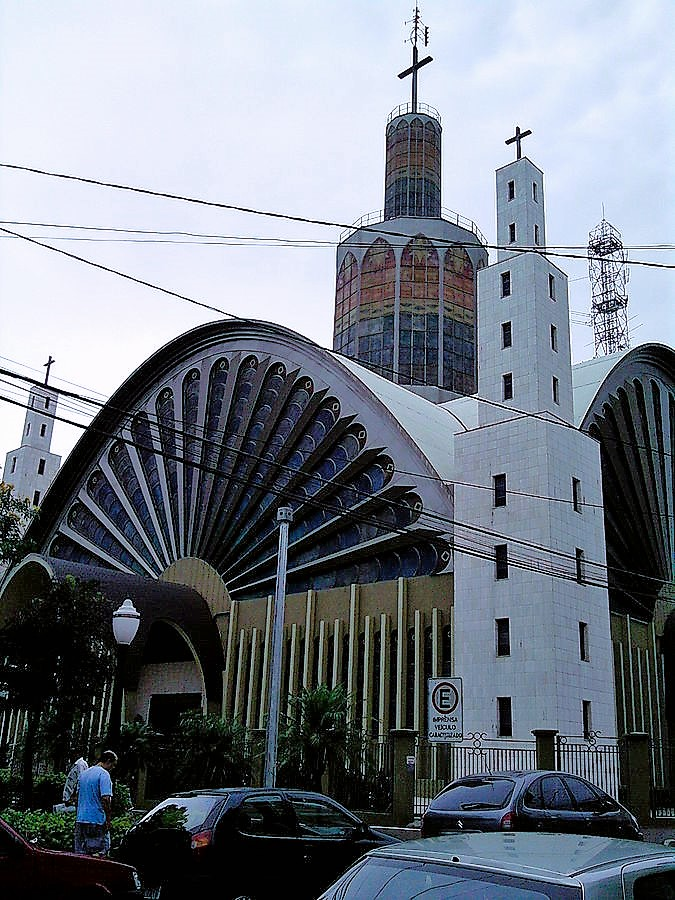
- Cathedral of St. Ann

Location
- Country: Brazil
- Ecclesiastical province: Curitiba
- Metropolitan: Curitiba

Statistics
- Area: 23,462 km^{2} (9,059 sq mi)
- Population: Total; Catholics: (as of 2004); 643,339; 546,838 (85.0%)

Information
- Denomination: Catholic Church
- Rite: Latin Rite
- Established: 10 May 1926 (99 years ago)
- Cathedral: Cathedral of St Anne in Ponta Grossa

Current leadership
- Pope: Leo XIV
- Bishop: Bruno Elizeu Versari
- Metropolitan Archbishop: José Antônio Peruzzo
- Bishops emeritus: Sérgio Arthur Braschi

Website
- www.diocesepontagrossa.com.br

The Diocese of Ponta Grossa (Latin: Dioecesis Ponta Grossa) is a territorial division of the Catholic Church in the state of Paraná, Brazil. It was created in 1926 by Papal bull Quum in Dies Numerus of Pope Pius XI, with bula Quum in numerus. It is a suffragan diocese of Archdiocese of Curitiba. The fifth and current Diocesan Bishop is Bishop Sergio Arthur Braschi.

== Bishops ==
- Antônio Mazzarotto (1929 – 1965)
- Geraldo Luis Claudio Micheleto Pellanda, C.P. (1965 – 1991)
- Murilo Sebastian Ramos Krieger, S.C.I. (1991 – 1998), appointed Archbishop of Maringá, Parana
- Joao Braz de Aviz (1998 – 2003), appointed Archbishop of Maringá, Parana; future Cardinal
- Sérgio Arthur Braschi (2003 – 2024)
- Bruno Elizeu Versari (2024 – Present)

It is the largest centre of vocations throughout the Paraná, responsible for 40% of all priests present in Parana.

=== Coadjutor bishop ===
- Geraldo Claudio Luiz Micheletto Pellanda, C.P. (1960-1965)

=== Auxiliary bishops ===
- Getúlio Teixeira Guimarães, S.V.D. (1980-1984), appointed Bishop of Cornélio Procópio, Parana
- José Alves da Costa, D.C. (1986-1991), appointed Bishop of Corumbá, Mato Grosso do Sul

=== Other priests of this diocese who became bishops ===
- Francisco Carlos Bach, appointed Bishop of Toledo, Parana in 2005
- Mário Spaki, appointed Bishop of Paranavaí, Parana in 2018

== Cities ==
The Diocese of Ponta Grossa is composed of 13 cities: Carambeí, Castro, Imbituva, Ipiranga, Ponta Grossa, Telêmaco Borba, Ortigueira, Reserva, Tibagi, Ivaí, Piraí do Sul, Teixeira Soares, Fernandes Pinheiro, Ventania, Irati, Guamiranga, and Imbaú.
