= Diocese of Umuarama =

Catholic ecclesiastical territory in Brazil

Diocese of Umuarama Dioecesis Umuaramensis

Catholic

Location
- Country: Brazil
- Ecclesiastical province: Maringá

Statistics
- Area: 13,200 km^{2} (5,100 sq mi)
- Population: Total; Catholics: (as of 2004); 364,536; 296,014 (81.2%)

Information
- Rite: Latin Rite
- Established: 26 May 1973 (53 years ago)
- Cathedral: Catedral Divino Espírito Santo

Current leadership
- Pope: Leo XIV
- Bishop: João Mamede Filho
- Bishops emeritus: José Maria Maimone

Website
- www.diocesedeumuarama.org.br

The Roman Catholic Diocese of Umuarama (Latin: Dioecesis Umuaramensis) is a diocese located in the city of Umuarama in the ecclesiastical province of Maringá in Brazil.

== History ==
- 26 May 1973: Established as Diocese of Umuarama from the Diocese of Campo Mourão

== Bishops ==
- Bishops of Umuarama (Roman rite)
  - José Maria Maimone, S.A.C. (12 June 1973 - 8 May 2002) Resigned
  - Vicente Costa (9 October 2002 - 30 December 2009) appointed, Bishop of Jundiaí, São Paulo
  - João Mamede Filho, O.F.M. Conv. (24 November 2010 – present)

=== Coadjutor bishop ===
- Frederico Heimler, S.D.B. (1998-2002), did not succeed to see; appointed Bishop of Cruz Alta, Rio Grande do Sul
