= Diocese of Jundiaí =

Catholic ecclesiastical territory

Coordinates: 23.1889°S 46.8844°W

Diocese of Jundiaí Dioecesis Iundiaiensis

Catholic
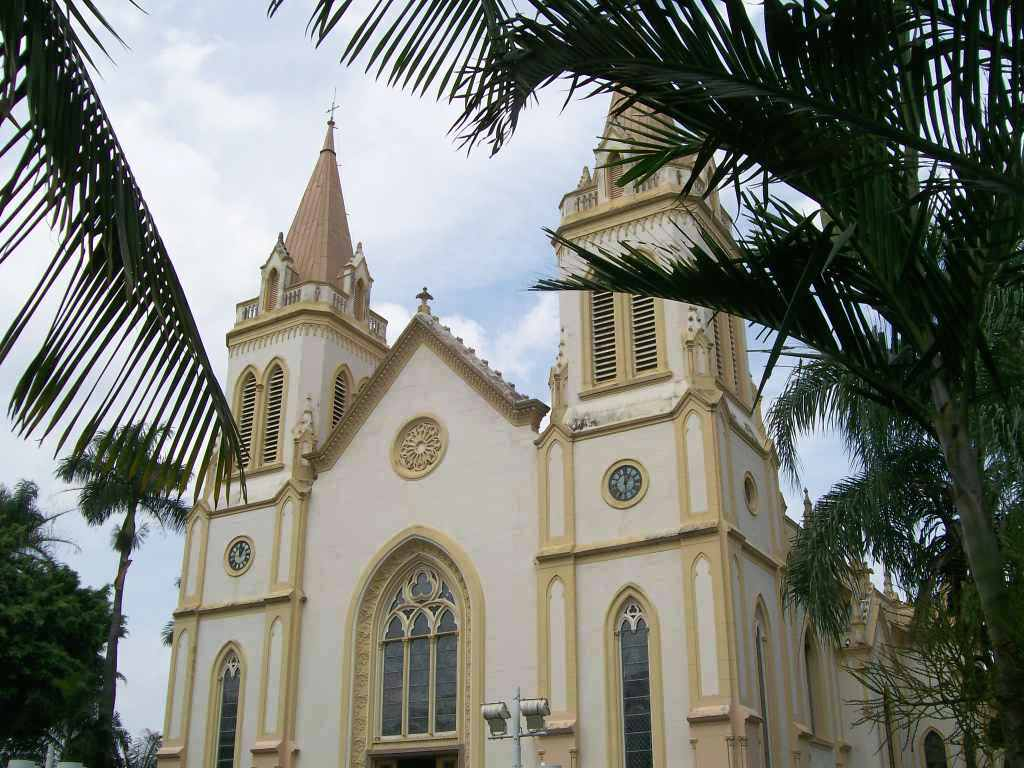
- Cathedral of Our Lady of Exile

Location
- Country: Brazil
- Ecclesiastical province: Sorocaba
- Metropolitan: Sorocaba

Statistics
- Area: 2,262 km^{2} (873 sq mi)
- Population: Total; Catholics: (as of 2011); 1,155,000; 980,000 (84.8%)

Information
- Rite: Latin Rite
- Established: 7 November 1966 (59 years ago)
- Cathedral: Catedral Nossa Senhora do Desterro
- Patron saint: Nossa Senhora do Desterro

Current leadership
- Pope: Leo XIV
- Bishop: Arnaldo Carvalheiro Neto
- Metropolitan Archbishop: Júlio Endi Akamine, S.A.C.
- Bishops emeritus: Vicente Costa

Website
- Website of the Diocese

The Roman Catholic Diocese of Jundiaí (Latin: Dioecesis Iundiaiensis) is a diocese located in the city of Jundiaí in the ecclesiastical province of Sorocaba in Brazil.

== History ==
- 7 November 1966: Established as Diocese of Jundiaí from the Metropolitan Archdiocese of Campinas and Metropolitan Archdiocese of São Paulo

== Bishops ==
- Bishops of Jundiaí (Roman rite)
  - BIshop Arnaldo Carvalheiro Neto (15 June 2022 – present)
  - Bishop Vicente Costa (30 December 2009 – 15 June 2022)
  - Bishop Gil Antônio Moreira (7 January 2004 – 28 January 2009), appointed Archbishop of Juiz de Fora, Minas Gerais
  - Bishop Amaury Castanho (2 October 1996 – 7 January 2004)
  - Bishop Roberto Pinarello de Almeida (11 March 1982 – 2 October 1996)
  - Bishop Gabriel Paulino Bueno Couto, O. Carm. (21 November 1966 – 11 March 1982)

=== Coadjutor bishops ===
- Roberto Pinarello de Almeida (1980–1982)
- Amaury Castanho (1989–1996)

=== Auxiliary bishop ===
- Roberto Pinarello de Almeida (1971–1980), appointed Coadjutor here

=== Other priests of this diocese who became bishops ===
- Joaquim Justino Carreira, appointed Auxiliary Bishop of São Paulo in 2005
- Joaquim Wladimir Lopes Dias, appointed Auxiliary Bishop of Vitória, Espirito Santo in 2011
