= Cathedral of Maringá =

Roman Catholic cathedral in Brazil

Coordinates: 23°25′35″S 51°56′18″W

Catedral Basílica Menor Nossa Senhora da Glória
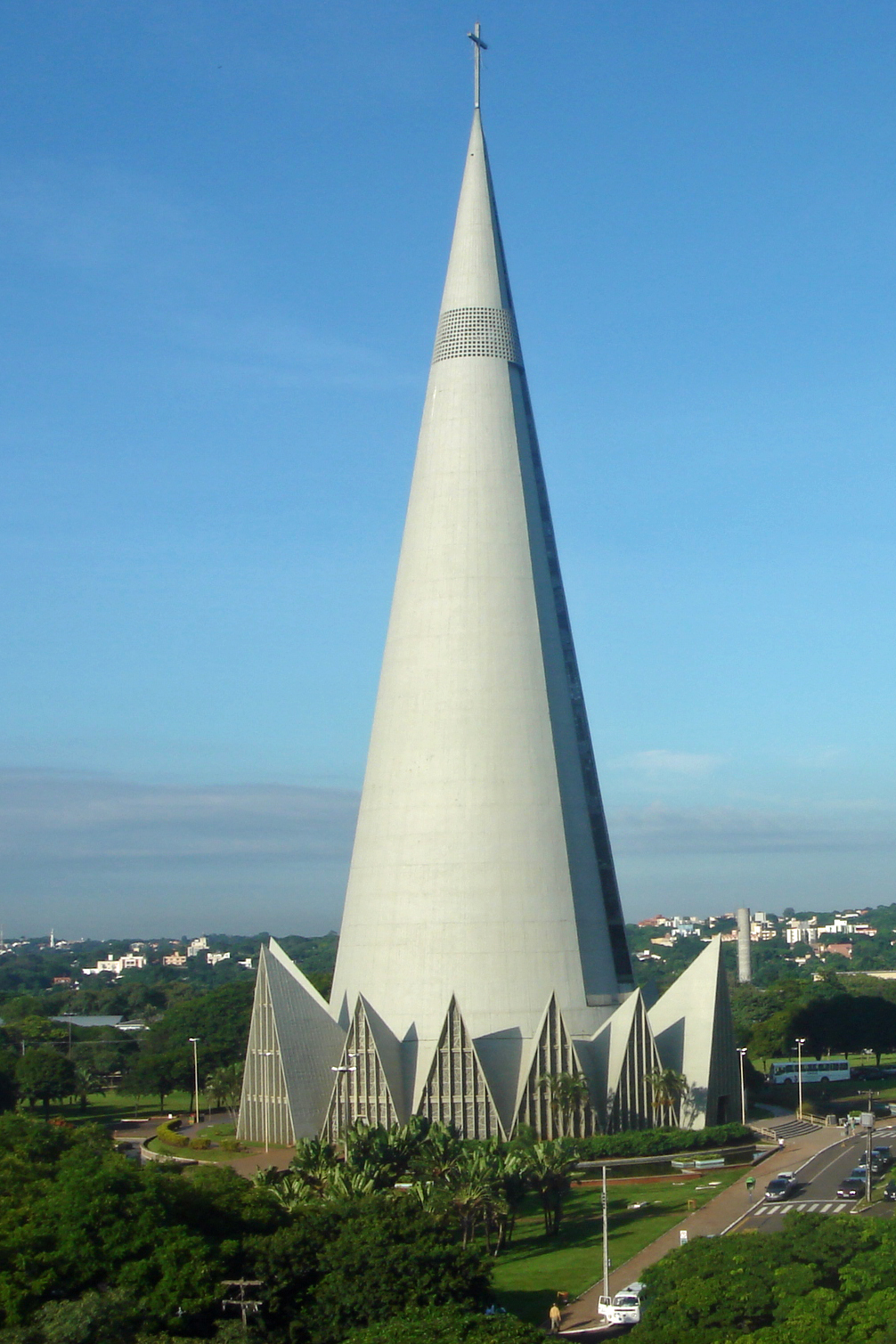

Religion
- Affiliation: Catholic
- Diocese: Archdiocese of Maringá
- Ecclesiastical or organizational status: Cathedral, minor basilica
- Year consecrated: 1959

Location
- Location: Maringá, Paraná, Brazil
- Interactive map of Catedral Basílica Menor Nossa Senhora da Glória

Architecture
- Architect: José Augusto Bellucci
- Style: Brutalism
- Completed: 1972

Specifications
- Capacity: 4,500
- Height (max): 124 m (407 ft)

Website
- http://www.arquimaringa.org.br

Catedral Basílica Menor Nossa Senhora da Glória (or simply Catedral de Maringá Cathedral of Maringá) is a Roman Catholic cathedral located in downtown Maringá, Paraná, Brazil, reaching 124 metres (407 ft) in height. It was completed in 1972 and is the tallest church building in the Americas and the 18th tallest in the world.

Architect José Augusto Bellucci was inspired by the Soviet Sputnik satellites when he designed the cathedral's modernist, conical shape. The design was idealized by the archbishop Dom Jaime Luiz Coelho.

The foundation stone, a piece of marble from St. Peter's Basilica in Rome blessed by Pope Pius XII, was laid on 15 August 1958. The church was built from July 1959 until 10 May 1972, the 25th anniversary of the city.

== Gallery ==
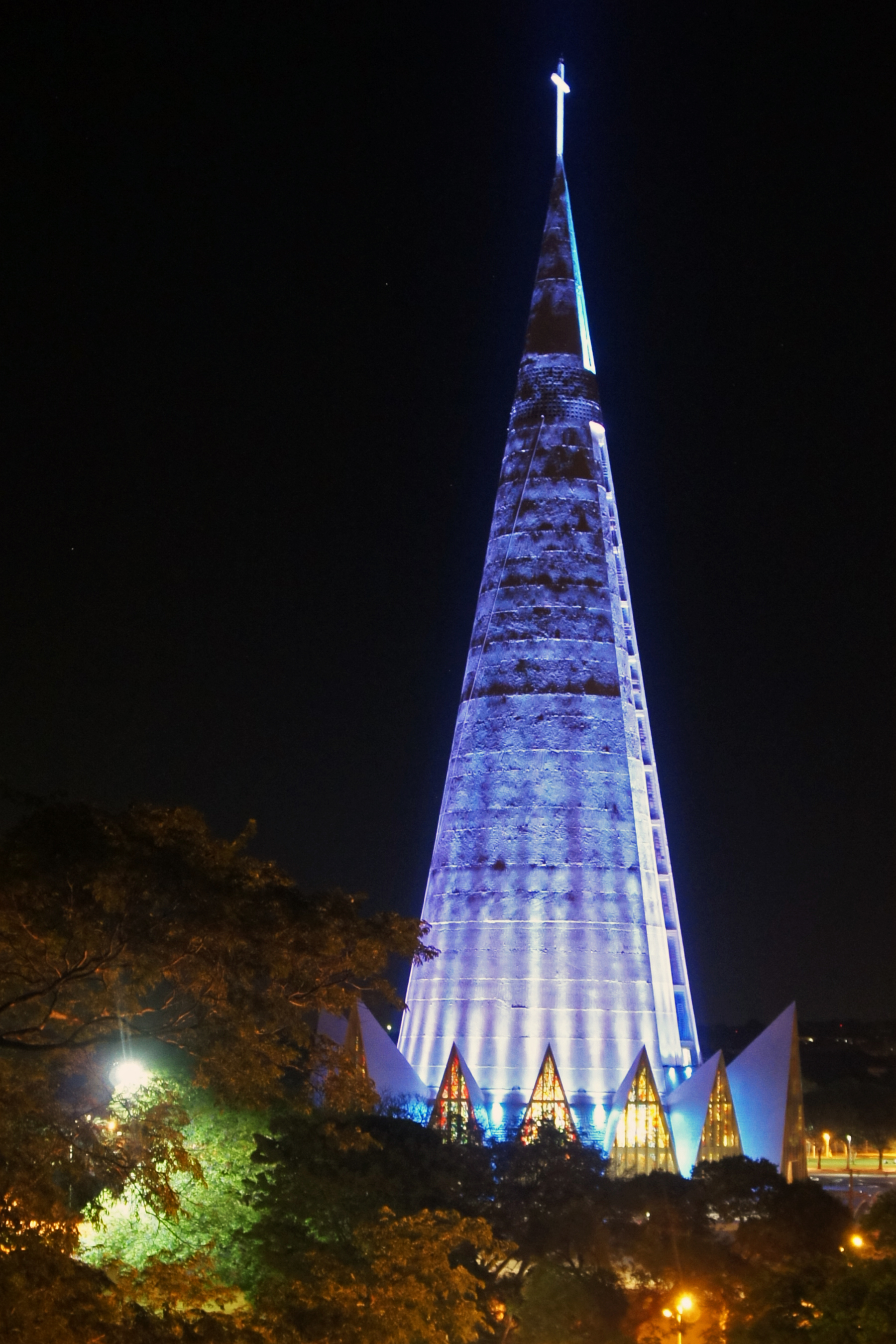

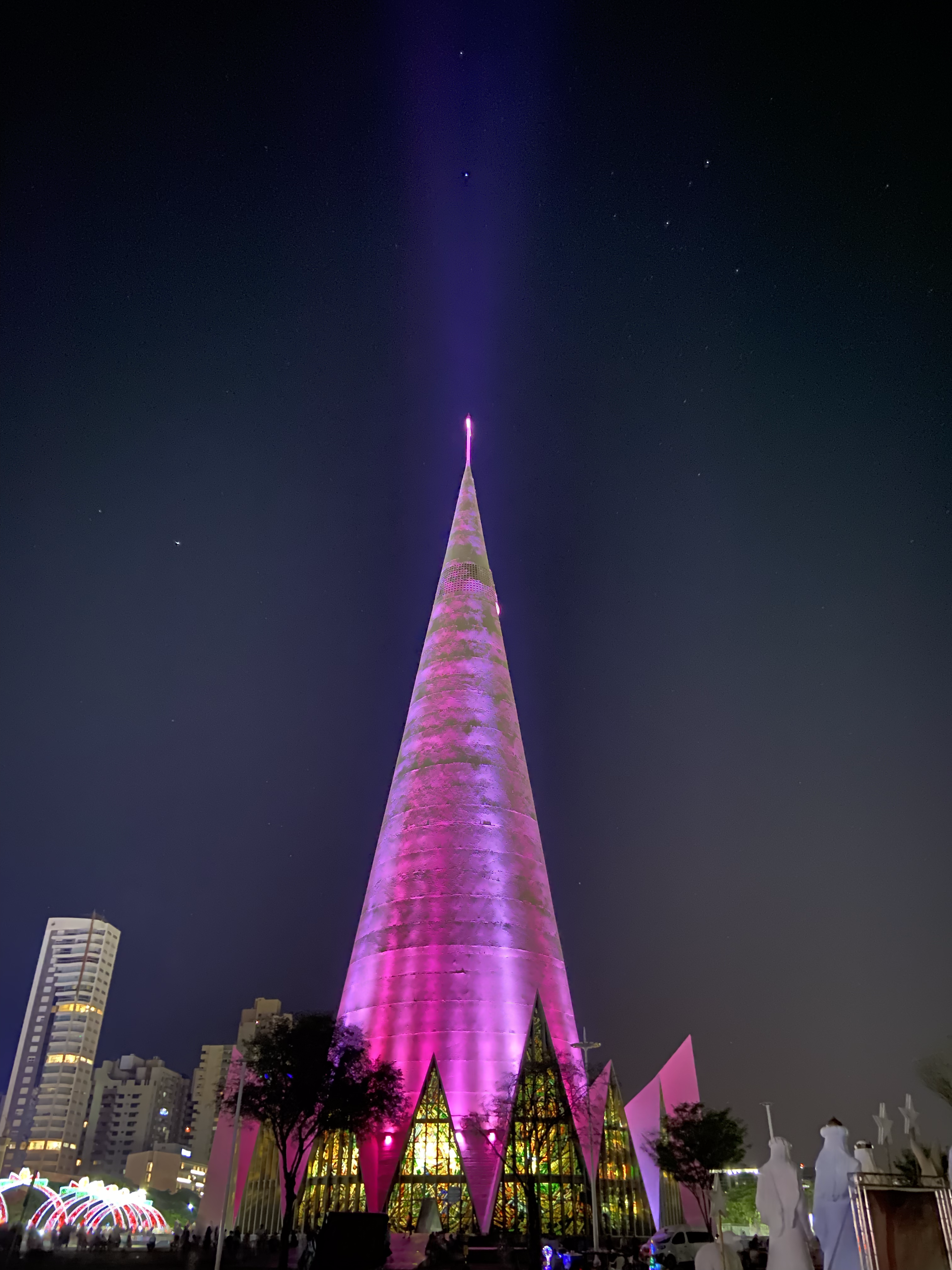

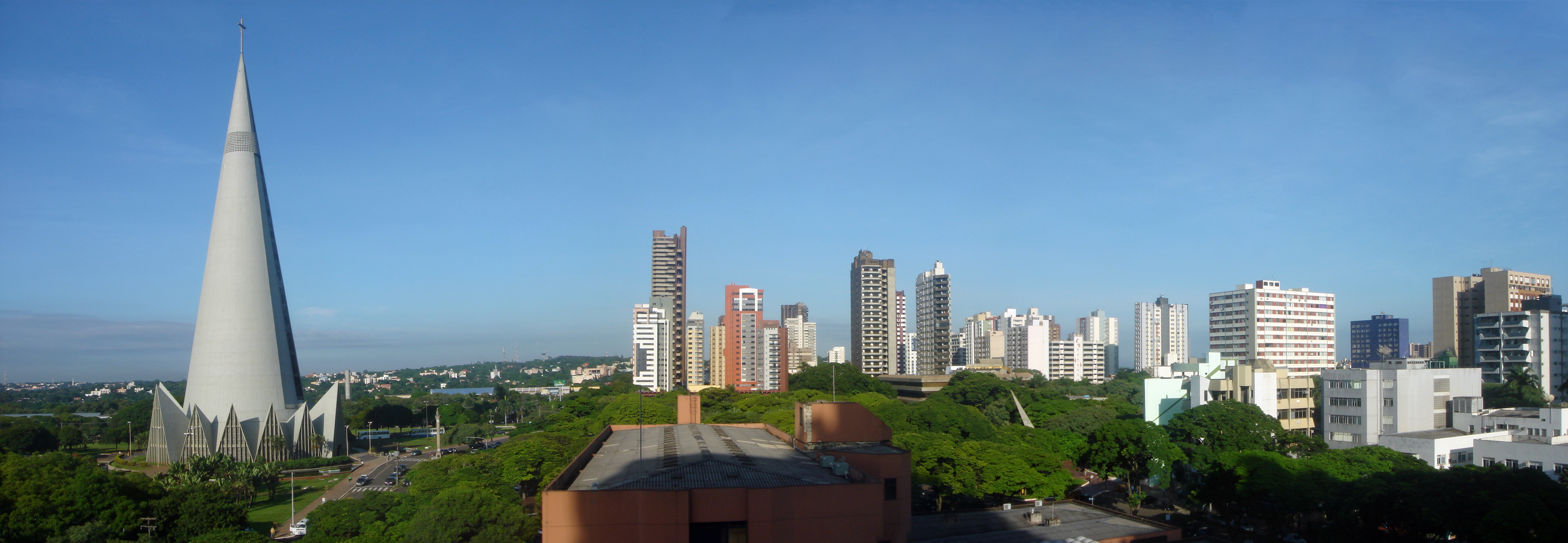

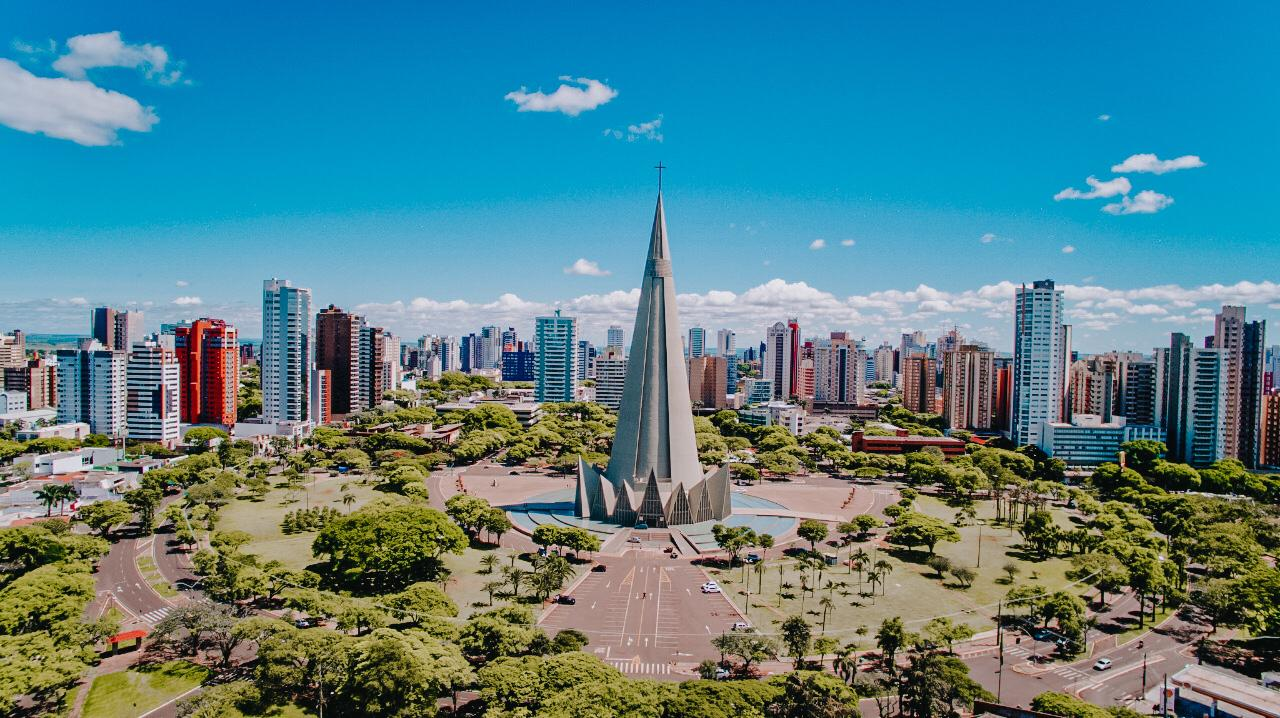

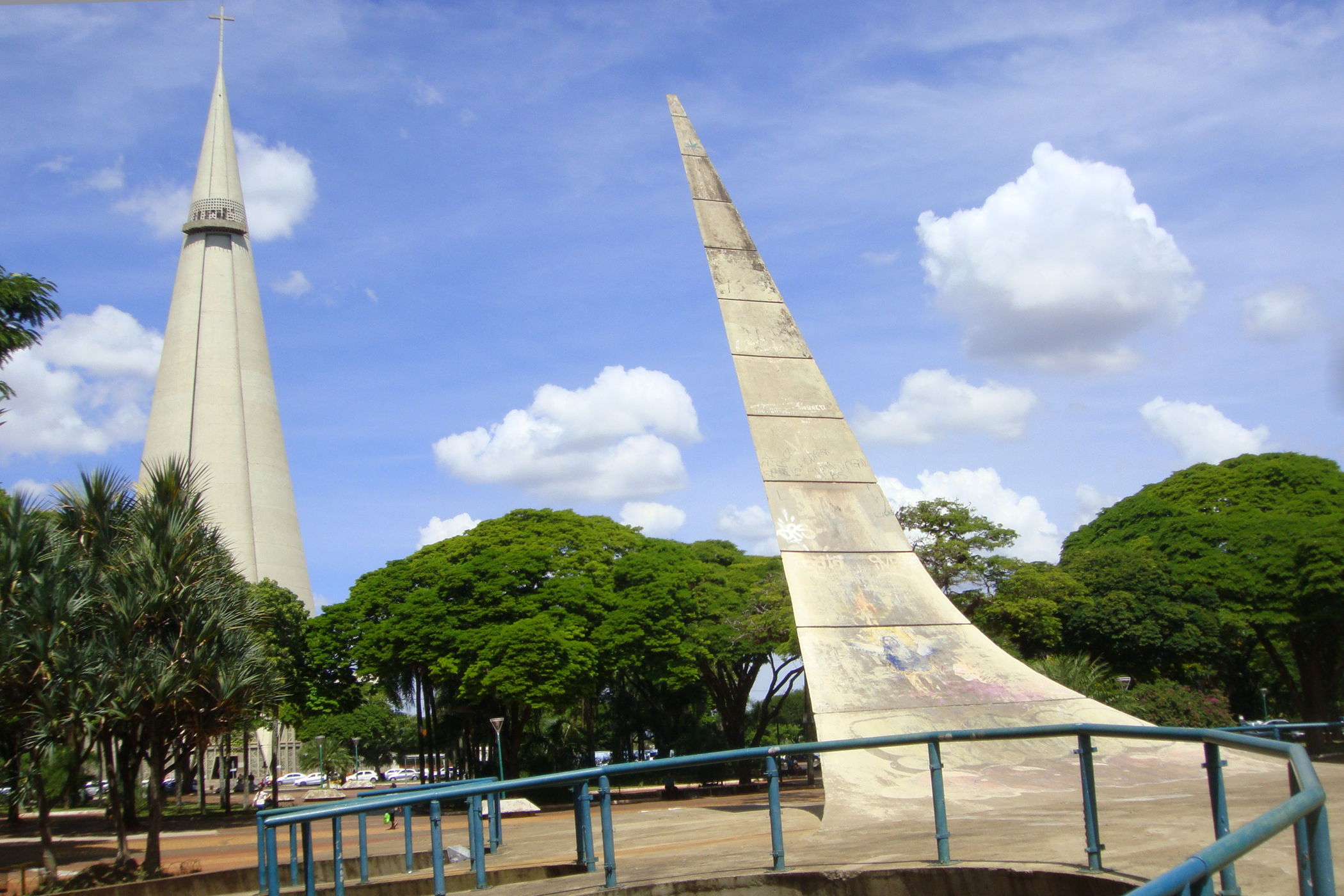

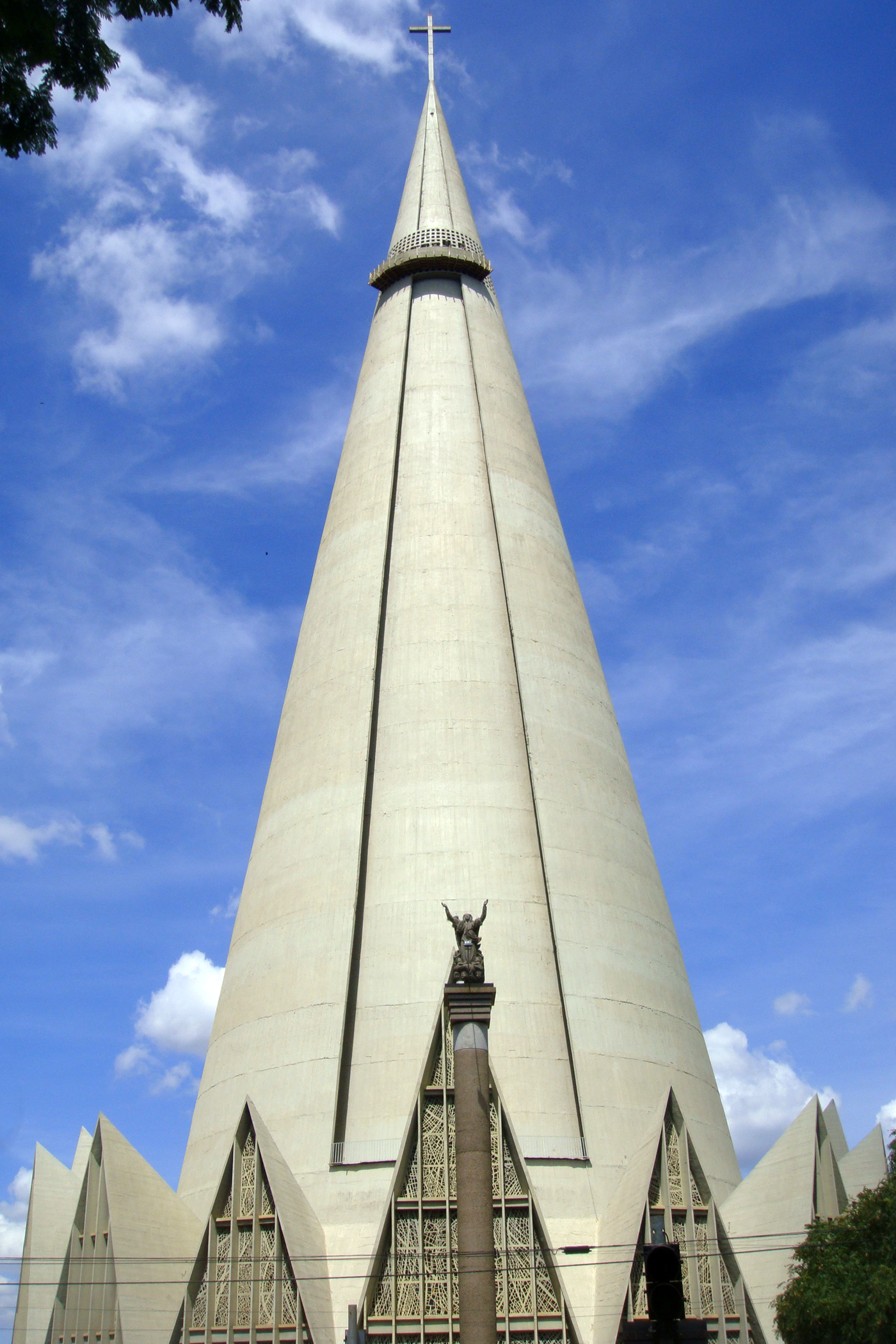
