= Astolfo Dutra =

Municipality in Minas Gerais, Brazil

Coordinates: 21°19′S 42°52′W

- Municipality
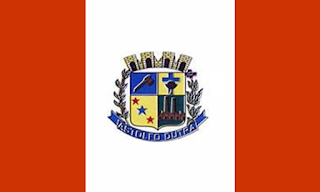
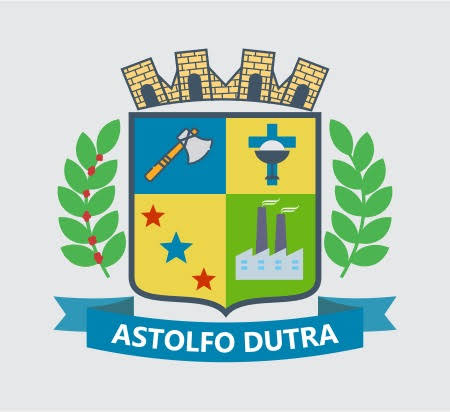
- Flag Coat of arms
- Interactive map of Astolfo Dutra
- Country: Brazil
- State: Minas Gerais
- Region: Southeast
- Time zone: UTC−3 (BRT)

Location of Astolfo Dutra within Minas Gerais

Astolfo Dutra is a municipality in the state of Minas Gerais, Brazil. Its population as of 2020 is estimated to be 14,270 people living in an elevation of 260 meters. The area of the municipality is 159.139 km^{2} (61.444 sq mi). The city belongs to the mesoregion of Zona da Mata and to the microregion of Ubá.

== See also ==
- List of municipalities in Minas Gerais
