= Geremias Steinmetz =

Brazilian archbishop (born 1965)

The Most Reverend Geremias Steinmetz
- Archbishop of Londrina
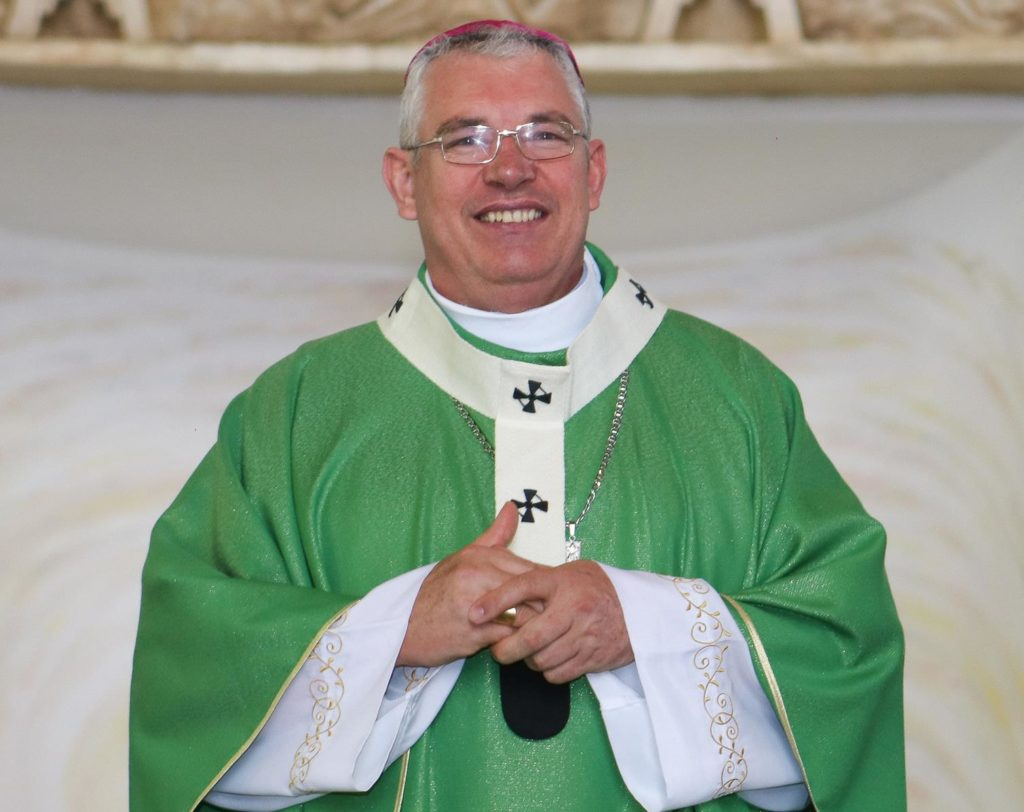
- Church: Catholic Church
- Archdiocese: Londrina
- Appointed: 14 June 2017
- Installed: 12 August 2017
- Predecessor: Orlando Brandes
- Previous post: Bishop of Paranavaí (2011–2017)

Orders
- Ordination: 9 February 1991
- Consecration: 25 March 2011 by José Antônio Peruzzo
- Rank: Archbishop

Personal details
- Born: Geremias Steinmetz; 26 February 1965 (age 61) Sulina, Paraná, Brazil
- Denomination: Catholic
- Education: Pontifical Atheneum of St. Anselm
- Motto: Cognoverunt Eum In Fractione Panis ('They recognized him in the breaking of the bread'; Luke 24:35)

Geremias Steinmetz (born 26 February 1965) is a Brazilian prelate of the Catholic Church who has been Archbishop of Londrina since 2017. He was Bishop of Paranavaí from 2011 to 2017.

== Early years ==
Geremias Steinmetz was born in Sulina, Paraná, on 26 February 1965 to Ana Maria Bieger Steinmetz and Carlos Nicolau Steinmetz, one of eleven children. He entered the São João Maria Vianey Seminary in Palmas in 1977, and then studied philosophy in the Faculty of Philosophy of Palmas and theology at the Instituto Teologico Santa Catarina in Florianópolis. He spent the years 1995 to 1997 obtaining a licentiate in sacred liturgy from the Pontifical Atheneum of St. Anselm in Rome.

He was ordained a priest of the Diocese of Palmas–Francisco Beltrão on 9 February 1991 by Bishop Agostinho José Sartori. His pastoral assignments included parish vicar of the Senhor Bom Jesus Cathedral from 1991 to 1993; parish priest of Nossa Senhora Aparecida in Palmas from 1993 to 1995, and of Cristo Rei in Francisco Beltrão from 1998 to 2001; and rector of the diocesan seminary from 2002 to 2006. From 2006 to 2010 he was vicar general of the diocese, a member of its College of Consulters and its Priests Council, and the coordinator of its evangelization programs. He also taught at the Institute of Theology of the Archdiocese of Cascavel from 1999 to 2010.

== Bishop and archbishop ==
On 5 January 2011, Pope Benedict XVI appointed him Bishop of Paranavaí. He received his episcopal consecration on March 25 from José Antônio Peruzzo, Bishop of Palmas-Francisco Beltrão. He was installed there on 9 April and chose as his episcopal motto Cognoverunt Eum In Fractione Panis ('They recognized him in the breaking of the bread'; Luke 24:35). In Paranavaí his initiatives included restoring the vocation ministry and priest training programs, and relaunching the program for training extraordinary ministers; restructuring administration; and renewed focus on catechesis for youth and families. He was also elected vice-president of the South Region 2 of the Episcopal Conference of Brazil (CNBB) and the conference's contact for Cáritas Regional.

On 14 June 2017, Pope Francis appointed him Archbishop of Londrina. Geremias was installed there 12 August 2017. When asked about the Londrina clergy's tradition of political engagement, he said the Church cannot avoid political issues and added: "I believe that the Church is an opinion-maker and should rather contribute to a better policy. We must promote politics without being partisans."

In 2019 he was elected to a three-year term as president of the South Region 2 of the CNBB, effective 10 May. He is also a member of its Permanent Council and of its Commissions for Liturgy, for Migrants, and for the Earth.

In January 2018, his diocese hosted the Inter-Church Conference of Base Ecclesial Communities (BCEs). He stressed the need to balance the movement's drive for social transformation with a need to "act calmly, with much serenity" so as to avoid creating the impression of political partisanship. He said: "We have to be very careful in that dialogue with society." Conservative activists criticized Steinmetz, citing the display of partisan political party banners at the BCE meeting, and in July 2019 a business trade group protested a diocesan statement detailing how the government's proposed pension reform will hurt workers. Steinmetz said: "Those associations are employers’ organizations. They’re free to express their opinion, but the Church cannot be silent when it knows the people will be harmed."

Catholic Church titles
Preceded by Sérgio Aparecido Colombo	Bishop of Paranavaí; 2011–2017	Succeeded by Mário Spaki
Preceded by Orlando Brandes	Archbishop of Londrina; 2017-present	Incumbent
