= Murilo Ramos Krieger =

Brazilian Catholic prelate

The Most Reverend Dom Murilo Ramos Krieger
- Archbishop emeritus of São Salvador da Bahia, Primate of Brazil
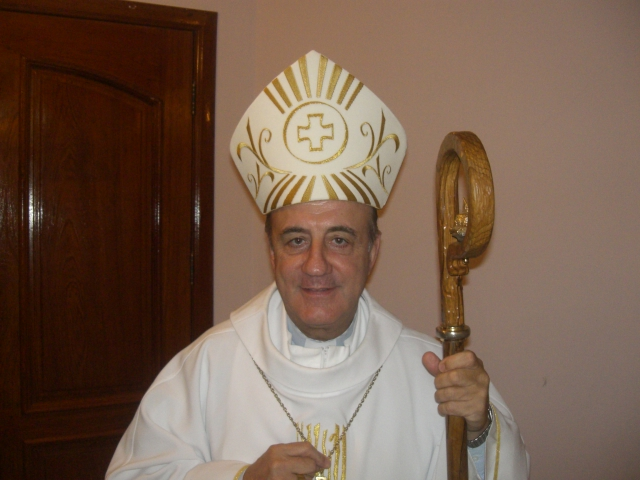
- Church: Roman Catholic Church
- Archdiocese: Roman Catholic Archdiocese of São Salvador da Bahia
- Appointed: 12 January 2011
- Term ended: 11 March 2020
- Predecessor: Geraldo Majella Agnelo
- Successor: Sérgio da Rocha
- Previous posts: Titular Bishop of Lysinia (1985–1991); Auxiliary Bishop of Florianopolis (1985–1991); Bishop of Monta Grossa (1991–1997); Archbishop of Maringá (1997–2002); Archbishop of Florianópolis (2002–2011)

Orders
- Ordination: 7 December 1969
- Consecration: 28 April 1985 by Archbishop Alfonso Niehues
- Rank: Archbishop-Primate

Personal details
- Born: Murilo Sebastião Ramos Krieger; 19 September 1943 (age 82) Brusque, Brazil
- Denomination: Roman Catholic
- Motto: Deus Caritas Est ('God Is Love')
- Coat of arms

Styles of Murilo Sebastião Ramos Krieger
- Reference style: The Most Reverend
- Spoken style: Your Excellency
- Religious style: Archbishop
- Posthumous style: not applicable

Murilo Sebastião Ramos Krieger, SCJ (born 19 September 1943) is a retired Brazilian prelate of the Catholic Church who was the Archbishop of São Salvador da Bahia and Primate of Brazil from 2011 to 2020. He served as archbishop of Florianópolis from 2002 to 2011.

== Biography ==
=== Early life and priesthood ===
Ramos Krieger was born in 1943 in Brusque, in the Archdiocese of Florianópolis, Brazil. He entered the seminary of the Congregation of the Sacred Heart of Jesus (the Dehonians), where he did his primary and secondary studies. He studied philosophy in the convent of the Congregation in Brusque, and theology in Taubaté. He also earned a degree in spirituality in Rome and attended university courses in Brazil.

On 2 February 1967 he made his perpetual profession in the Congregation of the Priests of the Sacred Heart of Jesus and on 7 December 1969 was ordained a priest. He was assistant pastor in Taubaté, superior of the Dehonian scholasticate and then rector of the Dehonian Theological Institute in that same city, as well as superior of the South Brazilian Province of the Congregation.

=== Bishop ===
On 16 February 1985, he was appointed Titular Bishop of Lysinia and Auxiliary Bishop of Florianópolis by Pope John Paul II, and received episcopal consecration on 28 April. On 8 May 1991, he became Bishop of Ponta Grossa, State of Paraná and, on 7 May 1997, Archbishop of Maringá, also in the State of Paraná. On 20 February 2002 he was appointed Metropolitan Archbishop of Florianópolis, State of Santa Catarina, where he served until 2011.

=== Archbishop and Primate ===
On 12 January 2011, Ramos Krieger was appointed Primate of Brazil and Archbishop of São Salvador da Bahia by Pope Benedict XVI. He was installed on 25 March. On 20 April 2015, he became the Vice-President of the National Congress of Bishops of Brazil. He writes monthly for the magazine Messenger of the Sacred Heart (São Paulo-SP), Brazil Christian (Valinhos-SP) and the Journal of the Archdiocese (Florianópolis, SC).

Pope Francis accepted his resignation on 11 March 2020.

Catholic Church titles
Preceded by Conrado Walter	Titular Bishop of Lysinia; 16 February 1985 – 8 May 1991	Succeeded by José Antônio Aparecido Tosi Marques
Preceded by Geraldo Micheletto Pellanda, C.P.	Bishop of Ponta Grossa; 8 May 1991 – 7 May 1997	Succeeded by João Braz de Aviz
Preceded by Jaime Coelho	Archbishop of Maringá; 7 May 1997 – 20 February 2002	Succeeded by João Braz de Aviz
Preceded by Eusébio Oscar Scheid, S.C.I.	Archbishop of Florianópolis; 20 February 2002 – 12 January 2011	Succeeded by Wilson Tadeu Jönck
Preceded by Geraldo Majella Cardinal Agnelo	Archbishop of São Salvador da Bahia; 12 January 2011–11 March 2020	Succeeded by Sérgio da Rocha
