= Archdiocese of Maringá =

Catholic ecclesiastical territory

Coordinates: 23.4263°S 51.9383°W

Archdiocese of Maringá Archidioecesis Maringaënsis

Catholic
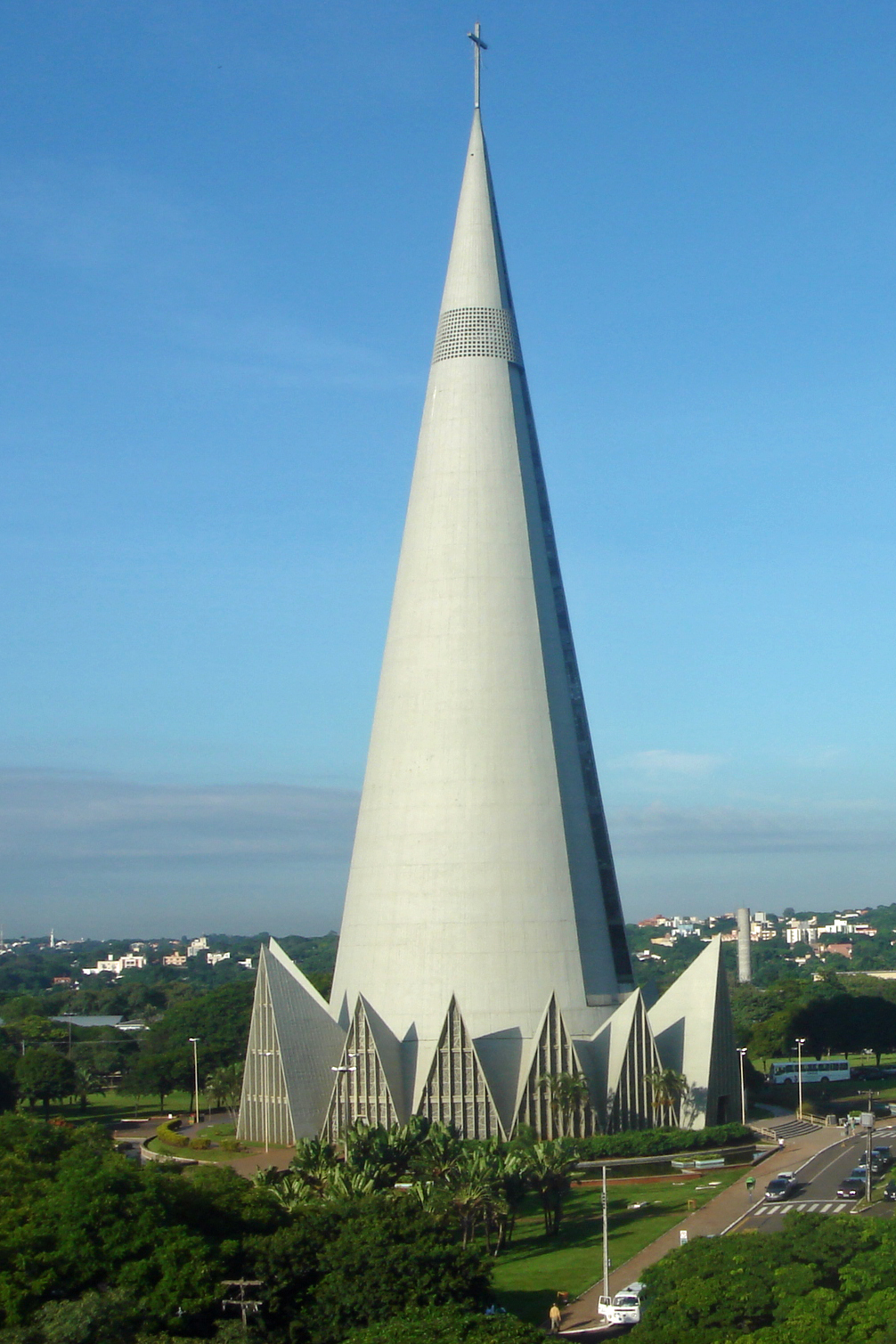
- Cathedral

- Coat of arms

Location
- Country: Brazil

Statistics
- Area: 6,294 km^{2} (2,430 sq mi)
- Population: Total; Catholics: (as of 2004); 611,654; 428,157 (70.0%)

Information
- Rite: Latin Rite
- Established: 1 February 1956 (70 years ago)
- Cathedral: Catedral Metropolitana Basílica Nossa Senhora da Glória

Current leadership
- Pope: Leo XIV
- Archbishop: Severino Clasen, OFM
- Bishops emeritus: Anuar Battisti

Website
- www.arquimaringa.org.br

The Roman Catholic Archdiocese of Maringá (Latin: Archidioecesis Maringaënsis) is an archdiocese located in the city of Maringá in Brazil.

== History ==
- February 1, 1956: Established as Diocese of Maringá from the Diocese of Jacarezinho
- October 16, 1979: Promoted as Metropolitan Archdiocese of Maringá

== Leadership ==
=== Ordinaries ===
Bishops

- Jaime Luiz Coelho (3 December 1956 – 16 October 1979 see below)

Archbishops

- Jaime Luiz Coelho (see above 16 October 1979 – 7 May 1997)
- Murilo Sebastião Ramos Krieger, S.C.J. (7 May 1997 – 20 February 2002), appointed, Archbishop of Florianópolis, Santa Catarina
- João Braz de Aviz (17 July 2002 – 18 January 2004), appointed, Archbishop of Brasília, Distrito Federal; future Cardinal
- Anuar Battisti (29 September 2004 – 20 November 2019)
- Severino Clasen, O.F.M. (1 July 2020 – )

=== Other priests of this diocese who became bishops ===
- Edmar Perón, appointed Auxiliary Bishop of São Paulo in 2009
- Bruno Elizeu Versari, appointed Coadjutor Bishop of Campo Mourão, Parana in 2017

== Suffragan dioceses ==
- Diocese of Campo Mourão
- Diocese of Paranavaí
- Diocese of Umuarama

== Sources ==
- GCatholic.org
- Catholic Hierarchy
- Archdiocese website (Portuguese)
