= List of Catholic dioceses in South America =

== List of Dioceses ==
=== Antilles Episcopal Conference ===
==== Ecclesiastical Province of Port of Spain ====
- Archdiocese of Port of Spain
  - Diocese of Bridgetown
  - Diocese of Georgetown
  - Diocese of Kingstown
  - Diocese of Paramaribo
  - Diocese of Willemstad

=== Episcopal Conference of Argentina ===
==== Ecclesiastical province of Bahía Blanca ====
- Archdiocese of Bahía Blanca
  - Diocese of Alto Valle del Río Negro
  - Diocese of Comodoro Rivadavia
  - Diocese of Rawson
  - Diocese of Río Gallegos
  - Diocese of San Carlos de Bariloche
  - Diocese of Santa Rosa
  - Diocese of Viedma

==== Ecclesiastical province of Buenos Aires ====
- Archdiocese of Buenos Aires
  - Diocese of Avellaneda-Lanús
  - Diocese of Gregorio de Laferrère
  - Diocese of Lomas de Zamora
  - Diocese of Morón
  - Diocese of Merlo-Moreno
  - Diocese of San Isidro
  - Diocese of San Justo
  - Diocese of San Martín
  - Diocese of San Miguel

==== Ecclesiastical province of Córdoba ====
- Archdiocese of Córdoba
  - Diocese of Cruz del Eje
  - Diocese of Villa de la Concepción del Río Cuarto
  - Diocese of San Francisco
  - Diocese of Villa María
  - Prelature of Deán Funes

==== Ecclesiastical province of Corrientes ====
- Archdiocese of Corrientes
  - Diocese of Goya
  - Diocese of Posadas
  - Diocese of Puerto Iguazú
  - Diocese of Santo Tomé

==== Ecclesiastical province of La Plata ====
- Archdiocese of La Plata
  - Diocese of Azul
  - Diocese of Chascomús
  - Diocese of Mar del Plata
  - Diocese of Nueve de Julio
  - Diocese of Quilmes
  - Diocese of Zárate-Campana

==== Ecclesiastical province of Mendoza ====
- Archdiocese of Mendoza
  - Diocese of Neuquén
  - Diocese of San Rafael

==== Ecclesiastical province of Mercedes-Luján ====
- Archdiocese of Mercedes-Luján

==== Ecclesiastical province of Paraná ====
- Archdiocese of Paraná
  - Diocese of Concordia
  - Diocese of Gualeguaychú

==== Ecclesiastical province of Resistencia ====
- Archdiocese of Resistencia
  - Diocese of Formosa
  - Diocese of San Roque de Presidencia Roque Sáenz Peña

==== Ecclesiastical province of Rosario ====
- Archdiocese of Rosario
  - Diocese of San Nicolás de los Arroyos
  - Diocese of Venado Tuerto

==== Ecclesiastical province of Salta ====
- Archdiocese of Salta
  - Diocese of Catamarca
  - Diocese of Jujuy
  - Diocese of Orán
  - Prelature of Cafayate
  - Prelature of Humahuaca

==== Ecclesiastical province of San Juan ====
- Archdiocese of San Juan de Cuyo
  - Diocese of La Rioja
  - Diocese of San Luis

==== Ecclesiastical province of Santa Fe ====
- Archdiocese of Santa Fe de la Vera Cruz
  - Diocese of Rafaela
  - Diocese of Reconquista

==== Ecclesiastical province of Tucumán ====
- Archdiocese of Tucumán
  - Diocese of Añatuya
  - Diocese of Concepción
  - Archdiocese of Santiago del Estero

=== Episcopal Conference of Bolivia ===
==== Ecclesiastical province of Cochabamba ====
- Archdiocese of Cochabamba
  - Diocese of Oruro
  - Prelature of Aiquile

==== Ecclesiastical province of La Paz ====
- Archdiocese of La Paz
  - Diocese of Coroico
  - Diocese of El Alto
  - Prelature of Corocoro

==== Ecclesiastical province of Santa Cruz de la Sierra ====
- Archdiocese of Santa Cruz de la Sierra
  - Diocese of San Ignacio de Velasco

==== Ecclesiastical province of Sucre ====
- Archdiocese of Sucre
  - Diocese of Potosí
  - Diocese of Tarija

=== Episcopal Conference of Brazil ===
==== Ecclesiastical province of Aparecida ====
- Archdiocese of Aparecida
  - Diocese of Caraguatatuba
  - Diocese of Lorena
  - Diocese of São José dos Campos
  - Diocese of Taubaté

==== Ecclesiastical province of Aracaju ====
- Archdiocese of Aracaju
  - Diocese of Estância
  - Diocese of Propriá

==== Ecclesiastical province of Belém do Pará ====
- Archdiocese of Belém do Pará
  - Diocese of Abaetetuba
  - Diocese of Bragança do Pará
  - Diocese of Castanhal
  - Diocese of Macapá
  - Diocese of Marabá
  - Diocese of Óbidos
  - Diocese of Ponta de Pedras
  - Diocese of Santarém
  - Prelature of Cametá
  - Prelature of Itaituba
  - Prelature of Marajó
  - Prelature of Xingu

==== Ecclesiastical province of Belo Horizonte ====
- Archdiocese of Belo Horizonte
  - Diocese of Divinópolis
  - Diocese of Luz
  - Diocese of Oliveira
  - Diocese of Sete Lagoas

==== Ecclesiastical province of Botucatu ====
- Archdiocese of Botucatu
  - Diocese of Araçatuba
  - Diocese of Assis
  - Diocese of Bauru
  - Diocese of Lins
  - Diocese of Marília
  - Diocese of Ourinhos
  - Diocese of Presidente Prudente

==== Ecclesiastical province of Brasília ====
- Archdiocese of Brasília
  - Diocese of Formosa
  - Diocese of Luziânia
  - Diocese of Uruaçu

==== Ecclesiastical province of Campinas ====
- Archdiocese of Campinas
  - Diocese of Amparo
  - Diocese of Bragança Paulista
  - Diocese of Limeira
  - Diocese of Piracicaba
  - Diocese of São Carlos

==== Ecclesiastical province of Campo Grande ====
- Archdiocese of Campo Grande
  - Diocese of Corumbá
  - Diocese of Coxim
  - Diocese of Dourados
  - Diocese of Jardim
  - Diocese of Naviraí
  - Diocese of Três Lagoas

==== Ecclesiastical province of Cascavel ====
- Diocese of Cascavel
  - Diocese of Foz do Iguaçu
  - Diocese of Palmas-Francisco Beltrão
  - Diocese of Toledo

==== Ecclesiastical province of Cuiabá ====
- Archdiocese of Cuiabá
  - Diocese of Barra do Garças
  - Diocese of Diamantino
  - Diocese of Guiratinga
  - Diocese of Juína
  - Diocese of Rondonópolis
  - Diocese of São Luíz de Cáceres
  - Prelature of Paranatinga
  - Prelature of São Félix

==== Ecclesiastical province of Curitiba ====
- Archdiocese of Curitiba
  - Diocese of Guarapuava
  - Diocese of Paranaguá
  - Diocese of Ponta Grossa
  - Diocese of União da Vitória
  - Diocese of São João Batista em Curitiba
  - Diocese of São José dos Pinhais

==== Ecclesiastical province of Diamantina ====
- Archdiocese of Diamantina
  - Diocese of Almenara
  - Diocese of Araçuaí
  - Diocese of Guanhães
  - Diocese of Teófilo Otoni

==== Ecclesiastical province of Feira de Santana ====
- Archdiocese of Feira de Santana
  - Diocese of Barra do Rio Grande
  - Diocese of Barreiras
  - Diocese of Bonfim
  - Diocese of Irecê
  - Diocese of Juazeiro
  - Diocese of Paulo Afonso
  - Diocese of Ruy Barbosa
  - Diocese of Serrinha

==== Ecclesiastical province of Florianópolis ====
- Archdiocese of Florianópolis
  - Diocese of Blumenau
  - Diocese of Caçador
  - Diocese of Chapecó
  - Diocese of Criciúma
  - Diocese of Joaçaba
  - Diocese of Joinville
  - diocese of Lages
  - Diocese of Rio do Sul
  - Diocese of Tubarão

==== Ecclesiastical province of Fortaleza ====
- Archdiocese of Fortaleza
  - Diocese of Crateús
  - Diocese of Crato
  - Diocese of Iguatú
  - Diocese of Itapipoca
  - Diocese of Limoeiro do Norte
  - Diocese of Fortaleza
  - Diocese of Sobral
  - Diocese of Tianguá

==== Ecclesiastical province of Goiânia ====
- Archdiocese of Goiânia
  - Diocese of Anápolis
  - Diocese of Goiás
  - Diocese of Ipameri
  - Diocese of Itumbiara
  - Diocese of Jataí
  - Diocese of Rubiataba-Mozarlândia
  - Diocese of São Luís de Montes Belos

==== Ecclesiastical province of Juiz de Fora ====
- Archdiocese of Juiz de Fora
  - Diocese of Leopoldina
  - Diocese of São João del Rei

==== Ecclesiastical province of Londrina ====
- Archdiocese of Londrina
  - Diocese of Apucarana
  - Diocese of Cornélio Procópio
  - Diocese of Jacarezinho

==== Ecclesiastical province of Maceió ====
- Archdiocese of Maceió
  - Diocese of Palmeira dos Índios
  - Diocese of Penedo

==== Ecclesiastical province of Manaus ====
- Archdiocese of Manaus
  - Diocese of Alto Solimões
  - Diocese of Coari
  - Diocese of Parintins
  - Diocese of Roraima
  - Diocese of São Gabriel da Cachoeira
  - Territorial Prelature of Borba
  - Territorial Prelature of Itacoatiara
  - Territorial Prelature of Tefé

==== Ecclesiastical province of Mariana ====
- Archdiocese of Mariana
  - Diocese of Caratinga
  - Diocese of Governador Valadares
  - Diocese of Itabira-Fabriciano

==== Ecclesiastical province of Maringá ====
- Archdiocese of Maringá
  - Diocese of Campo Mourão
  - Diocese of Paranavaí
  - Diocese of Umuarama

==== Ecclesiastical province of Montes Claros ====
- Archdiocese of Montes Claros
  - Diocese of Janaúba
  - Diocese of Januária
  - Diocese of Paracatu

==== Ecclesiastical province of Natal ====
- Archdiocese of Natal
  - Diocese of Caicó
  - Diocese of Mossoró

==== Ecclesiastical province of Niterói ====
- Archdiocese of Niterói
  - Diocese of Campos
  - Diocese of Nova Friburgo
  - Diocese of Petrópolis

==== Ecclesiastical province of Olinda e Recife ====
- Archdiocese of Olinda e Recife
  - Diocese of Afogados da Ingazeira
  - Diocese of Caruaru
  - Diocese of Floresta
  - Diocese of Garanhuns
  - Diocese of Nazaré
  - Diocese of Palmares
  - Diocese of Pesqueira
  - Diocese of Petrolina

==== Ecclesiastical province of Palmas ====
- Archdiocese of Palmas
  - Diocese of Cristalândia
  - Diocese of Miracema do Tocantins
  - Diocese of Porto Nacional
  - Diocese of Tocantinópolis

==== Ecclesiastical province of Paraíba ====
- Archdiocese of Paraíba
  - Diocese of Cajazieras
  - Diocese of Campina Grande
  - Diocese of Guarabira
  - Diocese of Patos

==== Ecclesiastical province of Passo Fundo ====
- Archdiocese of Passo Fundo
  - Diocese of Erexim
  - Diocese of Frederico Westphalen
  - Diocese of Vacaria

==== Ecclesiastical province of Pelotas ====
- Archdiocese of Pelotas
  - Diocese of Bagé
  - Diocese of Rio Grande

==== Ecclesiastical province of Porto Alegre ====
- Archdiocese of Porto Alegre
  - Diocese of Caxias do Sul
  - Diocese of Montenegro
  - Diocese of Novo Hamburgo
  - Diocese of Osório

==== Ecclesiastical province of Porto Velho ====
- Archdiocese of Porto Velho
  - Diocese of Cruzeiro do Sul
  - Diocese of Guajará-Mirim
  - Diocese of Humaitá
  - Diocese of Ji-Paraná
  - Diocese of Rio Branco
  - Prelature of Lábrea

==== Ecclesiastical province of Pouso Alegre ====
- Archdiocese of Pouso Alegre
  - Diocese of Campanha
  - Diocese of Guaxupé

==== Ecclesiastical province of Ribeirão Preto ====
- Archdiocese of Ribeirão Preto
  - Diocese of Barretos
  - Diocese of Catanduva
  - Diocese of Franca
  - Diocese of Jaboticabal
  - Diocese of Jales
  - Diocese of São João da Boa Vista
  - Diocese of São José do Rio Preto

==== Ecclesiastical province of Santa Maria ====
- Archdiocese of Santa Maria
  - Diocese of Cachoeira do Sul
  - Diocese of Cruz Alta
  - Diocese of Santa Cruz do Sul
  - Diocese of Santo Ângelo
  - Diocese of Uruguaiana

==== Ecclesiastical province of São Luís do Maranhão ====
- Archdiocese of São Luís do Maranhão
  - Diocese of Bacabal
  - Diocese of Balsas
  - Diocese of Brejo
  - Diocese of Carolina
  - Diocese of Caxias do Maranhão
  - Diocese of Coroatá
  - Diocese of Grajaú
  - Diocese of Imperatriz
  - Diocese of Pinheiro
  - Diocese of Viana
  - Diocese of Zé-Doca

==== Ecclesiastical province of São Paulo ====
- Archdiocese of São Paulo
  - Diocese of Campo Limpo
  - Diocese of Caraguatatuba
  - Diocese of Guarulhos
  - Diocese of Mogi das Cruzes
  - Diocese of Nossa Senhora do Líbano em São Paulo
  - Diocese of Nossa Senhora do Paraíso em São Paulo
  - Diocese of Osasco
  - Diocese of Santo Amaro
  - Diocese of Santo André
  - Diocese of Santos
  - Diocese of São Miguel Paulista

==== Ecclesiastical province of São Salvador da Bahia ====
- Archdiocese of São Salvador da Bahia
  - Diocese of Alagoinhas
  - Diocese of Amargosa
  - Diocese of Camaçari
  - Diocese of Eunápolis
  - Diocese of Ilhéus
  - Diocese of Itabuna
  - Diocese of Teixeira de Freitas-Caravelas

==== Ecclesiastical province of São Sebastião do Rio de Janeiro ====
- Archdiocese of São Sebastião do Rio de Janeiro
  - Diocese of Barra do Piraí-Volta Redonda
  - Diocese of Duque de Caxias
  - Diocese of Itaguaí
  - Diocese of Nova Iguaçu
  - Diocese of Valença

==== Ecclesiastical province of Sorocaba ====
- Archdiocese of Sorocaba
  - Diocese of Itapetininga
  - Diocese of Itapeva
  - Diocese of Jundiaí
  - Diocese of Registro

==== Ecclesiastical province of Teresina ====
- Archdiocese of Teresina
  - Diocese of Bom Jesus do Gurguéia
  - Diocese of Campo Maior
  - Diocese of Floriano
  - Diocese of Oeiras
  - Diocese of Parnaíba
  - Diocese of Picos
  - Diocese of São Raimundo Nonato

==== Ecclesiastical province of Uberaba ====
- Archdiocese of Uberaba
  - Diocese of Ituiutaba
  - Diocese of Patos de Minas
  - Diocese of Uberlândia

==== Ecclesiastical province of Vitória ====
- Archdiocese of Vitória
  - Diocese of Cachoeiro de Itapemirim
  - Diocese of Colatina
  - Diocese of São Mateus

==== Ecclesiastical province of Vitória da Conquista ====
- Archdiocese of Vitória da Conquista
  - Diocese of Bom Jesus da Lapa
  - Diocese of Caetité
  - Diocese of Jequié
  - Diocese of Livramento de Nossa Senhora

=== Episcopal Conference of Chile ===
==== Ecclesiastical province of Antofagasta ====
- Archdiocese of Antofagasta
  - Diocese of Arica
  - Diocese of Iquique
  - Prelature of Calama

==== Ecclesiastical province of Concepción ====
- Archdiocese of Concepción
  - Diocese of Chillán
  - Diocese of Los Ángeles
  - Diocese of Temuco
  - Diocese of Valdivia
  - Diocese of Villarrica

==== Ecclesiastical province of La Serena ====
- Archdiocese of La Serena
  - Diocese of Copiapó
  - Prelature of Illapel

==== Ecclesiastical province of Puerto Montt ====
- Archdiocese of Puerto Montt
  - Diocese of Osorno
  - Diocese of Punta Arenas
  - Diocese of San Carlos de Ancud

==== Ecclesiastical province of Santiago de Chile ====
- Archdiocese of Santiago de Chile
  - Diocese of Linares
  - Diocese of Melipilla
  - Diocese of Rancagua
  - Diocese of San Bernardo
  - Diocese of San Filipe
  - Diocese of Talca
  - Diocese of Valparaíso

=== Episcopal Conference of Colombia ===
==== Ecclesiastical province of Barranquilla ====
- Archdiocese of Barranquilla
  - Diocese of El Banco
  - Diocese of Riohacha
  - Diocese of Santa Marta
  - Diocese of Valledupar

==== Ecclesiastical province of Bogotá ====
- Archdiocese of Bogotá
  - Diocese of Engativá
  - Diocese of Facatativá
  - Diocese of Fontibón
  - Diocese of Girardot
  - Diocese of Soacha
  - Diocese of Zipaquirá

==== Ecclesiastical province of Bucaramanga ====
- Archdiocese of Bucaramanga
  - Diocese of Barrancabermeja
  - Diocese of Málaga-Soatá
  - Diocese of Socorro y San Gil
  - Diocese of Vélez

==== Ecclesiastical province of Cali ====
- Archdiocese of Cali
  - Diocese of Buenaventura
  - Diocese of Buga
  - Diocese of Cartago
  - Diocese of Palmira

==== Ecclesiastical province of Cartagena ====
- Archdiocese of Cartagena
  - Diocese of Magangué
  - Diocese of Montelibano
  - Diocese of Monteria
  - Diocese of Sincelejo

==== Ecclesiastical province of Florencia ====
- Archdiocese of Florencia
  - Diocese of Mocoa–Sibundoy
  - Diocese of San Vicente del Caguán

==== Ecclesiastical province of Ibagué ====
- Archdiocese of Ibagué
  - Diocese of Espinal
  - Diocese of Garzón
  - Diocese of Líbano–Honda
  - Diocese of Neiva

==== Ecclesiastical province of Manizales ====
- Archdiocese of Manizales
  - Diocese of Armenia
  - Diocese of La Dorada-Guaduas
  - Diocese of Pereira

==== Ecclesiastical province of Medellín ====
- Archdiocese of Medellín
  - Diocese of Caldas
  - Diocese of Girardota
  - Diocese of Jericó
  - Diocese of Sonsón-Rionegro

==== Ecclesiastical province of Nueva Pamplona ====
- Archdiocese of Neuva Pamplona
  - Diocese of Arauca
  - Diocese of Cúcuta
  - Diocese of Ocaña
  - Diocese of Tibú

==== Ecclesiastical province of Popayán ====
- Archdiocese of Popayán
  - Diocese of Ipiales
  - Diocese of Pasto
  - Diocese of Tumaco

==== Ecclesiastical province of Santa Fe de Antioquia ====
- Archdiocese of Santa Fe de Antioquia
  - Diocese of Apartadó
  - Diocese of Ismina-Tadó
  - Diocese of Quibdó
  - Diocese of Santa Rosa de Osos

==== Ecclesiastical province of Tunja ====
- Archdiocese of Tunja
  - Diocese of Chiquinquirá
  - Diocese of Duitama-Sogamoso
  - Diocese of Garagoa
  - Diocese of Yopal

==== Ecclesiastical province of Villavicencio ====
- Archdiocese of Villavicencio
  - Diocese of Granada en Colombia
  - Diocese of San José del Guaviare

=== Episcopal Conference of Ecuador ===
==== Ecclesiastical province of Cuenca ====
- Archdiocese of Cuenca
  - Diocese of Azogues
  - Diocese of Loja
  - Diocese of Machala

==== Ecclesiastical province of Guayaquil ====
- Archdiocese of Guayaquil
  - Diocese of Babahoyo
  - Diocese of San Jacinto de Yaguachi

==== Ecclesiastical province of Portoviejo ====
- Archdiocese of Portoviejo
  - Diocese of Santo Domingo de los Colorados

==== Ecclesiastical province of Quito ====
- Archdiocese of Quito
  - Diocese of Ambato
  - Diocese of Guaranda
  - Diocese of Ibarra
  - Diocese of Latacunga
  - Diocese of Riobamba
  - Diocese of Tulcán

=== Episcopal Conference of Paraguay ===
==== Ecclesiastical province of Asunción ====
- Archdiocese of Asunción
  - Diocese of Benjamín Aceval
  - Diocese of Caacupé
  - Diocese of Carapeguá
  - Diocese of Ciudad del Este
  - Diocese of Concepción en Paraguay
  - Diocese of Coronel Oviedo
  - Diocese of Encarnación
  - Diocese of San Juan Bautista de las Misiones
  - Diocese of San Lorenzo
  - Diocese of San Pedro
  - Diocese of Villarrica del Espíritu Santo

=== Episcopal Conference of Peru ===
==== Ecclesiastical province of Arequipa ====
- Archdiocese of Arequipa
  - Diocese of Puno
  - Diocese of Tacna y Moquegua
  - Prelature of Ayaviri
  - Prelature of Chuquibamba
  - Prelature of Juli

==== Ecclesiastical province of Ayacucho ====
- Archdiocese of Ayacucho
  - Diocese of Huancavélica

==== Ecclesiastical province of Cuzco ====
- Archdiocese of Cuzco
  - Diocese of Abancay
  - Diocese of Sicuani
  - Prelature of Chuquibambilla

==== Ecclesiastical province of Huancayo ====
- Archdiocese of Huancayo
  - Diocese of Huánuco
  - Diocese of Tarma

==== Ecclesiastical province of Lima ====
- Archdiocese of Lima
  - Diocese of Callao
  - Diocese of Carabayllo
  - Diocese of Chosica
  - Diocese of Huacho
  - Diocese of Ica
  - Diocese of Talca
  - Diocese of Lurín
  - Prelature of Yauyos

==== Ecclesiastical province of Piura ====
- Archdiocese of Piura
  - Diocese of Chachapoyas
  - Diocese of Chiclayo
  - Diocese of Chulucanas
  - Prelature of Chota

==== Ecclesiastical province of Trujillo ====
- Archdiocese of Trujillo
  - Diocese of Cajamarca
  - Diocese of Chimbote
  - Diocese of Huaraz
  - Diocese of Huarí
  - Prelature of Huamachuco
  - Prelature of Moyobamba

=== Episcopal Conference of Uruguay ===
==== Ecclesiastical province of Montevideo ====
- Archdiocese of Montevideo
  - Diocese of Canelones
  - Diocese of Florida
  - Diocese of Maldonado-Punta del Este
  - Diocese of Melo
  - Diocese of Mercedes
  - Diocese of Minas
  - Diocese of Salto
  - Diocese of San José de Mayo
  - Diocese of Tacuarembó

=== Episcopal Conference of Venezuela ===
==== Ecclesiastical province of Barquisimeto ====
- Archdiocese of Barquisimeto
  - Diocese of Acarigua–Araure
  - Diocese of Carora
  - Diocese of Guanare
  - Diocese of San Felipe

==== Ecclesiastical province of Calabozo ====
- Archdiocese of Calabozo
  - Diocese of San Fernando de Apure
  - Diocese of Valle de la Pascua

==== Ecclesiastical province of Caracas, Santiago de Venezuela ====
- Archdiocese of Caracas, Santiago de Venezuela
  - Diocese of Guarenas
  - Diocese of La Guaira
  - Diocese of Los Teques

==== Ecclesiastical province of Ciudad Bolívar ====
- Archdiocese of Ciudad Bolívar
  - Diocese of Ciudad Guayana
  - Diocese of Maturín

==== Ecclesiastical province of Coro ====
- Archdiocese of Coro
  - Diocese of Punto Fijo

==== Ecclesiastical province of Cumaná ====
- Archdiocese of Cumaná
  - Diocese of Barcelona
  - Diocese of Carúpano
  - Diocese of Margarita

==== Ecclesiastical province of Maracaibo ====
- Archdiocese of Maracaibo
  - Diocese of Cabimas
  - Diocese of El Vigia-San Carlos del Zulia
  - Diocese of Machiques

==== Ecclesiastical province of Mérida ====
- Archdiocese of Mérida
  - Diocese of Barinas
  - Diocese of San Cristóbal de Venezuela
  - Diocese of Trujillo

==== Ecclesiastical province of Valencia en Venezuela ====
- Archdiocese of Valencia en Venezuela
  - Diocese of Maracay
  - Diocese of Puerto Cabello
  - Diocese of San Carlos de Venezuela

== Sources ==
- http://www.catholic-hierarchy.org/diocese/qview3.html
