= Ireneusz =

Male given name

- Pronunciation: Polish: [i.rɛˈnɛ.uʂ]
- Gender: Male
- Language: Polish

Origin
- Region of origin: Poland

Other names
- Related names: Irenaeus, Irinej, Irineu, Irénée

Ireneusz is a Polish male given name derived from the Greek eirenaios.

Notable people with the name include:

- Ireneusz Ciurzyński, Polish sprint canoeist who competed in the mid-1980s
- Ireneusz Czop (born 1968), Polish actor
- Ireneusz Jeleń (born 1981), Polish footballer who plays as a right-winger or striker
- Ireneusz Krosny (born 1968), Polish actor and mime artist
- Ireneusz Kwieciński, Polish judoka
- Ireneusz Paliński (1932–2006), Polish weightlifter
- Ireneusz Raś (born 1972), Polish politician
- Ireneusz Socha (born 1964), drummer, composer

== See also ==
- Irenaeus (disambiguation)
