= Irénée =

Male given name

- Pronunciation: French: [i.ʁe.ne]
- Gender: Male
- Language: French

Origin
- Region of origin: France, Québec

Other names
- Related names: Irenaeus, Irinej, Irineu, Ireneusz

Irénée is a French masculine given name, derived from Irenaeus. It may refer to:

- Charles-Irénée Castel de Saint-Pierre (1658–1743), French writer and radical
- Éleuthère Irénée du Pont (1771–1834), French-born Huguenot chemist and industrialist
- Francis Irénée du Pont (1873–1942), American chemist, and manager at the E.I. du Pont de Nemours Company
- Henri-Irénée Marrou (1904–1977), French historian
- Irénée Berge (1867–1926), French composer
- Irénée-Jules Bienaymé (1796–1878), French statistician
- Irénée du Pont (1876–1963), U.S. businessman, former president of the DuPont company and head of the Du Pont trust
- Irénée Pelletier (1939–1994), Canadian politician
- Irénée Vautrin (1888–1974), Canadian politician
- Irénée-Jules Bienaymé (1796–1878), French statistician

== See also ==
- Irénée-Marie Ecological Reserve, an ecological reserve in Quebec, Canada
- Saint-Irénée, Quebec, a parish municipality in the Capitale-Nationale region of Quebec, Canada
