= Diocese of Irecê =

Catholic ecclesiastical territory

Coordinates: 11.3034°S 41.8571°W

Diocese of Irecê Dioecesis Irecensis Diocese de Irecê

Location
- Country: Brazil
- Ecclesiastical province: Feira de Santana
- Metropolitan: Feira de Santana

Statistics
- Area: 24,065 km^{2} (9,292 sq mi)
- Population: Total; Catholics: (as of 2013); 532,000; 344,000 (64.7%)

Information
- Denomination: Catholic Church
- Rite: Latin Rite
- Established: 28 April 1979 (46 years ago)
- Cathedral: Cathedral of the Good Shepherd in Irecê

Current leadership
- Pope: Leo XIV
- Bishop: Antônio Ederaldo de Santana
- Metropolitan Archbishop: Zanoni Demettino Castro
- Bishops emeritus: Tommaso Cascianelli

Website
- http://www.dioceseirece.com.br/

The Roman Catholic Diocese of Irecê (Latin: Dioecesis Irecensis) is a diocese located in the city of Irecê in the ecclesiastical province of Feira de Santana in Brazil.

== History ==
- April 28, 1979: Established as Diocese of Irecê from the Diocese of Barra and the Diocese of Ruy Barbosa

== Leadership ==
- Bishops of Irecê (Roman rite), in reverse chronological order
  - Bishop Antônio Ederaldo de Santana (2023.09.23 – Present)
  - Bishop Tommaso Cascianelli, C.P. (2000.07.05 – 2023.09.23)
  - Bishop João Maria Messi, O.S.M. (1995.03.22 – 1999.11.17), appointed Bishop of Barra do Piraí-Volta Redonda, Rio de Janeiro
  - Bishop Edgar Carício de Gouvêa (1983.06.13 – 1994.03.02)
  - Bishop Homero Leite Meira (1980.09.24 – 1983.06.13)
