= Diocese of Serrinha =

Catholic ecclesiastical territory

Diocese of Serrinha Dioecesis Serrignensis Diocese de Serrinha

Location
- Country: Brazil
- Ecclesiastical province: Feira de Santana
- Metropolitan: Feira de Santana

Statistics
- Area: 17,169 km^{2} (6,629 sq mi)
- Population: Total; Catholics: (as of 2010); 550,000; 473,000 (86%)

Information
- Denomination: Catholic
- Sui iuris church: Latin Church
- Rite: Roman Rite
- Established: 21 September 2005 (20 years ago)
- Cathedral: Cathedral of Saint Anne in Serrinha

Current leadership
- Pope: Leo XIV
- Bishop: Hélio Pereira dos Santos
- Metropolitan Archbishop: Zanoni Demettino Castro
- Bishops emeritus: Ottorino Assolari, CSF

The Roman Catholic Diocese of Serrinha (Latin: Dioecesis Serrignensis) is located in the Brazilian state of Bahia. It is a suffragan diocese of the Archdiocese of Feira de Santana.

== History ==
The diocese was erected on 21 September 2005 with territory taken from the Archdiocese of Feira de Santana and the Diocese of Paulo Afonso

== Bishops ==
=== Ordinaries ===
- Ottorino Assolari, C.S.F. (21 September 2005 – 3 February 2021)
- Hélio Pereira dos Santos (3 February 2021 - )

=== Coadjutor Bishop ===
- Hélio Pereira dos Santos (16 October 2020 – 3 February 2021)
