= Diocese of Ruy Barbosa =

Catholic ecclesiastical territory

Diocese of Ruy Barbosa Dioecesis Ruibarbosensis Diocese de Barra

Location
- Country: Brazil
- Ecclesiastical province: Feira de Santana
- Metropolitan: Feira de Santana

Statistics
- Area: 25,169 km^{2} (9,718 sq mi)
- Population: Total; Catholics: (as of 2010); 445,000; 357,000 (80.2%)

Information
- Rite: Latin Rite
- Established: 14 November 1959 (66 years ago)
- Cathedral: Cathedral of St Anthony in Rui Barbosa

Current leadership
- Pope: Leo XIV
- Bishop: Estevam dos Santos Silva Filho
- Metropolitan Archbishop: Zanoni Demettino Castro

The Roman Catholic Diocese of Ruy Barbosa (Latin: Dioecesis Ruibarbosensis) is a diocese located in the city of Ruy Barbosa, Bahia in the ecclesiastical province of Feira de Santana in Brazil.

== History ==
- November 14, 1959: Established as Diocese of Ruy Barbosa from the Diocese of Barra, Diocese of Bonfim and Metropolitan Archdiocese of São Salvador da Bahia.

== Leadership ==
- Bishops of Ruy Barbosa (Roman rite)
  - Bishop Epaminondas José de Araújo (1959.12.14 – 1966.10.27), appointed Bishop of Anápolis, Goias
  - Bishop José Adelino Dantas (1967.02.20 – 1975.10.04)
  - Bishop Mathias William Schmidt, O.S.B. (1976.05.14 – 1992.05.24)
  - Bishop André de Witte (1994.06.08 – 2020.04.15)
  - Bishop Estevam dos Santos Silva Filho (2020.04.15 – ...)
