= Orlando Octacílio Dotti =

Brazilian Catholic bishop (born 1930)

Orlando Octacílio Dotti OFM Cap
- Bishop Emeritus of Vacaria
- Church: Catholic Church
- Province: Passo Fundo
- Appointed: 5 February 1986
- Term ended: 12 November 2003
- Predecessor: Henrique Gelain
- Successor: Pedro Sbalchiero Neto
- Other posts: Bishop of Caçador (1969–1976); Bishop of Barra (1976–1983); Coadjutor Bishop of Vacaria (1983–1986)

Orders
- Ordination: 8 April 1956
- Consecration: 25 May 1969 by Afonso Niehues

Personal details
- Born: 22 June 1930 (age 95) Antônio Prado, Rio Grande do Sul, Brazil
- Denomination: Catholic
- Motto: Cor Ad Cor Loquitur

Orlando Octacílio Dotti OFM Cap (born 22 June 1930) is a Brazilian Catholic prelate, who served as Bishop of Caçador (1969–1976), Bishop of Barra (1976–1983), and Bishop of Vacaria (1986–2003). He is Bishop Emeritus of Vacaria.

== Early life and education ==
Dotti was born on 22 June 1930 in the rural locality of Linha Silva Tavares, Antônio Prado, Rio Grande do Sul, Brazil, the son of José Domingos Dotti and Mathilde Miotto Dotti.

He attended primary school between 1937 and 1941 and entered the Capuchin minor seminary in Veranópolis in 1942. He completed classical studies in Ipê (1946–1948) and made his novitiate in Flores da Cunha in 1949. He studied philosophy in Marau (1950–1952) and theology in Garibaldi and Porto Alegre.

He was ordained to the priesthood on 8 April 1956 for the Order of Friars Minor Capuchin.

After ordination, Dotti pursued further studies in English and comparative education at the American Cultural Center in Porto Alegre (1956–1958) and later in Washington, D.C. (1958–1959).

He served as a professor and formator at Capuchin seminaries, teaching in Ipê (1957–1962) and serving as director and professor at the classical seminary in Marau (1962–1964). From 1964 to 1969, he was a professor at the Faculty of Philosophy, Sciences and Letters in Ijuí.

== Episcopal ministry ==
=== Caçador (1969–1976) ===
On 12 March 1969, Pope Paul VI appointed Dotti as the first Bishop of the newly erected Diocese of Caçador, in Santa Catarina. He was consecrated a bishop on 25 May 1969.

During his tenure in Caçador, he organized diocesan structures and promoted pastoral planning, priestly formation, and Catholic education. In 1972, he founded the Faculty of Education, Administration and Public Relations (FEARPE) in Caçador. He also served on the State Education Council of Santa Catarina from 1974 to 1976.

In 2018, he revisited Caçador and gave an interview reflecting on the early years of the diocese and its development.

=== Barra (1976–1983) ===
On 1 April 1976, Dotti was transferred to the Diocese of Barra, in Bahia. He served there until 30 May 1983.

The Diocese of Barra lists him among its former bishops.

During this period, he was active in national ecclesial structures. From 1978 to 1982, he served as coordinator of the Education and Social Action sectors of the National Conference of Brazilian Bishops (CNBB). He was also a member of the Social Action Department of the Latin American Episcopal Council (CELAM).

=== Vacaria (1983–2003) ===
On 30 May 1983, Pope John Paul II appointed Dotti as Coadjutor Bishop of the Diocese of Vacaria. He succeeded as diocesan bishop on 5 February 1986.

As Bishop of Vacaria, he emphasized pastoral organization, lay formation, social engagement, and theological reflection in northeastern Rio Grande do Sul. He served in leadership roles in pastoral organizations, including as president of the Pastoral Land Commission (Comissão Pastoral da Terra) and as a member of Pax Christi International.

His resignation as Bishop of Vacaria was accepted on 12 November 2003.

== Later life ==
After retiring as diocesan bishop, Dotti continued to reside in the Diocese of Vacaria and remained active in pastoral ministry. He served as Apostolic Administrator of Vacaria from 2006 to 2008.

He also continued contributing to theological and pastoral reflection, participating in national seminars and diocesan initiatives.

In 2020, he was awarded the Medalha Zilda Arns by the Municipal Council of Vacaria in recognition of his service to the Church and society.

In 2025, the Diocese of Vacaria celebrated his 95th birthday with a Mass of thanksgiving and the launch of two volumes recounting his pastoral trajectory.
