= Barreiras =

Municipality in Northeast Brazil

- Municipality
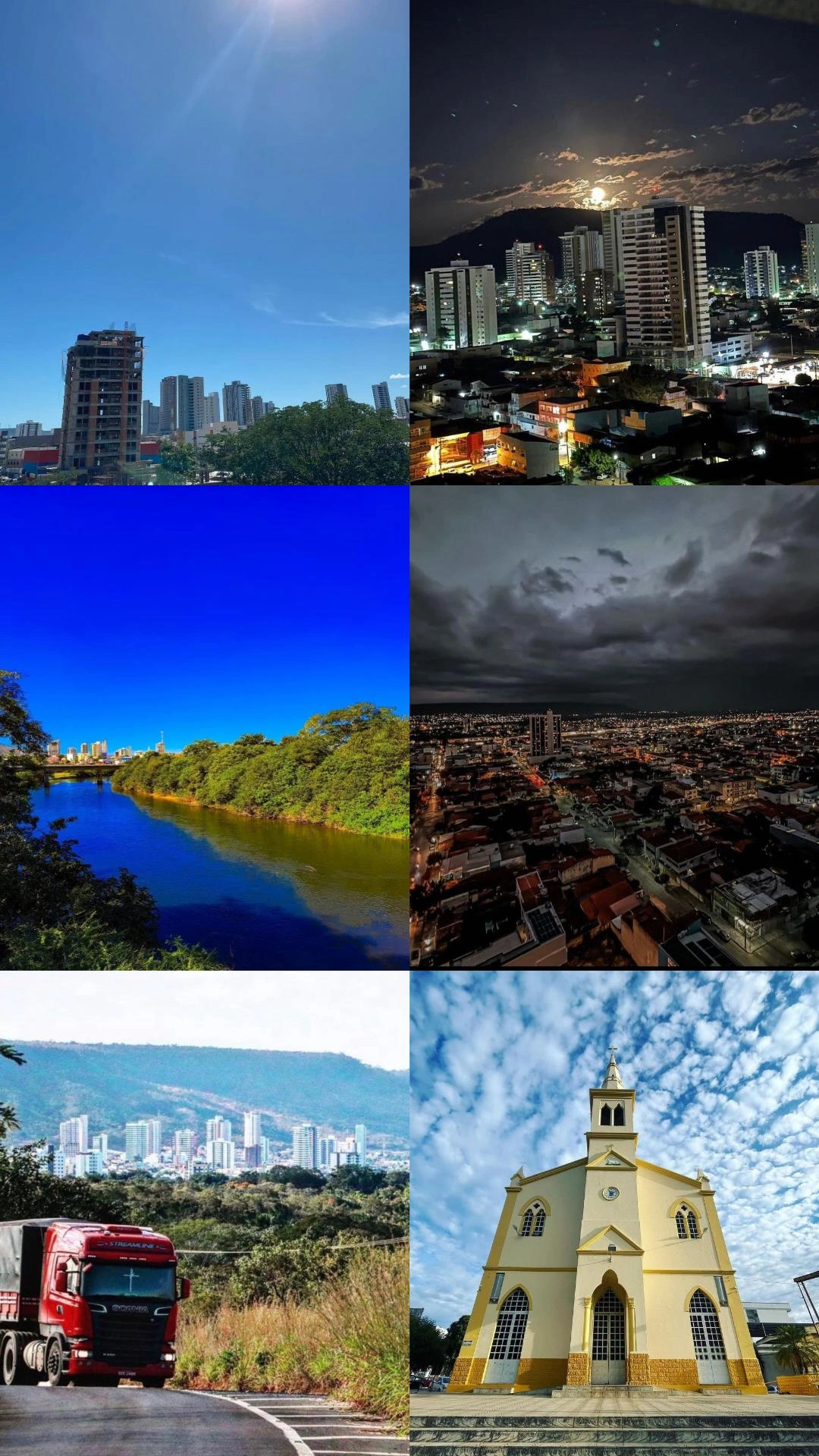
- Barreiras downtown.

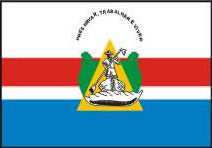
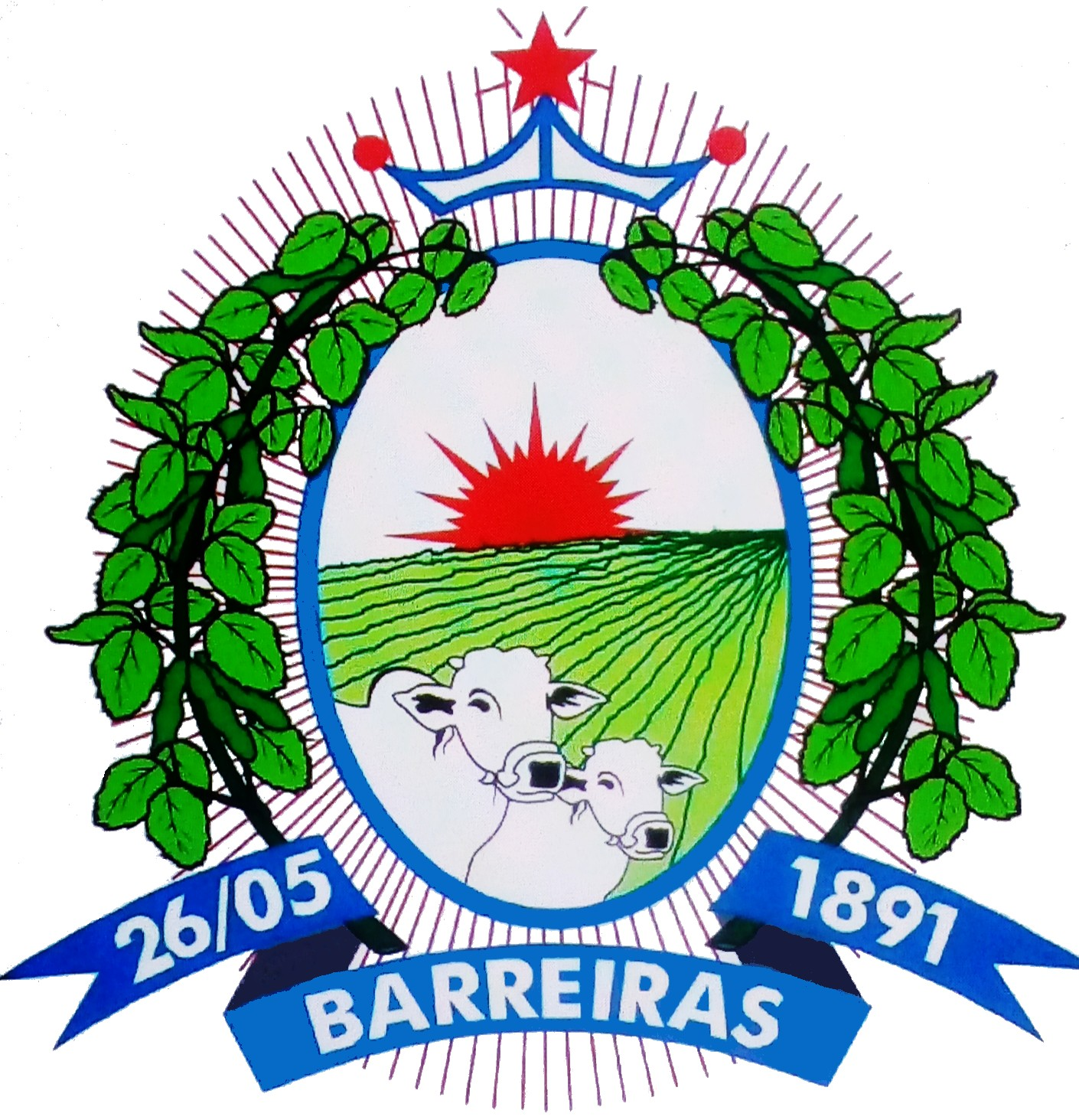
- Flag Coat of arms
- Nickname: "Capital of the West of Bahia"
- Location of Barreiras

- Location within Brazil
- Coordinates: 12°08′54″S 44°59′33″W
- Country: Brazil
- Region: Northeast
- State: Bahia
- Founded: 1891

Area
  - Municipality: 7,985.421 km^{2} (3,083.188 sq mi)
  - Urban: 2,535 km^{2} (979 sq mi)
- Elevation: 454 m (1,490 ft)

Population (2022 Census)
  - Municipality: 159,743
  - Estimate (2025): 171,634
  - Density: 20.0043/km^{2} (51.8110/sq mi)
- Demonym: Barreirense
- Time zone: UTC−3 (BRT)
- Postal Code: 47800
- Area code: +55 77
- Website: barreiras.ba.gov.br (in Portuguese)

Barreiras is a city located in the west of the state of Bahia, Brazil. It is the most important urban, political, technological and economic center of the western region of the state. Its economy is based on livestock raising and agriculture. In recent years it has experienced an economic boom and is one of the fastest-growing cities in the state of Bahia if not in Brazil.

== Geography ==
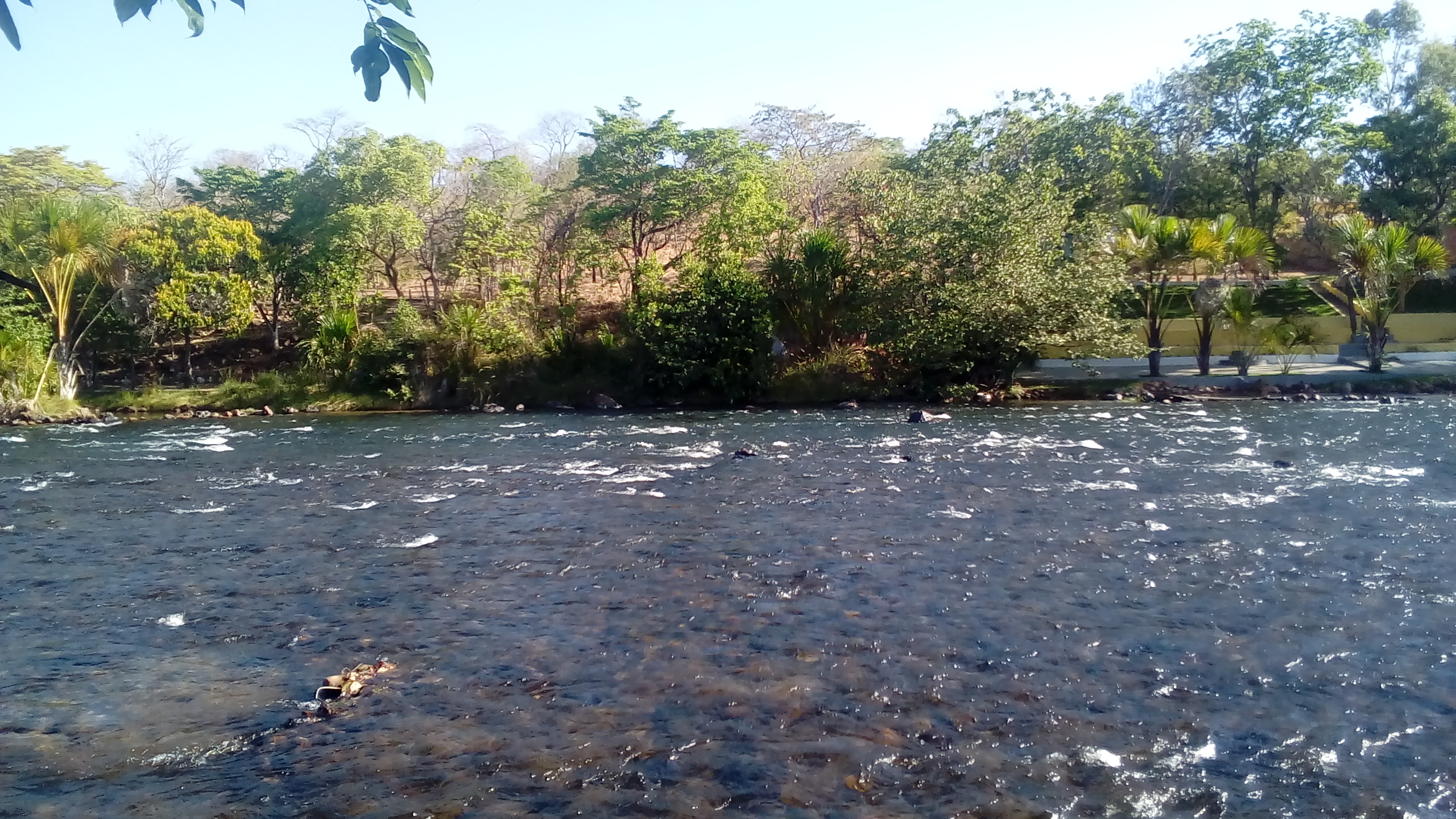
Due to the hot climate in Barreiras, the Rio de Ondas is a tourist point very visited by bathers who seek to refresh themselves and enjoy the natural landscape.

Barreiras is located 853 kilometers from Salvador, the state capital, and 622 kilometers from Brasília, the federal capital. With a population of approximately 157 thousand inhabitants distributed over an area of 7,989 km^{2}, it is an important highway crossroads between the North, Northeast, and the Centerwest of the country. The main highway linking Brasília with Salvador – called BR 020 from Brasília to Barreiras and BR 242 from Barreiras to Salvador – passes through Barreiras. There is also an airport with daily flights to Brasília, Salvador de Bahia and São Paulo. There are no railway connections.

Geographically it is located in the basin of the Rio Grande, which flows north-east into the São Francisco River. Several other large rivers – the Rio de Janeiro, the Rio de Ondas, and the Rio Branco – pass through the municipality.

== History ==
It is not known who founded Barreiras. There is no register of the first inhabitants, either European or Amerindian. The Acroás and Chacriabás were the tribes that lived along the banks of the Iassua, the name they gave to the Rio Grande. They soon disappeared either by disease or war. What is known is that there were some ranches, some as large as districts in Portugal.

Cattle caused the first settlers to penetrate these hostile regions, as the great herds began to advance into unexplored lands, bathed by rivers with clear waters. It was the São Francisco River that first brought explorers up to the vast interior. At the point where the Rio Grande flows into the São Francisco a small settlement called Barras took root. By 1600 adventurers had made their way up the Rio Grande as far as rocks that impeded (barriers) their further passage. Below these rocks, "barreiras" in Portuguese, a small community began. The Rio Grande was navigable by small boats, and traders soon arrived in the region to support the cattle industry and the ranches. The village became an agricultural center producing tobacco, beans, corn and manioc. These were exported together with molasses, rum, manioc meal, and leather while European articles, kerosene and coffee were imported – all commerce being conducted by river.

By 1850 a cluster of huts supplied the boats that arrived on the river. It was called São João de Barreiras. By 1880 it was still only a village of twenty huts made of branches and adobe. The great abundance in the nearby forests of mangabeira, from whose sap rubber was made, was a factor for the growth of the town. The rubber was embarked down river to Salvador.

Ten more years of prosperity meant that in 1891 it became a district of the municipality of Angical. Then it became a vila in 1901, with the municipality being created with territory taken from Angical. Finally in 1902 it acquired the status of city, having at the time more than 630 houses and 2,500 inhabitants.

In 1928 the second hydroelectric station in Bahia was built in Barreiras. Industries began to come to the region. The city that had been practically stagnant for decades now had packing houses, rice and cotton mills, textile factories, and tanning factories. In 1943 a branch of Banco do Brasil opened its doors, the first bank in the city.

The good economic times of Barreiras lasted until 1964. In that year the power plant was closed and the city plunged into chaos. With no means of transport, since the rivers had ceased to be navigable and the airport had been closed, the city remained isolated for almost ten years until the Salvador/Brasília highway was finished. Soon after, the area received irrigation projects financed by the government, and the city began to develop again.

From the decade of the 1970s to the present, the municipality has gone from 20,864 inhabitants to 120,000 and undergone important transformations. It has received public and private investments that have modified the social and economic profile. After 1990 the intense agricultural activity has caused changes in practically all the economic and social sectors.

In 1979, the city was made the seat of the Roman Catholic Diocese of Barreiras.

== Economy ==
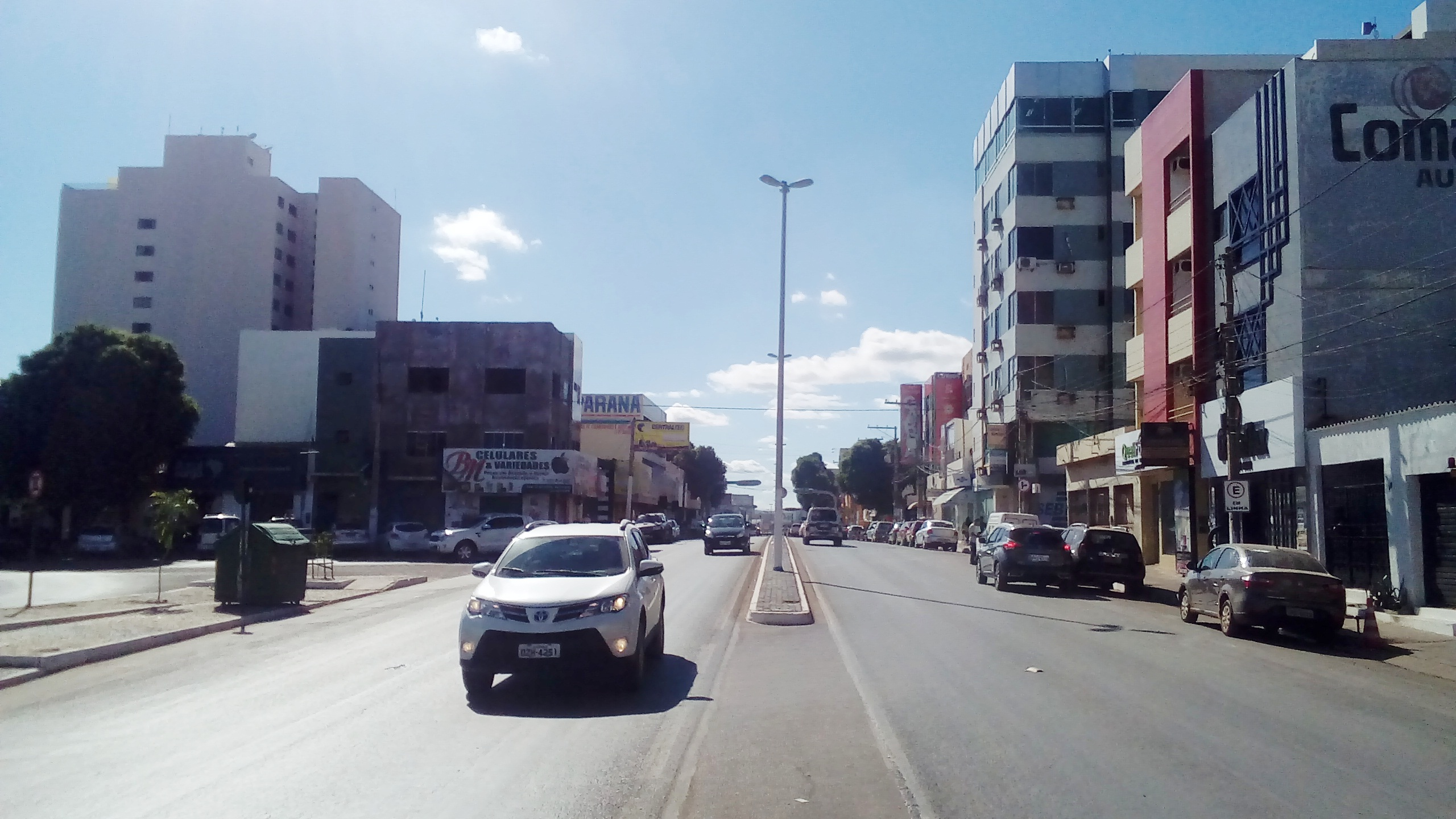
Benedita Silveira Street, Barreiras' downtown

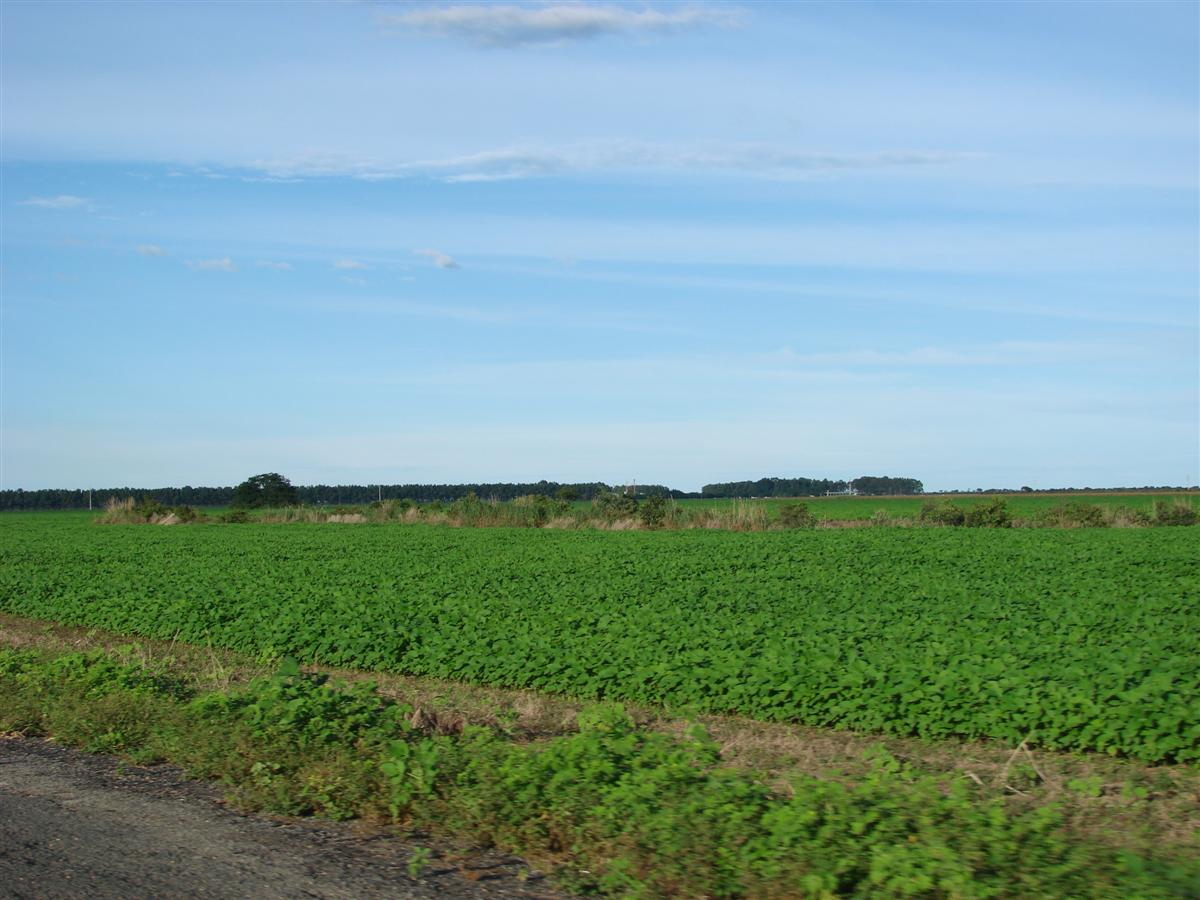
Soy plantation

Barreiras is a major producer of cereals (soybeans and corn), coffee, cotton, and fruits, as well as cattle raising.

Irrigation, the level terrain, and the dry climate with well-defined dry and rainy seasons have made Barreiras a leader in agriculture. Much of the irrigation is done with central pivots.

Out of the 10,000 square kilometers total planted, soybeans represent 67%. 900 producers cultivate 6,900 km^{2}, producing 1.5 million tons, which represents 4.5% of the national production. The total planted area in 2003 was 1455.86 km^{2}. Other crops in planted area:

- corn: 313.19 km^{2}
- rice: 134.11 km^{2}
- cotton: 136.53 km^{2}
- sugarcane: 4.2 km^{2}
- beans: 45.5 km^{2}
- manioc: 55 km^{2}
- sorghum: 24 km^{2}

Data are from IBGE

Barreiras has become an alternative area to coffee production in Brazil. After coffee was introduced eight years ago, the planted area has already surpassed 40.89 km^{2}. The region has a potential area of 1,000 km^{2} for irrigated coffee, of which 500 km^{2} have central pivots easily adapted to the planting of coffee. In the harvest of 2003 the production was 11,249 tons.

Irrigated fruit has reached excellent results and is competing in national and international markets. The main fruits are papaya, mango, lemons and oranges, guava, and coconut. Production not only supplies the national market but lemons, mangoes and papayas are exported to Europe and Canada. The planted area of the fruit is:

- papaya: 5.3 km^{2}
- mango: 1.2 km^{2}
- coconut: 2.89 km^{2}
- guava: 0.28 km^{2}
- oranges: 1.33 km^{2}
- lemon: 1.35 km^{2}
- tangerine: 0.55 km^{2}
- grapes: 0.05 km^{2}

Going along with the development of agriculture traditional cattle raising gave way in the 1990s to the use of high technology, with cultivated pastures in corrected areas; the raising of more productive breeds; maintenance of the herd with the use of mineral supplements; periodical vaccination and the use of modern techniques like embryo transfer and artificial insemination to improve the genetic quality; confinement and semi-confinement; the production of early heifers and pastures irrigated by pivot.

The bovine herd of the region is estimated in 55,215 head. Beef cattle make up 70% of the herd and the other 30% is dairy cattle.

The main breeds raised are: Nelore, Brown Swiss, Frisian, Limmousin, Chianina, Guzerá, Girolanda, Canchim, Marchigiana, Simental, Jersey and Santa Gertrudis.

== Infrastructure ==
Barreiras has one retransmitting television station, three radio stations, and several newspapers. There are 27 post offices and 22 thousand telephone terminals installed. There are 194 schools in the school system and three post-secondary school colleges. There is a regional hospital with 168 beds.

The region is supplied by two hydroelectric plants, Correntina with capacity for 8,000 kW and Alto das Fêmeas with capacity for 10,000 kW, a network with 1,200 transmission lines, 19 substations and 85,547 urban and rural consumers.

Federal highway BR-242 links Barreiras eastward to the state capital of Salvador and westward to highway BR-020 at the town of Luís Eduardo Magalhães, from where one can go southwest to the national capital, Brasília, or northeast to Teresina and Fortaleza. The city is also served by Barreiras Airport (IATA: BRA, ICAO: SNBR), with regular scheduled lines to Salvador, Brasília and other Brazilian cities.

== Tourist attractions ==
- Acaba Vidas Waterfall - Formed by the Rio de Janeiro, with 36 meters of free fall, it is surrounded by an exuberant vegetation of ferns and secular trees and a constant mist.
- Redondo Waterfall - paths with buriti palms and dense forest lead the visitor to this waterfall formed by the Rio de Janeiro. Its fall forms a great pool of crystalline waters.
- Rio Grande - Crossing the city of Barreiras, it is the longest tributary on the left bank of the São Francisco. From the city there are 551 kilometers of navigable waters to Barra where it meets the São Francisco.
- Rio de Janeiro - it is born in the municipality of Barreiras near the Serra Geral, and crosses savanna lands and valleys forming several pools and the waterfalls of Acaba Vidas and Redondo until it joins the Rio Branco.
- Rio Branco - it is born near the Serra Geral in the municipality of Barreiras. It flows into the Rio Grande, some kilometers below the center of the city.
- Rio de Ondas - with its clear waters it is one of the main recreation areas of the city. The most important clubs, resorts, and small farms are located on its banks. With rapids and waves that gave it its name it is much used by tourists who go down the river in canoes or tire tubes.

== Notable people ==
- Luiz Razia, racing driver

== Climate ==
Climate data for Barreiras (1991–2020)
Month	Jan	Feb	Mar	Apr	May	Jun	Jul	Aug	Sep	Oct	Nov	Dec	Year
Mean daily maximum °C (°F)	31.9 (89.4)	31.6 (88.9)	31.7 (89.1)	32.1 (89.8)	32.5 (90.5)	32.2 (90.0)	32.4 (90.3)	33.9 (93.0)	35.7 (96.3)	35.8 (96.4)	33.0 (91.4)	32.1 (89.8)	32.9 (91.2)
Daily mean °C (°F)	26.3 (79.3)	26.1 (79.0)	26.3 (79.3)	26.5 (79.7)	26.8 (80.2)	26.9 (80.4)	26.8 (80.2)	27.1 (80.8)	27.3 (81.1)	27.3 (81.1)	27.4 (81.3)	27.0 (80.6)	26.8 (80.2)
Mean daily minimum °C (°F)	21.0 (69.8)	20.9 (69.6)	21.0 (69.8)	20.5 (68.9)	18.7 (65.7)	16.3 (61.3)	15.2 (59.4)	16.1 (61.0)	18.9 (66.0)	21.4 (70.5)	21.6 (70.9)	21.0 (69.8)	19.4 (66.9)
Average precipitation mm (inches)	172.2 (6.78)	135.1 (5.32)	152.3 (6.00)	71.6 (2.82)	18.3 (0.72)	2.7 (0.11)	0.6 (0.02)	0.6 (0.02)	10.1 (0.40)	57.2 (2.25)	169.0 (6.65)	186.2 (7.33)	975.9 (38.42)
Average precipitation days (≥ 1.0 mm)	11	10	11	7	2	0	0	0	2	5	11	11	70
Source: Instituto Nacional de Meteorologia

== See also ==
- List of municipalities in Bahia
