= Silvério Paulo de Albuquerque =

Brazilian bishop (1917–2013)

Silvério Paulo de Albuquerque, O.F.M.
- Bishop of Archdiocese of Feira de Santana (emeritus)
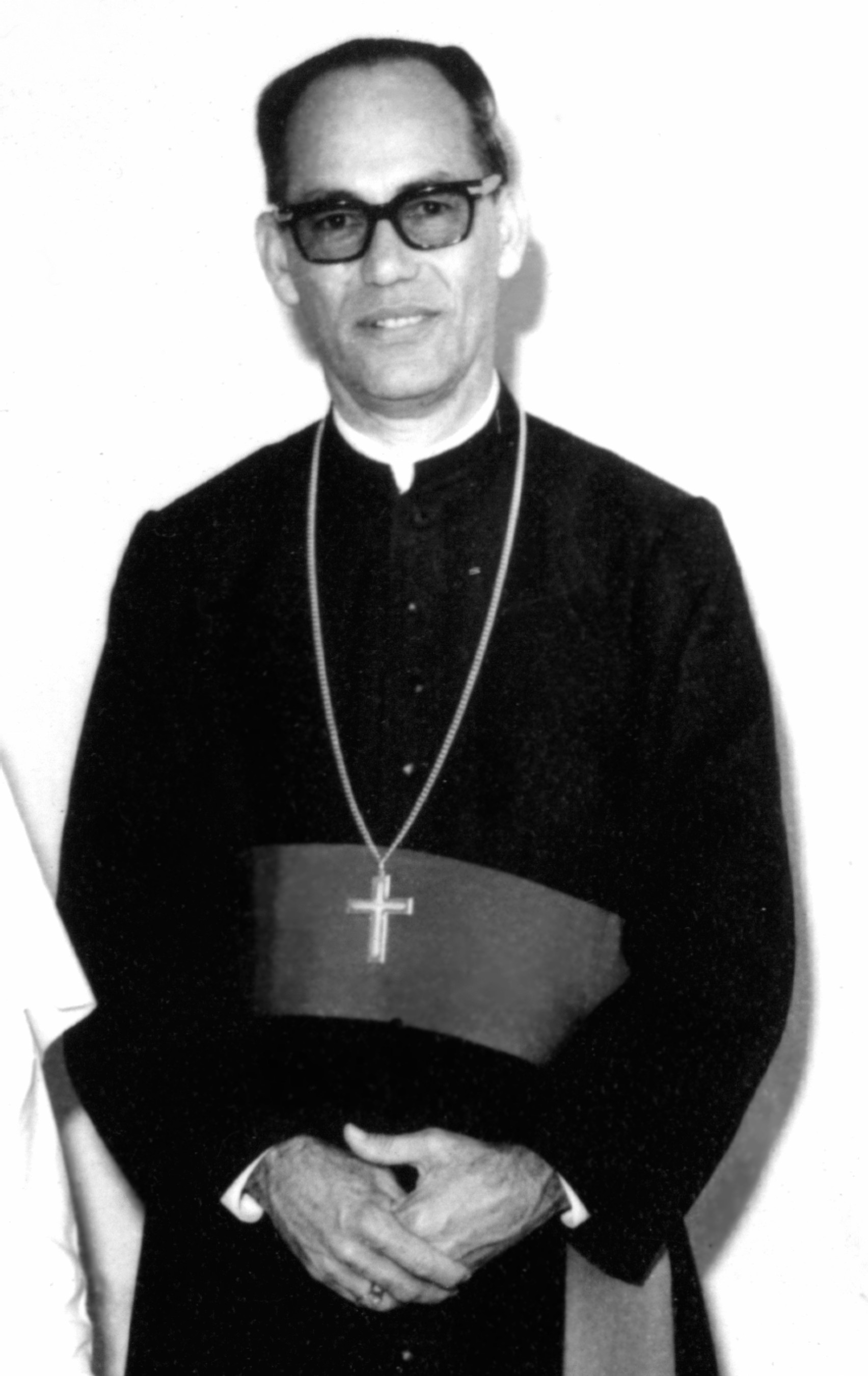
- Silvério Paulo de Albuquerque, O.F.M.
- Church: Roman Catholic Church
- See: Archdiocese of Feira de Santana
- In office: 1973 - 1995
- Predecessor: Jackson Berenguer Prado
- Successor: Itamar Navildo Vian
- Previous post(s): Bishop

Orders
- Ordination: May 30, 1942

Personal details
- Born: March 11, 1917; Olinda, Brazil
- Died: May 28, 2013 (aged 96)

Silvério Paulo de Albuquerque, O.F.M. (March 11, 1917 – May 28, 2013) was a Brazilian bishop of the Roman Catholic Church.

Paulo de Albuquerque was born in Olinda, Brazil on March 11, 1917, and was ordained a priest on May 30, 1942, with the Roman Catholic order of Orders of Friar Minor. Paulo de Albuquerque was appointed bishop of the Diocese of Caetité on March 17, 1970, and ordained bishop on May 10, 1970. On January 18, 1973, he was appointed bishop of the Archdiocese of Feira de Santana and remained there until his retirement on February 22, 1995. He died on May 28, 2013.
