= Homero Leite Meira =

Brazilian Roman Catholic bishop

- Bishop of Irecê
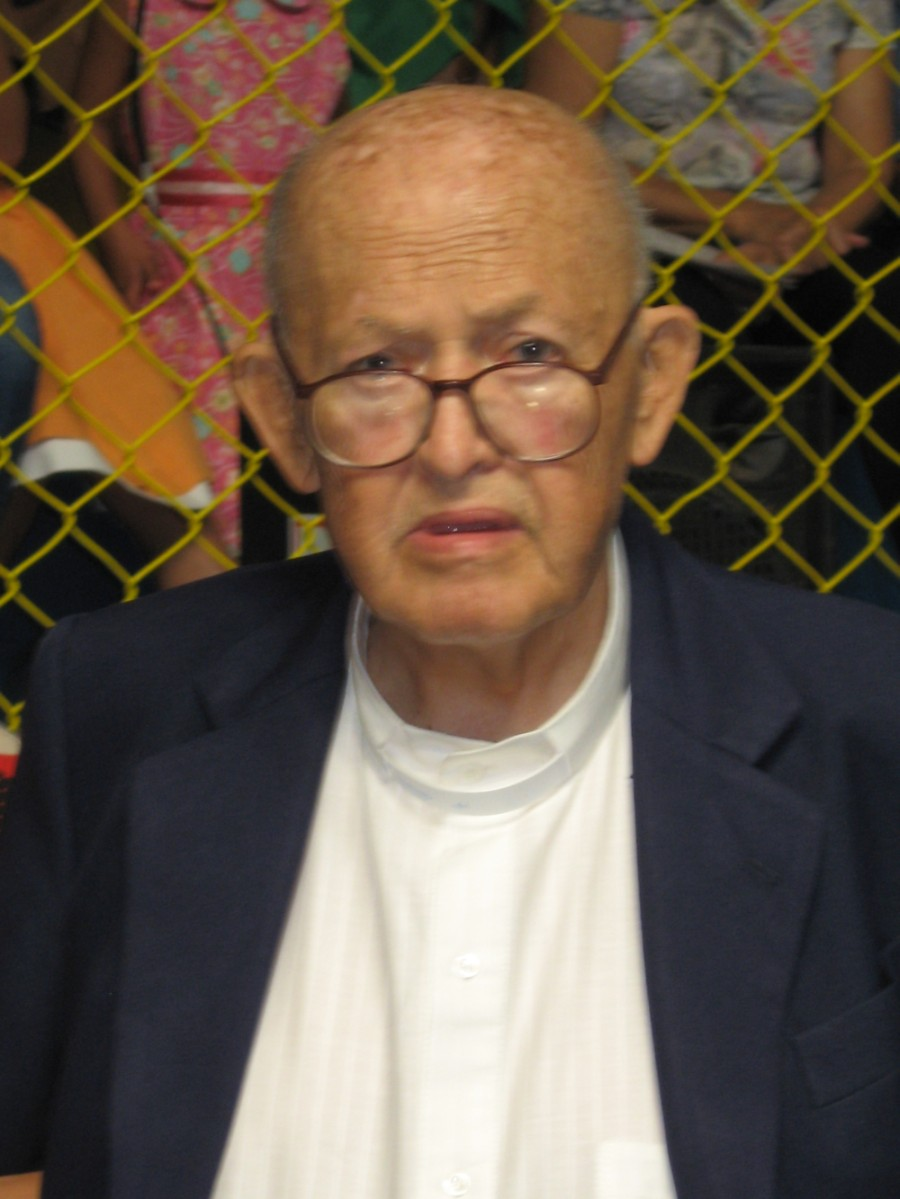
- Church: Catholic Church
- Diocese: Diocese of Irecê
- In office: 24 September 1980 – 13 June 1983
- Predecessor: Diocese erected
- Successor: Edgar Carício de Gouveia
- Previous post: Bishop of Itabuna (1978-1980)

Orders
- Ordination: 8 December 1955
- Consecration: 27 December 1978 by Eliseu Gomes de Oliveira

Personal details
- Born: 2 December 1931 Brumado, Bahia, Brazil
- Died: 8 May 2014 (aged 82)

Homero Leite Meira (2 December 1931 – 8 May 2014) was a Brazilian Roman Catholic bishop.

Ordained to the priesthood in 1955, Leite Meira was appointed bishop of the Diocese of Itabuna in 1978. He was transferred as bishop of the Irecê Diocese in 1980 and resigned in 1983.
