= Augusto Petró =

Brazilian bishop

- Bishop of Diocese of Uruguaiana (emeritus)
- Church: Roman Catholic Church
- See: Diocese of Uruguaiana
- In office: 1964–1995
- Predecessor: Luiz Felipe de Nadal
- Successor: Pedro Ercílio Simon
- Previous post(s): Bishop of Diocese of Vacaria

Orders
- Ordination: November 30, 1944

Personal details
- Born: May 3, 1918; Santo Antônio da Patrulha, RS, Brazil
- Died: October 28, 2008 (aged 90); Ivoti, RS, Brazil

Augusto Petró (May 3, 1918 – October 28, 2008) was a Brazilian bishop of the Roman Catholic Church and was one of oldest bishops in the Catholic Church and one of oldest Brazilian bishops.

Petró was born in Santo Antônio da Patrulha, Rio Grande do Sul, and was ordained a priest on November 30, 1944. He was appointed bishop of the Diocese of Vacaria on May 16, 1958, and ordained a bishop on July 27, 1958. On March 12, 1964, he was appointed bishop of the Diocese of Uruguaiana and remained there until his retirement on July 5, 1995.

He died in a hospital in the Rio Grande do Sul town of Ivoti.
