= Serrinha =

Municipality of Bahia State, Brazil

- Municipality of Bahia, Brazil
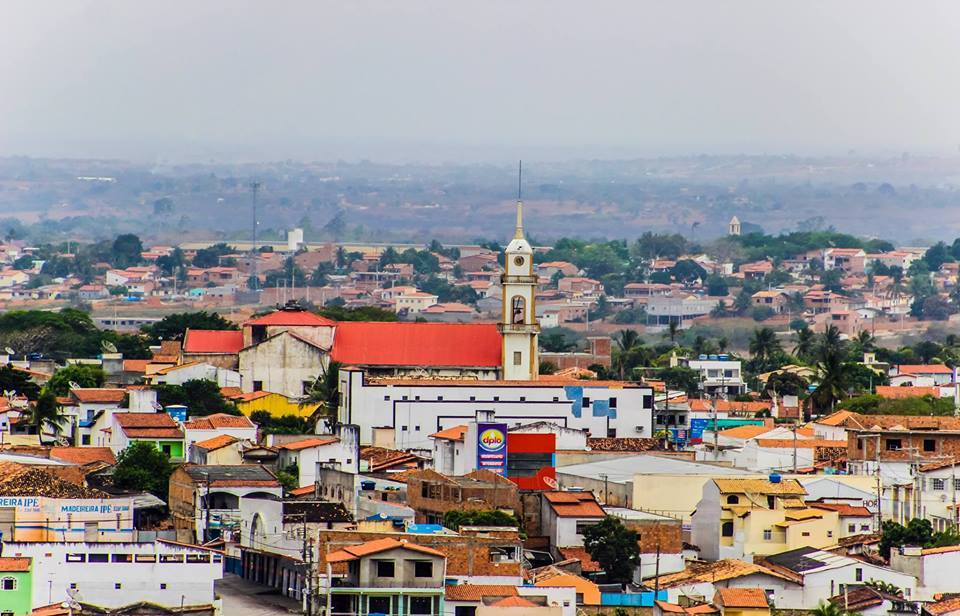
- Aerial view of downtown Serrinha

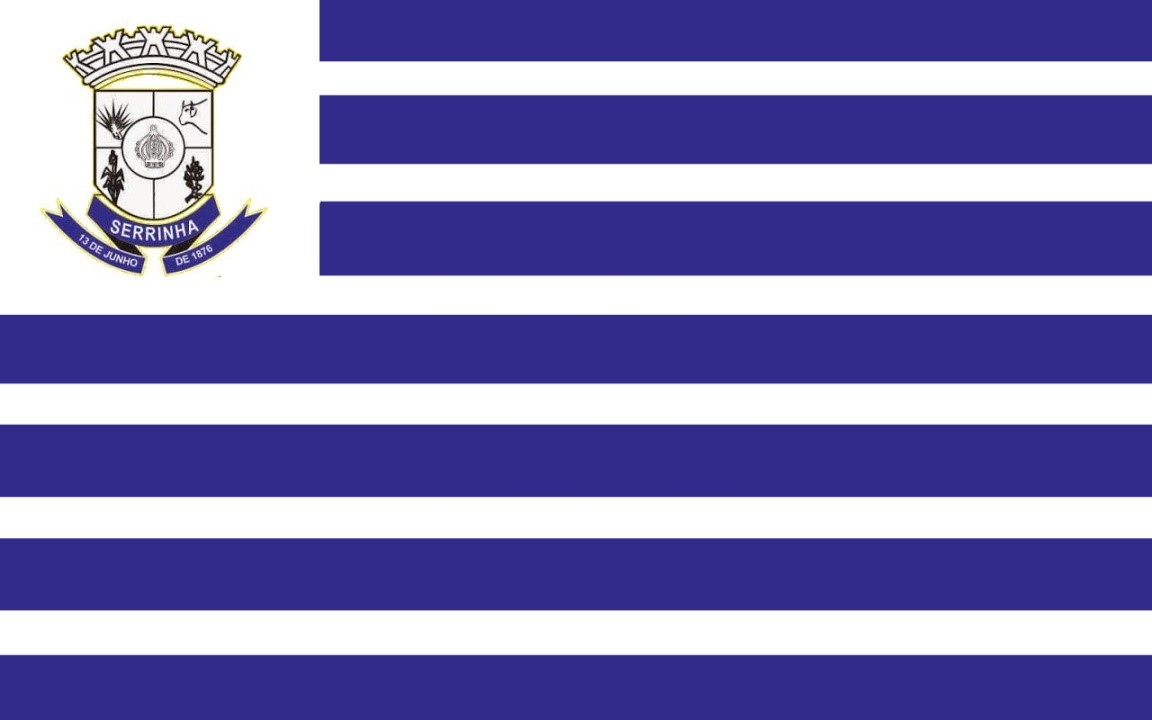
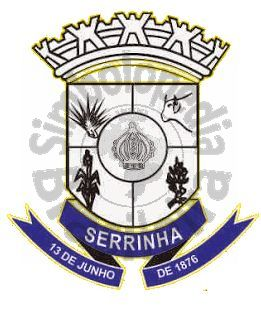
- Flag Coat of arms

- Location of Serrinha in Bahia

- Location within Brazil Location within South America
- Coordinates: 11°39′50″S 39°0′28″W
- Country: Brazil
- Region: Northeast
- State: Bahia
- Founded: 13 June 1876

Government
  - Mayor: Cyro Oliveira Silva Novais (MDB) (2025-2028)
  - Vice Mayor: Givaldo da Silva Lopes (PT) (2025-2028)

Area
  - Total: 583.314 km^{2} (225.219 sq mi)
- Elevation: 379 m (1,243 ft)

Population (2022)
  - Total: 80,435
  - Density: 137.89/km^{2} (357.1/sq mi)
- Demonym: Serrinhense (Portuguese)
- Time zone: UTC-03:00 (Brasília Time)
- Postal code: 48700-000
- HDI (2010): 0.634 – medium
- Website: serrinha.ba.gov.br

"Serrinha" is also the name of a microregion in Bahia.

Serrinha is a city in the state of Bahia, in eastern Brazil.

== Geography ==
The population is 81,286 people. The mayor is Cyro Oliveira Silva Novais of the Brazilian Democratic Movement.

The city is the seat of the Roman Catholic Diocese of Serrinha.

== History ==
The town's founding date is 13 June 1876.

== Climate ==
Climate data for Serrinha (1981–2010)
Month	Jan	Feb	Mar	Apr	May	Jun	Jul	Aug	Sep	Oct	Nov	Dec	Year
Mean daily maximum °C (°F)	33.2 (91.8)	33.3 (91.9)	32.7 (90.9)	31.1 (88.0)	29.0 (84.2)	27.0 (80.6)	26.7 (80.1)	27.2 (81.0)	29.3 (84.7)	31.4 (88.5)	32.4 (90.3)	33.0 (91.4)	30.5 (86.9)
Daily mean °C (°F)	26.1 (79.0)	26.3 (79.3)	26.2 (79.2)	25.1 (77.2)	23.7 (74.7)	22.1 (71.8)	21.5 (70.7)	21.6 (70.9)	23.0 (73.4)	24.6 (76.3)	25.4 (77.7)	26.0 (78.8)	24.3 (75.7)
Mean daily minimum °C (°F)	21.4 (70.5)	21.7 (71.1)	21.8 (71.2)	21.2 (70.2)	20.3 (68.5)	18.8 (65.8)	18.1 (64.6)	17.8 (64.0)	18.7 (65.7)	20.1 (68.2)	20.9 (69.6)	21.4 (70.5)	20.2 (68.4)
Average precipitation mm (inches)	71.0 (2.80)	56.2 (2.21)	83.1 (3.27)	69.6 (2.74)	71.3 (2.81)	95.2 (3.75)	67.6 (2.66)	54.4 (2.14)	38.6 (1.52)	38.2 (1.50)	63.4 (2.50)	65.7 (2.59)	774.3 (30.48)
Average precipitation days (≥ 1.0 mm)	6	6	8	9	10	14	13	11	6	5	5	5	98
Average relative humidity (%)	69.1	69.6	71.4	77.4	82.1	86.0	84.7	82.4	76.3	71.0	69.2	69.0	75.7
Mean monthly sunshine hours	229.8	201.5	212.9	178.9	158.1	123.7	142.8	156.8	175.8	202.0	202.0	215.5	2,199.8
Source: Instituto Nacional de Meteorologia

== Gallery ==
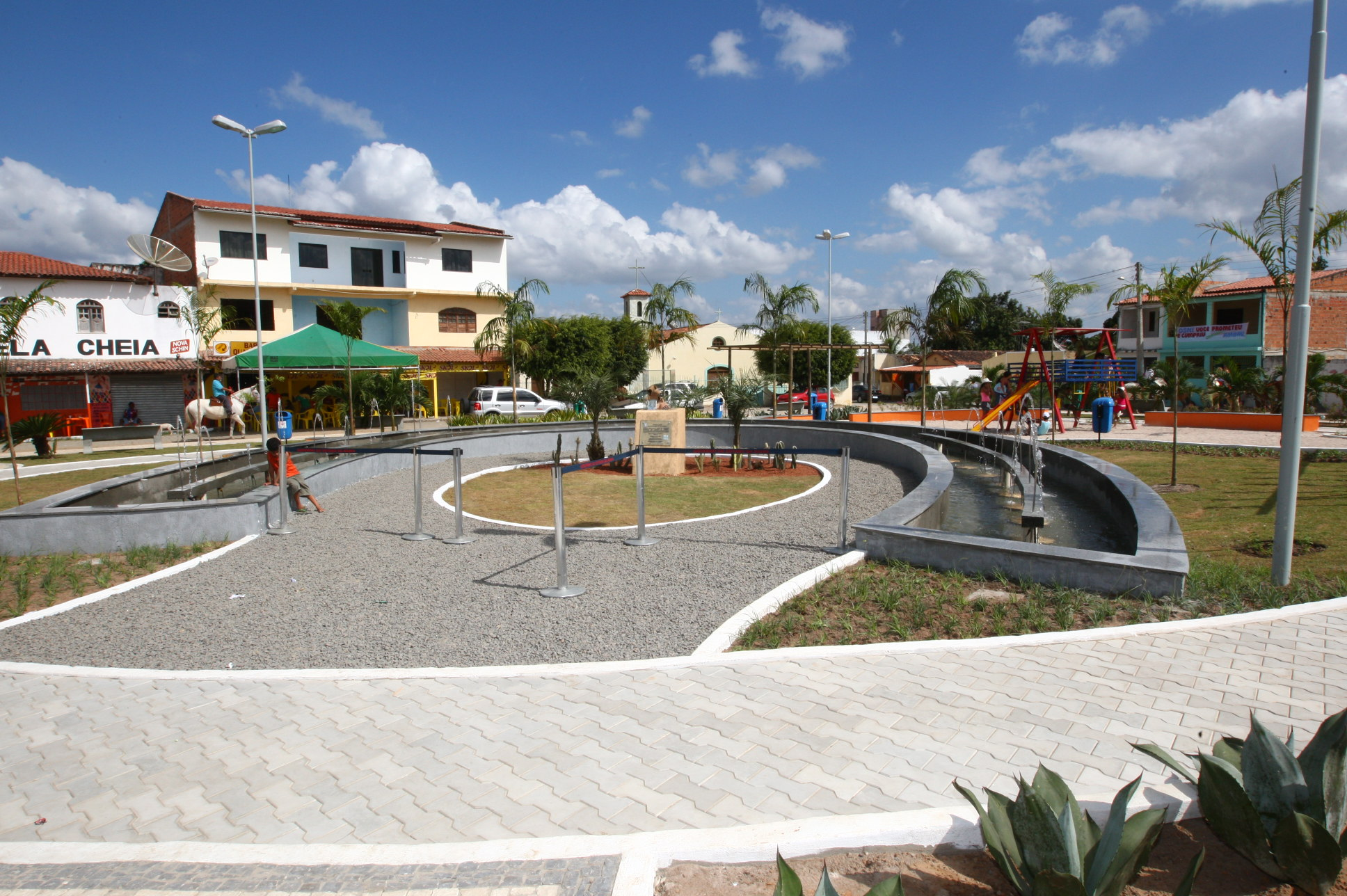
Plaza of the Vaqueiro

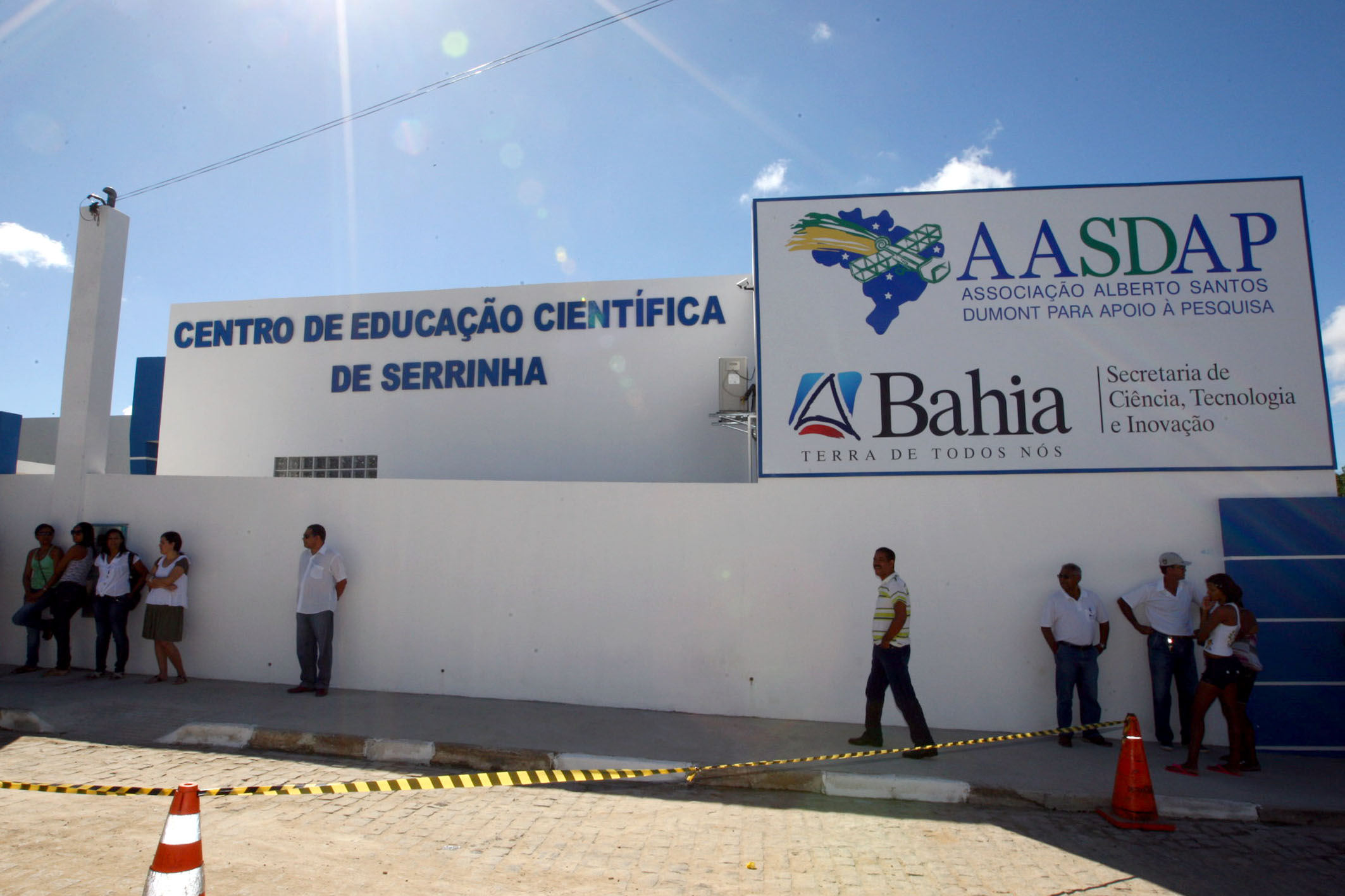
Formerly the Center of Scientific Education of Serrinha (as shown in image), now the Youth Center for Science and Culture of Serrinha

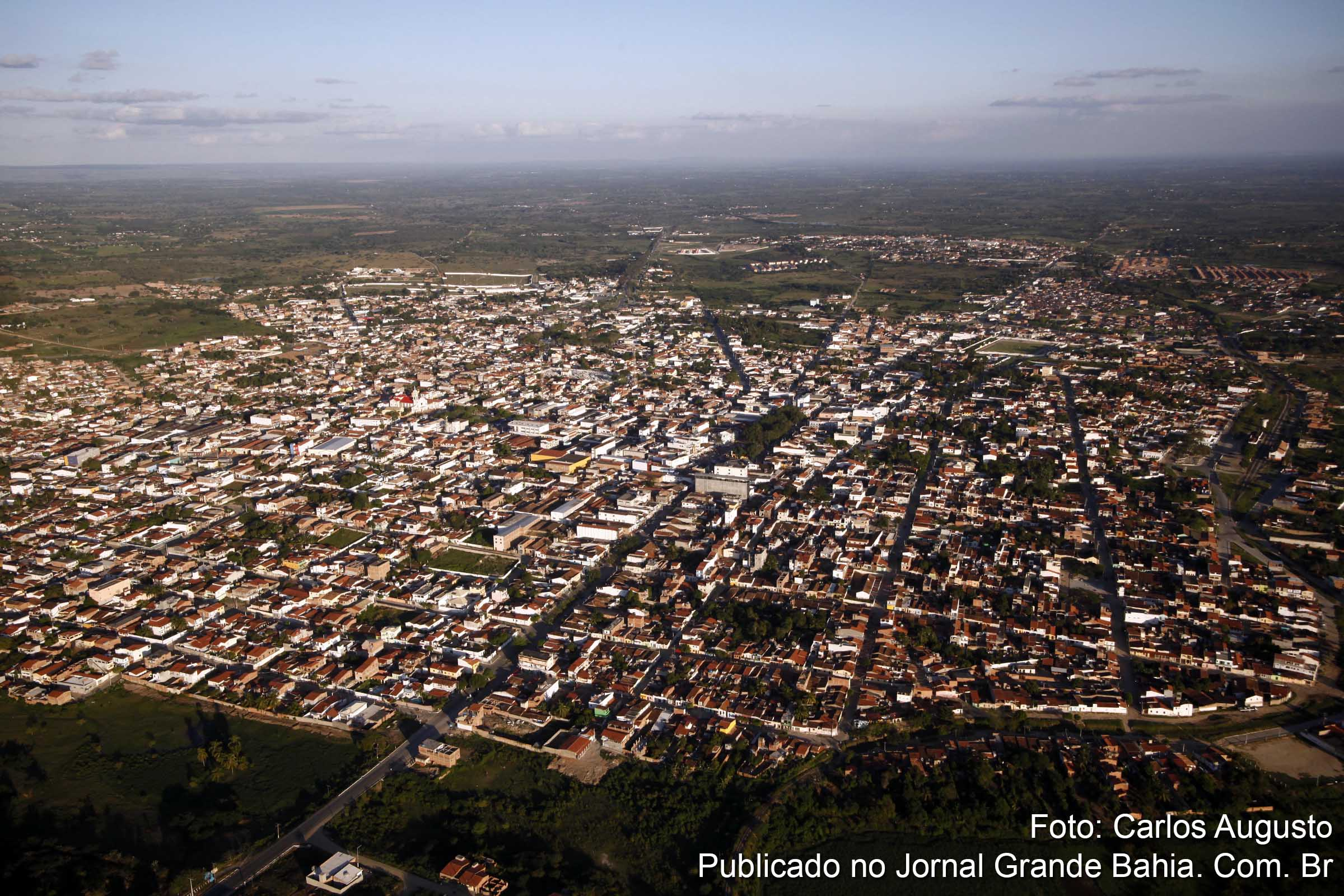
Aerial view of Serrinha
