= Ricardo José Weberberger =

Ricardo José Weberberger OSB
- Bishop of Barreiras
- Native name: Richard Josef Weberberger
- Church: Catholic Church
- Diocese: Diocese of Barreiras
- In office: 21 May 1979 – 17 August 2010
- Predecessor: Diocese erected
- Successor: Josafá Menezes da Silva

Orders
- Ordination: 17 August 1958
- Consecration: 15 August 1964 by Paul Augustin Mayer

Personal details
- Born: 5 September 1939 Bad Leonfelden, State of Austria, Nazi Germany
- Died: 17 August 2010 (aged 70) Linz, Upper Austria, Austria

Ricardo José Weberberger (5 September 1939 – 17 August 2010) was the Roman Catholic bishop of the Roman Catholic Diocese of Barreiras, Brazil.

Born in Austria, Weberberger was ordained a priest for the Benedictine order on 15 August 1964. On 21 May 1979 Weberberger was appointed bishop of the Barreiras Diocese and was ordained bishop on 11 July 1979, dying while in office.
