= André de Witte =

Belgian priest (1944–2021)

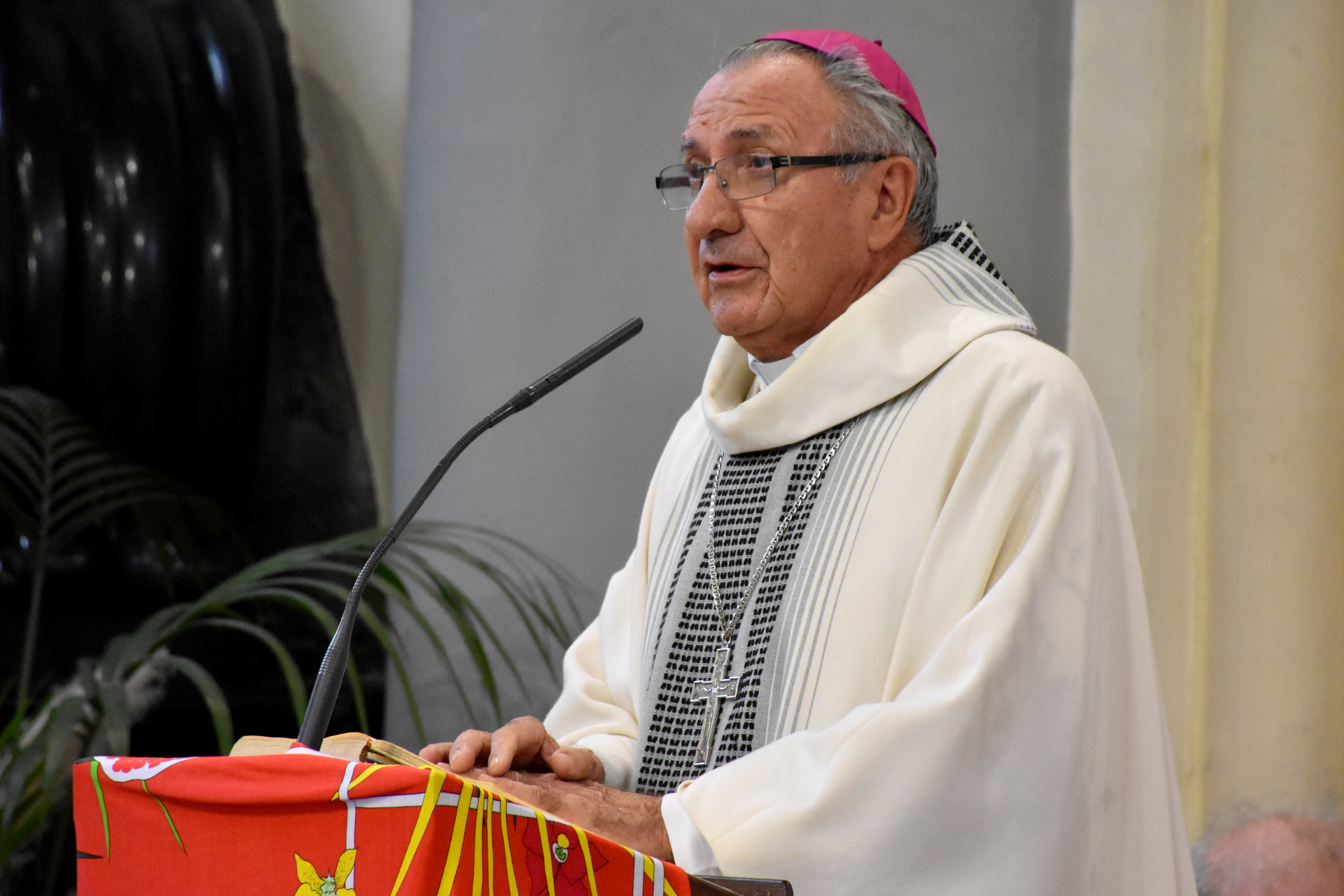
- Born: 31 December 1944; Scheldewindeke, East Flanders, Belgium
- Died: 25 April 2021 (aged 76); Salvador (Bahia), Brazil
- Education: College for Latin America in Leuven (Louvain), Belgium
- Occupations: Priest; Bishop of Ruy Barbosa (emeritus)
- Predecessor: Mathias William Schmidt

André de Witte (31 December 1944 – 25 April 2021) was a Roman Catholic bishop, originally from Belgium. He served as the Bishop of Ruy Barbosa, Bahia in northeastern Brazil from 1994 to retirement in 2020.

== Life ==
André De Witte was born into a farming family in the village of Scheldewindeke, in the intensively developed countryside to the south of Ghent. He was the third child of Armand and Agnes de Witte (born Agnes Delbeke, 1906–1983).

He undertook his studies for the priesthood in response to the call of Pope Pius XII in the encyclical Fidei donum, attending the College for Latin America in Leuven (Louvain) where he was ordained on 6 July 1968. During the next few years he worked as an agricultural engineer in Leuven (Louvain). In 1973 he embarked on a two-year interneeship for the priesthood in Zwijndrecht.

At the end of January 1976 de Witte left for Brazil, arriving on 12 February. For the next 18 years he worked in the rural parish of Inhambupe in the newly formed Roman Catholic Diocese of Alagoinhas. During this period he served as an episcopal vicar for the Sertão, spiritual director of the seminarians, diocesan coordinator of the rural region and vicar general.

On 8 June 1994, André de Witte was nominated as the fourth bishop of the diocese of Ruy Barbosa: on 28 August he was consecrated by the Archbishop of São Salvador da Bahia, Cardinal Lucas Moreira Neves, OP. Principal co-consecrators were the bishops Jaime Mota de Farias and, from Belgium, Arthur Luysterman. Bishop de Witte embarked on his episcopal mission on 18 September 1994, taking as his episcopal motto, "Cristo Sempre" (Always in Christ).

Between 1995 and 2003 de Witte served as chairman of the SPM (Serviço Pastoral dos Migrantes). He also became the president of the Juazeiro-based IRPAA (Instituto Regional da Pequena Agropecuária Apropriada). In addition, he represented the Roman Catholic church in the CESE (Coordenadoria Ecumênica de Serviços).

In 2000 Ruy Barbosa and Ghent became sister dioceses.

In 2015 Dom André was elected vice-chair of the Country Commission("Comissão Pastoral da Terra" / CPT) of the Brazilian bishops.

André De Witte died on 25 April 2021, in the hospital at Salvador (Bahia). He was 76.
