= Diocese of Barreiras =

Catholic ecclesiastical territory

Coordinates: 12.1482°S 44.9994°W

Diocese of Barreiras Dioecesis Barreriensis Diocese de Barreiras
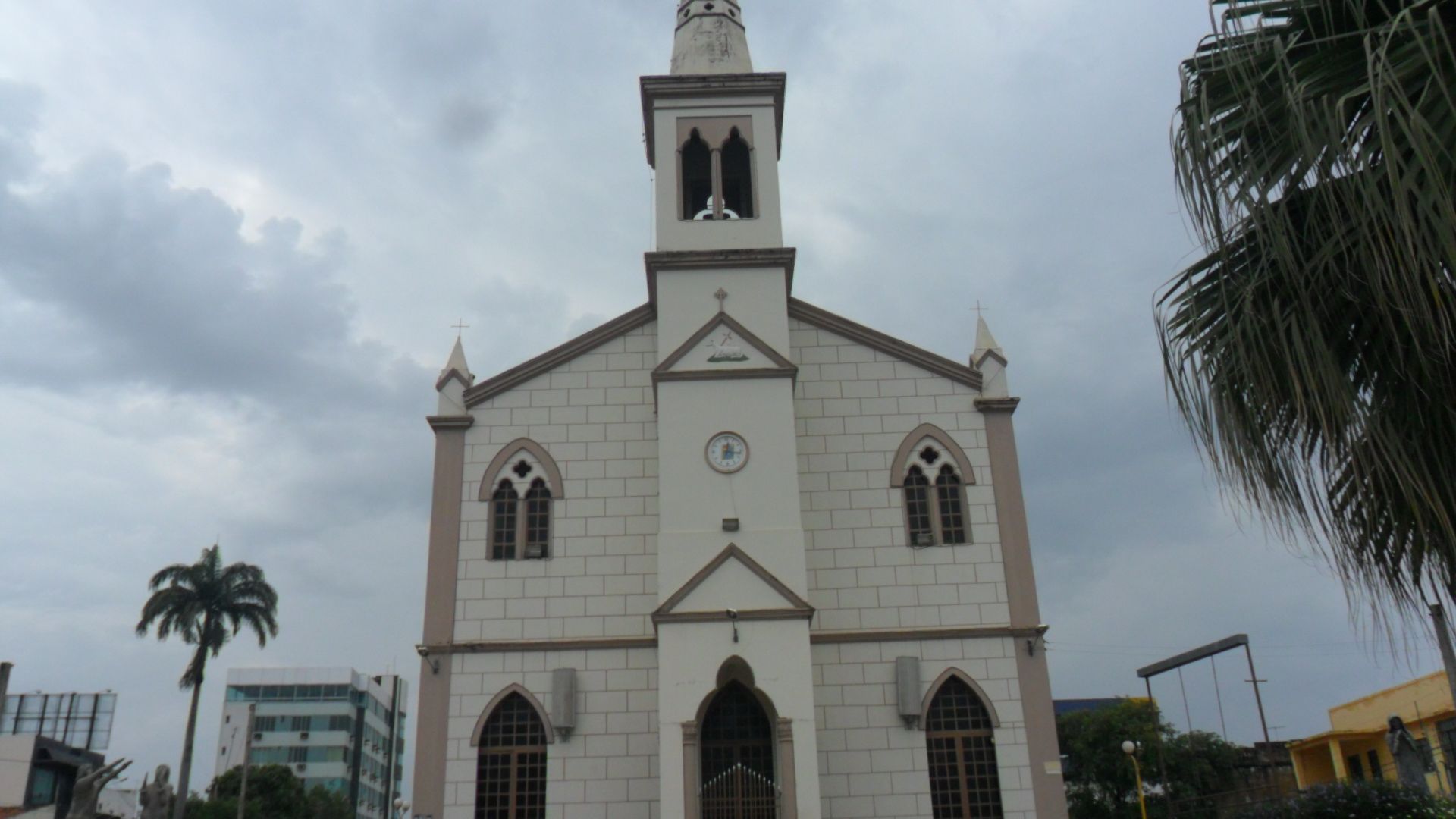
- Metropolitan Cathedral of St. John the Baptist

Location
- Country: Brazil
- Ecclesiastical province: Feira de Santana
- Metropolitan: Feira de Santana

Statistics
- Area: 72,675 km^{2} (28,060 sq mi)
- Population: Total; Catholics: (as of 2012); 355,000; 320,000 (90.1%)

Information
- Denomination: Catholic Church
- Rite: Latin Rite
- Established: 21 May 1979 (47 years ago)
- Cathedral: Cathedral of St John the Baptist in Barreiras

Current leadership
- Pope: Leo XIV
- Bishop: Moacir Silva Arantes
- Metropolitan Archbishop: Zanoni Demettino Castro

The Roman Catholic Diocese of Barreiras (Latin: Dioecesis Barreriensis) is a diocese located in the city of Barreiras in the ecclesiastical province of Feira de Santana in Brazil.

== History ==
- May 21, 1979: Established as Diocese of Barreiras from the Diocese of Barra

== Bishops ==
Bishops of Barreiras (Latin rite)

- Ricardo José Weberberger, O.S.B. (21 May 1979 – 17 August 2010)
- Josafa Menezes da Silva (15 December 2010 – 9 October 2019), appointed Archbishop of Vitória da Conquista, Bahia
- Moacir Silva Arantes (21 October 2020 – Present)

=== Other priests of this diocese who became bishops ===
- Paulo Romeu Dantas Bastos, appointed Bishop of Alagoinhas, Bahia in 2002
- Eraldo Bispo da Silva, appointed Bishop of Patos, Paraiba in 2012
