= Diocese of Caraguatatuba =

Catholic ecclesiastical territory

Coordinates: 23.6343°S 45.4264°W

Diocese of Caraguatatuba Dioecesis Caraguatatubensis Diocese de Caraguatatuba

Catholic
- Cathedral of the Holy Spirit

Location
- Country: Brazil
- Ecclesiastical province: Aparecida

Statistics
- Area: 1,992 km^{2} (769 sq mi)
- Population: Total; Catholics: (as of 2004); 248,362; 155,400

Information
- Sui iuris church: Latin Church
- Rite: Roman Rite
- Established: 3 March 1999 (27 years ago)
- Cathedral: Cathedral of the Holy Spirit in Caraguatatuba

Current leadership
- Pope: Leo XIV
- Bishop: José Carlos Chacorowski

Map
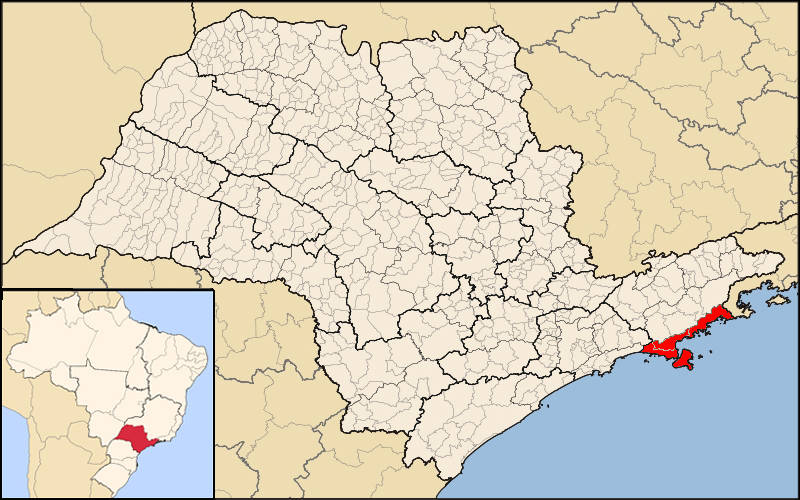

Website
- www.diocesecaraguatatuba.com.br

The Roman Catholic Diocese of Caraguatatuba (Latin: Dioecesis Caraguatatubensis) is a diocese located in the city of Caraguatatuba in Brazil.

== History ==
- 3 March 1999: Established as Diocese of Caraguatatuba from the Diocese of Santos

== Leadership ==
- Bishops of Caraguatatuba (Latin Church)
  - Fernando Mason, O.F.M. Conv. (1999.03.03 – 2005.05.25) appointed, Bishop of Piracicaba
  - Antônio Carlos Altieri, S.D.B. (2006.07.26 – 2012.07.11) appointed, Archbishop of Passo Fundo
  - José Carlos Chacorowski (2013.06.13 – Incumbent)
