= Irenaeus (given name) =

Saint Irenaeus of Lugdunum (Lyons) was a Catholic bishop, theologian and early church father.

Irenaeus or similar may also refer to:

- Irenaeus (grammarian), first-century Greek grammarian from Alexandria
- Irenaeus (died 258), Christian martyr in ancient Rome
- Irenaeus of Sirmium (died 304), bishop and martyr
- Irenaeus Bekish (1892 – 1981), primate of the Orthodox Church in America
- Irenäus Eibl-Eibesfeldt (1928 – 2018), Austrian ethnologist
- Irenaios of Jerusalem (Irenaios Skopelitis) (1939 – 2023), patriarch of the Eastern Orthodox Patriarchate of Jerusalem
- Irenaeus Susemihl (1919 – 1999), metropolitan bishop of Vienna and Austria of the Russian Orthodox Church and Soviet spy

== See also ==
- Irinej, the Slavic form of Irenaeus
- Irineu, the Portuguese form of Irenaeus
- Irénée, the French form of Irenaeus
- Irene (given name)
