= Irineu Gassen =

Brazilian Roman Catholic bishop (born 1942)

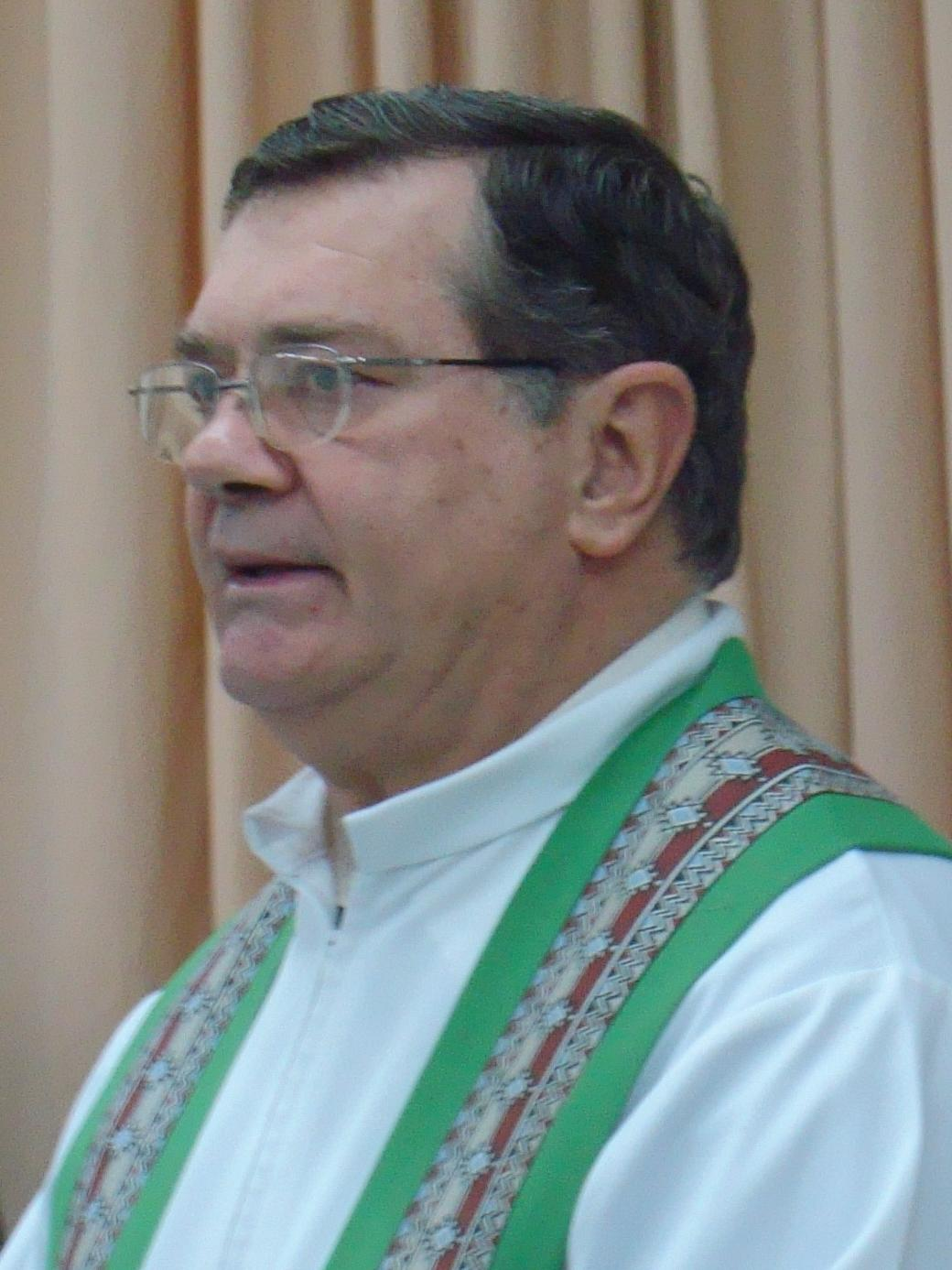
Irineu Gassen in July 2010

Irineu Gassen (born 24 November 1942 in Santa Cruz do Sul) is a Brazilian Roman Catholic bishop.

Ordained to the priesthood on 27 July 1968, Gassen was named bishop of the Roman Catholic Diocese of Vacaria on 28 May 2008.
