= Ruy Barbosa, Bahia =

- Municipality
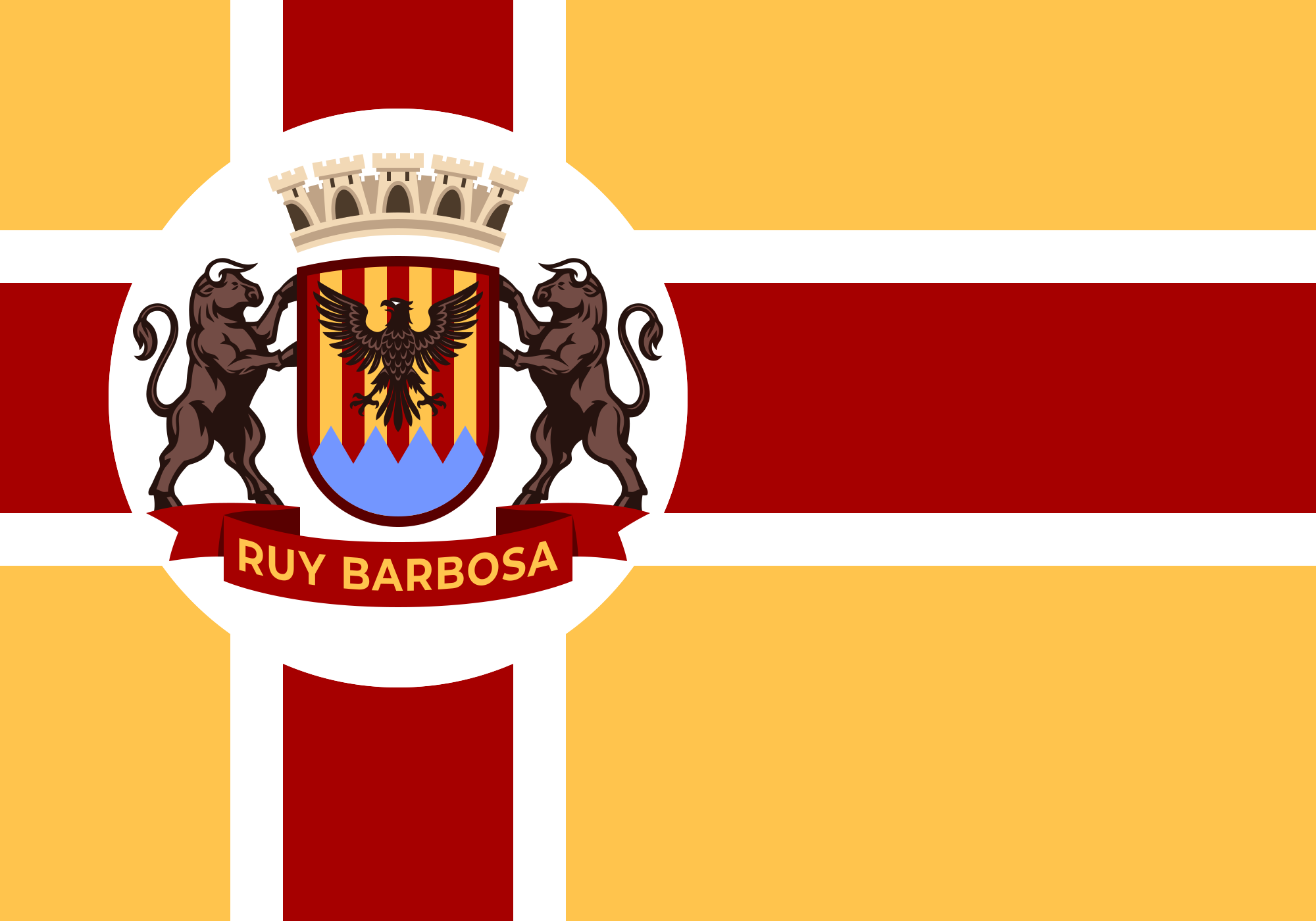
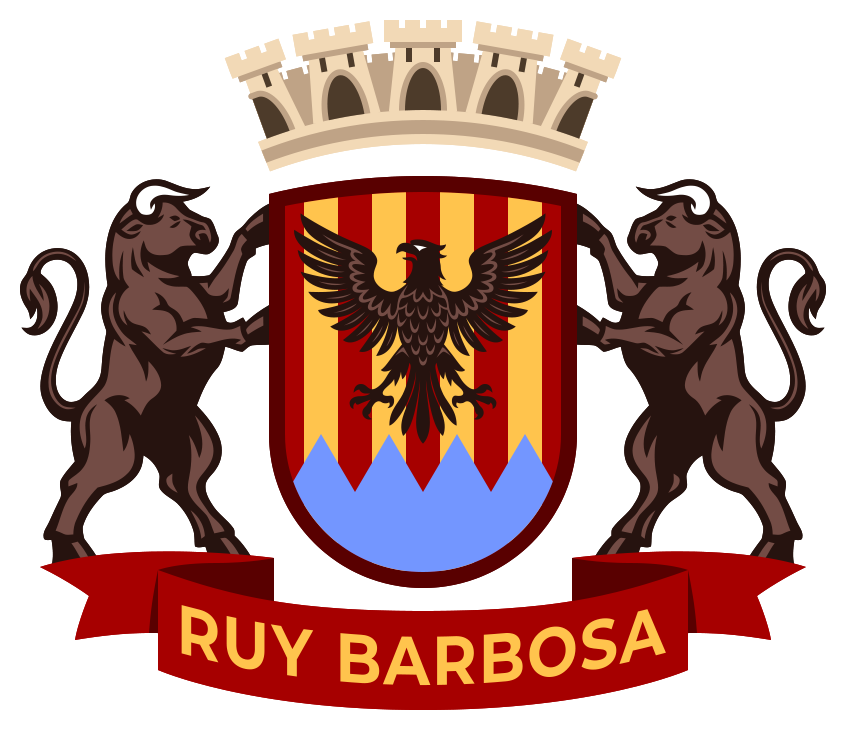
- Flag Coat of arms

- Ruy Barbosa in Bahia
- Coordinates: 12°17′02″S 40°29′38″W
- Country: Brazil
- Region: Nordeste
- State: Bahia

Area
  - Total: 821.987 sq mi (2,128.936 km^{2})
- Elevation: 1,207 ft (368 m)

Population (2020)
  - Total: 30,857
- Time zone: UTC−3 (BRT)

Ruy Barbosa, Bahia is a municipality in the state of Bahia in the North-East region of Brazil. Ruy Barbosa had a population of 30,857 as of 2020.

== See also ==
- List of municipalities in Bahia
