= Archdiocese of Feira de Santana =

Catholic ecclesiastical territory

Coordinates: 12.2594°S 38.9684°W

Archdiocese of Feira de Santana Archidioecesis Fori Sancti Annae Arquidiocese de Feira de Santana
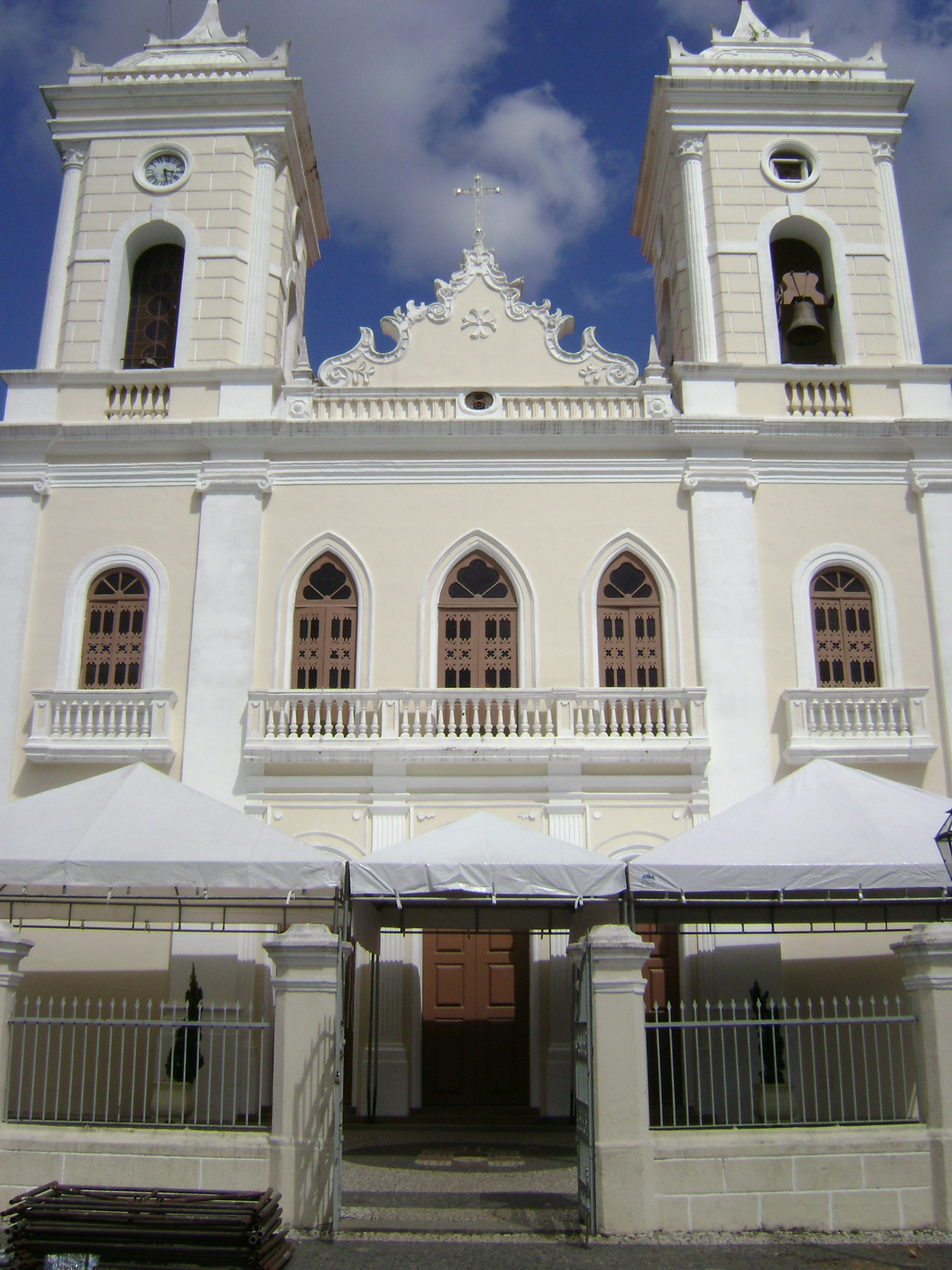
- Metropolitan Cathedral of St. Ann

- Coat of arms

Location
- Country: Brazil
- Ecclesiastical province: Feira de Santana

Statistics
- Area: 16,878 km^{2} (6,517 sq mi)
- Population: Total; Catholics: (as of 2006); 960,033; 859,949 (89.6%)

Information
- Rite: Latin Rite
- Established: 21 July 1962 (63 years ago)
- Cathedral: Cathedral of St Anne in Feira de Santana

Current leadership
- Pope: Leo XIV
- Metropolitan Archbishop: Zanoni Demettino Castro

Website
- www.arquidiocese-fsa.org.br

The Roman Catholic Archdiocese of Feira de Santana (Latin: Archidioecesis Fori Sancti Annae) is an archdiocese located in the city of Feira de Santana in Brazil.

== History ==
- July 21, 1962: Established as Diocese of Feira de Santana from the Metropolitan Archdiocese of São Salvador da Bahia
- January 16, 2002: Promoted as Metropolitan Archdiocese of Feira de Santana

== Bishops ==
=== Ordinaries, in reverse chronological order ===
- Archbishops of Feira de Santana (Roman rite)
  - Archbishop Zanoni Demettino Castro (2015.11.18-Present)
  - Archbishop Itamar Navildo Vian, OFMCap (2002.01.16 – 2015.11.18)
- Bishops of Feira de Santana (Roman Rite)
  - Bishop Itamar Navildo Vian, OFMCap (later Archbishop) (1995.02.22 – 2002.01.16)
  - Bishop Silvério Paulo de Albuquerque, OFM (1973.01.18 – 1995.02.22)
  - Bishop Jackson Berenguer Prado (1962.09.24 – 1971.10.08), appointed Bishop of Feira de Santana, Bahia

=== Coadjutor archbishop ===
- Zanoni Demettino Castro (2014-2015)

== Suffragan dioceses ==
- Diocese of Barra
- Diocese of Barreiras
- Diocese of Bonfim
- Diocese of Irecê
- Diocese of Juazeiro
- Diocese of Paulo Afonso
- Diocese of Ruy Barbosa
- Diocese of Serrinha

== Sources ==
- GCatholic.org
- Catholic Hierarchy
- Archdiocese website (Portuguese)
