= Diocese of Bonfim =

Catholic ecclesiastical territory

Coordinates: 10.4621°S 40.1900°W

Diocese of Bonfim Dioecesis Bonfimensis Diocese de Bonfim
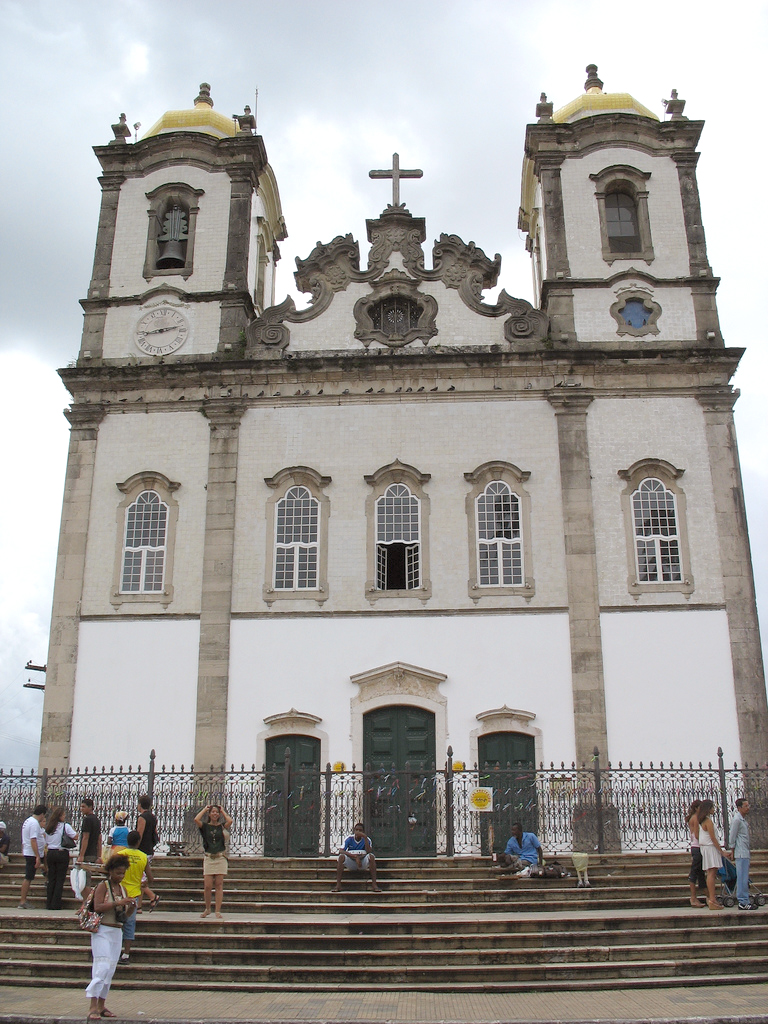

Location
- Country: Brazil
- Ecclesiastical province: Feira de Santana
- Metropolitan: Feira de Santana

Statistics
- Area: 34,600 km^{2} (13,400 sq mi)
- Population: Total; Catholics: (as of 2012); 659,000; 596,000 (90.4%)
- Parishes: 24

Information
- Rite: Latin Rite
- Established: 6 April 1933 (92 years ago)

Current leadership
- Pope: Leo XIV
- Bishop: Hernaldo Pinto Farias, S.S.S.
- Metropolitan Archbishop: Zanoni Demettino Castro

The Roman Catholic Diocese of Bonfim (Latin: Dioecesis Bonfimensis) is a diocese in the ecclesiastical province of Feira de Santana in northeastern Brazil.

Its episcopal cathedral is Catedral Senhor do Bonfim, dedicated to Our Lord, in the city of Salvador, Bahia state.

== History ==
- April 6, 1933: Established as Diocese of Bonfim, on territory split off from the Metropolitan Archdiocese of São Salvador da Bahia
- It lost territory thrice : on 1959.11.14 to establish the Diocese of Ruy Barbosa, on 1962.07.22 to establish the Diocese of Juazeiro and on 1971.09.14 to establish the Diocese of Paulo Afonso.

== Statistics ==
As per 2015, it pastorally served 525,000 Catholics (80.1% of 655,197 total) on 33,747 km² in 25 parishes with 42 priests (22 diocesan, 20 religious), 68 lay religious (21 brothers, 47 sisters) and 15 seminarians .

== Episcopal ordinaries ==
(all Latin Rite natives)

Suffragan Bishops of Bonfim

- Hugo Bressane de Araújo (1935.12.19 – 1940.09.19), next Bishop of Guaxupé (Brazil) (1940.09.19 – 1951.09.03), Titular Archbishop of Cotrada (1951.09.03 – 1954.10.07) as Coadjutor Archbishop of Belo Horizonte (Brazil) (1951.09.03 – 1954.10.07), finally Archbishop-Bishop of Diocese of Marilia (Brazil) (1954.10.07 – retired 1975.04.23), died 1988
- Henrique Hector Golland Trindade, Order of Friars Minor (O.F.M.) (1941.03.29 – 1948.05.15); next last suffragan Bishop of Botucatu (Brazil) (1948.05.15 – 1958.04.19), (see) promoted first Metropolitan Archbishop of Botucatu (1958.04.19 – 1968.03.27), retired as Titular Archbishop of Lilibeo (1968.03.27 – 1971.03.16), died 1974
- José Alves de Sà Trindade (1948.09.04 – 1956.05.27), next Bishop of Montes Claros (Brazil) (1956.05.27 – retired 1988.06.01), died 2005
- Antônio de Mendonça Monteiro (1957.03.07 – death 1972.12.23), previously Titular Bishop of Sozusa in Palæstina (1950.01.31 – 1957.03.07) as Auxiliary Bishop of São Salvador da Bahia (Brazil) (1950.01.31 – 1957.03.07)
- Jairo Rui Matos da Silva (1974.01.11 – retired 2006.07.26), died 2007
- Francisco Canindé Palhano (2006.07.26 – 2018.01.03), next Bishop of Petrolina (Brazil) (2018.01.03 – ...)
- Hernaldo Pinto Farias, S.S.S. (2019.09.15 - ... )

== Sources and References ==
- GCatholic.org, data for all sections
- Catholic Hierarchy
- Diocesan official website (Portuguese)
