= Irineu =

Irineu is the Portuguese version of the male given name Irenaeus.

Notable people with the name include:

- Irineu Esteve Altimiras (born 1996), Andorran cross-country skier
- Irineu Calixto Couto (born 1983), Brazilian footballer
- Irineu Gassen (born 1942), Brazilian bishop
- Raimundo Irineu Serra (1892 – 1971), Brazilian founder of the Santo Daime religion
- Irineu Evangelista de Sousa (1813 – 1889), Brazilian businessman and politician
- Victor Irineu de Souza (born 1989), Brazilian footballer
- Irineu Sílvio Wilges (1936 – 2022), Brazilian bishop
