= Diocese of Vacaria =

Latin Catholic jurisdiction in Brazil

Diocese of Vacaria Dioecesis Vaccariensis

Catholic
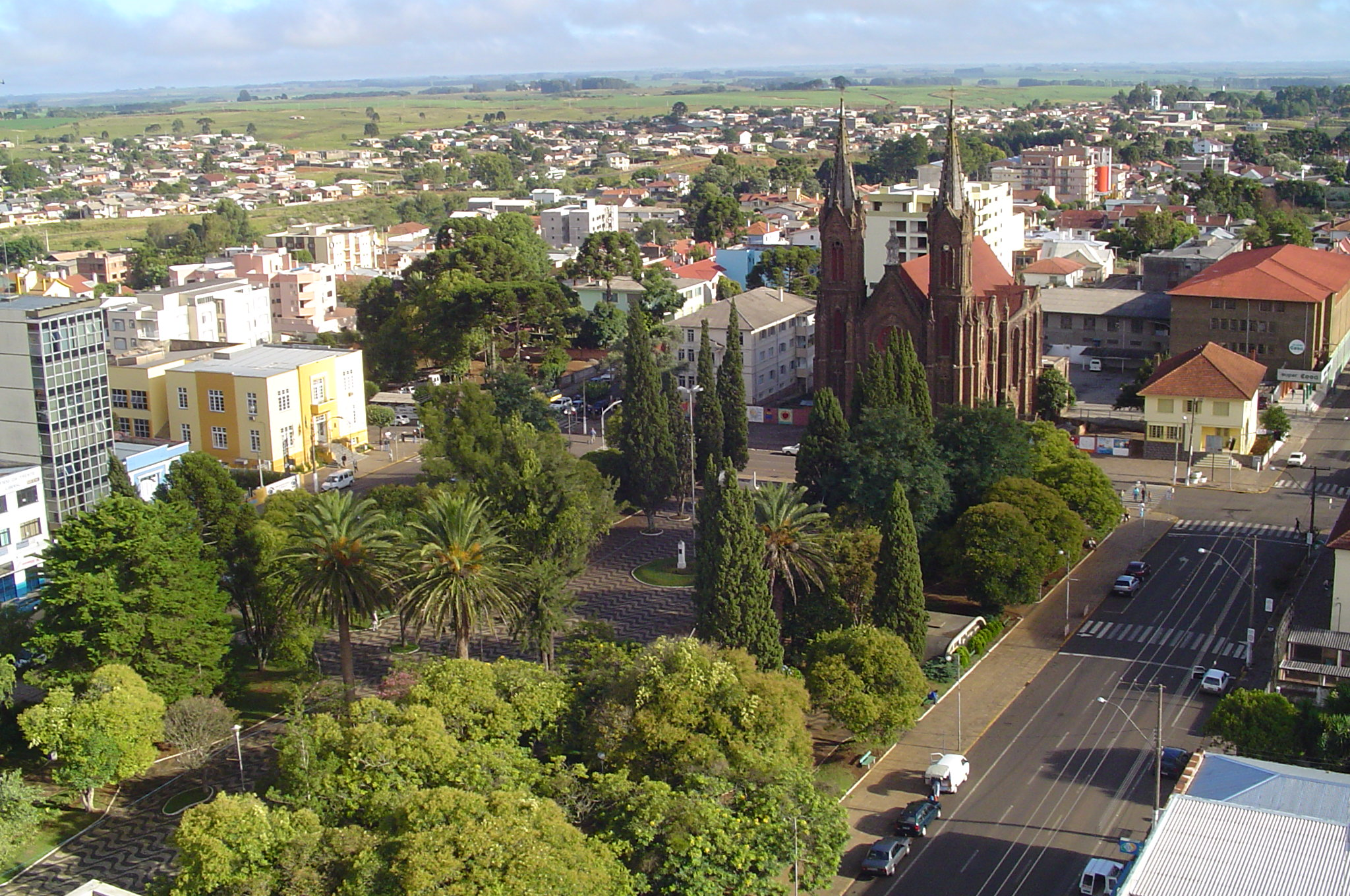
- Cathedral of Our Lady

Location
- Country: Brazil
- Ecclesiastical province: Passo Fundo

Statistics
- Area: 15,932 km^{2} (6,151 sq mi)
- Population: Total; Catholics: (as of 2004); 199,500; 181,300 (90.9%)

Information
- Denomination: Catholic Church
- Sui iuris church: Latin Church
- Rite: Roman Rite
- Established: 8 September 1934 (92 years ago)
- Cathedral: Catedral Nossa Senhora da Oliveira

Current leadership
- Pope: Leo XIV
- Bishop: Silvio Guterres Dutra
- Metropolitan Archbishop: Rodolfo Luís Weber
- Bishops emeritus: Orlando Octacílio Dotti, OFMCap; Irineu Gassen, OFM

The Diocese of Vacaria (Latin: Dioecesis Vaccariensis) is a Latin Church ecclesiastical jurisdiction or diocese of the Catholic Church in Brazil. Its episcopal see is Vacaria. The diocese is a suffragan diocese in the ecclesiastical province of the metropolitan Archdiocese of Passo Fundo.

== History ==
- 8 September 1934: Established as Territorial Prelature of Vacaria from the Metropolitan Archdiocese of Porto Alegre
- 18 January 1957: Promoted as Diocese of Vacaria

== Bishops ==
=== Ordinaries, in reverse chronological order ===
- Bishops of Vacaria
  - Bishop Silvio Guterres Dutra (2018.05.09 - present)
  - Bishop Irineu Gassen, OFM (2008.05.28 – 2018.05.09)
  - Bishop Pedro Sbalchiero Neto, M.S. (2003.11.12 – 2007.07.03)
  - Bishop Orlando Octacílio Dotti, OFMCap (1986.02.05 – 2003.11.12)
  - Bishop Henrique Gelain (1964.03.28 – 1986.02.05)
  - Bishop Augusto Petró (1958.05.16 – 1964.03.12), appointed Bishop of Uruguaiana, Rio Grande do Sul
- Prelate of Vacaria
  - Bishop Cândido Julio Bampi, OFMCap (1936.06.27 – 1957.01.18), appointed Auxiliary bishop of Caxias do Sul, Rio Grande do Sul

=== Coadjutor bishops ===
- Orlando Octacílio Dotti, OFMCap (1983-1986)
- Pedro Sbalchiero Neto, M.S. (2003)
