= Irinej =

Name list

Irinej is the Slavic form of the name Irenaeus.

People bearing this name include:

- Irinej, Serbian Patriarch (1930–2020), the 45th Patriarch of the Serbian Orthodox Church (2010–2020).
- Irinej Bulović (born 1947), a Serbian Eastern Orthodox cleric who served as Bishop of Bačka
- Irinej Dobrijević (born 1955), a Serbian Eastern Orthodox cleric who served as Bishop of the Metropolitanate of Australia and New Zealand
