= Diocese of Paulo Afonso =

Catholic ecclesiastical territory

Diocese of Paulo Afonso Dioecesis Paulalfonsanensis Diocese de Paulo Afonso
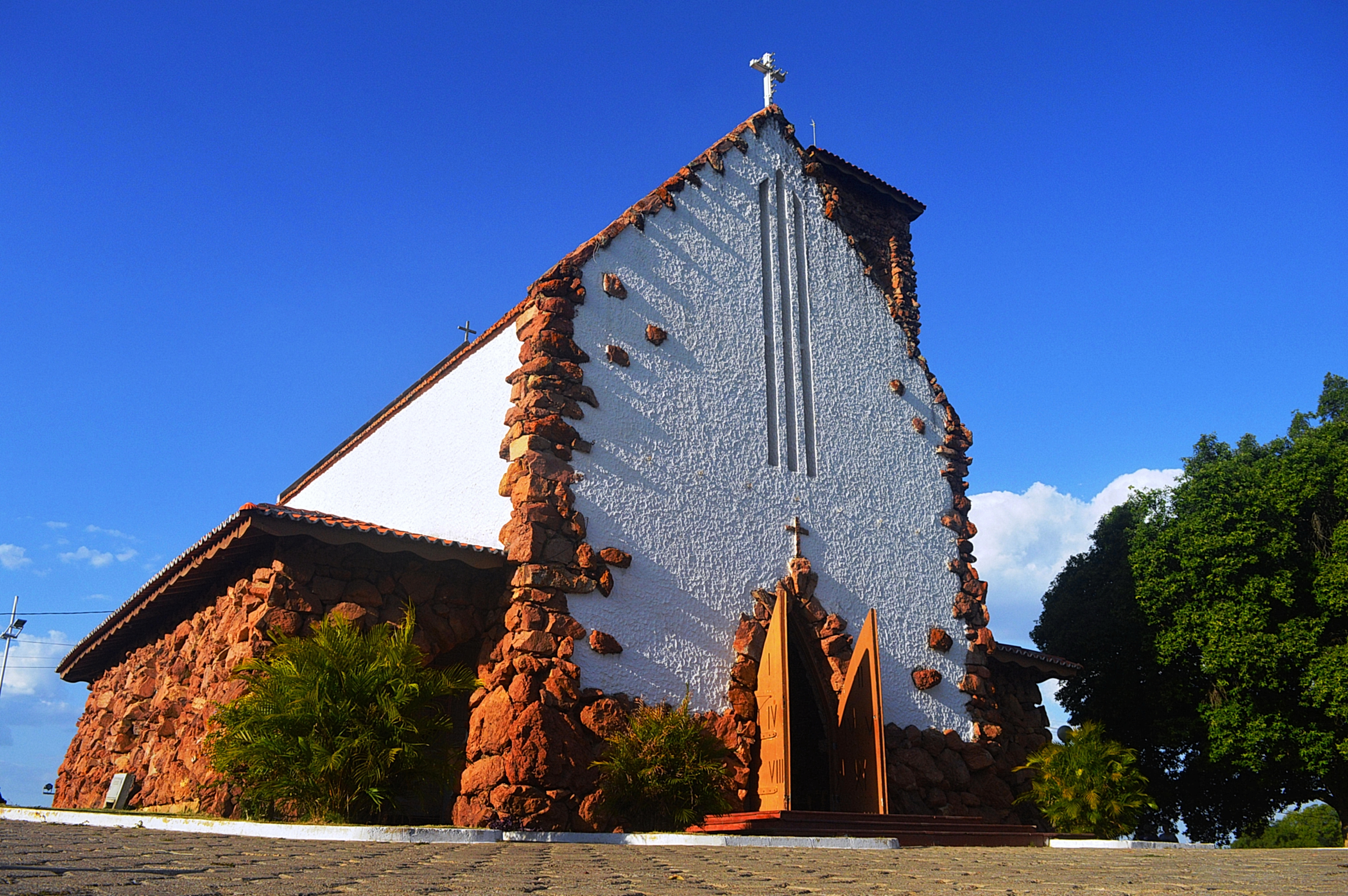

Location
- Country: Brazil
- Ecclesiastical province: Feira de Santana
- Metropolitan: Feira de Santana

Statistics
- Area: 36,913 km^{2} (14,252 sq mi)
- Population: Total; Catholics: (as of 2004); 601,215; 488,698 (81.3%)

Information
- Rite: Latin Rite
- Established: 14 September 1971 (54 years ago)
- Cathedral: Cathedral of Our Lady of Fatima in Paulo Afonso

Current leadership
- Pope: Leo XIV
- Bishop: Guido Zendron
- Metropolitan Archbishop: Zanoni Demettino Castro

The Roman Catholic Diocese of Paulo Afonso (Latin: Dioecesis Paulalfonsanensis) is a diocese located in the city of Paulo Afonso in the ecclesiastical province of Feira de Santana in Brazil.

== History ==
- September 14, 1971: Established as Diocese of Paulo Afonso from the Diocese of Bonfim

== Leadership ==
- Bishops of Paulo Afonso (Roman rite)
  - Bishop Jackson Berenguer Prado (1971.10.08 – 1983.08.17)
  - Bishop Aloysio José Leal Penna, S.J. (1984.05.21 – 1987.10.30), appointed Coadjutor Bishop of Bauru, São Paulo; future Archbishop
  - Bishop Mário Zanetta (1988.06.15 – 1998.11.13)
  - Bishop Esmeraldo Barreto de Farias, Ist. del Prado (2000.03.22 – 2007.02.28), appointed Bishop of Santarém, Para
  - Bishop Guido Zendron (2008.03.12 – present)
