= Diocese of Barra =

Catholic ecclesiastical territory

Coordinates: 11.0913°S 43.1394°W

Diocese of Barra Dioecesis Barrensis Diocese de Barra
- Cathedral of St Francis of Assisi in Barra in 2020

Location
- Country: Brazil
- Ecclesiastical province: Feira de Santana
- Metropolitan: Feira de Santana

Statistics
- Area: 44,987 km^{2} (17,370 sq mi)
- Population: Total; Catholics: (as of 2012); 280,000; 252,000 (90%)

Information
- Rite: Latin Rite
- Established: 20 October 1913 (113 years ago)
- Cathedral: Cathedral of St Francis of Assisi in Barra

Current leadership
- Pope: Leo XIV
- Bishop elect: João Batista Alves do Nascimento
- Metropolitan Archbishop: Zanoni Demettino Castro
- Bishops emeritus: Luís Flávio Cappio

The Roman Catholic Diocese of Barra (Latin: Dioecesis Barrensis) is a diocese located in the city of Barra in the ecclesiastical province of Feira de Santana in Brazil.

== History ==
- October 20, 1913: Established as Diocese of Barra from the Metropolitan Archdiocese of São Salvador da Bahia

== Leadership ==
Bishops of Barra

- Augusto Álvaro da Silva (1915.06.25 – 1924.12.17), appointed Archbishop of São Salvador da Bahia
- Antônio Bezerra de Menezes (1925), did not take effect
- Adalberto Accioli Sobral (1927.04.22 – 1934.01.13), appointed Bishop of Pesqueira, Pernambuco
- Rodolfo das Mercés de Oliveira Pena (1935.06.08 – 1942.01.03), appointed Bishop of Valença, Rio de Janeiro
- João Batista Muniz, CSsR (1942.08.24 – 1966.12.09)
- Tiago Gerardo Cloin, CSsR. (1966.12.09 – 1975.10.24)
- Orlando Octacílio Dotti, OFMCap (1976.04.01 – 1983.05.30), appointed Coadjutor Bishop of Vacaria, Rio Grande do Sul
- Itamar Navildo Vian, OFMCap (1983.12.29 – 1995.02.22), appointed Bishop of Feira de Santana, Bahia
- Luís Flávio Cappio, OFM (1997.04.16 – 31 May 2023)
- João Batista Alves do Nascimento (31 May 2023
