= Diocese of União da Vitória =

Latin Catholic jurisdiction in Brazil

Diocese of União da Vitória Dioecesis Unionensis a Victoria Diocese de União da Vitória
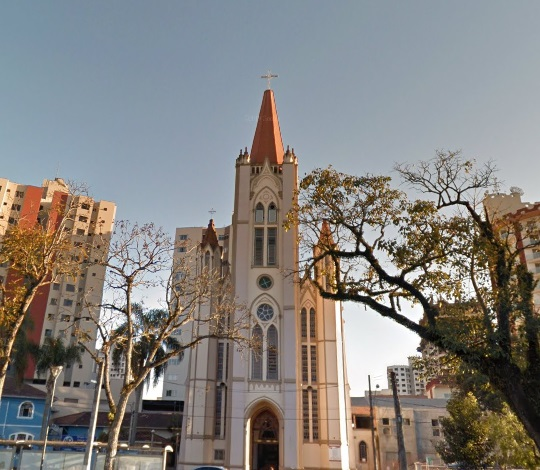
- Cathedral of the Sacred Heart of Jesus in União da Vitória in 2020

Location
- Country: Brazil
- Ecclesiastical province: Curitiba

Statistics
- Area: 10,000 km^{2} (3,900 sq mi)
- Population: Total; Catholics: (as of 2023); 238,597; 185,417 (77.7%)
- Parishes: 25

Information
- Denomination: Catholic Church
- Sui iuris church: Latin Church
- Rite: Roman Rite
- Established: 3 December 1976; 49 years ago
- Cathedral: Cathedral of the Sacred Heart of Jesus in União da Vitória
- Secular priests: 38 (31 Diocesan, 7 Religious Orders)

Current leadership
- Pope: Leo XIV
- Bishop: Sede Vacante
- Metropolitan Archbishop: José Antônio Peruzzo

Website
- Website of the Diocese

The Diocese of União da Vitória (Latin: Dioecesis Unionensis a Victoria) is a Latin Church ecclesiastical jurisdiction or diocese of the Catholic Church in Brazil. Its episcopal see is União da Vitória. The diocese is a suffragan diocese in the ecclesiastical province of the metropolitan Archdicoese Curitiba.

== History ==
- 3 December 1976: Established as Diocese of União da Vitória from the Metropolitan Archdiocese of Curitiba, Diocese of Guarapuava and Diocese of Ponta Grossa

== Leadership ==
Bishops of União da Vitória

- Bishop Walter Jorge Pinto (2019.01.09 – 2025.11.07), appointed Bishop of Campanha, Minas Gerais
- Bishop Agenor Girardi, M.S.C. (2015.05.06 – 2018.02.08)
- Bishop João Bosco Barbosa de Sousa, O.F.M. (2007.01.03 – 2014.04.16), appointed Bishop of Osasco, São Paulo
- Bishop Walter Michael Ebejer, O.P. (1976.12.03 – 2007.01.03), retired
