= Albano Bortoletto Cavallin =

Brazilian Roman Catholic prelate (1930–2017)

- Archbishop of Londrina
- Church: Catholic Church
- Archdiocese: Archdiocese of Londrina
- In office: 11 March 1992 – 10 May 2006
- Predecessor: Geraldo Majella Agnelo
- Successor: Orlando Brandes
- Previous posts: Bishop of Guarapuava (1986-1992); Titular Bishop of Aquae Novae in Numidia (1973-1986); Auxiliary Bishop of Curitiba (1973-1986)

Orders
- Ordination: 6 December 1953 by Manuel da Silveira d'Elboux
- Consecration: 28 August 1973 by Pedro Antônio Marchetti Fedalto

Personal details
- Born: 25 April 1930 Lapa, Paraná, Brazil
- Died: 1 February 2017 (aged 86) Londrina, Paraná, Brazil

Albano Bortoletto Cavallin (25 April 1930 – 1 February 2017) was a Brazilian Roman Catholic prelate.

Born in Lapa, Paraná, Bortoletto Cavallin was ordained to the priesthood in 1953. He served as the Bishop of Guarapuava from 1986 to 1992, and later served as the Archbishop of Londrina from 1992 until his retirement in 2006. He died from surgical complications on 1 February 2017 in Londrina at the age of 86.

== See also ==
- Catholic Church in Brazil
