= Thomas Martin Fox =

Australian Catholic bishop (1893–1967

The Most Reverend Thomas Martin Fox
- Bishop of Diocese of Wilcannia–Forbes
- Diocese: Wilcannia–Forbes
- Installed: 20 September 1931
- Term ended: 10 July 1967
- Predecessor: William Hayden
- Successor: Douglas Joseph Warren

Orders
- Ordination: 2 June 1917 at Archbasilica of Saint John Lateran by Basilio Pompili
- Consecration: 9 June 1931 at Sacred Heart Cathedral, Broken Hill by Bartolomeo Cattaneo

Personal details
- Born: Thomas Martin Fox; 6 May 1893 Broken Hill, New South Wales, Australia
- Died: 10 July 1967 (aged 74) Broken Hill, New South Wales, Australia
- Denomination: Catholic Church
- Occupation: Catholic bishop
- Education: Pontificio Collegio Urbano de Propaganda Fide

Thomas Martin Fox (6 May 1893 – 10 July 1967) was an Australian bishop of the Catholic Church. He served for 36 years as Bishop of Wilcannia–Forbes. He was the first Bishop of Wilcannia–Forbes to be born in and ordained for the diocese.

== Early life ==
Fox was born in Broken Hill to Martin and Mary Fox. He was educated by the Sisters of Mercy in Broken Hill before entering Sacred Heart College, Adelaide to receive his secondary education from the Marist Brothers. His father was from County Carlow, Ireland and passed away prior to Fox's ordination.

At the time of his episcopal consecration, he was the only surviving of seven children, the other six dying during childhood. He came from a highly religious family. Three of his aunts were Sisters of St Joseph and one of his cousins was a monsignor.

He began his priestly formation at St Columba's College, Springwood before moving to St Patrick's Seminary, Manly. In 1914, he was then sent to Rome to study at the Pontificio Collegio Urbano de Propaganda Fide.

== Priesthood ==
On 2 June 1917, he was ordained as a priest for the Diocese of Wilcannia–Forbes in the Archbasilica of Saint John Lateran by Cardinal Basilio Pompili.

He returned to his native diocese at the end of 1917. He served as assistant priest in Sacred Heart Cathedral, Broken Hill for four years before moving to Nyngan. He briefly served in Forbes before being appointed parish priest of Wentworth. He then was appointed as administrator of Forbes.

== Episcopate ==
On 9 June 1931, he was appointed third Bishop of Wilcannia–Forbes by Pope Pius XI. At the time, he was the youngest bishop in the Australasian hierarchy and just the seventh Australian to hold episcopal office.

During his more than three decades at the helm of the diocese, he made great efforts to promote vocations to priesthood and religious life. More than 40 men were ordained for the Diocese of Wilcannia–Forbes during his tenure despite only having about 20,000 Catholics. He helped religious orders establish a greater presence in the diocese and helped to establish Red Bend Catholic College in Forbes, run by the Marist Brothers.

Fox had also hoped to have a contemplative order join the diocese and his dream was realised in 1948 with the establishment of the Carmelite Nuns at Parkes. Nine nuns came from Tourcoing, France to establish the new convent in Parkes.

In 1964, Bishop Douglas Joseph Warren was appointed and ordained auxiliary bishop of Wilcannia–Forbes to support the aging Fox. Reports at the time noted Fox had been worn down by three decades of long journeys and constant hard labouring across the vast diocese.

== Death ==
On 10 July 1967, Fox died in Broken Hill at the age of 74. He had been confined to a bed for a few years prior to his death. He was buried in Sacred Heart Cathedral, Broken Hill.

Catholic Church titles
Preceded by William Hayden	Bishop of Wilcannia–Forbes; 1931–1967	Succeeded by Douglas Joseph Warren
