= Aquae Novae in Numidia =

Aquae Novae in Numidia is a former Roman city and bishopric and presently a Latin Catholic titular see.

== History ==
Aquae Novae was an ancient city in present Algeria, which was important enough to become a suffragan bishopric in the Roman province of Numidia, but faded.

== Titular see ==
The diocese was nominally restored in 1933 as a titular bishopric.

It has had the following incumbents, all of the lowest (episcopal) rank :

- Douglas Joseph Warren (1964.06.16 – 1967.09.26), as Auxiliary Bishop of Wilcannia–Forbes (Australia) (1964.06.16 – 1967.09.26), later succeeded as Bishop of Wilcannia-Forbes (1967.09.26 – 1994.03.30)
- Samuel Silverio Buitrago Trujillo, Lazarists (C.M.) (1968.10.11 – 1972.12.18), Auxiliary Bishop of Manizales (Colombia) (1968.10.11 – 1972.12.18), later Bishop of Montería (Colombia) (1972.12.18 – 1976.10.11), finally Metropolitan Archbishop of Popayán (Colombia) (1976.10.11 – 1990.04.11)
- Tito Solari Capellari, Salesians (S.D.B.) (1986.12.16 – 1998.03.07), Auxiliary Bishop of Santa Cruz de la Sierra (Bolivia) (1986.12.16 – 1998.03.07), Coadjutor Archbishop of Cochabamba (Bolivia) (1998.03.07 – 1999.07.08), succeeding as Metropolitan Archbishop of Cochabamba (1999.07.08 – 2014.09.24)
- Albano Bortoletto Cavallin (1973.06.14 – 1986.10.24), Auxiliary Bishop of Curitiba (Brazil) (1973.06.14 – 1986.10.24), Bishop of Guarapuava (Brazil) (1986.10.24 – 1992.03.11), Metropolitan Archbishop of Londrina (Brazil) (1992.03.11 – 2006.05.10)
- Francisco Javier Múnera Correa, Consolata Missionaries (I.M.C.) (1998.11.28 – ...), Apostolic Vicar of San Vicente del Caguán (Colombia).

== See also ==
- Aquae in Numidia
- Aquae Novae in Proconsulari

== Source and External links ==
- GigaCatholic with titular incumbent links
