= Agenor Girardi =

Brazilian Roman Catholic bishop (1952–2018)

Agenor Girardi M.S.C.
- Bishop of União da Vitória
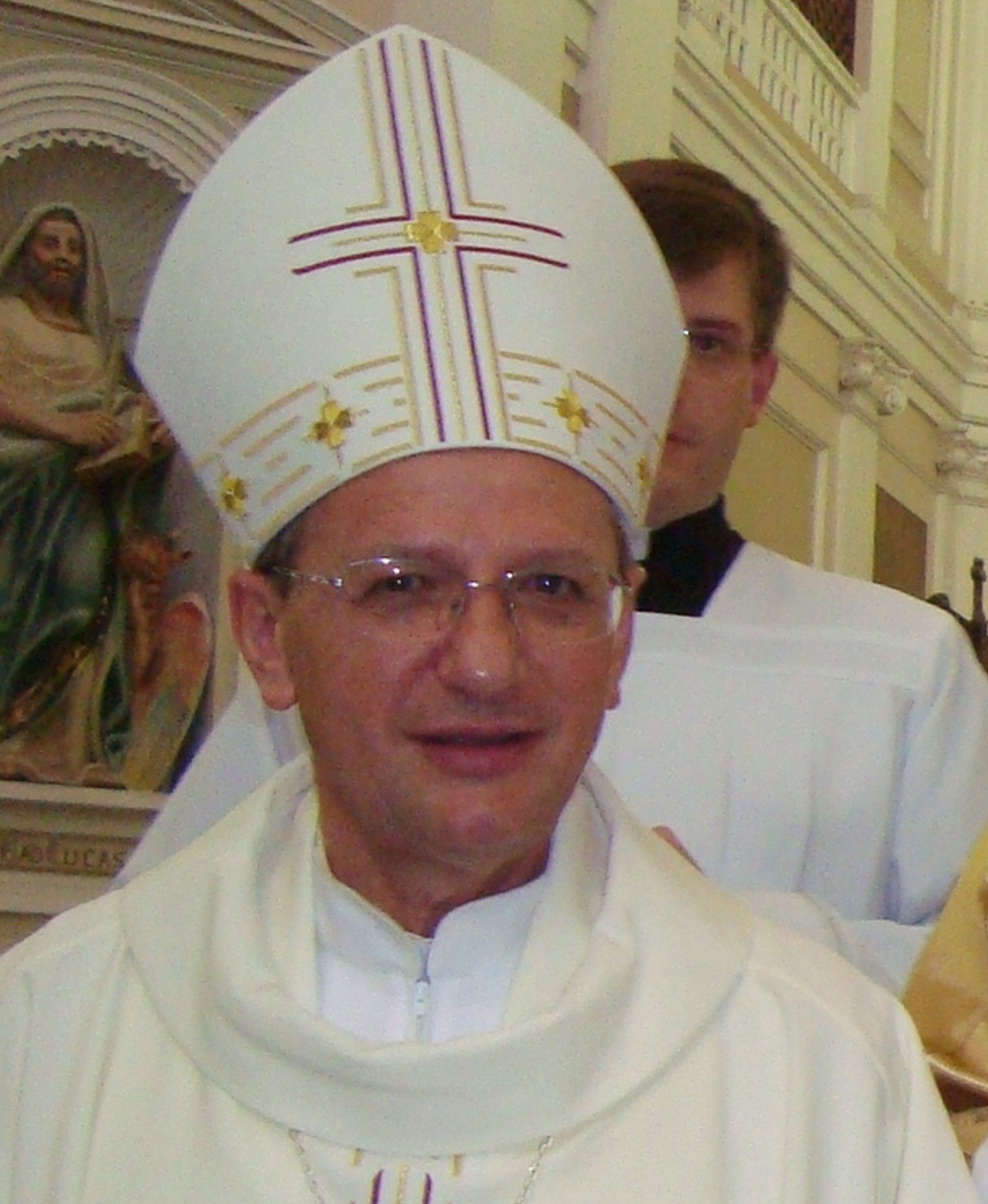
- Church: Catholic Church
- Diocese: Diocese of União da Vitória
- In office: 6 May 2015 – 8 February 2018
- Predecessor: João Bosco Barbosa de Sousa
- Successor: Walter Jorge Pinto
- Previous posts: Titular Bishop of Furnos Maior (2010-2015); Auxiliary Bishop of Porto Alegre (2010-2015)

Orders
- Ordination: 5 September 1982 by Agostinho José Sartori
- Consecration: 25 March 2011 by José Antônio Peruzzo

Personal details
- Born: 2 February 1952 Orleans, Santa Catarina, United States of Brazil
- Died: 8 February 2018 (aged 66) Porto União, Santa Catarina, Brazil

Agenor Girardi, M.S.C. (2 February 1952 – 8 February 2018) was a Roman Catholic bishop.

Girardi was ordained to the priesthood in 1982 in the Missionaries of the Sacred Heart. He served as auxiliary bishop of the Roman Catholic Archdiocese of Porto Alegre, Brazil from 2011 to 2015. He then served as bishop of the Roman Catholic Diocese of União da Vitória, Brazil from 2015 until his death.
