= Douglas Warren (bishop) =

The Most Reverend Douglas Joseph Warren
- Bishop of Diocese of Wilcannia–Forbes
- Diocese: Wilcannia–Forbes
- Installed: 26 September 1967
- Term ended: 30 March 1994
- Predecessor: Thomas Martin Fox
- Successor: Barry Francis Collins
- Other posts: Auxiliary Bishop of Wilcannia–Forbes (1964–1967); Titular Bishop of Aquae Novae in Numidia (1964–1967)

Orders
- Ordination: 20 December 1942 at Rome by Pietro Fumasoni Biondi
- Consecration: 27 July 1964 at Cathedral of St Michael and St John, Bathurst by Norman Thomas Gilroy

Personal details
- Born: Douglas Joseph Warren; 21 March 1919 Canowindra, New South Wales, Australia
- Died: 6 February 2013 (aged 93) Parkes, New South Wales, Australia
- Denomination: Catholic Church
- Occupation: Catholic bishop
- Education: St Columba's College, Sringwood; Pontificio Collegio Urbano de Propaganda Fide
- Motto: Cor Docile ("An Obedient Heart")

Douglas Joseph Warren (21 March 1919 – 6 February 2013) was an Australian bishop of the Roman Catholic Church.

== Early life ==
Warren was born in Canowindra, New South Wales, one of five children to Alfred, a draper, and Sara Warren. He attended St Joseph's Convent School, Canowindra and St Edward's Catholic School, Canowindra. In 1936, he was accepted as a student at St Columba's College, Springwood to begin studies for the priesthood. He continued his studies at the Pontificio Collegio Urbano de Propaganda Fide. His mother passed away in 1941, while he was studying for the priesthood in Rome.

== Priesthood ==
Warren was ordained a priest on 20 December 1942 for the Diocese of Wilcannia-Forbes in Rome by Cardinal Pietro Fumasoni Biondi. Following his ordination, he remained in Rome for further studies. He was forced to flee the city in 1943 following the German occupation of Rome. He went first to Lisbon, Portugal before going to England where they ministered while awaiting a secure passage back to Australia. He finally returned to Australia in March 1944, returning through the Panama Canal.

His first appointment was as curate at Parkes. In 1947, he was appointed secretary to Bishop Thomas Martin Fox and Chancellor of the Diocese of Wilcannia–Forbes. In 1956, he was appointed administrator of Forbes.

== Episcopacy ==
On 16 June 1964, he was appointed Auxiliary Bishop of Wilcannia–Forbes and Titular Bishop of Aquae Novae in Numidia by Pope Paul VI. He was consecrated by Cardinal Sir Norman Thomas Gilroy on 27 July 1964 at Sacred Heart Cathedral, Broken Hill.

While working as Auxiliary Bishop, Warren travelled to Brewarrina, a small town of a few hundred people, to bless the new rectory. The town had been suffering an 18-month drought when he arrived, which had caused the loss of thousands of sheep, the principal industry in the region. After the blessing, he offered up Mass in the local church for the intention of rain. While leaving, storm clouds gathered an the clouds burst down in a deluge, causing Warren to become stuck in thick mud, and forcing the group to be rescued. The story went viral and was reported in multiple newspapers in the United States.

Following the death of Bishop Thomas Martin Fox, he was appointed Bishop of Wilcannia–Forbes on 26 September 1967.

As bishop, he was known for riding a Matchless motorcycle between parishes due to the many unpaved roads across the vast and rural diocese which he shepherded.

He worked particularly hard in the area of education, under a new funding arrangement and reorganised central administration. He also supervised the growth in Catholic lay teachers in the region, to replace the declining numbers of members of religious orders working in education.

== Retirement and death ==
Warren retired as Bishop of Wilcannia–Forbes on 30 March 1994, after reaching the canonical retirement age of 75. He died on 6 February 2013, at the Southern Cross Village in Parkes, New South Wales. At the time of his death, he was the oldest Australian Roman Catholic bishop at the age of 93.
