= Ebejer =

Ebejer is a surname. Notable people with the surname include:

- Francis Ebejer (1925–1993), Maltese dramatist and novelist
- Walter Michael Ebejer (1929–2021), Maltese missionary, lecturer and a retired bishop of the Catholic Church
- Brian Charles Ebejer (born 1974), metal vocalist known by the alias Edsel Dope
