= Roman Catholic Diocese of São José dos Pinhais =

Latin Catholic diocese in Brazil

Diocese of São José dos Pinhais Dioecesis Sancti Iosephi Pinealensis Diocese de São José dos Pinhais
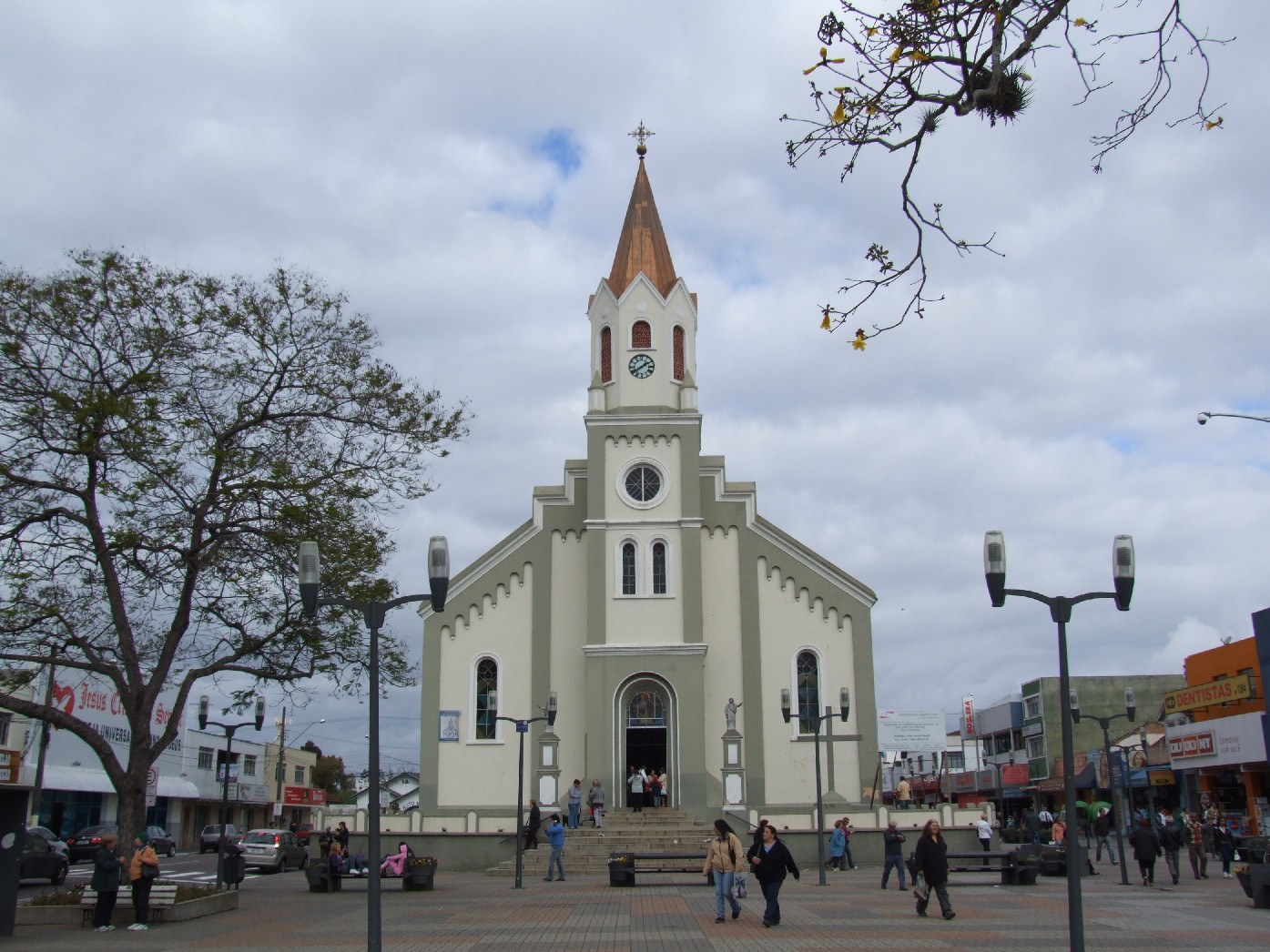
- Cathedral of St. Joseph

Location
- Country: Brazil
- Ecclesiastical province: Curitiba

Statistics
- Area: 7,172 km^{2} (2,769 sq mi)
- Population: Total; Catholics: (as of 2010); 725,000; 517,000 (71.3%)

Information
- Denomination: Catholic Church
- Sui iuris church: Latin Church
- Rite: Roman Rite
- Established: 6 December 2006 (19 years ago)
- Cathedral: Cathedral of St Joseph in São José dos Pinhais

Current leadership
- Pope: Leo XIV
- Bishop: Francisco Carlos Bach

Website
- www.diocesesjp.org.br

The Diocese of São José dos Pinhais (Latin: Dioecesis Sancti Iosephi Pinealensis) is a Latin Church ecclesiastical jurisdiction or diocese of the Catholic Church in Brazil. It is a suffragan in the ecclesiastical province of the metropolitan Archdiocese of Curitiba.

Its cathedral is Catedral de São José, dedicated to Saint Joseph, in the city of São José dos Pinhais in Paraná state.

== Statistics ==
As per 2015, it pastorally served 667,752 Catholics (79.9% of 835,575 total) on 7,186 km² in 38 parishes with 75 priests (34 diocesan, 41 religious), 45 deacons, 190 lay religious (85 brothers, 105 sisters) and 10 seminarians.

== History ==
- Established on 6 December 2006 as Diocese of São José dos Pinhais, on territory split off from the Archdiocese of Curitiba, which remains its Metropolitan.

== Bishops ==
- Ladislau Biernaski, Lazarists (C.M.) (6 December 2006 – death 13 February 2012), previously Titular Bishop of Tetci (1979.04.19 – 2006.12.06) and Auxiliary Bishop of Curitiba (1979.04.19 – 2006.12.06)
- Francisco Carlos Bach (3 October 2012 – 2017.04.19), also Apostolic Administrator of Roman Catholic Diocese of Paranaguá (2015.04.11 – 2015.11.25); previously Bishop of Toledo (Brazil) (2005.07.27 – 2012.10.03); next Bishop of Joinville (2017.04.19 – ...)
- Celso Antônio Marchiori (2017.12.13 – ...), previously Bishop of Apucarana) (2009.07.08 – 2017.12.13).

== Sources and external links ==
- GCatholic.org - data for all sections, with Google map
- Catholic Hierarchy
