= Eduardo Koaik =

Brazilian bishop (1926–2012)

Eduardo Miled Koaik
- Bishop of Piracicaba
- Church: Catholic Church
- Diocese: Diocese of Piracicaba
- In office: 11 January 1984 – 15 May 2002
- Predecessor: Aníger de Francisco de Maria Melillo
- Successor: Moacyr José Vitti
- Previous posts: Coadjutor Bishop of Piracicaba (1979-1984); Titular Bishop of Noba (1973-1979); Auxiliary Bishop of Rio de Janeiro (1973-1979)

Orders
- Ordination: 8 April 1950
- Consecration: 6 January 1974 by Eugênio Sales

Personal details
- Born: 21 August 1926 Manaus, Amazonas, Republic of the United States of Brazil
- Died: 25 August 2012 (aged 86)

Eduardo Koaik (21 August 1926 – 25 August 2012) was the Catholic bishop of the Diocese of Piracicaba, Brazil.

Ordained to the priesthood in 1950, Koaik was named bishop in 1973. He retired in 2002.
