= Alfred E. Novak =

American-born Brazilian Roman Catholic prelate

The Most Reverend Alfredo Ernest Novak, C.Ss.R., D.D.
- Bishop Emeritus of Paranaguá
- Church: Roman Catholic Church
- Province: Curitiba
- See: Paranaguá
- In office: March 15, 1989—August 2, 2006
- Predecessor: Bernard J. Nolker, C.Ss.R.
- Successor: João Alves dos Santos
- Previous posts: Titular Bishop of Vardimissa & Auxiliary Bishop of the Roman Catholic Archdiocese of São Paulo (1979-1989)

Orders
- Ordination: July 2, 1956
- Consecration: May 27, 1979 by Paulo Evaristo Arns, O.F.M.

Personal details
- Born: June 2, 1930 Dwight, Nebraska, United States
- Died: December 3, 2014 (aged 84)

Alfred Ernest Novak, C.Ss.R. (Portuguese: Alfredo Ernesto Novak)(June 2, 1930 – December 3, 2014) was an American member of the Congregation of the Most Holy Redeemer, commonly referred to as the Redemptorists, who worked as a missionary in Brazil. He served as the second Bishop of the Roman Catholic Diocese of Paranaguá from 1989-2006.

== Biography ==
Novak was born in Dwight, Nebraska. He was educated at the Redemptorist minor seminary, St. Joseph’s College, in Kirkwood, Missouri. He was admitted to the congregation at their novitiate in De Soto, Missouri, where he professed religious vows as a Redemptorist. He studied for the priesthood at Immaculate Conception Seminary in Oconomowoc, Wisconsin and was ordained there on July 2, 1956.

Novak was serving as a missionary in Brazil when, on April 19, 1979, Pope John Paul II named him Titular Bishop of Vardimissa and an Auxiliary Bishop of São Paulo. He was ordained a bishop by Cardinal Paulo Evaristo Arns, O.F.M., the Archbishop of São Paulo. The principal co-consecrators were Bishops José Ivo Lorscheiter of Santa Maria and Aloísio Ariovaldo Amaral, C.Ss.R., of Limeira. He served the archdiocese for ten years.

On March 15, 1989, Pop John Paul named Novak as the second Bishop of Paranaguá. He served the diocese as its bishop for 17 years before Pope Benedict XVI accepted his resignation on August 2, 2006, and he was granted the title of bishop emeritus.
