= Christopher Toohey =

Australian Catholic bishop born 1952

The Most Reverend Christopher Toohey
- Bishop Emeritus of Diocese of Wilcannia–Forbes
- Diocese: Wilcannia–Forbes
- Installed: 30 August 2001
- Term ended: 9 June 2009
- Predecessor: Barry Francis Collins
- Successor: Columba Macbeth-Green

Orders
- Ordination: 21 August 1982 at St Mary's Cathedral, Sydney by James Darcy Freeman
- Consecration: 30 August 2001 at Holy Family Church, Parkes by George Pell

Personal details
- Born: Christopher Henry Toohey; 19 April 1952 Balmain, New South Wales, Australia
- Denomination: Catholic Church
- Occupation: Catholic bishop

Christopher Henry Toohey, (born 19 April 1952) in an Australian bishop of the Catholic Church. He served for Bishop of Wilcannia–Forbes for eight years before resigning from active ministry in 2009 due to "hurtful behaviour" although he wasn't alleged to have been involved in any criminal behaviour.

== Early life ==
Toohey was born in Balmain and grew up on Lookes Avenue, Balmain. During his teenage years he worked at a chemist shop. He attended Sydney Technical College before joining St Patrick's Seminary to study for the priesthood.

== Priesthood ==
Toohey was ordained as a deacon and served in Merrylands before being ordained to the priesthood on 21 August 1982 at St Mary's Cathedral, Sydney by Cardinal James Darcy Freeman.

Following his ordination he served as curate at Cabramatta. In 1986, he moved to Revesby and in 1989 to Lane Cove. In 1990, he went to Rome for further study and obtained a Licentiate in Theology from the Pontifical Gregorian University. He returned to Sydney in 1992 and was appointed to Penshurst where he served until 1995, when he was appointed Director of the Centre for Adult Education of the Archdiocese of Sydney. As a priest, he had an interest in astronomy.

== Episcopate ==
On 9 July 2001, Toohey was appointed Bishop of Wilcannia–Forbes by Pope John Paul II. He was consecrated as a bishop on 30 August 2001 by Archbishop George Pell at Holy Family Church, Parkes.

During his episcopacy, he became known as the "eco-bishop" for his passionate environmentalism.

On 29 April 2009, Toohey took sudden, extended leave, writing in a letter to clergy: "I have accepted some strong advice and have gone on extended leave. I would appreciate your prayers at this time."

On 9 June 2009, Toohey announced his resignation as Bishop of Wilcannia–Forbes, citing personal reasons and ill-health.

== Retirement ==
In 2011, Toohey issued an apology citing past hurtful and inappropriate behaviour as the reason for his resignation. “My behavior within the context of my relationships with some young adults in my pastoral care during the early years of my ministry was not consistent with that required of a good person,” he said. He added that he would not be returning to active ministry.

Toohey's retirement led to a five-year sede vacante period in the Diocese of Wilcannia–Forbes. This was ended in 2014 with the appointment of Columba Macbeth-Green. During this time, the future of the diocese was thrown into doubt, with plans to dissolve it entirely.

Catholic Church titles
Preceded by Barry Francis Collins	Bishop of Wilcannia–Forbes; 2001–2009	Succeeded by Columba Macbeth-Green
