= Giovanni Zerbini =

Italian-born Brazilian Roman Catholic prelate (born 1927)

The Most Reverend Giovanni Zerbini S.D.B.
- Bishop Emeritus of Guarapuava
- Church: Catholic Church
- Diocese: Guarapuava
- Appointed: 11 January 1995
- Term ended: 2 July 2003
- Predecessor: Albano Bortoletto Cavallin
- Successor: Antônio Wagner da Silva

Orders
- Ordination: 29 June 1956
- Consecration: 19 February 1995 by Bruno Foresti

Personal details
- Born: 29 December 1927 (age 98) Chiari, Lombardy, Kingdom of Italy
- Denomination: Roman Catholic
- Motto: Major est caritas

Giovanni Zerbini, S.D.B. (born 29 December 1927), known in Portuguese as João Zerbini, is an Italian-born Roman Catholic bishop who served as Bishop of Guarapuava in Brazil from 1995 to 2003. A member of the Salesians of Don Bosco, he spent most of his priestly and episcopal ministry in Brazil.

== Early life and priesthood ==
Giovanni Zerbini was born on 29 December 1927 in Chiari, in the region of Lombardy, Italy. He joined the Salesians of Don Bosco, a Roman Catholic religious congregation dedicated to education and missionary work.

He was ordained to the priesthood on 29 June 1956. Shortly thereafter, he was sent as a missionary to Brazil, where he carried out pastoral, educational, and ecclesial work for several decades.

== Episcopate ==
On 11 January 1995, Zerbini was appointed Bishop of the Diocese of Guarapuava by Pope John Paul II. He received episcopal consecration on 19 February 1995. The principal consecrator was Archbishop Bruno Foresti, with Bishop Vigilio Mario Olmi and Archbishop Pedro Antônio Marchetti Fedalto serving as co-consecrators.

Zerbini became the third bishop of Guarapuava, succeeding Albano Bortoletto Cavallin. During his episcopal ministry, he oversaw the pastoral and administrative life of the diocese, emphasizing evangelization, pastoral formation, and the strengthening of diocesan institutions.

Having reached the canonical age of retirement, he resigned from office on 2 July 2003 and was granted the title Bishop Emeritus of Guarapuava.

== Later life ==
After his resignation, Zerbini remained in Guarapuava, where he continued to live as bishop emeritus, maintaining a pastoral presence and participating in the spiritual life of the local Catholic community.
