= St Josephs Convent =

St Joseph's Convent of Mercy
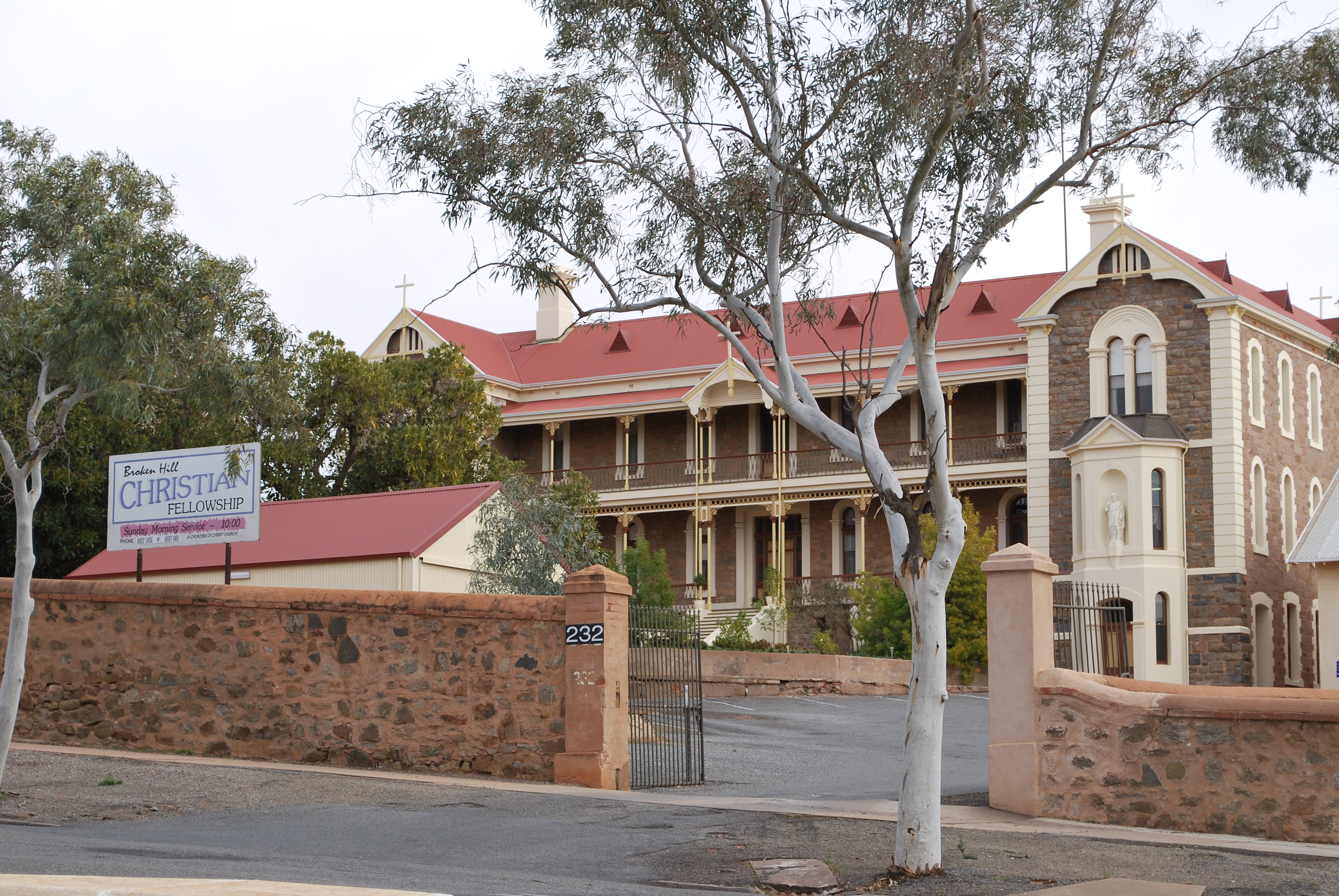

- Location within New South Wales Location within Australia
- 31.9529°S 141.4591°E
- Location: 232 Lane Street, Broken Hill, City of Broken Hill, New South Wales, Australia

History
- Built: 1891 - 1909
- Built for: The Sisters of Mercy

Site notes
- Architect: E. J. Woods
- Owner: Roman Catholic Diocese of Wilcannia-Forbes

New South Wales Heritage Register
- Official name: St. Josephs Convent, Chapel & Site (former); St Josephs Convent; Chapel & Site
- Type: state heritage (built)
- Designated: 2 April 1999
- Reference no.: 484
- Type: Convent/Nunnery
- Category: Religion

St Joseph's Convent is a heritage-listed former convent and chapel at 232 Lane Street, Broken Hill, City of Broken Hill, New South Wales, Australia. It is also known as Mount St Joseph's Convent of Mercy. It was designed by E. J. Woods and built from 1891. The property is owned by the Roman Catholic Diocese of Wilcannia-Forbes. It was added to the New South Wales State Heritage Register on 2 April 1999.

== History ==
Six sisters of the Sisters of Mercy had come to Broken Hill from Singleton in 1890 after the Bishop of Wilcannia, John Dunne, asked the sisters there to send a community to Broken Hill "for the welfare of the children". The sisters initially resided in a "very modest cottage" at the side of the present building, later removed.

The foundation stone for St Joseph's Convent was laid by Bishop Dunne in February 1891. Adelaide architect E. J. Woods designed the building, and local contractor Mr. Kelly was responsible for construction of the initial west wing. The first stage of the current building officially opened on 19 July 1891, although it was originally viewed as the "new wing" in conjunction with the original cottage, with further development planned as the growth of the town warranted it. The building would subsequently be completed in three separate contracts, the last c. 1907–08, with the original cottage demolished to make way for newer buildings in the 1950s to house the music rooms and Nun's Infirmary. The total cost of construction amounted to "just on £16,000".

The first floor was destroyed by fire in 1979. Following the fire, the Sisters of Mercy decided to sell the property and relocate the remaining nuns to the former Franciscan Friary in Murton Street, North Broken Hill.

It was purchased by a group of local property developers after the fire, who had plans to convert the complex into a private hospital. The heritage listing precluded external modification of the appearance of the listed buildings, so the plans fell through. The property was offered for sale again and in 1982, the Broken Hill Church of Christ purchased and subsequently refurbished the complex. The church used the former school rooms as a chapel for religious services and adapted the Convent as unit accommodation.

On 9 May 2019, the Broken Hill Church of Christ sold the property at auction to the Roman Catholic Diocese of Wilcannia-Forbes, who took possession on 11 July 2019.

== Heritage listing ==
St Josephs Convent was listed on the New South Wales State Heritage Register on 2 April 1999.
