= Diocese of Curitiba =

Diocese of Curitiba may refer to the following ecclesiastical jurisdictions with see in Curitiba, Brazil :

- the former suffragan Roman Catholic Diocese of Curitiba, now promoted to Metropolitan Archdiocese of Curitiba
- the present Anglican Diocese of Curitiba
