= Bernard J. Nolker =

American Catholic bishop (1912–2000)

Most Reverend Bernard J. Nolker, C.Ss.R., D.D.
- Bishop Emeritus of Paranaguá
- Church: Roman Catholic Church
- Province: Curitiba
- See: Paranaguá
- In office: January 7, 1963 —March 15, 1989
- Predecessor: None
- Successor: Alfred E. Novak, C.Ss.R.

Orders
- Ordination: June 18, 1939
- Consecration: April 25, 1963 by Lawrence Joseph Shehan

Personal details
- Born: September 25, 1912 Baltimore, Maryland, United States
- Died: January 17, 2000 (aged 87) Saratoga Springs, New York, United States

Bernard Joseph Nolker, C.Ss.R. (Portuguese: Bernardo José Nolker) (September 25, 1912 – January 17, 2000) was an American member of the Congregation of the Most Holy Redeemer, commonly known as the Redemptorists, who served as a missionary in Brazil for 45 years. He was named the first Bishop of the Diocese of Paranaguá in 1963.

== Biography ==
Nolker was born in Baltimore, Maryland, and grew up in the Wyman Park section of North Baltimore. As a teenager, he was educated at the Redemptorist minor seminary in North East, Pennsylvania, after which he was admitted to the congregation at their novitiate in Ilchester, Maryland, where he professed religious vows as a Redemptorist. He studied for the Catholic priesthood at Mount St. Alphonsus Seminary in Esopus, New York, where he was ordained on June 18, 1939.

Nolker had been serving as a missionary in Brazil since 1941, when Pope John XXIII named him on January 7, 1963, to be the first bishop of the newly created Diocese of Paranaguá. He was consecrated a bishop by Lawrence Joseph Shehan, the Archbishop of Baltimore, on the following April 25. The co-consecrators were Manoel da Silveira d’Elboux, Archbishop of Curitiba, and Edward John Harper, C.Ss.R., the Bishop of Saint Thomas. As a bishop, he attended sessions two, three and four of the Second Vatican Council and was then responsible for initiating the Council's reforms in the new diocese.

The Diocese of Paranaguá is located in southeastern Brazil and the region contains semitropical forests, mountains and a maritime region. In order to reach certain areas of the diocese, Nolker had to travel by horseback or a jeep. He served the diocese as its bishop for 26 years before Pope John Paul II accepted his resignation on March 15, 1989, and he was given the title of bishop emeritus.

Nolker died of heart failure at St. John Neumann Residence in Saratoga Springs, New York, at the age of 87.
