= Agostinho José Sartori =

Agostinho José Sartori O.F.M.Cap.
- Bishop of Palmas–Francisco Beltrão
- Church: Catholic Church
- Diocese: Diocese of Palmas–Francisco Beltrão
- In office: 16 February 1970 – 24 August 2005
- Predecessor: Carlos Eduardo de Saboia Bandeira de Melo
- Successor: José Antônio Peruzzo

Orders
- Ordination: 15 August 1952
- Consecration: 26 April 1970 by Umberto Mozzoni

Personal details
- Born: 29 May 1929 Capinzal, Santa Catarina, Brazil
- Died: 6 June 2012 (aged 83)

Agostinho José Sartori (29 May 1929 – 6 June 2012) was Bishop of the Roman Catholic Diocese of Palmas-Francisco Beltrão, Brazil.

== Career ==
Ordained to the priesthood in 1952, Sartori became a bishop in 1970 and retired on 24 August 2005.

== Death ==
Sartori was hospitalized on 26 May 2012. He died on 6 June of complications arising from Alzheimer's and Parkinson's disease.
