= Zerbini =

Zerbini is an Italian surname. Notable people with the surname include:

- Euryclides de Jesus Zerbini (1912–1993), Brazilian physician and cardiac surgeon
- Giovanni Zerbini (born 1927), Italian-born Brazilian Roman Catholic bishop
- Luciano Zerbini (born 1960), Italian discus thrower and shot putter
- Therezinha Zerbini (1928–2015), Brazilian attorney and feminist
