= Diocese of Piracicaba =

Catholic ecclesiastical territory

Diocese of Piracicaba Dioecesis Piracicabensis Diocese de Piracicaba

Location
- Country: Brazil
- Metropolitan: Archdiocese of Campinas
- Headquarters: Piracicaba, São Paulo, Brazil

Statistics
- Area: 4,663 km^{2} (1,800 sq mi)
- Population: Total; Catholics: (as of 2023); 1,028,202; 551,938 (53.7%)
- Parishes: 68

Information
- Denomination: Catholic Church
- Sui iuris church: Latin Church
- Rite: Roman Rite
- Established: 26 February 1944; 82 years ago
- Cathedral: Cathedral of Saint Anthony of Padua in Piracicaba
- Patron saint: Anthony of Padua
- Secular priests: 123 (67 Diocesan, 56 Religious Orders)

Current leadership
- Pope: Leo XIV
- Bishop: Devair Araújo da Fonseca
- Metropolitan Archbishop: João Inácio Müller, O.F.M.
- Bishops emeritus: Fernando Mason, O.F.M. Conv.

Map
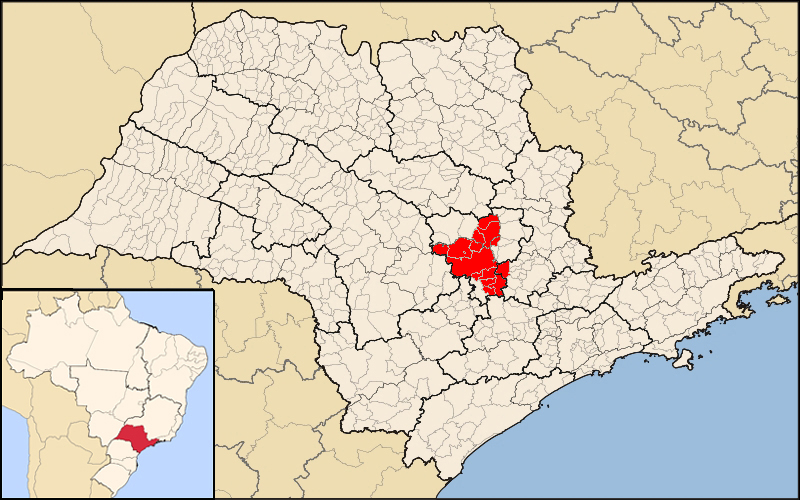
- Map showing the 15 municipalities that are part of the Diocese of Piracicaba

Website
- www.diocesedepiracicaba.org.br

The Roman Catholic Diocese of Piracicaba (Latin: Dioecesis Piracicabensis) is a diocese located in the city of Piracicaba in the ecclesiastical province of Campinas in Brazil.

== History ==
- 26 February 1944: Established as Diocese of Piracicaba from Diocese of Campinas

== Leadership ==
Bishops of Piracicaba (Roman rite)

- Ernesto de Paula (30 June 1945 – 9 January 1960), resigned
- Aníger de Francisco de Maria Melillo (29 May 1960 – 11 January 1984), resigned
- Eduardo Koaik (11 January 1984 – 15 May 2002), retired
- Moacyr José Vitti, C.S.S. (15 May 2002 – 19 May 2004), appointed Archbishop of Curitiba, Paraná
- Fernando Mason, O.F.M. Conv. (25 May 2005 – 11 November 2020), retired
- Devair Araújo da Fonseca (11 November 2020 – Present)

=== Coadjutor bishop ===
- Eduardo Koaik (1979-1984), succeeded
