= Red Bend Catholic College =

School in New South Wales, Australia

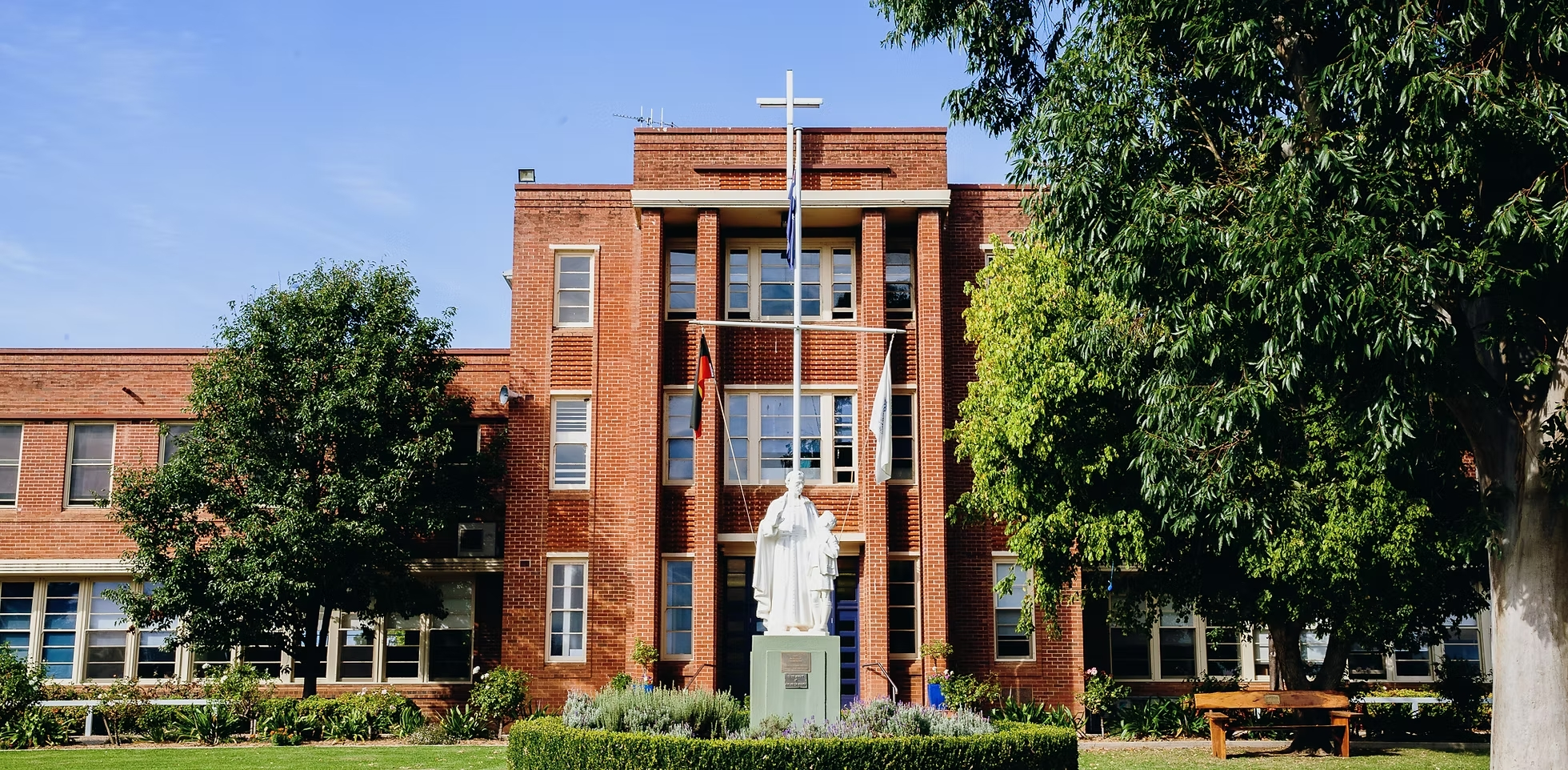
- Red Bend Catholic College and statue of Marcellin Champagnat

Location
- Forbes, New South Wales; Australia; 33°25′06″S 148°01′16″E

Information
- Former name: Marist Brothers' College, Forbes
- School type: Independent co-educational secondary day and boarding school
- Motto: Latin: Per Angusta Ad Augusta (Through Difficulty to Greatness)
- Denomination: Roman Catholic
- Established: 1926; 100 years ago (Johnson Street); 1955; 71 years ago (Red Bend)
- Founders: Marist Brothers
- Authority: Association of Marist Schools of Australia
- Principal: Mr Stephen Dwyer
- Chaplain: Fr Harry Phillips
- Staff: 102 (2026)
- Teaching staff: 97 FTE (2026)
- Enrolment: 933 (2026)
- Colours: Navy and sky blue
- Song: Sub tuum praesidium
- Website: redbendcc.nsw.edu.au

Red Bend Catholic College is an independent Roman Catholic co-educational secondary day and boarding school located in Forbes in the Central West region of New South Wales, Australia. The college is run by the Marist Brothers, a religious institute and under the authority of Marist Schools Australia. Established in 1926, the college has enrolled approximately 960 students from Year 7 to Year 12.

The College is situated within the ecclesiastical jurisdiction of the Diocese of Wilcannia-Forbes. The Diocesan Bishop, Columba Macbeth-Green is also an ex-student of the College

== History ==
Marist Brothers' College, Forbes had a School building in Johnson St, Forbes. In 1939, the Bishop purchased the now current site along the Lachlan River. WWII prevented any building.

On the 6th of November, 1955 the first classes commenced at the Red Bend site as the location of Marist Brothers' College, Forbes.

Prior to 1977, the Catholic education of students in this region was provided by three secondary schools; Our Lady of Mercy College, Forbes; Our Lady of Mercy High School, Parkes; and Marist Brothers' College on Johnson St, Forbes.

In February 1977, these three schools combined to form one co-educational High School from years 7-12, with the name of Red Bend Catholic College, at the site of the former Marist Brothers' College, on the banks of the Lachlan River. This merger brought together the teaching traditions of the Mercy Sisters and the Marist Brothers.

In July 2026, Red Bend Catholic College celebrated 100 years of Marist Education in Forbes.

== Principals ==
The following individuals have served as College Principal:

Officeholders	Term start	Term end	Time in office	Notes
Br Paul Gilchrist	1988	1993	5-6 years	
Br Gregory McCrystal	1994	1999	4-5 years	
Br John Furlong	2000	2004	3-4 years	
Br John Hillet	2005	2012	7-8 years	
Br Michael Flanagan	2013	2019	5–6 years	
Mr Stephen Dwyer	2019	incumbent	incumbent	First lay teacher to become Principal

== House system ==
In 1943, four houses were established (Basil, Denis, Loyola and Xavier) at the Johnson Street School, this was prior to College's move to Red Bend. In 2014, two new houses (Chisholm and McAuley) were introduced. In 2025, an additional two new houses (Mackillop and O'Connor) were introduced.

House	Colour	Motto	Name origin	Mascot
Basil	Green	"Action Not Words"	Br Basil Monchalin	Bullfrogs
Chisholm	Orange		Caroline Chisholm	Cheetahs
Denis	Red	"Second to None"	Br Denis	Dragons
Loyola	Yellow	"Leading the Way with Strength and Honour"	St Ignatius of Loyola	Lions
MacKillop	Light Blue		St Mary MacKillop	Mavricks
McAuley	Purple		Catherine McAuley	Cobras
O'Connor	Pink	"Superbia in Excellentia"	Eileen O'Connor	Panthers
Xavier	Blue	"Determination, Participation, Success"	Francis Xavier	Sharks

== See also ==
- List of Catholic schools in New South Wales
- Catholic education in Australia
