= Diocese of Paranaguá =

Catholic ecclesiastical territory

Diocese of Paranaguá Dioecesis Paranaguensis Diocese de Paranaguá

Location
- Country: Brazil
- Metropolitan: Archdiocese of Curitiba
- Headquarters: Paranaguá, Paraná, Brazil

Statistics
- Area: 11,537 km^{2} (4,454 sq mi)
- Population: Total; Catholics: (as of 2023); 543,000; 419,000 (77.2%)
- Parishes: 20

Information
- Denomination: Catholic Church
- Sui iuris church: Latin Church
- Rite: Roman Rite
- Established: 21 July 1962; 64 years ago
- Cathedral: Catedral de Nossa Senhora do Santíssimo Rosário in Paranaguá
- Patron saint: Our Lady of the Rosary

Current leadership
- Pope: Leo XIV
- Bishop: Paulo Alves Romão
- Metropolitan Archbishop: José Antônio Peruzzo
- Bishops emeritus: Edmar Peron

Website
- Website of the Diocese

The Roman Catholic Diocese of Paranaguá (Latin: Dioecesis Paranaguensis) is a diocese located in the city of Paranaguá in the ecclesiastical province of Curitiba in Brazil.

== History ==
- 21 July 1962: Established as Diocese of Paranaguá from the Metropolitan Archdiocese of Curitiba

== Leadership ==
Bishops of Paranaguá (Roman rite)

- Bernard J. Nolker, C.Ss.R. (7 January 1963 – 15 March 1989), retired
- Alfred E. Novak, C.Ss.R. (15 March 1989 – 2 August 2006), retired
- João Alves dos Santos, O.F.M. Cap. (2 August 2006 – 9 April 2015)
  - Apostolic Administrator Francisco Carlos Bach (May 2015 – 17 December 2015), Bishop of São José dos Pinhais, Paraná
- Edmar Peron (25 November 2015 – 20 May 2025), resigned
  - Apostolic Administrator Bruno Elizeu Versari (20 May 2025 – 27 September 2025), Bishop of Ponta Grossa, Paraná
- Paulo Alves Romão (20 August 2025 – Present)
