= Antônio Wagner da Silva =

Brazilian Roman Catholic bishop (born 1944)

The Most Reverend Antônio Wagner da Silva S.C.I.
- Bishop Emeritus of Guarapuava
- Church: Catholic Church
- Diocese: Guarapuava
- Installed: 2 July 2003
- Term ended: 6 May 2020
- Predecessor: Giovanni Zerbini
- Successor: Amilton Manoel da Silva
- Previous post: Coadjutor Bishop of Guarapuava (2000–2003)

Orders
- Ordination: 11 December 1971
- Consecration: 18 June 2000 by Giovanni Zerbini

Personal details
- Born: Antônio Wagner da Silva; 25 March 1944 (age 82) Luz, Minas Gerais, Brazil
- Motto: Sint Unum

Antônio Wagner da Silva S.C.I. (born 25 March 1944) is a Brazilian Roman Catholic prelate who served as the fourth bishop of Guarapuava, in the state of Paraná, Brazil, from 2003 until his retirement in 2020. A member of the Congregation of the Priests of the Sacred Heart, he was appointed coadjutor bishop of Guarapuava in March 2000 and succeeded Bishop Giovanni Zerbini in July 2003. Pope Francis accepted his resignation on 6 May 2020.

== Early life and education ==
Antônio Wagner da Silva was born on 25 March 1944 in Luz, Minas Gerais, Brazil. He entered the formation programme of the Congregation of the Priests of the Sacred Heart (Dehonians) in Lavras, Minas Gerais. His ecclesiastical education included preparatory studies at the Dehonian Apostolic School in Lavras, studies in Corupá, philosophy studies in Brusque, and theology studies at the Institute of Theology of the Sacred Heart of Jesus in Taubaté, São Paulo.

He made his first religious profession on 2 February 1966 and was ordained a priest on 11 December 1971 in the parish church of Formiga, Minas Gerais.

== Priesthood ==
Following his ordination, da Silva held several positions within the Dehonian congregation. He worked as a professor and formator at the Dehonian seminary in Curitiba from 1972 to 1975 and served as rector of the minor seminary in Terra Boa, Paraná, from 1975 to 1976. He subsequently held leadership and administrative positions at the congregation's seminary in Curitiba, served as a provincial councillor, and worked in vocational ministry and formation. He was also rector of the congregation's philosophical institute in Brusque from 1988 to 1993.

In 1994, he became parish priest of the Sacred Heart of Jesus parish in Joinville, Santa Catarina, while continuing his responsibilities as a provincial councillor.

== Episcopacy ==
=== Coadjutor bishop of Guarapuava ===
On 29 March 2000, Pope John Paul II appointed da Silva coadjutor bishop of the Diocese of Guarapuava. At the time of his appointment, he was parish priest in Joinville and a provincial councillor of his religious congregation.

He received episcopal consecration on 18 June 2000 in Guarapuava. His episcopal motto was Sint Unum, Latin for "That they may be one".

=== Bishop of Guarapuava ===
On 2 July 2003, following the acceptance of the resignation of Bishop Giovanni Zerbini, da Silva succeeded him as diocesan bishop of Guarapuava. The appointment was announced by the Holy See Press Office.

During his episcopate, da Silva served as the diocese's principal pastor and participated in the pastoral life of the local Catholic community. In a 2018 interview with the diocesan communications centre, published by Diário Reservense, he reflected on his childhood, family life, religious vocation, priesthood, and appointment as bishop. He recalled that his desire to become a priest had emerged during primary school.

Da Silva was the fourth bishop of Guarapuava, a diocese established in 1965 in Paraná, Brazil.

=== Retirement ===
On 6 May 2020, Pope Francis accepted da Silva's resignation from the pastoral governance of the Diocese of Guarapuava and appointed Amilton Manoel da Silva, a Passionist priest and auxiliary bishop of the Archdiocese of Curitiba, as his successor. Antônio Wagner da Silva thereby became bishop emeritus of Guarapuava.

Catholic Church titles
Preceded by Giovanni Zerbini	Bishop of Guarapuava; 2003–2020	Succeeded by Amilton Manoel da Silva
