= Sacred Heart Cathedral, Broken Hill =

Roman Catholic cathedral in Broken Hill, Australia

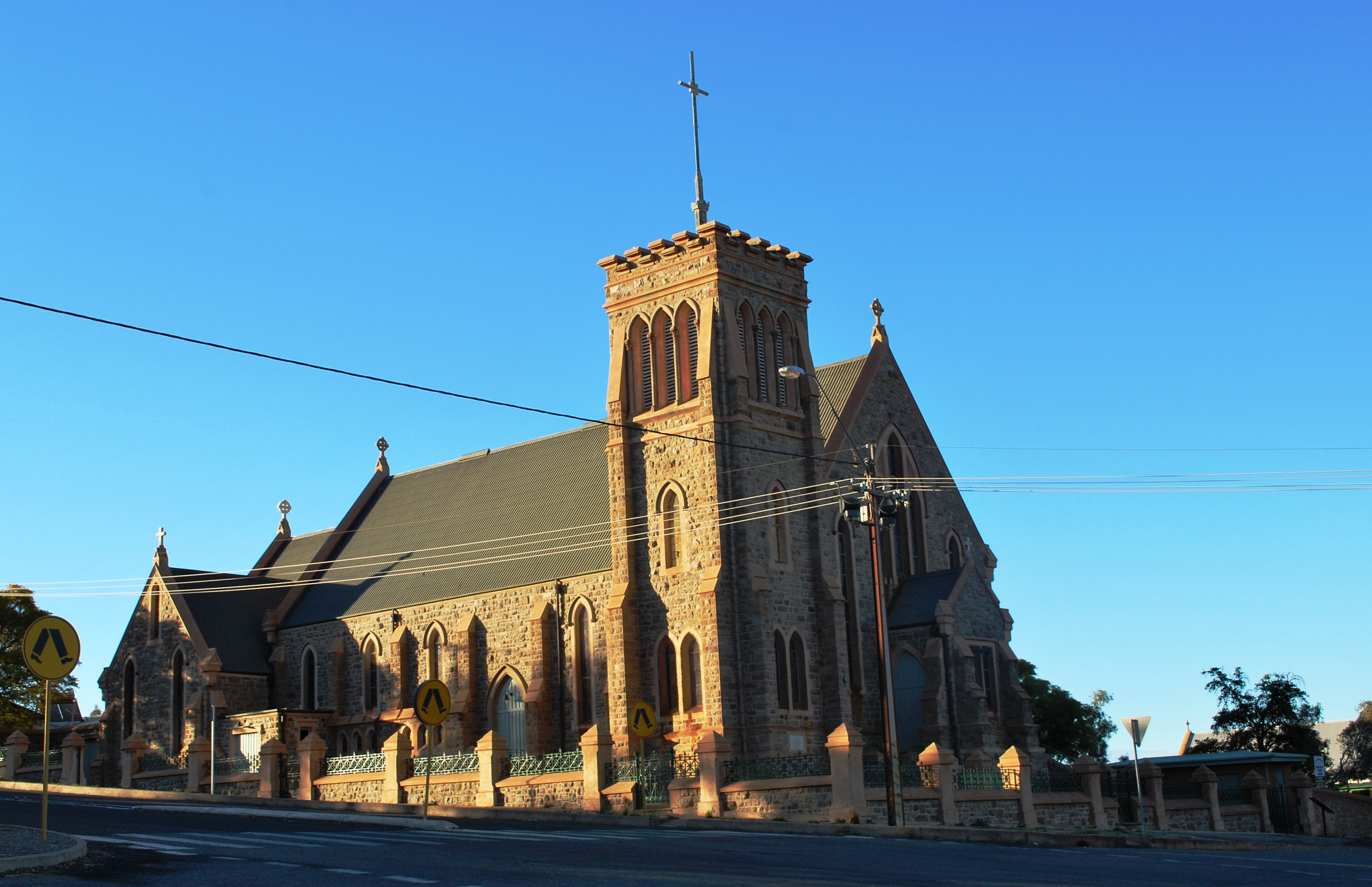

Religion
- Affiliation: Roman Catholic Latin Rite
- District: Diocese of Wilcannia-Forbes
- Ecclesiastical or organizational status: Cathedral
- Leadership: Columba Macbeth-Green OSPPE
- Year consecrated: 2 July 1905

Location
- Location: Broken Hill, Australia
- Interactive map of Sacred Heart Cathedral, Broken Hill
- Coordinates: 31°57′12″S 141°27′30″E

Architecture
- Architect: W. T. Knox
- Type: Church
- Groundbreaking: 6 December 1903 (initial foundation stone laid)
- Completed: 2 July 1905

Sacred Heart Cathedral, Broken Hill is the cathedral church of the Roman Catholic Diocese of Wilcannia-Forbes and the seat of the Catholic Bishop of Wilcannia-Forbes, currently the Most Reverend Columba Macbeth-Green OSPPE.

== History ==
The Diocese of Wilcannia was erected by Pope Leo XIII in 1887, on territories taken from the neighbouring Armidale, Bathurst and Goulburn dioceses, with John Dunne was consecrated as the first bishop. On 7 August 1887, Sacred Heart Roman Catholic Church was opened behind the bishop's residence and was used as the diocese' initial cathedral. The church was built from iron and stone in a Gothic style. The church still stands today and is used as a hall.

In June 1903, a meeting of over 800 people took place on the site of the Sacred Heart Church to discuss building a new cathedral for the diocese that would also serve as the city's parish church. The Sisters of Mercy donated the corner of their convent land for the cathedral to be built on. W. T. Knox was employed as the architect for the new cathedral, under the supervision of Bishop Dunne. The cathedral was made out of silver quarry stone, left over from the neighbouring silver mines, which was donated to the diocese by the North silver mines of Broken Hill. The foundation stone for the cathedral was place by Bishop Dunne on 6 December 1903.

The cathedral was opened and consecrated by Bishop Dunne on 2 July 1905. The construction was completed at a cost of 7,000 pounds. Approximately 1,500 people attended the opening of the cathedral, including Archbishop of Melbourne, Archbishop Thomas Carr and Coadjutor Archbishop Michael Kelly of Sydney.
