= Barry Francis Collins =

Australian Roman Catholic prelate (1938–2000)

His Excellency Barry Francis Collins
- Bishop of Wilcannia–Forbes
- Metropolis: Sydney
- Appointed: 30 March 1994
- Installed: 3 June 1994
- Term ended: 15 November 2000
- Predecessor: Douglas Warren
- Successor: Christopher Henry Toohey

Orders
- Ordination: 15 July 1961 at St Mary's Cathedral, Sydney by Norman Gilroy
- Consecration: 3 June 1994; Holy Family Church, Parkes by Edward Clancy

Personal details
- Born: 10 November 1938 Waitara, New South Wales
- Died: 15 November 2000 (aged 62) Forbes, New South Wales
- Buried: Forbes, New South Wales
- Motto: Gaudium et spes

Barry Francis Collins (10 November 1938 – 15 November 2000) was an Australian Roman Catholic prelate.

== Early life ==
Collins was born on 10 November 1938 to Arthur and Mary Collins. He was raised in Waitara, New South Wales and attended St Pius X College in Chatswood, where he was educated alongside Michael Malone and Peter Ingham, who would also go on to be bishops. After graduating, he entered St Columba's College, Springwood before moving to St Patrick's Seminary, Manly where he completed his studies for the priesthood.

== Priesthood ==
Collins was ordained a priest for the Archdiocese of Sydney on 15 July 1961 at St Mary's Cathedral, Sydney by Cardinal Norman Thomas Gilroy. He was one of 28 in his ordination class. His first appointment was as assistant priest in Central Bankstown.

In 1965, when the Randwick North parish was created, Collins was appointed assistant priest. In 1981, he became assistant priest of Maroubra, while also working for the Catholic Education Office.

In 1986, he was appointed Moderator of Mortlake, alongside Fr John Usher. In 1993, he became parish priest of the same parish.

== Episcopacy ==
On 30 March 1994, Collins was appointed Bishop of Wilcannia–Forbes by Pope John Paul II, following the retirement of Bishop Douglas Warren. He was consecrated on 3 June 1994 at Holy Family Church, Parkes by Cardinal Edward Bede Clancy.

In 1998, he attended the first ever Synod of Bishops Special Assembly for Oceania in Rome, along with all the bishops of Australia, New Zealand, Papua New Guinea and the Pacific Island nations.

During is episcopacy, he always made time to visit the parishes of his vast Diocese, which took in more than half the geographic area of New South Wales. He was forced to implement new pastoral strategies due to the limited number of priests available to minister in such a vast diocese. He granted approval for appointed people to be ministers for funeral in special circumstances.

He also established CatholicCare Wilcannia–Forbes on 23 January 1996, opening offices in Forbes, Narromine and Bourke.

== Death ==
Collins died suddenly in Forbes, New South Wales, on 15 November 2000 while still in office, at the age of 62. He was buried in Forbes Cemetery.

Catholic Church titles
Preceded by Douglas Warren	Bishop of Wilcannia–Forbes; 1994–2000	Succeeded by Christopher Henry Toohey
