= João Alves dos Santos =

Brazilian Roman Catholic bishop

João Alves dos Santos O.F.M. Cap.
- Bishop of Paranaguá
- Church: Catholic Church
- Diocese: Diocese of Paranaguá
- In office: 2 August 2006 – 9 April 2015
- Predecessor: Alfred E. Novak
- Successor: Edmar Peron

Orders
- Ordination: 4 December 1982
- Consecration: 30 September 2006 by Cláudio Hummes

Personal details
- Born: 9 December 1956 Alto Alegre, São Paulo, Republic of the United States of Brazil
- Died: 9 April 2015 (aged 58)

João Alves dos Santos (9 December 1956 – 9 April 2015) was a Roman Catholic bishop.

Ordained to the priesthood in 1982, Alves dos Santos was named bishop of the Roman Catholic Diocese of Paranaguá, Brazil in 2006. He died while still in office.
