= Ladislau Biernaski =

Ladislau Biernaski (24 October 1937 – 13 February 2012) was the bishop of the Roman Catholic Diocese of São José dos Pinhais in Brazil.

Born in Almirante Tamandaré, Biernaski was ordained in 1963. He became a bishop in 1979 and died in office, aged 74, from cancer.
