= Cathedral Basilica Minor of Our Lady of Light, Curitiba =

Coordinates: 25.4286°S 49.2714°W

Cathedral Basilica Minor of Our Lady of Light
- Catedral Basílica Menor Nossa Senhora da Luz
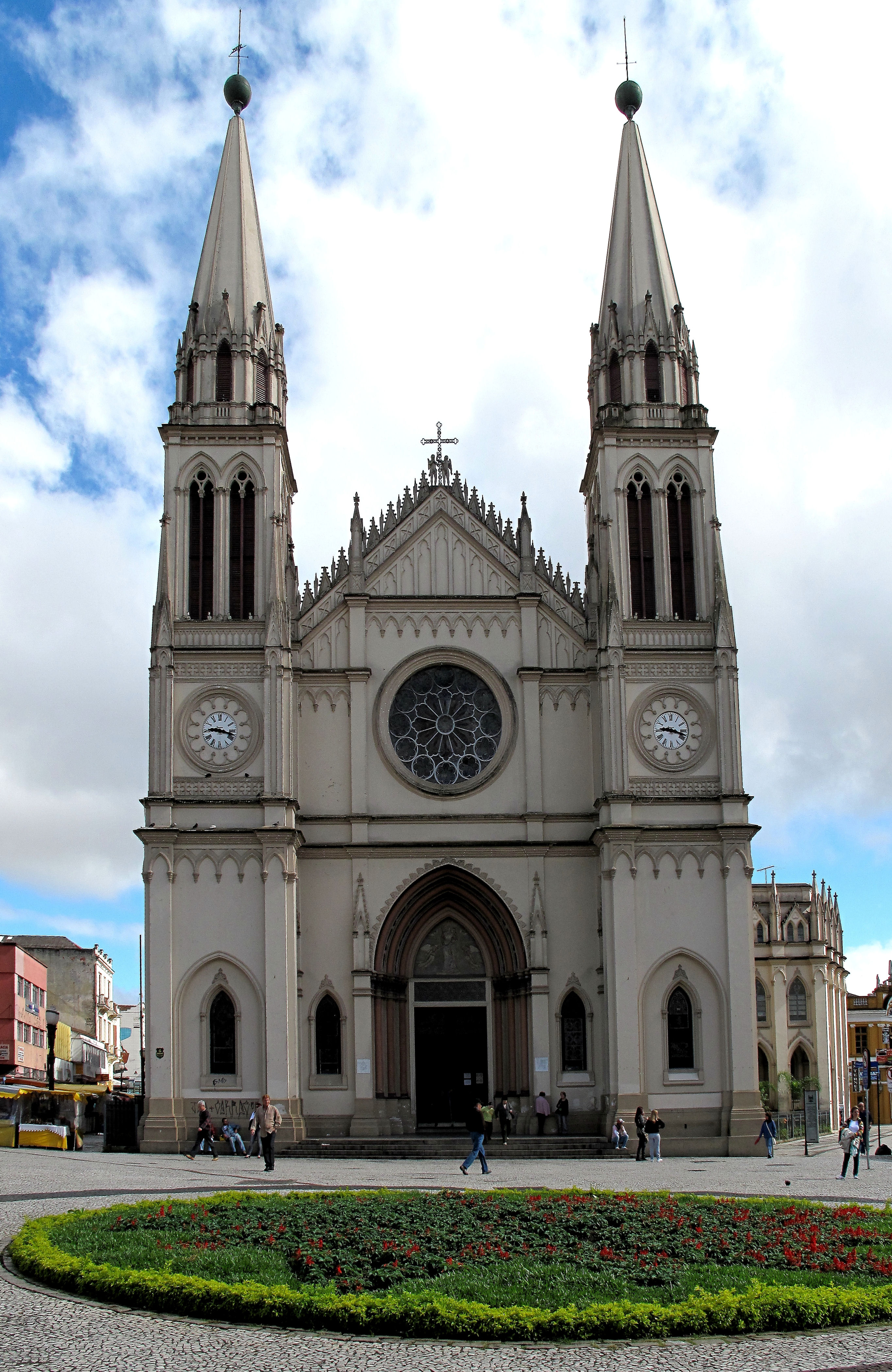
- Cathedral Basilica Minor of Our Lady of Light
- Location: Curitiba
- Country: Brazil
- Denomination: Roman Catholic Church

Administration
- Archdiocese: Curitiba

The Cathedral Basilica Minor of Our Lady of Light (Portuguese: Catedral Basílica Menor Nossa Senhora da Luz), also called Curitiba Cathedral, is a Catholic church in the city of Curitiba, in the state of Paraná in Brazil. In 1668, a small wooden church was built on the site, in the old town of Curitiba today, with a church dedicated to Our Lady of Light and Jesus.

In 1693, the City Council was established in the place in order to elect the first municipal authorities. On March 29 of the same year, the foundation of the town of Nossa Senhora da Luz e do Bom Jesus dos Pinhais Curitiba became official.

Years later, it gave way to a larger church in stone and clay, completed in 1721, called the church headquarters. That, in turn, was demolished between 1875 and 1880, to finally build the present cathedral, which work was carried out between 1876 and 1893.

== See also ==
- Roman Catholicism in Brazil
- Our Lady of Light (disambiguation)

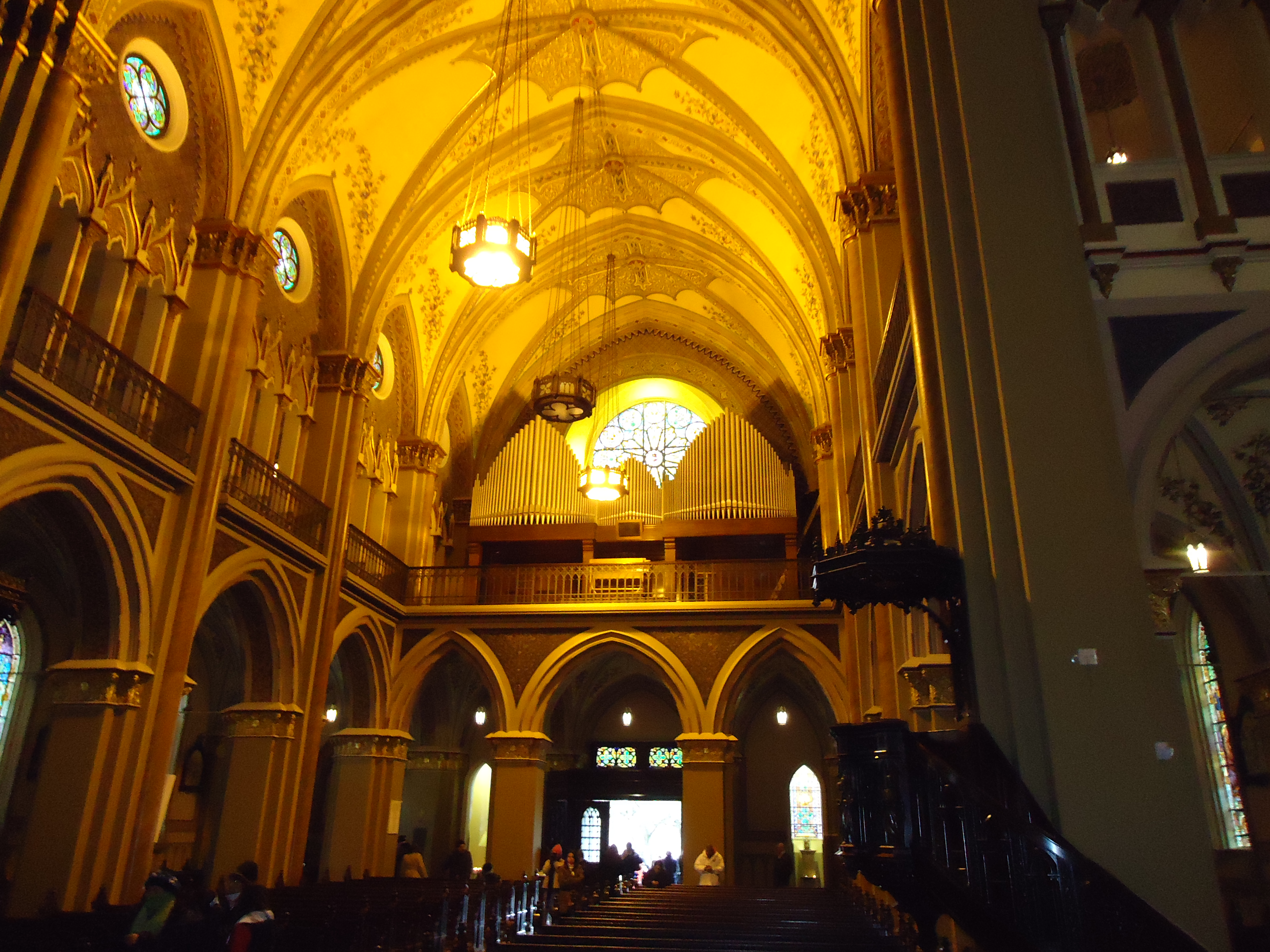
Internal view
