= Capinzal =

Municipality in Santa Catarina, Brazil

- Municipality
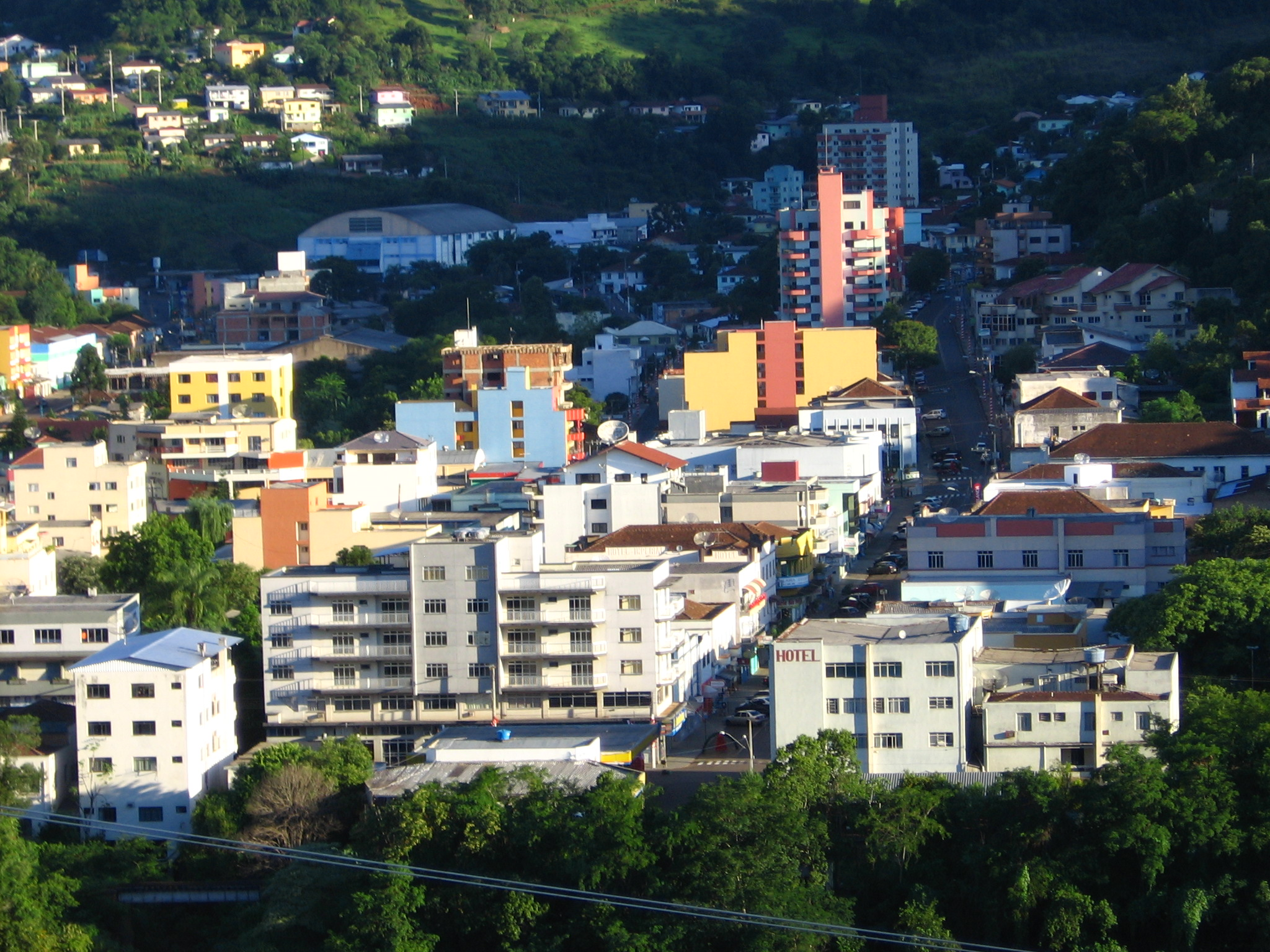

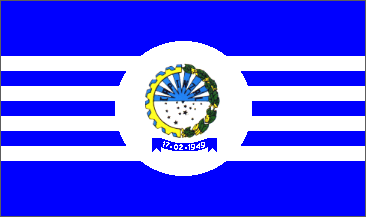
- Flag Coat of arms

- Location in Brazil
- Coordinates: 27.3439°S 51.6119°W
- Country: Brazil
- Region: South
- State: Santa Catarina
- Mesoregion: Oeste Catarinense

Population (2020)
  - Total: 23,035
- Time zone: UTC -3

Capinzal is a municipality in the state of Santa Catarina in the South region of Brazil.

== See also ==
- List of municipalities in Santa Catarina
