= Moacyr José Vitti =

Moacyr José Vitti CSS
- Archbishop of Curitiba
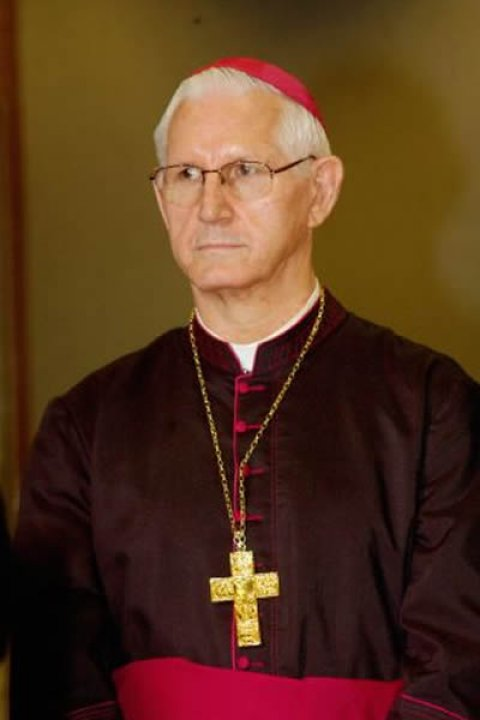
- Church: Catholic Church
- Archdiocese: Archdiocese of Curitiba
- In office: 19 May 2004 – 26 June 2014
- Predecessor: Pedro Antônio Marchetti Fedalto
- Successor: José Antônio Peruzzo
- Previous posts: Bishop of Piracicaba (2002-2004); Auxiliary Bishop of Curitiba (1987-2002); Titular Bishop of Sita (1987-2002)

Orders
- Ordination: 16 December 1967
- Consecration: 3 January 1988 by Pedro Antônio Marchetti Fedalto

Personal details
- Born: 30 November 1940 Piracicaba, São Paulo, Brazil
- Died: 26 June 2014 (aged 73)

Moacyr José Vitti (30 November 1940 – 26 June 2014) was a Catholic archbishop.

Ordained to the priesthood in 1967, Vitti was named titular bishop of Sita and auxiliary bishop of the Roman Catholic Archdiocese of Curitiba, Brazil in 1988. In 2002 he was named bishop of the Roman Catholic Diocese of Piracicaba and then in 2004 was appointed Archbishop of Curitiba. He died on 26 June 2014, at the age of 73.
