= Diocese of Guarapuava =

Catholic ecclesiastical territory

Diocese of Guarapuava Dioecesis Guarapuavensis Diocese de Guarapuava
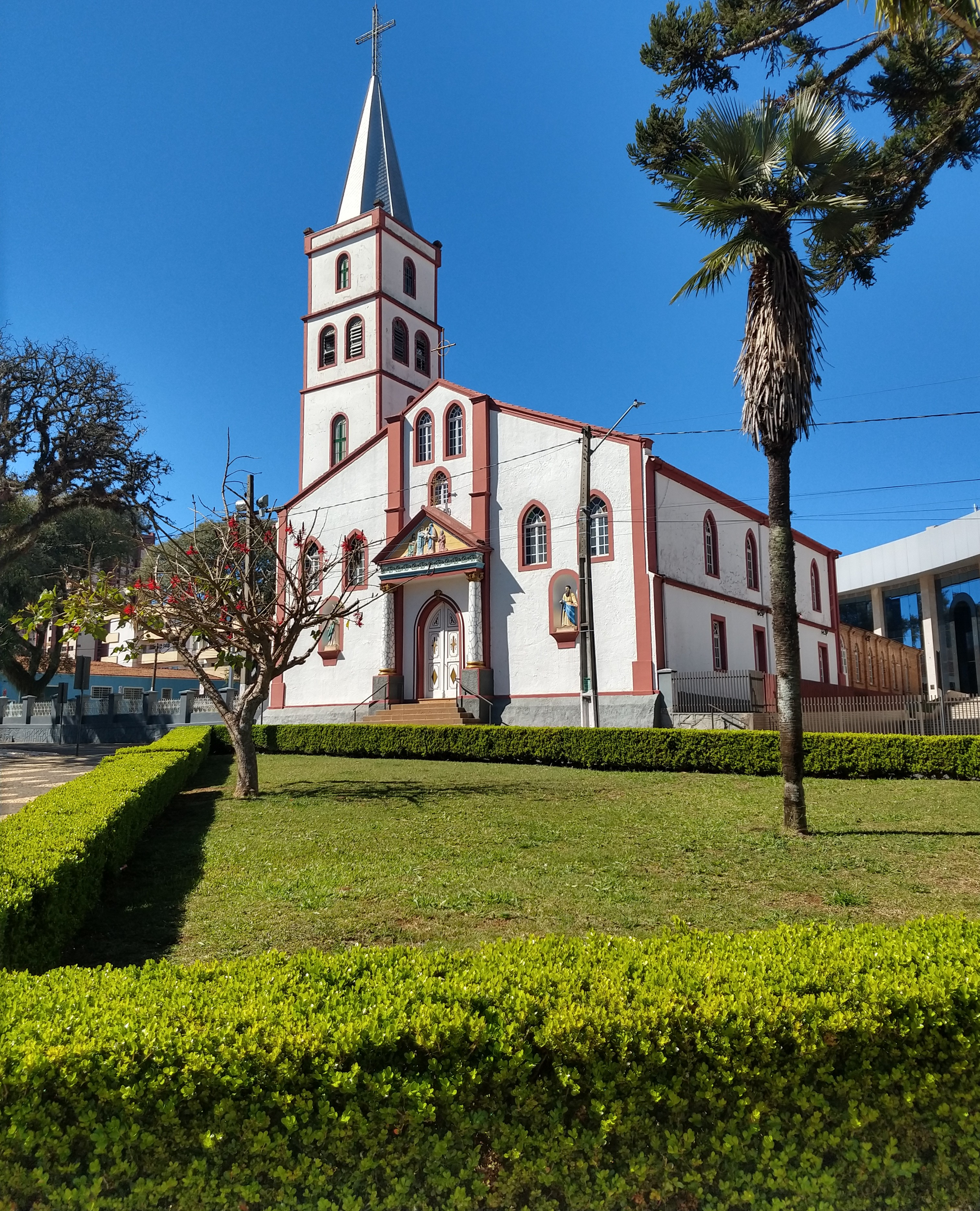
- Cathedral of Guarapuava

Location
- Country: Brazil
- Ecclesiastical province: Curitiba
- Metropolitan: Curitiba

Statistics
- Area: 27,360 km^{2} (10,560 sq mi)
- Population: Total; Catholics: (as of 2013); 608,000; 577,000 (94.9%)

Information
- Rite: Latin Rite
- Established: 16 December 1965 (60 years ago)
- Cathedral: Cathedral of Our Lady of Bethlehem
- Patron saint: Our Lady of Bethlehem

Current leadership
- Pope: Leo XIV
- Bishop: Amilton Manoel da Silva, C.P.
- Metropolitan Archbishop: José Antônio Peruzzo
- Bishops emeritus: Giovanni Zerbini, SDB; Antônio Wagner da Silva, S.C.J.

Website
- Website of the Diocese

The Roman Catholic Diocese of Guarapuava (Latin: Dioecesis Guarapuavensis) is a diocese located in the city of Guarapuava in the ecclesiastical province of Curitiba in Brazil.

== History ==
- December 16, 1965: Established as Diocese of Guarapuava from the Diocese of Campo Mourão, Diocese of Ponta Grossa and Diocese of Toledo
- December 8, 2025: The Dicastery for Divine Worship and the Discipline of the Sacraments confirmed the patronage of the Blessed Virgin Mary as "Nossa Senhora de Belém" over the diocese and the municipality.

== Bishops ==
- Bishops of Guarapuava (Roman rite)
  - Bishop Friedrich Helmel, S.V.D. (1966.03.19 – 1986.09.27)
  - Bishop Albano Bortoletto Cavallin (1986.10.24 – 1992.03.11), appointed Archbishop of Londrina, Parana
  - Bishop Giovanni Zerbini, S.D.B. (1995.01.11 – 2003.07.02)
  - Bishop Antônio Wagner da Silva, S.C.J. (2003.07.02 – 2020.05.06)
  - Bishop Amilton Manoel da Silva, C.P. (2020.05.06 - present)

=== Coadjutor bishop ===
- Antônio Wagner da Silva, S.C.I. (2000-2003)
