= Pedro Fedalto =

Brazilian Roman Catholic bishop (1926–2026)

The Most Reverend Pedro Fedalto
- Archbishop of Curitiba
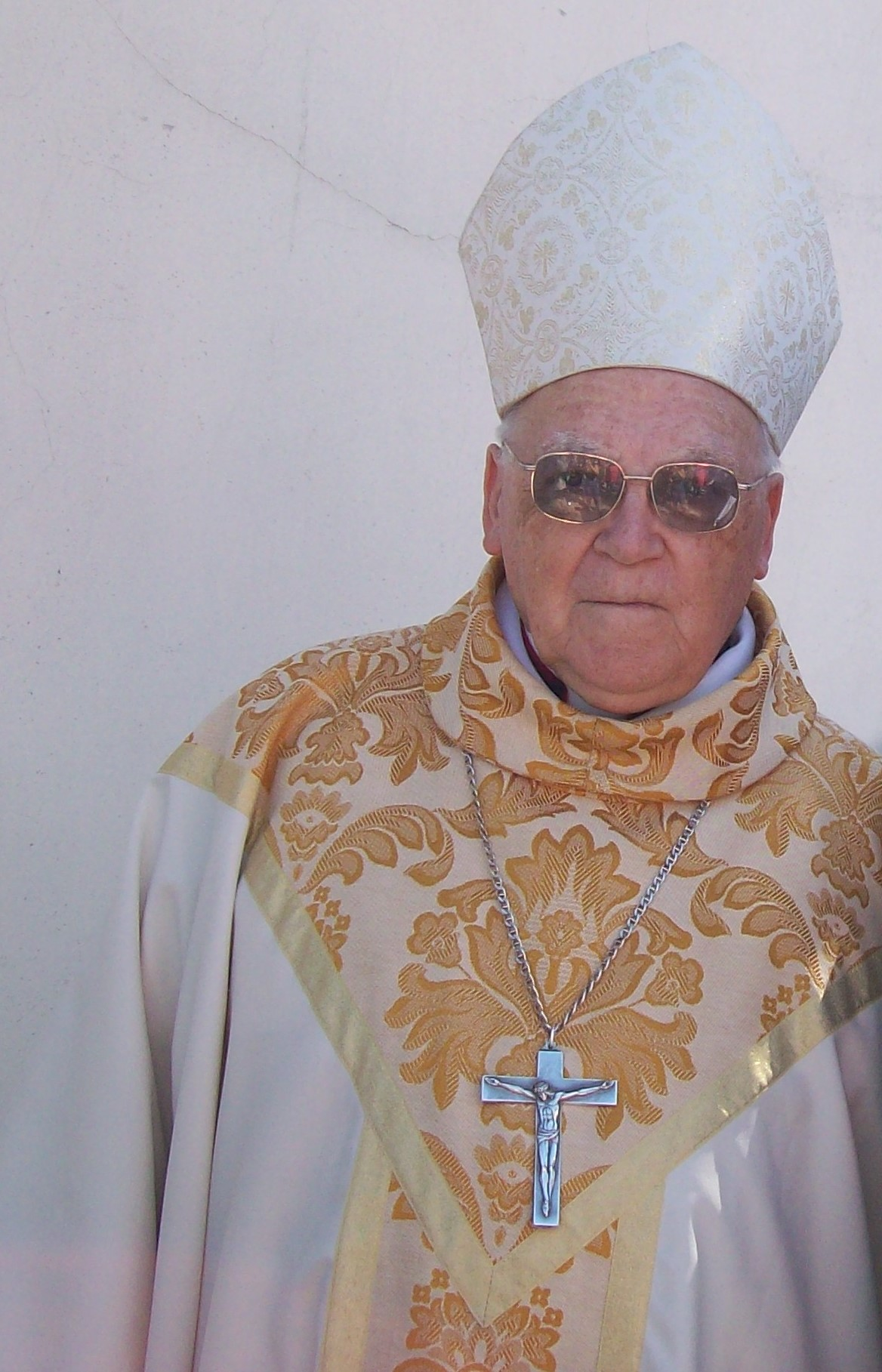
- Fedalto in 2010
- Appointed: 28 December 1970
- Term ended: 19 May 2004
- Predecessor: Manoel da Silveira d’Elboux
- Successor: Moacyr José Vitti
- Previous posts: Titular Bishop of Castellum Tatroportus and Auxiliary Bishop of Curitiba (1966–1970)

Orders
- Ordination: 6 December 1953 by Manoel da Silveira d’Elboux
- Consecration: 28 August 1966 by Sebastiano Baggio, Manuel da Silveira d’Elboux, Jerônimo Mazzarotto

Personal details
- Born: Pedro Antônio Marchetti Fedalto; 11 August 1926 Colônia Antônio Rebouças, Campo Largo, Paraná, Brazil
- Died: 26 September 2026 (aged 100) Curitiba, Paraná, Brazil
- Parents: Giácomo Fedalto; Corona Marchetti
- Education: Central Seminary of the Immaculate Conception of Ipiranga
- Motto: Veritatem in caritate
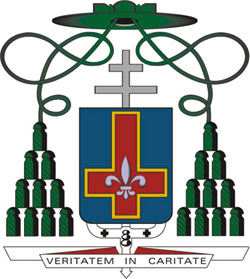
- Coat of arms

Styles of Pedro Antônio Marchetti Fedalto
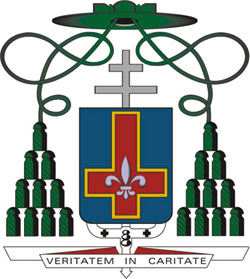
- Reference style: His Excellency; The Most Reverend
- Spoken style: Your Excellency
- Religious style: Archbishop

Pedro Antônio Marchetti Fedalto (11 August 1926 – 26 September 2026) was a Brazilian Roman Catholic prelate who served as an auxiliary bishop (1966–1970) and later as a metropolitan archbishop (1970–2004) of the Archdiocese of Curitiba.

== Life and career ==
Fedalto was born in Colônia Antônio Rebouças, Campo Largo, Paraná, to the family of Giácomo Fedalto and Corona Marchetti of Italian descent. He studied at the Central Seminary of the Immaculate Conception of Ipiranga, São Paulo, and was ordained priest at the Cathedral Basilica Minor of Our Lady of Light, Curitiba, for his native Archdiocese of Curitiba, on 6 December 1953.

In the same year he became a chaplain of the College of the Sisters of Divine Providence and after worked as a professor and spiritual director at the Queen of the Apostles Major Seminary and chancellor of the Archdiocese of Curitiba.

On 30 May 1966, Pope Paul VI appointed him as a Titular Bishop of Castellum Tatroportus and Auxiliary Bishop of Archdiocese of Curitiba and he received the episcopal consecration on 28 August of the same year from Apostolic Nuncio to Brazil, archbishop Sebastiano Baggio as a principal consecrator, and a co-consecrators Manoel da Silveira d’Elboux, archbishop of Curitiba and Jerônimo Mazzarotto, auxiliary bishop of Curitiba at the Cathedral Basilica Minor of Our Lady of Light in Curitiba.

On 28 December 1970, he was transferred as a Metropolitan Archbishop to the see of Curitiba and on 19 May 2004 he retired from the pastoral governance of the diocese because of the age limit.

Fedalto died in Curitiba on 26 September 2026 at the age of 100.

Catholic Church titles
Preceded by Manoel da Silveira d’Elboux	Archbishop of Curitiba; 1970–2004	Succeeded by Moacyr José Vitti
Preceded by Position established	Titular Bishop of Castellum Tatroportus; 1966–1970	Succeeded by Valentino Giacomo Lazzari
Preceded by —	Auxiliary Bishop of Curitiba; 1966–1970	Succeeded by —
