= Walter Michael Ebejer =

Maltese bishop (1929–2021)

His Excellency Walter Michael Ebejer O.P.
- Bishop of União da Vitória
- Church: Roman Catholic
- Diocese: Diocese of União da Vitória
- Appointed: 3 December 1976
- In office: 1976–2007
- Successor: João Bosco Barbosa de Sousa

Orders
- Ordination: 24 January 1954
- Consecration: 6 March 1977 by Carmine Rocco
- Rank: Bishop

Personal details
- Born: 3 August 1929 Dingli, Malta
- Died: 11 June 2021 (aged 91) União da Vitória, Brazil
- Denomination: Catholic

Walter Michael Ebejer (3 August 1929 – 11 June 2021) was a Maltese-born Brazilian missionary, lecturer and a bishop of the Catholic church. From 1977 to 2007 he served as Bishop of União da Vitória in Brazil.

== Biography ==
Ebejer was born in Dingli, Malta on 3 August 1929. He joined the Dominican Order and pursued his studies at St Thomas Aquinas College in Rabat, Malta and then continued with his education in the UK. On 24 January 1954, Ebejer was ordained priest of the Dominican Order at the age of 24. In 1956 he graduated in philosophy and theology from St Thomas Aquinas College in Rabat and later, in 1973, he graduated and acquired his licence in theology summa cum laude from the Angelicum in Rome.

In 1957 Ebejer went to Brazil as missionary in the state of Goiás. From 1961 until 1969 he did pastoral work in north of Parana and was superior of Maltese Dominican order from 1969 until 1973. Later he was appointed professor at the Pontifical Catholic University of Paraná and at the Studium Theologicum Catholic University. He also became the parish priest at Matinhos which has some 50 kilometres of shore. He served in this post until 1976.

In 1976 Pope Paul VI appointed Ebejer the first bishop of the Diocese of União da Vitória. On 6 March 1977 he was consecrated bishop by Archbishop Carmine Rocco, the then Apostolic Nuncio to Brazil. After 30 years as shepherd of the diocese he retired at the age of 77, in January 2007.

He died at the age of 91.
