= Columba Macbeth-Green =

Australian Roman Catholic bishop

The Most Reverend Columba Macbeth-Green
- Bishop of Wilcannia-Forbes
- Diocese: Wilcannia–Forbes
- Appointed: 12 April 2014
- Installed: 5 July 2014
- Predecessor: Christopher Henry Toohey

Orders
- Ordination: 22 November 1997
- Consecration: 3 July 2014 by Archbishop Paul Gallagher

Personal details
- Born: Columba Macbeth-Green; 30 June 1968 (age 58) Forbes, Australia
- Denomination: Roman Catholic
- Education: Vianney College
- Motto: Ne timeas tecum ego sum (Fear not, I am with you)
- Coat of arms

Styles of Columba Macbeth-Green
- Reference style: The Most Reverend
- Spoken style: My Lord
- Religious style: Bishop

Columba Macbeth-Green OSPPE (born 30 June 1968) is an Australian Roman Catholic bishop of the Pauline Fathers, who currently serves as bishop of the Roman Catholic Diocese of Wilcannia-Forbes. Until the episcopal ordination of Bishop Richard Umbers on 24 August 2016, Bishop Macbeth-Green was the youngest Catholic bishop in Australia.

== Early life ==
Macbeth-Green was born in Forbes to Paul and Lorna Green (nee Macbeth). He was raised on a sheep and wheat farm at Gunningbland, west of Forbes and Parkes. He was educated at St Laurence O’Toole Primary School and Red Bend Catholic College, both in Forbes. After leaving high school, he taught music and joined the Australian Army Reserve as a piper. He joined the Conventual Franciscans for two years. He then joined the Order of Saint Paul the First Hermit in 1990, a semi-contemplative order founded in 1215 in Hungary who observe the Rule of St. Augustine. He studied for the priesthood at Vianney College in Wagga Wagga. In 1996, he made solemn profession in the order. Despite both his parents having a strong faith, his father disowned him upon his decision to become a priest, due to the expectation he inherit and manage the family farm as the eldest son.

== Priesthood ==
Macbeth-Green was ordained as a priest in the Order of Saint Paul the First Hermit on 22 November 1997. In 1998, he was appointed to serve as administrator of Tarcutta, a small parish on the outskirts of Wagga Wagga. In 2002, he was made subprior of the shrine of Our Lady of Mercy, before becoming administrator of Moss Vale. At the time of his appointment as Bishop of Wilcannia-Forbes, he was the Pauline Fathers' provincial vicar for Australia and rector of the shrine of Mary, Help of Christians.

=== Police chaplaincy ===
From 2000 to 2014, Macbeth-Green served as a police chaplain, initially at a local level. Between 2000 and 2002, he was police chaplain for the Wagga Wagga local area command. He joined the Camden local area command in 2002 and remained with them until 2006. In 2006, he was appointed police chaplain at Police Headquarters, Brisbane. He was then appointed police chaplain for the South Eastern Region in Queensland in 2011.

== Episcopacy ==
In April 2014, Pope Francis appointed Macbeth-Green to be Bishop of Wilcannia-Forbes despite his limited experience working in chancery. He replaced Bishop Christopher Toohey who had retired in 2009, ending the five-year absence of a bishop for the diocese. He was ordained as a bishop on 3 July 2014 by Papal Nuncio Archbishop Paul Gallagher at Holy Family Church in Parkes. The ceremony was concelebrated by over 30 bishops from around Australia and several from overseas. He was installed as bishop on 5 July 2014.

== Personal life ==
Macbeth-Green regularly travels across his large diocese in his four-wheel drive and an off-road camper-trailer, accompanied by his dog Mollie, a Maltese-Shitsu. He is a fan of country music and plays the bagpipes, which he learned when he was 15. He has played in Scotland twice at the world pipe band championships. He also learned to play the violin while at high school and played the organ in the church in Forbes. He resides in Forbes and must travel 9.5 hours to his seat in the Sacred Heart Cathedral in Broken Hill.
