= Diocese of Palmas–Francisco Beltrão =

Catholic ecclesiastical territory

Diocese of Palmas–Francisco Beltrão Dioecesis Palmensis–Beltranensis Diocese de Palmas–Francisco Beltrão

Location
- Country: Brazil
- Ecclesiastical province: Cascavel
- Metropolitan: Cascavel

Statistics
- Area: 17,964 km^{2} (6,936 sq mi)
- Population: Total; Catholics: (as of 2004); 557,707; 490,787 (88.0%)

Information
- Rite: Latin Rite
- Established: 9 December 1933 (92 years ago)
- Cathedral: Cathedral of the Good Jesus in Palmas, Paraná
- Co-cathedral: Co-Cathedral of Our Lady of Glory in Francisco Beltrão

Current leadership
- Pope: Leo XIV
- Bishop: Edgar Xavier Ertl, S.A.C.
- Metropolitan Archbishop: Sede vacante

The Roman Catholic Diocese of Palmas–Francisco Beltrão (Latin: Dioecesis Palmensis–Beltranensis) is a diocese located in the cities of Palmas & Francisco Beltrão in the ecclesiastical province of Cascavel in Brazil.

== History ==
- December 9, 1933: Established as Territorial Prelature of Palmas from the Diocese of Lages and Diocese of Ponta Grossa
- January 14, 1958: Promoted as Diocese of Palmas
- January 7, 1987: Renamed as Diocese of Palmas–Francisco Beltrão

== Bishops ==
=== Ordinaries ===
Prelates of Palmas

- Bishop Carlos Eduardo de Sabóia Bandeira Melo, O.F.M. (13 December 1947 – 11 April 1958)

Bishops of Palmas

- Bishop Carlos Eduardo de Sabóia Bandeira Melo, O.F.M. (11 April 1958 – 7 February 1969)
- Bishop Agostinho José Sartori, O.F.M. Cap. (16 February 1970 – 7 January 1987)

Bishops of Palmas–Francisco Beltrão

- Bishop Agostinho José Sartori, O.F.M. Cap. (7 January 1987 – 24 August 2005)
- Bishop José Antônio Peruzzo (24 August 2005 – 7 January 2015), appointed Archbishop of Curitiba, Parana
- Bishop Edgar Xavier Ertl, S.A.C. (27 April 2016 – present)

=== Auxiliary bishop ===
- Luiz Vicente Bernetti, O.A.D. (1996-2005), appointed Bishop of Apucarana, Parana

=== Other priest of this diocese who became bishop ===
- Geremias Steinmetz, appointed Bishop of Paranavaí, Parana in 2011
