= Diocese of Wilcannia–Forbes =

Latin Catholic diocese in Australia

Diocese of Wilcannia–Forbes Dioecesis Vilcanniensis–Forbesinus
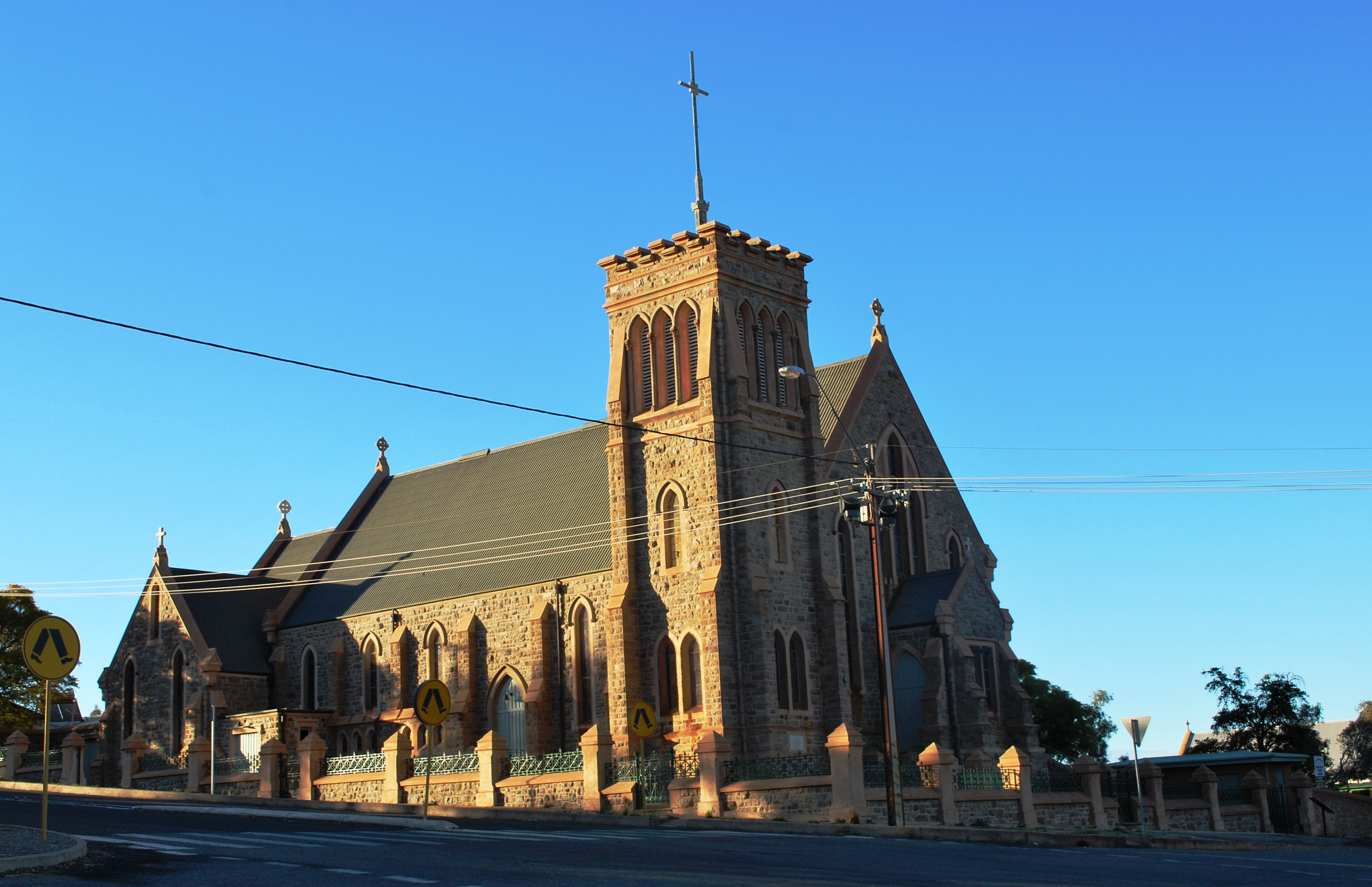
- Sacred Heart cathedral in Broken Hill; consecrated in 1960

Location
- Country: Australia
- Territory: Far West region of New South Wales
- Ecclesiastical province: Sydney
- Coordinates: 31°57′12″S 141°27′33″E

Statistics
- Area: 414,398 km^{2} (160,000 sq mi)
- Population: Total; Catholics: (as of 2004); ▼118,257; ▼35,904 (▲30.4%)
- Parishes: 20

Information
- Denomination: Catholic Church
- Sui iuris church: Latin Church
- Rite: Roman Rite
- Established: 10 May 1887 as the Diocese of Wilcannia; 28 July 1917 as the Diocese of Wilcannia–Forbes
- Cathedral: Sacred Heart, Broken Hill

Current leadership
- Pope: Leo XIV
- Bishop: Columba Macbeth-Green, OSPPE
- Metropolitan Archbishop: Anthony Fisher OP
- Vicar General: Arthur Givney
- Bishops emeritus: Christopher Henry Toohey

Map

Website
- wf.catholic.org.au

The Diocese of Wilcannia–Forbes is a Latin Church ecclesiastical jurisdiction or diocese of the Catholic Church in Australia. It is a suffragan in the ecclesiastical province of the metropolitan Archdiocese of Sydney. The Diocese of Wilcannia–Forbes was established in 1887, initially as the Diocese of Wilcannia (this town on the Darling River was then important due to the dominance of river transport). The diocese adopted its current name in 1917 when six parochial districts of Diocese of Bathurst, including those of Parkes and Forbes, were added to its western neighbour. The diocese covers the Far West region of New South Wales in Australia. The Bishop's office is in Forbes but his seat is in Sacred Heart Cathedral, Broken Hill.

== History ==
In 1887, the Diocese of Wilcannia was erected by Pope Leo XIII, on territories taken from the three now-neighbouring dioceses: Armidale, Bathurst (see below) and Goulburn (later absorbed in the present Canberra-Goulburn Archdiocese), making it one of the oldest dioceses in Australia.

In 1917, the area of the diocese was enlarged (at the expense of the neighbouring Diocese of Bathurst) and its name changed to the Diocese of Wilcannia–Forbes to take account of the added parishes.

On 6 September 1950, Pope Pius XII accepted a request from Thomas Martin Fox, who was Bishop of Wilcannia-Forbes at the time, to declare the Blessed Virgin Mary, under the title of Our Lady of Perpetual Help, as Patroness of the Diocese.

On 9 June 2009, Pope Benedict XVI accepted the resignation of Bishop Christopher Toohey due to reasons of personal health. In April 2011, Bishop Toohey released a personal statement admitting that his behaviour during the early years of his ministry with young adults in his pastoral care was "not consistent with that required of a good person". Although the specific behaviours were not mentioned, the church stated that any acts were not criminal in nature. To date, Bishop Toohey is the most senior member of the Church to admit to inappropriate behaviour with young adults. The Pope appointed Sydney auxiliary bishop Terence Brady as apostolic administrator from 2009 until 2011. In 2011 the Bishop Emeritus of Parramatta, Kevin Michael Manning, was appointed to succeed Brady.

== Bishops ==
=== Ordinaries ===
The following men have been Bishop of Wilcannia:

Order	Name	Date installed	Term ended	Term of office	Reason for term end
1	John Dunne	13 May 1887	25 December 1916	29 years, 226 days	Died in office

The following individuals have been elected as Bishop of Wilcannia–Forbes:

Order	Name	Date installed	Term ended	Term of office	Reason for term end
1	William Hayden	13 March 1918	11 February 1930	11 years, 335 days	Elevated as Archbishop of Hobart
2	Thomas Martin Fox	9 June 1931	10 July 1967	36 years, 31 days	Died in office
3	Douglas Joseph Warren	26 September 1967	30 March 1994	26 years, 185 days	Retired
4	Barry Francis Collins	30 March 1994	15 November 2000	6 years, 230 days	Died in office
5	Christopher Henry Toohey	9 July 2001	9 June 2009	7 years, 335 days	Resigned
6	Columba Macbeth-Green, OSPPE	12 April 2014	present	12 years, 110 days	Currently bishop

In absence of an appointed Bishop, the following bishops have been appointed as Apostolic Administrator of Wilcannia–Forbes:

- Terence John Gerard Brady – Apostolic Administrator (9 June 2009 – 30 Dec 2011)
- Kevin Michael Manning – Apostolic Administrator (30 December 2011 – 1 December 2012)
- Michael Robert Kennedy – Apostolic Administrator (01 Dec 2012 – 6 July 2014)

=== Auxiliary bishop ===
- Douglas Joseph Warren (1964–1967), appointed Bishop here

=== Other priests of this diocese who became bishops ===
- Andrew Killian, appointed Bishop of Port Augusta in 1924
- William Joseph Brennan, appointed Bishop of Toowoomba in 1953
- William John Brennan, appointed Bishop of Wagga Wagga in 1984

== Cathedral ==
Sacred Heart Cathedral, Broken Hill has been the cathedral of the diocese since 1905, though the bishops of Wilcannia had their residence in Broken Hill since 1889. The cathedral parish has some 5,500 parishioners, most of whom live in Broken Hill.

== Parishes ==
Churches are located in the following parishes and locations (dedicated to saints as indicated):

Image	Location	Coordinates	Name	Built
	Balranald	34°38′16″S 143°33′52″E	St Dymphna	
	Barham		Sacred Heart	
	Bogan Gate		All Saints	
	Booligal		St Michael	
	Bourke		Holy Spirit and St Ignatius	
	Brewarrina		St Patrick	
	Broken Hill		Sacred Heart Cathedral	1905
	Buronga		St Micheal	
	Cobar		St Laurence O'Toole	
	Condobolin	33°5′3″S 147°8′46″E	St Joseph	
	Dareton		St Maria Goretti	
	Deniliquin		St Michael	
	Fifield		St Dymphna	
	Forbes	32°22′48″S 148°0′29″E	St Laurence O'Toole	
	Goolgowi		St John Vianney	
	Hay		St Fergal	
	Hillston		Our Lady of Good Counsel	
	Ivanhoe		St Laurence O'Toole	
	Mathoura		St Brigid	
	Menindee		St Patrick	
	Moama		St Aloysius	
	Moulamein		St Mary	
Narromine Roman Catholic Church 001	Narromine		Blessed Sacrament and St Augustine	
Nevertire Roman Catholic Church 001	Nevertire		St Brigid	
	North Broken Hill		Ss Peter and Paul	
	Nymagee		St Mary	
St Patrick's Roman Catholic church, Nyngan, 2017 (01)	Nyngan	31°33′48″S 147°11′29″E	St Patrick	
	Parkes	33°08′17″S 148°10′35″E	Holy Family	
	Peak Hill		St James	
	Tooleybuc	35°1′43″S 143°20′23″E	St Mary	
	Tottenham		St Anthony	
	Trangie		St Carthage	
	Trundle		St Michael	
	Tullamore		St Mary	
	Wakool		St Joseph	
Warren Roman Catholic Church 002	Warren		St Mary	
	Wentworth		St Francis Xavier	
	Wilcannia		St John	
	Womboota		St Paul	

== Boundaries ==
With 414,398 square kilometres (160,000 sq mi) in its territory, the Diocese of Wilcannia–Forbes is the largest diocese in New South Wales. More than half of the State is part of its territory. The Diocese comprises the territory in New South Wales west of a line from the Murray River 16 kilometres (9.9 mi) west of Tocumwal, to the Murrumbidgee River near Darlington Point, to the Lachlan River 32 kilometres (20 mi) down from Euabalong but excluding the Murrumbidgee Irrigation Area; thence to the eastern boundary by the Lachlan River including the whole of the Forbes Shire. The eastern boundary is the Eurow-Nyrang Mountains, the Harvey Range, a line from the junction of the Brummagen Creek and the Macquarie River to a point on the Macquarie River 16 kilometres (9.9 mi) north of Warren, thence north in a straight line crossing the Barwon River, 16 kilometres (9.9 mi) west of Walgett, to the Queensland border, including Carinda, Lightning Ridge and Goodooga. The boundaries were enlarged in 1917 to include six new parochial areas taken from Bathurst Diocese, including the parishes of Forbes and Parkes.

== Schools ==
- Balranald (St Joseph's Primary School)
- Bourke (St Ignatius Primary School)
- Brewarrina (St Patrick's Primary School)
- Broken Hill (Sacred Heart Parish Primary School)
- Cobar (St John's Primary School)
- Condobolin (St Joseph's Primary School)
- Deniliquin (St Michael's Parish School)
- Forbes (St Laurence's Primary School and Red Bend Catholic College
- Hay (St Mary's Primary School)
- Hillston (St Joseph's Primary School)
- Narromine (St Augustine's Primary School)
- Nyngan (St Joseph's Primary School)
- Parkes (Holy Family Primary School)
- Peak Hill (St Joseph's Primary School)
- Trangie (St John's Primary School)
- Trundle (St Patrick's Primary School)
- Warren (St Mary's Primary School)
- Wilcannia (St Therese's Community School)

== See also ==
- Catholic Church in Australia
