= Archdiocese of Curitiba =

Catholic ecclesiastical territory

Coordinates: 25°28′07″S 49°15′20″W

Archdiocese of Curitiba Archidioecesis Curitibensis Arquidiocese de Curitiba
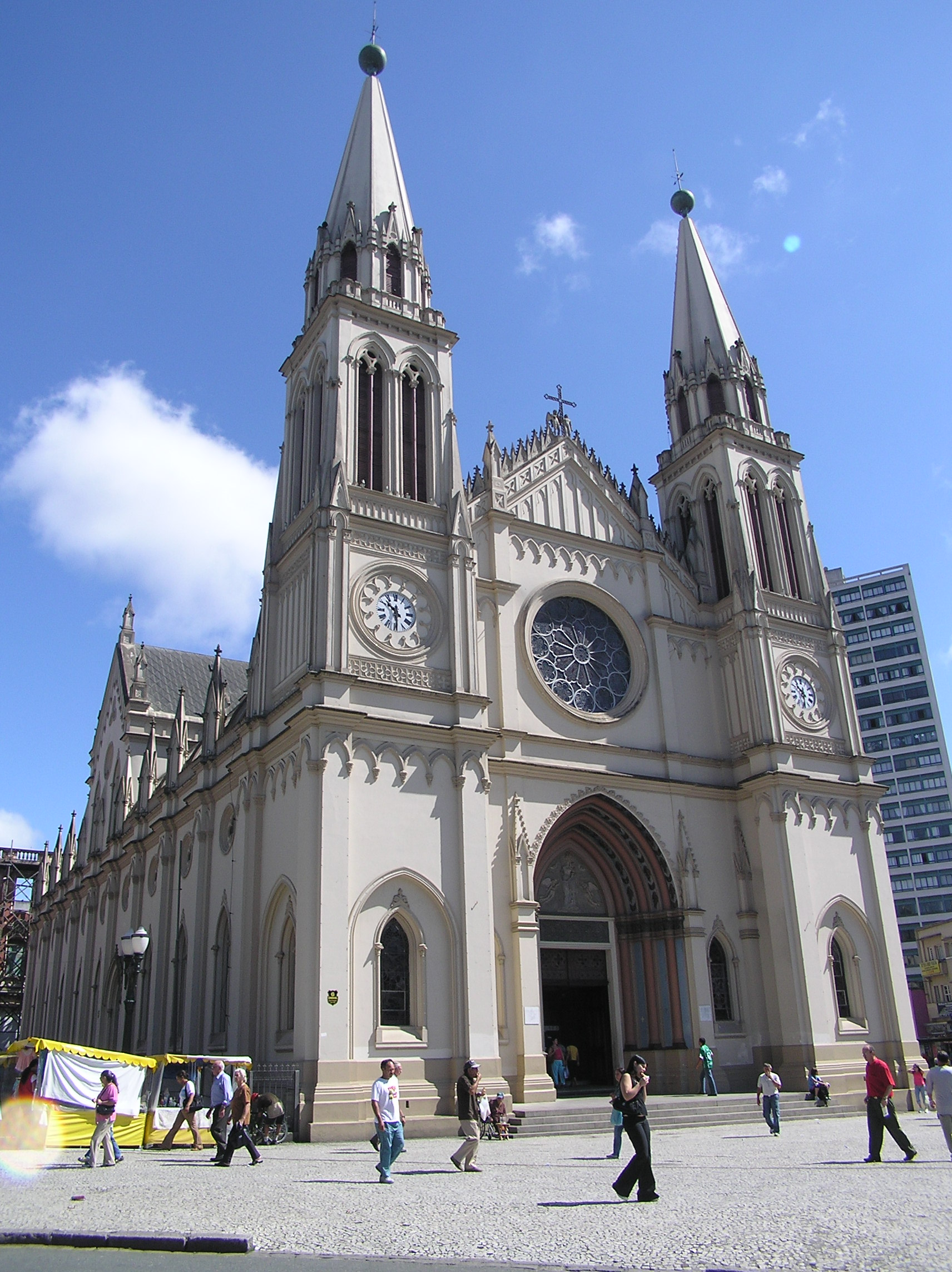
- Metropolitan Cathedral Basilica of Our Lady of Light of Pinhais

- Coat of arms

Location
- Country: Brazil
- Ecclesiastical province: Curitiba

Statistics
- Area: 5,528 km^{2} (2,134 sq mi)
- Population: Total; Catholics: (as of 2006); 2,262,347; 1,480,046 (65.4%)

Information
- Rite: Latin Rite
- Established: 27 April 1892 (134 years ago)
- Cathedral: Cathedral Basilica of Our Lady of Light in Curitiba

Current leadership
- Pope: Leo XIV
- Metropolitan Archbishop: José Antônio Peruzzo

Website
- Official website

There is also a Diocese of Curitiba (and a Bishop of Curitiba) in the Anglican Episcopal Church of Brazil.

The Roman Catholic Archdiocese of Curitiba (Latin: Archidioecesis Curitibensis) is a Latin Rite Metropolitan archdiocese in Paraná, southern Brazil.

Its cathedral archiepiscopal see is a Minor Basilica: Catedral Metropolitana Basílica Nossa Senhora da Luz dos Pinhais, dedicated to Our Lady of the Candles, in Curitiba.

== History ==
- April 27, 1892: Established as Diocese of Curitiba / Curitiben(sis) (Latin), on territory split off from the then Diocese of São Paulo (now Metropolitan)
- Lost territory on 1908.03.19 to establish the Diocese of Santa Catarina
- Promoted on May 10, 1926, as Metropolitan Archdiocese of Curitiba / Curitiben(sis) (Latin), having lost territories to establish Territorial Prelature of Foz do Iguaçu, Diocese of Jacarezinho and Diocese of Ponta Grossa (as a suffragan)
- Lost territories repeatedly to establish three more suffragan sees : on 1962.07.21 Diocese of Paranaguá, on 1976.12.03 Diocese of União da Vitória and on 2006.12.06 Diocese of São José dos Pinhais
- It enjoyed a Papal visit from Pope John Paul II in July 1980.

== Statistics ==
As per 2014, it pastorally served 1,835,000 Catholics (71.6% of 2,562,464 total) on 5,751 km^{2} in 135 parishes and 572 missions with 407 priests (100 diocesan, 307 religious), 70 deacons, 1,527 lay religious (614 brothers, 913 sisters) and 33 seminarians.

== Ecclesiastical province ==
The Metropolitan has the following suffragan sees :

- Roman Catholic Diocese of Guarapuava
- Roman Catholic Diocese of Paranaguá, a daughter
- Roman Catholic Diocese of Ponta Grossa, a daughter
- Roman Catholic Diocese of São José dos Pinhais, a daughter
- Roman Catholic Diocese of União da Vitória, a daughter

== Episcopal ordinaries, along with auxiliary bishops ==
(all Roman rite)

Under each Ordinary is listed the auxiliary bishops whose tenure as such began during the tenure of such Ordinary.

Suffragan Bishops of Curitiba

- José de Camargo Barros (1894.01.16 – 1903.11.09), next Bishop of São Paulo (Brazil) (1903.11.09 – death 1906.08.04)
- Leopoldo Duarte e Silva, (1904.05.10 – 1906.12.18), next last Suffragan Bishop of (his native) São Paulo, (see) promoted first Metropolitan Archbishop of São Paulo (Brazil) (1908.06.07 – death 1938.11.13)
- João Francisco Braga (later Archbishop) (1907.10.27 – 1926.05.10 see below), previously Bishop of Niterói (Brazil) (1902.04.09 – 1907.10.27)

Metropolitan Archbishops of Curitiba

- João Francisco Braga (see above 1926.05.10 – 1935.06.22), emeritate as Titular Archbishop of Soteropolis (1935.06.22 – death 1937.10.13)
- Ático Eusébio da Rocha (1935.12.16 – death 1950.04.11), previously Bishop of Santa Maria(Brazil) (1922.10.27 – 1928.12.17), Bishop of Cafelândia (Brazil) (1928.12.17 – 1935.12.16)

BIOs TO ELABORATE

- Manoel da Silveira d’Elboux (1950.08.19 – 1970.02.06)
  - Auxiliary Bishop: Inácio Krause (葛樂才), C.M. (1950 – 1963)
  - Auxiliary Bishop: Gabriel Paulino Bueno Couto, O. Carm. (1954 – 1955), appointed Auxiliary Bishop of Taubaté, São Paulo
  - Auxiliary Bishop: Jerônimo Mazzarotto (1957.04.29 – 1970.05.08)
  - Auxiliary Bishop: Pedro Antônio Marchetti Fedalto (1966.05.30 – 1970.12.28), appointed Archbishop here
- Pedro Antônio Marchetti Fedalto (1970.12.28 – 2004.05.19)
  - Auxiliary Bishop: Albano Bortoletto Cavallin (later Archbishop) (1973.06.14 – 1986.10.24), appointed Bishop of Guarapuava, Parana
  - Auxiliary Bishop: Domingos Gabriel Wisniewski, C.M. (1975.06.27 – 1979.04.19), appointed Bishop of Cornélio Procópio, Parana
  - Auxiliary Bishop: Ladislau Biernaski, C.M. (1979.04.19 – 2006.12.06), appointed Bishop of São José dos Pinhais, Parana
  - Auxiliary Bishop: Sérgio Arthur Braschi (1998.02.18 – 2003.07.16), appointed Bishop of Ponta Grossa, Parana
- Moacyr José Vitti, Stigmatines (C.S.S.) (2004.05.19 – 2014.06.26)
  - Auxiliary Bishop: Dirceu Vegini (2006.03.15 – 2010.10.20), appointed Bishop of Foz do Iguaçu, Parana
  - Auxiliary Bishop: João Carlos Seneme, C.S.S. (2007.10.17 – 2013.06.26), appointed Bishop of Toledo, Parana
  - Auxiliary Bishop: Rafael Biernaski (2010.02.10 – 2015.06.24), appointed Bishop of Blumenau, Santa Catarina
  - Auxiliary Bishop: José Mário Scalon Angonese (2013.02.20 – 2017.05.31), appointed Bishop of Uruguaiana, Rio Grande do Sul
- José Antônio Peruzzo (2015.01.07 – ...), previously Bishop of Palmas–Francisco Beltrão (Brazil) (2005.08.24 – 2015.01.07)
  - Auxiliary Bishop : Francisco Cota de Oliveira (2017.06.07 – 2020.06.10), Titular Bishop of Fiorentino (2017.06.07 – 2020.06.10), appointed Bishop of Sete Lagoas, Minas Gerais
  - Auxiliary Bishop: Amilton Manoel da Silva, C.P. (2017.06.07 – 2020.05.06), Titular Bishop of Tusuros (2017.06.07 – 2020.05.06), appointed Bishop of Guarapuava

== See also ==
- List of Catholic dioceses in Brazil

== Sources and external links ==
- GCatholic.org, with Google map & satellite photo - data for all sections
- Archdiocese website (Portuguese)
- Catholic Hierarchy
