= José Antônio Peruzzo =

Brazilian Catholic archbishop

The Most Reverend José Antônio Peruzzo
- Archbishop of Curitiba
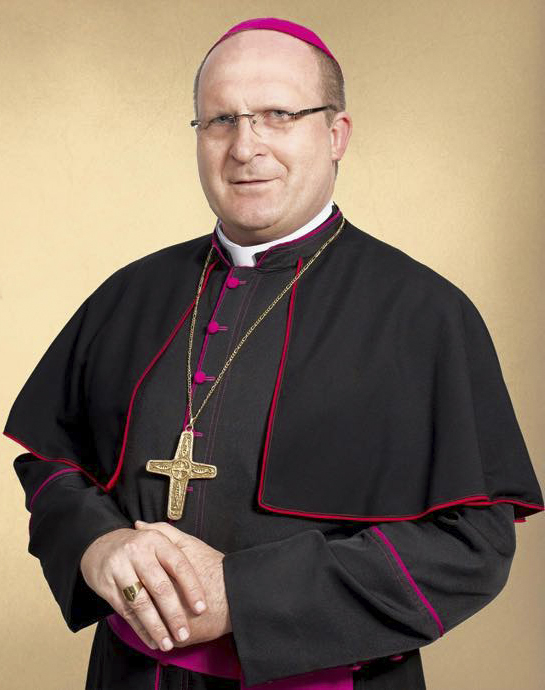
- Peruzzo in 2015.
- Church: Roman Catholic Church
- Archdiocese: Curitiba
- See: Curitiba
- Appointed: 7 January 2015
- Installed: 19 March 2015
- Predecessor: Moacyr José Vitti
- Previous post: Bishop of Palmas-Francisco Beltrão (2005-15)

Orders
- Ordination: 22 December 1985
- Consecration: 23 November 2005 by Armando Círio

Personal details
- Born: José Antônio Peruzzo; 19 April 1960 (age 66) Cascavel, Paraná, Brazil
- Education: Pontifical Catholic University of Paraná; Pontifical Biblical Institute; Pontifical University of Saint Thomas Aquinas
- Motto: Facite discipulos docete
- Coat of arms

José Antônio Peruzzo (born 19 April 1960) is a Brazilian prelate of the Catholic Church who has been Archbishop of Curitiba since January 2015. He was Bishop of Palmas–Francisco Beltrão from 2005 to 2015.

== Biography ==
José Antônio Peruzzo was born on 19 April 1960 in Cascavel, Paraná, Brazil. He attended the Marist College and the São José Minor Seminary in Curitiba. He completed his philosophical studies at the Pontifical Catholic University of Paraná (1979-1981) and the theological studies in the Studium Theologicum (1982-1985). He continued his studies in Rome, obtaining a licenciate in sacred scripture at the Pontifical Biblical Institute in Rome (1988-1992) and a doctorate in biblical theology at the Pontifical University of St. Thomas Aquinas (2002-2004). On 22 December 1985, he was ordained a priest of the Diocese of Cascavel.

His pastoral work included serving as coordinator of religious instruction for the diocese. He became pastor of the diocesan cathedral parish and served on two diocesan bodies, the college of consultors and the priests council. His academic career included terms as Professor at the Diocesan Center of Theology and Rector of the Theological Seminary of Cascavel.

On 24 August 2005, Pope Benedict XVI appointed him Bishop of Palmas-Francisco Beltrão. He received his episcopal consecration on 23 November from Archbishop Armando Círio, OSI.

Pope Francis appointed him archbishop of Curitiba on 7 January 2015. He was installed there on 19 March.

He heads the committee for Biblical-Religious Engagement of the Episcopal Conference of Brazil.
