= Thomas William Murphy =

Thomas William Murphy may refer to:

- Thomas W. Murphy (American Samoa judge) (1935–1992)
- Tom Murphy (English footballer) (born 1991), English footballer
- Tomás Guilherme Murphy (1716–1995), American-born Catholic bishop
- Torpedo Billy Murphy (1863–1939), New Zealand boxer
