= José Geraldo da Cruz =

Brazilian Roman Catholic prelate (1941–2022)

The Most Reverend José Geraldo da Cruz A.A.
- Bishop of Juazeiro
- Diocese: Juazeiro
- Appointed: 4 June 2003
- Term ended: 7 September 2016
- Predecessor: José Rodrigues de Souza
- Successor: Carlos Alberto Breis Pereira

Orders
- Ordination: 1 May 1969
- Consecration: 16 August 2003 by Luciano Mendes de Almeida

Personal details
- Born: 8 August 1941 Muriaé, Minas Gerais, Brazil
- Died: 4 April 2022 (aged 80) Muriaé, Minas Gerais, Brazil
- Motto: ADVENIAT REGNUM TUUM

José Geraldo da Cruz A.A. (8 August 1941 – 4 April 2022) was a Brazilian Roman Catholic prelate.

Da Cruz was born in Brazil and was ordained to the priesthood in 1969. He served as bishop of the Roman Catholic Diocese of Juazeiro, Brazil, from 2003 until his retirement in 2016.

Catholic Church titles
Preceded by José Rodrigues de Souza	Bishop of Juazeiro; 2003–2016	Succeeded by Carlos Alberto Breis Pereira
