= Diocese of Palmeira dos Índios =

Catholic ecclesiastical territory

Diocese of Palmeira dos Índios Dioecesis Palmiriensis Indorum

Catholic

Location
- Country: Brazil
- Ecclesiastical province: Maceió

Statistics
- Area: 10,858 km^{2} (4,192 sq mi)
- Population: Total; Catholics: (as of 2023); 639,000; 603,000 (94.4%)
- Parishes: 36

Information
- Denomination: Catholic Church
- Sui iuris church: Latin Church
- Rite: Roman Rite
- Established: 10 February 1962; 64 years ago
- Cathedral: Catedral Nossa Senhora do Amparo
- Secular priests: 56 (54 Diocesan, 2 Religious Orders)

Current leadership
- Pope: Leo XIV
- Bishop: Manoel de Oliveira Soares Filho

The Roman Catholic Diocese of Palmeira dos Índios (Latin: Dioecesis Palmiriensis Indorum) is a diocese located in the city of Palmeira dos Índios in the ecclesiastical province of Maceió in Brazil.

== History ==
- 10 February 1962: Established as Diocese of Palmeira dos Índios from the Metropolitan Archdiocese of Maceió and Diocese of Penedo

== Bishops ==
Bishops of Palmeira dos Índios (Roman rite), in reverse chronological order

- Bishop Manoel de Oliveira Soares Filho (2018.12.19 – 2026.03.24), appointed Bishop of Castanhal, Pará
  - Apostolic Administrator Genival Saraiva de França (2018.10.26 – 2019.03.10), Bishop Emeritus of Palmares, Pernambuco
- Bishop Dulcênio Fontes de Matos (2006.07.12 – 2017.10.11), appointed Bishop of Campina Grande, Paraíba
- Bishop Fernando Iório Rodrigues (1985.03.01 – 2006.07.12), retired
- Bishop Epaminondas José de Araújo (1978.06.05 – 1984.11.28), resigned
- Bishop Otávio Barbosa Aguiar (1962.07.04 – 1978.03.29), resigned

=== Other priests of this diocese who became bishops ===
- Hélio Pereira dos Santos (1996-2016), appointed Auxiliary Bishop of São Salvador da Bahia
- José Francisco Falcão de Barros (1991-2011), appointed Auxiliary Bishop of the Military Ordinariate of Brazil
- Jorge Tobias de Freitas (1965-1981), appointed Bishop of Caxias do Maranhão
