= Valério Breda =

Italian priest (1945–2020)

Valério Breda S.D.B.
- Bishop of Penedo
- Church: Catholic Church
- Diocese: Diocese of Penedo
- In office: 30 July 1997 – 16 June 2020
- Predecessor: Constantino José Lüers
- Successor: Valdemir Ferreira dos Santos

Orders
- Ordination: 29 June 1973
- Consecration: 19 October 1997 by Lucas Moreira Neves

Personal details
- Born: 24 January 1945 San Fior di Sotto, Province of Treviso, Italian Social Republic
- Died: 16 June 2020 (aged 75) Maceió, Alagoas, Brazil

Valério Breda (24 January 1945 – 16 June 2020) was an Italian-born Brazilian Roman Catholic bishop.

Breda was born in Italy and was ordained to the priesthood in 1973. He served as bishop of the Roman Catholic Diocese of Penedo, Brazil, from 1997 until his death in 2020.
