= Ike Weir =

Irish featherweight boxer

Personal information
- Nickname: The Belfast Spider
- Nationality: British (Note: Ireland was part of the United Kingdom until 1922.)
- Born: Isaac O'Neil Weir; January 17, 1867 Lurgan, Ireland, U.K.
- Died: September 24, 1908 (aged 41) Charlestown, Massachusetts, U.S.
- Height: 5 ft 5.5 in (1.66 m)
- Weight: Featherweight

Boxing career
- Stance: Orthodox

Boxing record
- Total fights: 40
- Wins: 28
- Win by KO: 19
- Losses: 3
- Draws: 9

Ike Weir (February 5, 1867 – September 12, 1908) was an Irish boxer, credited with being the first man to be featherweight champion of the world. He took the title after defeating Frank Murphy on March 31, 1889, in Kouts, Indiana in a fight that went an astounding eighty rounds, though it was officially declared a draw. Some sources may credit Weir with taking the world title as early as 1887 in his knockout title wins over Jack Farrell in Ridgefield, New Jersey on January 24, or Jack Williams in Westerly, Rhode Island, on March 10. Weir first claimed the title in his win over Farrell.

He was recognized by most sources to have lost the title on January 13, 1890, to Torpedo Billy Murphy in a fourteenth-round knockout in San Francisco, California.

== Early life and career ==
Weir was born on February 5, 1867, in Lurgan, Ireland (nowadays Northern Ireland). He grew up near Belfast, where his father worked as a breeder, buyer, and trainer of thoroughbred horses for the gentry. Weir was somewhat dark complected with curly hair, blue eyes, and a lean build. He was well educated and had a fondness for books, and music. His shooting skills with both gun and pistol were noteworthy, and he was a fine pianist, having taken music education at an early age. Lighthearted and a serious entertainer, he was known to dance a jig, or to perform a handstand or backflip in the ring for the entertainment of his fans. Beginning work as a cross country jockey in Preston, England before taking up boxing, he had a fondness for horses from an early age. His ring name "spider" may have had an origin in his thin arms and legs, or a result of the spider-like riding crouch he assumed as a jockey.

=== Early career boxing in England ===
On October 5, 1885, he entered an amateur boxing contest in Manchester, where he defeated Stewart of Bradford, and Bill Palon, before being beaten by Joe Fielden who was thirty pounds heavier than Weir. His official boxing debut was on October 9, 1885, against W. Harlow in Salford. His first serious boxing instruction was obtained in Liverpool. There he defeated Billy Sykes in four rounds on points using English boxing rules. In the next two years, before his first bout with Tommy Warren, he won ten of fourteen fights, with only four being considered draws.

=== 1886 arrival in Boston ===
Having difficulty finding bouts in England, he arrived in Boston on March 10, 1886, at the age of nineteen, and won a three-round contest with Willie Snee. He would remain in the U.S. the rest of his life. In his next American battle in Boston on October 29, 1886, he put James Furman on the canvas in a surprising fifth-round technical knockout which allowed him to be matched with better known boxer Martin Burns on November 5 of the following week. He knocked out Burns in six difficult rounds in Boston.

== Mid professional boxing career ==
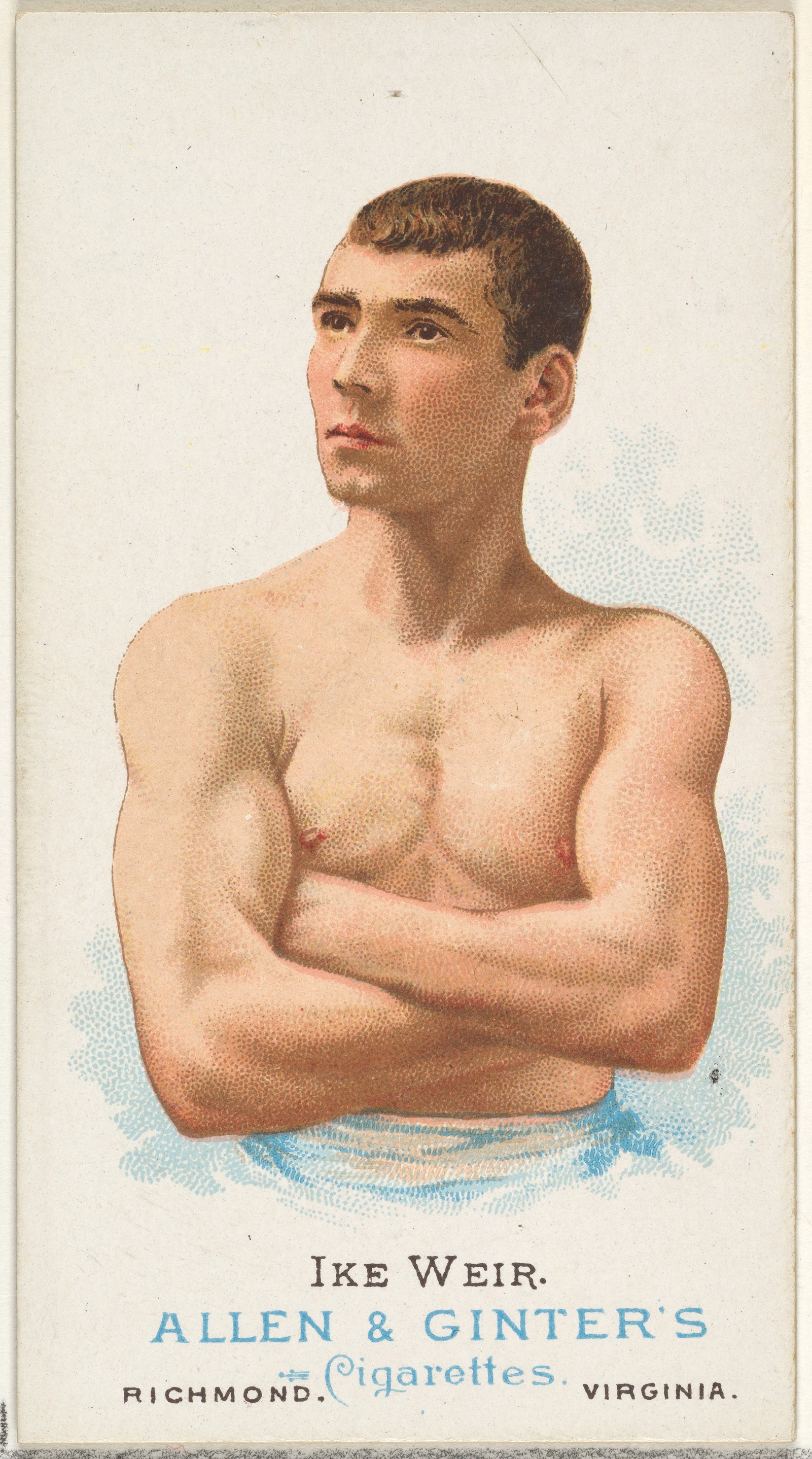
Ike Weir 1887 cigarette card

Weir was known for his clever ducking and rapid countering, rather than a strong punch. He defeated a number of middleweights in his career, some outweighing him by as much as fifty pounds.

=== Early featherweight title matches ===
On March 10, 1887, Weir fought a thirty-six-round match against Jack Williams in Westerly, Rhode Island, that ended in a knockout for Weir. The fight was billed as a World Featherweight Title match. In the close and exciting contest, Weir was down in the twelfth, twenty-fourth, and twenty-ninth rounds, while Williams was down in the thirty-sixth round.

On January 24, 1887, Weir won a seventh-round knockout against Jack Farrell in Ridgefield, New Jersey, near Hoboken, that was billed as a World 124 pound title match, though it was not subsequently recognized as such. Weir received around $500 for the bout which was likely the largest purse he had yet received, and as the actual fight time was only eighteen minutes, it was a welcomed windfall for Weir. According to one source, the match was held in a somewhat private venue to keep its existence from the attention of the authorities who may have had issue with its legality. Weir took a few good shots in the bout himself and subsequently had a bad cut over his right eye. He later described Farrell as the "gamest man he ever met".

On Easter Monday, April 11, 1887, he married Henrietta Flora McAvoy, at St. Mary's in Boston's North end; he remained with her throughout his life.

On April 30, 1887, Weir defeated Willie Clarke in a twenty-round bout lasting 1 hour 23 minutes in Long Island Sound in Queens, New York. Weir knocked Clarke down twice in the first and once in the seventh. The bout was brutal, with far more of the injuries attributed to Clarke. Injuries to Weir's hands made it unlikely he could win by knockout, extending the length of the bout. Clarke attempted a futile rally in the nineteenth round, but was too weak and injured. His seconds threw in the sponge at the end of the twentieth when he could no longer see. According to one source, several of his earliest bouts had as few as twenty in attendance due to the legal issues associated with boxing at the time, and a single ticket could get a price as high as $100.

=== All-night bout with Jack Havlin ===
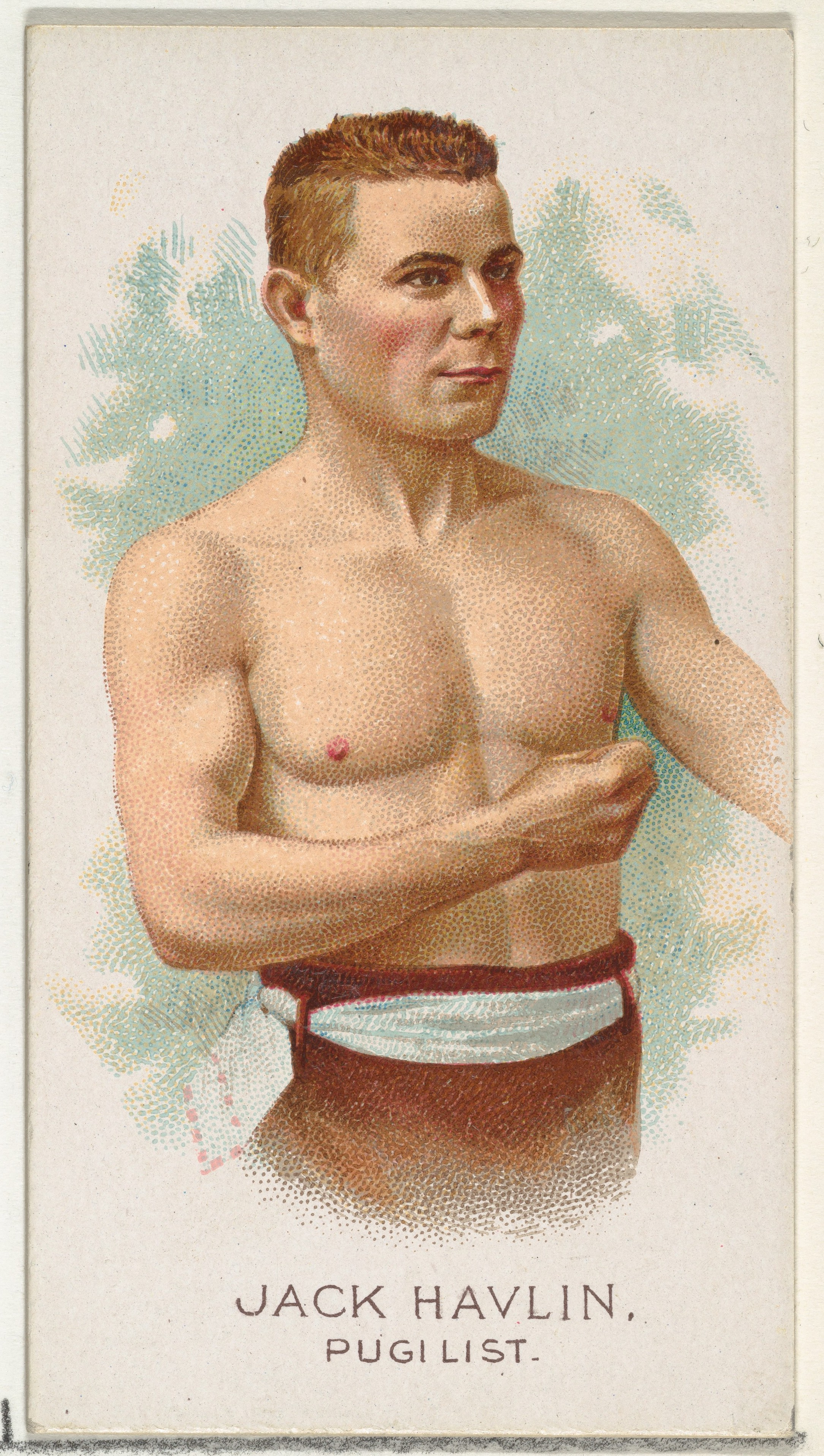
Jack Havlin, 1888

On July 20, 1887, Weir fought an unusually long 61-round match outdoors against Jack Havlin of Providence, in Pawtucket, Rhode Island. The fight, described as "one of the hardest battles Weir ever took part in", began around 9:30 PM, and lasted much of the night before ending around 3:00 AM in an official draw. Weir's manager at the time was Ed Holske, who had followed him from his fighting days in England. The battle caused injuries to Weir's hands, which were a source of concern for much of his boxing career. Further increasing the chances of hand injuries, the bout was fought with skin-tight gloves which offered little padding. According to one source, Havlin was more badly injured from the bout, suffering from serious swelling and injuries to his eyes, and most sources agree Havlin had the worst of the contest. With Havlin unable to see effectively for the later part of the match, and Weir having serious problems with his hands, not much contact took place. The bout ended when the referee called the match.

On September 30, 1887, he met Johnny Murphy in Boston in a 17-round draw, which may have originally only been scheduled for 15. The referee considered the fighting so close that two additional rounds were added, but failed to help determine a victor.

== Title bout with Tommy Warren ==
On December 12, 1887, Weir fought a 20-round featherweight title match against Tommy Warren at boxer John Barnes's club in Minneapolis, Minnesota, with Barnes himself as the referee. A few sources credited his ascension to the American and world featherweight crown with his victory in this match. Describing the fight, one source wrote, "The "Belfast Spider" outfought the "Boy Gambler" of Louisville (Warren) at every stage of the game and Warren was in a bad way when Barnes (referee) stopped the affair in the twentieth round and called it a draw." According to the El Paso Herald, Weir's bout with Warren was "the first ever pulled off under the Marquis of Queensbury Rules with the World's Featherweight Championship at stake", though more sources credit Weir's ascension to the featherweight crown against Murphy on March 31, 1889. According to one source, Warren was given two ounce gloves for the bout, while Weir was required to wear larger ones. By the 1910s gloves were closer to four ounces in weight. With far greater speed and mobility Weir was said to have "danced all around Warren".

On January 23, 1888, in the height of winter he fought Tommy Miller in Minneapolis at the Washington Roller Rink. He defeated Miller in a seventh-round knockout. Legend has it that Weir did a somersault followed by a handstand so his seconds could remove his warm-up pants. He did a second hand stand when asked to shake the hand of Miller, brushing his foot on Miller's chin. The crowd, who favored Miller, was not amused.

Shortly after this bout, Weir fought "Ironman" George Siddons on February 3, 1888, in Duluth, Minnesota, winning by technical knockout in the eleventh of 15 rounds, though Siddons claimed he had been fouled. According to one source, Siddon's jaw had been broken in the bout, which could be a brutal affair with the thin gloves that were used.

== World featherweight title ==
Frank Murphy

Weir, by most accounts, first took the World Featherweight Championship in a match with Frank Murphy on March 31, 1889, in Kouts, Indiana. The fight was billed as a world featherweight title, and went an astonishing eighty rounds. It decided the World Featherweight Championship, according to several sources, though it was ruled a draw by the referee. With both combatants exhausted, little fighting took place in the last eighteen rounds. Upon examination, Murphy was found to have had a broken rib, and Weir had possibly received a minor jaw fracture. By most accounts, Weir was the more aggressive boxer in the bout.

== Loss of world featherweight title to Billy Murphy ==
Torpedo Billy Murphy

Weir lost the world featherweight title on January 13, 1890, to Torpedo Billy Murphy in a fourteenth-round knockout at the California Athletic Club in San Francisco, California. The purse for the fight was $2,250. Weir dominated throughout the fight, but was said to have failed to follow up on his advantages, when, for no apparent reason, Weir collapsed to the ground in the thirteenth round. Weir had not been hit hard, and some thought it may have been part of his clowning. However, while Weir rose in time, he soon went back down again. Weir went down 6 times, and while he made it to the end of the round. Weir's legs were shaking at the start of the fourteenth round, but he was reported to have avoided Murphy's hits, until going down from another light hit, this time until he was counted out. In a rematch, on November 2, 1893, he beat Murphy in a six-round knockout, which was one of the high points of his late career. In the fourth round, he knocked Murphy entirely out of the ring. Weir successfully used his clever ducking and bobbing as a defense in the fight, avoiding Murphy's powerful right which had plagued him in their earlier title bout.

On July 7, 1890, he knocked out James Connor in Buffalo, New York in three rounds for a purse of $2,000, taking $1,750 for himself.

On January 17, 1891, he returned to Australia and defeated Abe Willis in a four-round newspaper decision in Sydney. By February 21, he had returned to San Francisco via Hawaii, claiming he was homesick for America and having trouble getting immediate fights.

After his victory over boxer "Kentucky Rosebud" in early 1891, Weir returned for a time to cross country horse racing, participating in several events in New England, and becoming known as a jockey in Boston. He took around seven months off from boxing during the period. Famed Irish heavyweight boxing champion John L. Sullivan was a close friend. On May 30, 1892, at Sunnyside Park in Nantucket, Massachusetts, he rode Dictum to three first-place finishes in three heats, one of his greatest feats as a jockey.

Returning to boxing with a strong win on February 18, 1892, he fought Frank Steele at the New Bedford Athletic Club in New Bedford, Massachusetts, knocking him out in the twelfth round. Weir danced the Highland Fling and Irish jig during the match, which annoyed his opponent but greatly pleased the crowd. According to one source, "The fight was fiercely fought for twelve rounds, when Ike had punished his opponent so badly that he went to sleep for thirty-two seconds, and the "Spider" won. It was a clean knockout." The total purse was set at $600 to be divided between the contestants.

On April 19, 1893, he fought a hard ten round draw against Tommy White at the Hennepin Athletic Club in Minneapolis, Minnesota. The winner would have received $500, the loser $100. At the end of ten rounds, unlike in many of Weir's longer fights, both fighters were fresh and uninjured, and the referee declared a draw.

== Late career, retirement ==
On March 17, 1894, Weir was outclassed in a bout with Arthur Griffiths, known as "Young Griffo," at the Second Regiment Armory in Chicago. The Australian lightweight dominated the bout, which was stopped by the police in the third round when Weir was down. Weir announced retirement after the bout but returned to the ring for a few more professional bouts and exhibitions. Although the bout was officially called a draw by the referee, Griffo knocked Weir down twice in the third round, with Weir taking a while to get to his feet. Many in the crowd were displeased with the official Draw decision. According to the Inter Ocean, as many as five thousand were in attendance to watch "three of the fastest, fiercest and most brutal rounds ever fought in an American prize ring". One reporter noted that Young Griffo made a "veritable chopping block of Ike O'Neil Weir, the "Belfast Spider"". According to one source, Griffo may have outweighed Wier by as much as thirty pounds during the bout, though discrepancies in the weights of opponents was more common in this era of boxing.

His tenth-round knockout at the hands of Mike Sears at the Hoffman Club in Lynne, Massachusetts on March 17, 1898 was his last official bout and ended his boxing career. Sears himself asked the referee to stop the bout as Weir was helpless. Weir was at the end of a harsh career at thirty-one, while Sears was then years younger.

== Career as a horse trainer ==
After quitting the ring, Weir made a living as a horse trainer for the Vanderbilt family, and he, often accompanied by his wife, frequented the horse shows at Madison Square Garden where he could stay close to his stable. He was still training horses for wealthy clients in April 1904. He lived out his remaining days in Charlestown, Massachusetts, and died on September 12, 1908, at age 41. He had been suffering for two years from an accident he had while riding a horse, and had not improved after several operations. According to at least one source, he died bankrupt, and his medical expenses were covered by a collection taken by fans at a match a few weeks before his death. He was survived by his wife Henrietta.

== Professional boxing record ==
All information in this section is derived from BoxRec, unless otherwise noted.

=== Official record ===
| 40 fights | 26 wins | 2 losses |
|---|---|---|
| By knockout | 19 | 2 |
| By decision | 7 | 0 |
| Draws | 9 | |
| Newspaper decisions/draws | 3 | |

All newspaper decisions are officially regarded as “no decision” bouts and are not counted in the win/loss/draw column.

| No. | Result | Record | Opponent | Type | Round | Date | Location | Notes |
|---|---|---|---|---|---|---|---|---|
| 40 | Loss | 26–2–9 (3) | Mike Sears | TKO | 10 (10) | Mar 17, 1898 | Southwark A.C., Philadelphia | |
| 39 | Win | 26–1–9 (3) | Jimmy Johnson | PTS | 4 (?) | Nov 19, 1894 | Southwark A.C., Philadelphia | |
| 38 | Draw | 25–1–9 (3) | Young Griffo | TD | 3 (8) | Mar 17, 1894 | 2nd Regiment Armory, Chicago | |
| 37 | Win | 25–1–8 (3) | Eddie Loeber | PTS | 4 | Dec 12, 1893 | American A.C., Boston, Massachusetts, U.S. | |
| 36 | Win | 24–1–8 (3) | Torpedo Billy Murphy | KO | 6 (?) | Nov 2, 1893 | Cribb's Club, Boston, Massachusetts, U.S. | |
| 35 | Win | 23–1–8 (3) | Professor Swarts | TKO | 3 (4) | Feb 10, 1893 | Cronheim's Theatre, Hoboken | |
| 34 | Win | 22–1–8 (3) | Al O'Brien | NWS | 4 | Feb 9, 1893 | Cronheim's Theatre, Hoboken, New Jersey, U.S. | |
| 33 | Win | 22–1–8 (2) | Al O'Brien | TKO | 3 (8) | Feb 4, 1893 | Philadelphia | |
| 32 | Win | 21–1–8 (2) | Tom Tulley | PTS | 3 (6) | Nov 20, 1892 | Nonpareil A.C., Philadelphia | |
| 31 | Win | 20–1–8 (2) | Joe Flaherty | TKO | 2 (10) | May 17, 1892 | Hennepin AC, Minneapolis, Minnesota, U.S. | |
| 30 | Draw | 19–1–8 (2) | Tommy White | PTS | 10 | Apr 19, 1892 | Hennepin AC, Minneapolis, Minnesota, U.S. | |
| 29 | Win | 19–1–7 (2) | Frank Steele | KO | 12 (?) | Feb 18, 1892 | New Bedford A.C., New Bedford | |
| 28 | Win | 18–1–7 (2) | Kentucky Rosebud | KO | 3 (?) | May 9, 1891 | Southwark A.C., Philadelphia | |
| 27 | Draw | 17–1–7 (2) | Johnny Griffin | TD | 4 (?) | Apr 25, 1891 | Nantasket | |
| 26 | Loss | 17–1–6 (2) | James Connors | NWS | 4 | Jan 17, 1891 | Australian AC, Darlinghurst, New South Wales, Australia | |
| 25 | Win | 17–1–6 (1) | James Connors | KO | 3 (?) | Jul 7, 1890 | Erie County AC, Buffalo | |
| 24 | Loss | 16–1–6 (1) | Torpedo Billy Murphy | KO | 14 (30) | Jan 13, 1890 | California A.C., San Francisco | Lost world featherweight title |
| 23 | Draw | 16–0–6 (1) | Frank Murphy | PTS | 80 (?) | Mar 31, 1889 | O'Brien's Opera House, Kouts | Captured world featherweight title |
| 22 | Win | 16–0–5 (1) | John Beck | KO | 3 (6) | Jan 24, 1889 | Elm Rink, New Bedford | |
| 21 | Win | 15–0–5 (1) | Tommy Danforth | KO | 8 (?) | Dec 4, 1888 | Athenian Club, Boston, Massachusetts, U.S. | Retained world featherweight title |
| 20 | Win | 14–0–5 (1) | Jack Havlin | NWS | 6 | Mar 28, 1888 | Music Hall, Boston, Massachusetts, U.S. | |
| 19 | Win | 14–0–5 | Dominick Barnes | PTS | 6 | Feb 17, 1888 | Theatre Comique, Minneapolis, Minnesota, U.S. | Retained world featherweight title |
| 18 | Win | 13–0–5 | Tommy Burke | KO | 5 (8) | Feb 10, 1888 | Theatre Comique, Minneapolis | |
| 17 | Win | 12–0–5 | George Siddons | TKO | 11 (15) | Feb 3, 1888 | Duluth | |
| 16 | Win | 11–0–5 | Tommy Miller | KO | 7 (?) | Jan 23, 1888 | Washington Roller Rink, Minneapolis, Minnesota, U.S. | Retained world featherweight title |
| 15 | Draw | 10–0–5 | Tommy Warren | PTS | 20 | Dec 12, 1887 | Washington Roller Rink, Minneapolis, Minnesota, U.S. | Retained world featherweight title |
| 14 | Draw | 10–0–4 | Johnny Murphy | PTS | 17 (?) | Sep 30, 1887 | West End A.C., Boston, Massachusetts, U.S. | Retained world featherweight title |
| 13 | Draw | 10–0–3 | Jack Havlin | PTS | 61 (?) | Jul 20, 1887 | Rocky Point, Pawtucket, Rhode Island, U.S. | Retained world featherweight title |
| 12 | Win | 10–0–2 | Willie Clark | RTD | 20 (?) | Apr 30, 1887 | Long Island City, Queens, New York City, New York, U.S. | Retained world featherweight title |
| 11 | Win | 9–0–2 | Jack Williams | KO | 36 (?) | Mar 10, 1886 | Westerly, Rhode Island, U.S. | Retained world featherweight title |
| 10 | Win | 8–0–2 | Arnold A Rand | KO | 2 (?) | Feb 25, 1887 | Boston, Massachusetts, U.S. | |
| 9 | Win | 7–0–2 | Jack Farrell | KO | 7 (?) | Jan 24, 1887 | Ridgefield, New Jersey, U.S. | Won inaugural world featherweight title |
| 8 | Draw | 6–0–2 | Johnny Aaron | PTS | 5 (?) | Jan 7, 1887 | Fair Play Club, Boston, Massachusetts, U.S. | |
| 7 | Win | 6–0–1 | Young George Badger | TKO | 2 (?) | Dec 15, 1886 | Boston, Massachusetts, U.S. | |
| 6 | Win | 5–0–1 | Martin Burns | KO | 6 (?) | Oct 29, 1886 | Boston, Massachusetts, U.S. | |
| 5 | Win | 4–0–1 | James Furman | TKO | 5 (6) | Oct 29, 1886 | Fair Play Club, Boston, Massachusetts, U.S. | |
| 4 | Win | 3–0–1 | William Snee | PTS | 4 | May 28, 1886 | Athenian Club, Boston, Massachusetts, U.S. | |
| 3 | Win | 2–0–1 | Billy Sykes | PTS | 4 | Feb 6, 1886 | Liverpool, Merseyside, England | |
| 2 | Draw | 1–0–1 | Ulrich Conley | PTS | 6 | Jan 6, 1886 | Preston, Lancashire, England | |
| 1 | Win | 1–0 | W Harlow | PTS | 10 | Oct 9, 1885 | Salford, Lancashire, England | |

=== Unofficial record ===
| 40 fights | 28 wins | 3 losses |
|---|---|---|
| By knockout | 19 | 2 |
| By decision | 9 | 1 |
| Draws | 9 | |

Record with the inclusion of newspaper decisions in the win/loss/draw column.

| No. | Result | Record | Opponent | Type | Round | Date | Location | Notes |
|---|---|---|---|---|---|---|---|---|
| 40 | Loss | 28–3–9 | Mike Sears | TKO | 10 (10) | Mar 17, 1898 | Southwark A.C., Philadelphia, Pennsylvania, U.S. | |
| 39 | Win | 28–2–9 | Jimmy Johnson | PTS | 4 (?) | Nov 19, 1894 | Southwark A.C., Philadelphia, Pennsylvania, U.S. | |
| 38 | Draw | 27–2–9 | Young Griffo | TD | 3 (8) | Mar 17, 1894 | 2nd Regiment Armory, Chicago, Illinois, U.S. | |
| 37 | Win | 27–2–8 | Eddie Loeber | PTS | 4 | Dec 12, 1893 | American A.C., Boston, Massachusetts, U.S. | |
| 36 | Win | 26–2–8 | Torpedo Billy Murphy | KO | 6 (?) | Nov 2, 1893 | Cribb's Club, Boston, Massachusetts, U.S. | |
| 35 | Win | 25–2–8 | Professor Swarts | TKO | 3 (4) | Feb 10, 1893 | Cronheim's Theatre, Hoboken, New Jersey, U.S. | |
| 34 | Win | 24–2–8 | Al O'Brien | NWS | 4 | Feb 9, 1893 | Cronheim's Theatre, Hoboken, New Jersey, U.S., New Jersey, U.S. | |
| 33 | Win | 23–2–8 | Al O'Brien | TKO | 3 (8) | Feb 4, 1893 | Philadelphia, Pennsylvania, U.S. | |
| 32 | Win | 22–2–8 | Tom Tulley | PTS | 3 (6) | Nov 20, 1892 | Nonpareil A.C., Philadelphia, Pennsylvania, U.S. | |
| 31 | Win | 21–2–8 | Joe Flaherty | TKO | 2 (10) | May 17, 1892 | Hennepin AC, Minneapolis, Minnesota, U.S. | |
| 30 | Draw | 20–2–8 | Tommy White | PTS | 10 | Apr 19, 1892 | Hennepin AC, Minneapolis, Minnesota, U.S. | |
| 29 | Win | 20–2–7 | Frank Steele | KO | 12 (?) | Feb 18, 1892 | New Bedford A.C., New Bedford, Massachusetts, U.S. | |
| 28 | Win | 19–2–7 | Kentucky Rosebud | KO | 3 (?) | May 9, 1891 | Southwark A.C., Philadelphia, Pennsylvania, U.S. | |
| 27 | Draw | 18–2–7 | Johnny Griffin | TD | 4 (?) | Apr 25, 1891 | Nantasket, Massachusetts, U.S. | |
| 26 | Loss | 18–2–6 | James Connors | NWS | 4 | Jan 17, 1891 | Australian AC, Darlinghurst, New South Wales, Australia | |
| 25 | Win | 18–1–6 | James Connors | KO | 3 (?) | Jul 7, 1890 | Erie County AC, Buffalo, New York, U.S. | |
| 24 | Loss | 17–1–6 | Torpedo Billy Murphy | KO | 14 (30) | Jan 13, 1890 | California A.C., San Francisco, California, U.S. | Lost world featherweight title |
| 23 | Draw | 17–0–6 | Frank Murphy | PTS | 80 (?) | Mar 31, 1889 | O'Brien's Opera House, Kouts, Indiana, U.S. | Retained world featherweight title |
| 22 | Win | 17–0–5 | John Beck | KO | 3 (6) | Jan 24, 1889 | Elm Rink, New Bedford, Massachusetts, U.S. | |
| 21 | Win | 16–0–5 | Tommy Danforth | KO | 8 (?) | Dec 4, 1888 | Athenian Club, Boston, Massachusetts, U.S. | Retained world featherweight title |
| 20 | Win | 15–0–5 | Jack Havlin | NWS | 6 | Mar 28, 1888 | Music Hall, Boston, Massachusetts, U.S. | |
| 19 | Win | 14–0–5 | Dominick Barnes | PTS | 6 | Feb 17, 1888 | Theatre Comique, Minneapolis, Minnesota, U.S. | Retained world featherweight title |
| 18 | Win | 13–0–5 | Tommy Burke | KO | 5 (8) | Feb 10, 1888 | Theatre Comique, Minneapolis, Minnesota, U.S. | |
| 17 | Win | 12–0–5 | George Siddons | TKO | 11 (15) | Feb 3, 1888 | Duluth, Minnesota, U.S. | |
| 16 | Win | 11–0–5 | Tommy Miller | KO | 7 (?) | Jan 23, 1888 | Washington Roller Rink, Minneapolis, Minnesota, U.S. | Retained world featherweight title |
| 15 | Draw | 10–0–5 | Tommy Warren | PTS | 20 | Dec 12, 1887 | Washington Roller Rink, Minneapolis, Minnesota, U.S. | Retained world featherweight title |
| 14 | Draw | 10–0–4 | Johnny Murphy | PTS | 17 (?) | Sep 30, 1887 | West End A.C., Boston, Massachusetts, U.S. | Retained world featherweight title |
| 13 | Draw | 10–0–3 | Jack Havlin | PTS | 61 (?) | Jul 20, 1887 | Rocky Point, Pawtucket, Rhode Island, U.S. | Retained world featherweight title |
| 12 | Win | 10–0–2 | Willie Clark | RTD | 20 (?) | Apr 30, 1887 | Long Island City, Queens, New York City, New York, U.S. | Retained world featherweight title |
| 11 | Win | 9–0–2 | Jack Williams | KO | 36 (?) | Mar 10, 1886 | Westerly, Rhode Island, U.S. | Retained world featherweight title |
| 10 | Win | 8–0–2 | Arnold A Rand | KO | 2 (?) | Feb 25, 1887 | Boston, Massachusetts, U.S. | |
| 9 | Win | 7–0–2 | Jack Farrell | KO | 7 (?) | Jan 24, 1887 | Ridgefield, New Jersey, U.S. | Won inaugural world featherweight title |
| 8 | Draw | 6–0–2 | Johnny Aaron | PTS | 5 (?) | Jan 7, 1887 | Fair Play Club, Boston, Massachusetts, U.S. | |
| 7 | Win | 6–0–1 | Young George Badger | TKO | 2 (?) | Dec 15, 1886 | Boston, Massachusetts, U.S. | |
| 6 | Win | 5–0–1 | Martin Burns | KO | 6 (?) | Oct 29, 1886 | Boston, Massachusetts, U.S. | |
| 5 | Win | 4–0–1 | James Furman | TKO | 5 (6) | Oct 29, 1886 | Fair Play Club, Boston, Massachusetts, U.S. | |
| 4 | Win | 3–0–1 | William Snee | PTS | 4 | May 28, 1886 | Athenian Club, Boston, Massachusetts, U.S. | |
| 3 | Win | 2–0–1 | Billy Sykes | PTS | 4 | Feb 6, 1886 | Liverpool, Merseyside, England | |
| 2 | Draw | 1–0–1 | Ulrich Conley | PTS | 6 | Jan 6, 1886 | Preston, Lancashire, England, U.K. | |
| 1 | Win | 1–0 | W Harlow | PTS | 10 | Oct 9, 1885 | Salford, Lancashire, England, U.K. | |

== Achievements ==
Achievements
| Preceded by Inaugural Champion | World Featherweight Championship; March 31, 1889 - January 13, 1890 | Succeeded by Torpedo Billy Murphy |
