= Carlos Alberto Breis Pereira =

Dom Carlos Alberto Breis Pereira O.F.M.
- Archbishop of Maceió
- Native name: Carlos Alberto Breis Pereira
- Church: Catholic Church
- Archdiocese: Archdiocese of Maceió
- Predecessor: Antônio Muniz Fernandes

Orders
- Ordination: August 20, 1994 by Aloísio Lorscheider
- Consecration: May 7, 2016 by Antônio Fernando Saburido

Personal details
- Born: São Francisco do Sul
- Education: Antonianum
- Motto: Natus Nobis in Via ("He was born for us in the way")

Carlos Alberto Breis Pereira, O.F.M. (São Francisco do Sul, September 16, 1965), commonly known as Dom Beto is a Brazilian Franciscan friar and Catholic bishop. Currently, Dom Beto is the archbishop of Maceió.

== Biography ==
Carlos Alberto Breis Pereira was born on September 16, 1965, at São Francisco do Sul, Santa Catarina, Brazil. Later, entered the Franciscans by the Province of the Immaculate Conception of Brazil, saying his vows at January 10, 1987. Some years later, Carlos Alberto was transferred to the Province of Saint Anthony of Brazil, in the northeastern region, being ordained a priest at August 20, 1994.

Breis studied philosophy at the Recife Institute of Theology (ITER) between 1988 and 1989 and Theology at the Franciscan Institute of Theology of Olinda (IFTO) between the years of 1990 and 1993. He also obtained his licenciate in Spiritual Theology at the Antonianum, Rome, between the years of 2005 and 2007.

Serving the Franciscans, Pereira occupied a variety of roles, mainly related to education and training of Fransciscans and Franciscan teachers. When he was chosen for the episcopate, Carlos Alberto was serving his term as President of the Conference of the Friars Minor of Brazil.

On February 17, 2016, Pope Francis appointed Breis as the coadjutor bishop of the Diocese of Juazeiro. He was later consecrated later that year at May 7, during a Mass celebrated at the Basilica of the Sacred Heart of Jesus. The bishops responsible for the consecration were the Benedictine Antônio Fernando Saburido, Archbishop of Olinda and Recife at the time, the Assumptionist José Geraldo da Cruz, bishop of Juazeiro, and the Fransciscan José Haring, bishop of Limoeiro do Norte. Carlos Alberto Breis became bishop of Juazeiro later that year on September 7.

At November 8, 2023, Pope Francis appointed Breis as the coadjutor bishop of the Archdiocese of Maceió. At April 3, 2024, Pereira became the new archbishop, succeeding the Carmelite Antônio Muniz Fernandes.
