= Archdiocese of Maceió =

Catholic ecclesiastical territory

Coordinates: 9.6652°S 35.7352°W

Archdiocese of Maceió Archidioecesis Maceiensis

Catholic
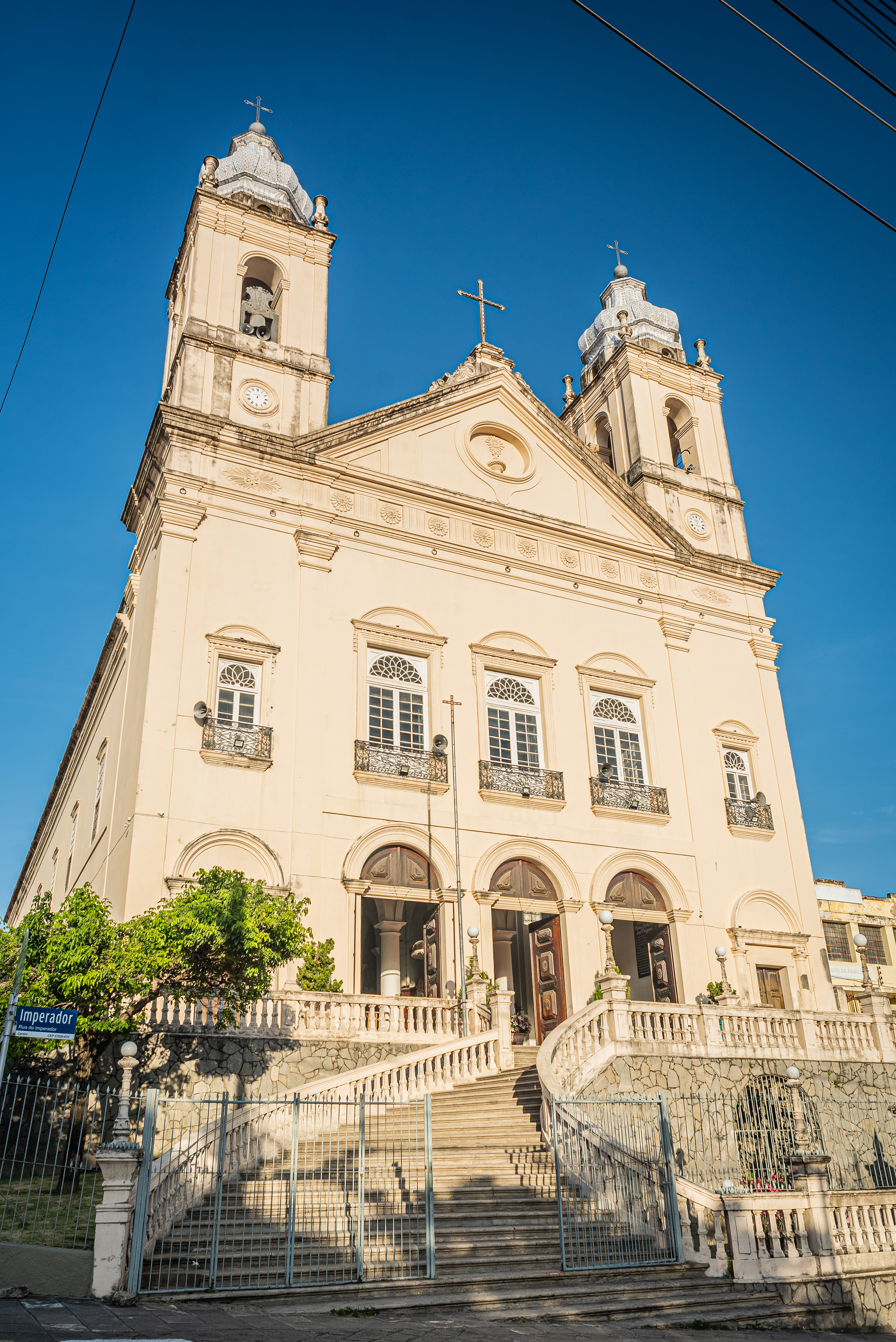
- Metropolitan Cathedral

- Coat of arms

Location
- Country: Brazil

Statistics
- Area: 8,545 km^{2} (3,299 sq mi)
- Population: Total; Catholics: (as of 2003); 1,452,476; 944,100 (65.0%)

Information
- Denomination: Roman Catholic
- Rite: Latin Rite
- Established: 2 July 1900 (126 years ago)
- Cathedral: Catedral Metropolitana Nossa Senhora dos Prazeres
- Language: Portuguese

Current leadership
- Pope: Leo XIV
- Archbishop-designate: Dom. Carlos Alberto Breis Pereira, O.F.M.
- Bishops emeritus: Edvaldo Gonçalves Amaral, S.D.B. Antônio Muniz Fernandes, O. Carm.

Website
- arqdemaceio.com.br

The Roman Catholic Archdiocese of Maceió (Latin: Archidioecesis Maceiensis) is an archdiocese located in the city of Maceió in Brazil.

== History ==
- July 2, 1900: Established as Diocese of Alagôas from the Diocese of Olinda;
- August 25, 1917: Renamed as Diocese of Maceió;
- February 13, 1920: Promoted as Metropolitan Archdiocese of Maceió

== Bishops ==
=== Ordinaries ===
The following table contains all the bishops in the history of the Archidiocese, in reverse chronological order.

Name	Order or Congregation	Title	Time of rule
Carlos Alberto Breis Pereira	Franciscans	Archbishop	2024.04.03 – present
Antônio Muniz Fernandes	Carmelites	Archbishop	2006.11.22 – 2024.04.03
José Carlos Melo	Congregation of the Mission	Archbishop	2002.07.03 – 2006.11.22
Edvaldo Gonçalves Amaral	Salesians of Don Bosco	Archbishop	1985.10.24 – 2002.07.03
José Lamartine Soares		Archbishop	1985.04.02 – 1985.08.18
Miguel Fenelon Câmara Filho		Archbishop	1976.11.24 – 1984.10.07
Adelmo Cavalcante Machado		Archbishop	1963.10.19 – 1976.11.24
Ranulfo da Silva Farias		Archbishop	1939.08.05 – 1963.10.19
Santino Maria da Silva Coutinho		Archbishop	1923.01.19 – 1939.01.10
Manoel Antônio de Oliveira Lopes		Archbishop	1920.02.13 – 1922.07.27
Manoel Antônio de Oliveira Lopes		Bishop of Maceió	1910.11.26 – 1920.02.13
Antônio Manoel de Castilho Brandão		Bishop of Alagoas	1901.06.05 –1910.03.15

=== Coadjutor archbishops ===
- Adelmo Cavalcante Machado (1955–1963)
- Miguel Fenelon Câmara Filho (1974–1976)
- José Carlos Melo, C.M. (2000–2002)

=== Auxiliary bishop ===
- Eliseu Maria Gomes de Oliveira, O. Carm. (1968–1974), appointed Bishop of Caetité, Bahia

=== Other priests of this diocese who became bishops ===
- José Maurício da Rocha, appointed Bishop of Corumbá, Mato Grosso do Sul in 1919
- Henrique Soares da Costa, appointed Auxiliary Bishop of Aracajú, Sergipe in 2009

== Suffragan dioceses ==
- Diocese of Palmeira dos Índios
- Diocese of Penedo

== Sources ==
- GCatholic.org
- Catholic Hierarchy
