= Miguel Fenelon Câmara Filho =

Brazilian Roman Catholic archbishop (1925–2018)

- Archbishop of Teresina
- Church: Catholic Church
- Archdiocese: Archdiocese of Teresina
- In office: 7 October 1984 – 21 February 2001
- Predecessor: José Freire Falcão
- Successor: Celso José Pinto da Silva
- Previous posts: Archbishop of Maceió (1976-1984); Coadjutor Archbishop of Maceió (1974-1976); Titular Bishop of Ath Truim (1970-1976); Auxiliary Bishop of Fortaleza (1970-1974)

Orders
- Ordination: 8 December 1948
- Consecration: 19 March 1970 by Eugênio Sales

Personal details
- Born: 4 April 1925 Quixeramobim, Ceará, Republic of the United States of Brazil
- Died: 28 June 2018 (aged 93) Teresina, Piauí, Brazil

Miguel Fenelon Câmara Filho (4 April 1925 – 28 June 2018) was a Brazilian Catholic archbishop.

Câmara Filho was born in Brazil and was ordained to the priesthood in 1948. He served as auxiliary bishop of the Roman Catholic Archdiocese of Fortaleza, Brazil, and titular bishop of AthTruim, from 1970 to 1974. Câmara Filho then served as coadjutor of the Roman Catholic Archdiocese of Maceio, Brazil, from 1974 to 1976 and as archbishop of the archdiocese from 1976 to 1984. Finally Câmara Filho served as archbishop of the Roman Catholic Archdiocese of Teresina, Brazil from 1986 to 2001.
