= Fernando Iório Rodrigues =

- Bishop of Palmeira dos Índios
- Church: Catholic Church
- Diocese: Diocese of Palmeira dos Índios
- In office: 1 March 1985 – 12 July 2006
- Predecessor: Epaminondas José de Araújo
- Successor: Dulcênio Fontes de Matos

Orders
- Ordination: 30 November 1953
- Consecration: 29 May 1985 by Otávio Barbosa Aguiar

Personal details
- Born: 23 June 1929 Maceió, Alagoas, United States of Brazil
- Died: 20 March 2010 (aged 80) Maceió, Alagoas, Brazil

Fernando Iório Rodrigues (June 23, 1929 in Maceió – March 20, 2010) was a Brazilian Roman Catholic prelate and professor, who served as the Bishop of the Roman Catholic Diocese of Palmeira dos Índios, based in Palmeira dos Índios, from March 1, 1985, until July 12, 2006.

Rodrigues was ordained a Roman Catholic priest in 1953.

He was hospitalized in March 2010 for ten days at Santa Casa de Misericórdia de Maceió due to heart problems, before his death.
