= José Carlos Melo =

Brazilian Roman Catholic archbishop

Jóse Carlos Melo C.M. (4 June 1930 – 30 May 2017) was a Roman Catholic archbishop.

Ordained to the priesthood in 1955, Melo was named auxiliary bishop of the Roman Catholic Archdiocese of São Salvador de Bahia, Brazil, in 1991. From 2000 to 2006, Melo served archbishop of the Roman Catholic Archdiocese of Maceio.
