= Epaminondas José de Araújo =

Brazilian Catholic bishop

- Bishop of Palmeira dos Índios
- Church: Catholic Church
- Diocese: Diocese of Palmeira dos Índios
- In office: 5 June 1978 – 28 November 1984
- Predecessor: Otávio Barbosa Aguiar
- Successor: Fernando Iório Rodrigues
- Previous posts: Bishop of Anápolis (1966-1978); Bishop of Ruy Barbosa (1959-1966)

Orders
- Ordination: 12 August 1945
- Consecration: 27 March 1960 by Armando Lombardi

Personal details
- Born: 19 March 1922 Caiçara, Paraíba, Republic of the United States of Brazil
- Died: 9 June 2010 (aged 88) João Pessoa, Paraíba, Brazil

Epaminondas José de Araújo (19 March 1922 - Caiçara – 9 June 2010 - João Pessoa). Filho do sr. Epaminondas José de Araújo e da sra Lídia de Araújo, was the Catholic bishop of the Diocese of Palmeira dos Índios, Brazil. Ordained a priest on 12 August 1945, de Araújo was appointed bishop on 14 December 1959 and was ordained on 27 March 1960. He served in three different dioceses in Brazil.

== See also ==
- Catholic Church in Brazil
