= Palmeira dos Índios =

Municipality of Alagoas, Brazil

- Municipality
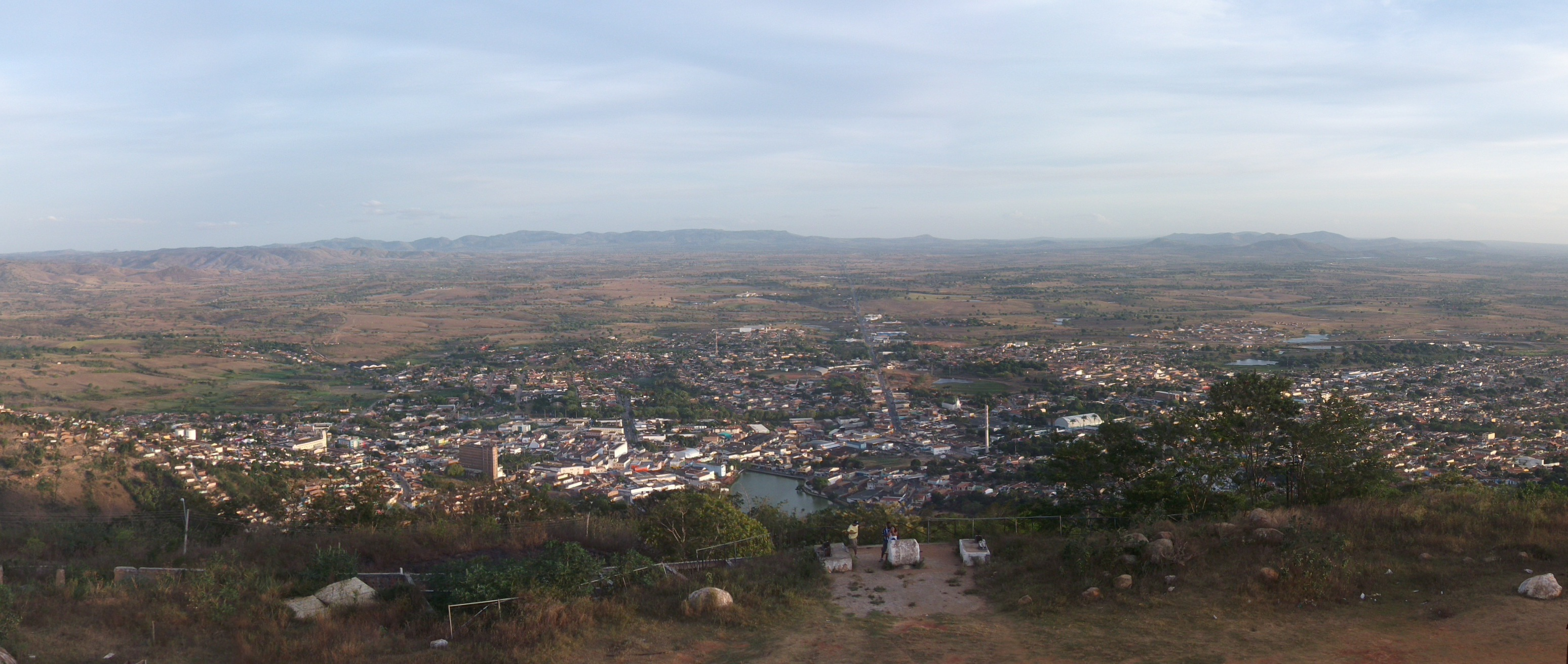

- Flag Coat of arms

- Location of Palmeira dos Índios in the State of Alagoas

- Location in Brazil
- Coordinates: 9°24′25″S 36°37′40″W
- Country: Brazil
- State: Alagoas
- Mesoregion: Agreste Alagoano
- Microregion: Palmeira dos Índios
- Founded: 1835

Government
  - Mayor: Julio Cézar

Area
  - Total: 460.610 km^{2} (177.843 sq mi)
- Elevation: 290 m (950 ft)

Population (2020.)
  - Total: 73,337
  - Density: 159.22/km^{2} (412.37/sq mi)
- Demonym: Palmeirenses
- Time zone: UTC−3 (BRT)
- Website: Official website

Palmeira dos Índios (Central northeastern portuguese pronunciation: [pɐwˈmeɾɐ dʊˈzĩdʒʊ]) is a municipality located in the west of the Brazilian state of Alagoas. As of 2010, it has a population of around 70,000.

The city is situated in the interior of Alagoas. The Brazilian writer Graciliano Ramos was its mayor in 1927. It is the seat of the Roman Catholic Diocese of Palmeira dos Índios.

== History ==
Palmeira dos Índios was originally inhabited by the Xukuru people. It was established as a parish in 1798 and transformed into a town in 1835.

== Languages ==
Xukuru-Kariri was spoken in Palmeira dos Índios.

== Climate ==
Climate data for Palmeira dos Índios (1991–2020 normals, extremes 1961–present)
Month	Jan	Feb	Mar	Apr	May	Jun	Jul	Aug	Sep	Oct	Nov	Dec	Year
Record high °C (°F)	38.9 (102.0)	37.9 (100.2)	37.4 (99.3)	36.9 (98.4)	36.4 (97.5)	33.0 (91.4)	30.8 (87.4)	32.8 (91.0)	35.3 (95.5)	38.8 (101.8)	37.8 (100.0)	38.7 (101.7)	38.9 (102.0)
Mean daily maximum °C (°F)	33.2 (91.8)	33.1 (91.6)	33.0 (91.4)	31.5 (88.7)	29.3 (84.7)	27.3 (81.1)	26.5 (79.7)	27.0 (80.6)	28.9 (84.0)	31.2 (88.2)	32.9 (91.2)	33.6 (92.5)	30.6 (87.1)
Daily mean °C (°F)	26.5 (79.7)	26.5 (79.7)	26.7 (80.1)	25.8 (78.4)	24.5 (76.1)	23.0 (73.4)	22.1 (71.8)	22.2 (72.0)	23.2 (73.8)	24.7 (76.5)	25.9 (78.6)	26.5 (79.7)	24.8 (76.6)
Mean daily minimum °C (°F)	21.5 (70.7)	21.6 (70.9)	21.9 (71.4)	21.5 (70.7)	20.7 (69.3)	19.8 (67.6)	18.9 (66.0)	18.6 (65.5)	19.0 (66.2)	20.0 (68.0)	20.8 (69.4)	21.4 (70.5)	20.5 (68.9)
Record low °C (°F)	15.1 (59.2)	15.0 (59.0)	15.6 (60.1)	15.4 (59.7)	14.7 (58.5)	12.4 (54.3)	14.8 (58.6)	14.3 (57.7)	10.8 (51.4)	16.2 (61.2)	14.6 (58.3)	15.7 (60.3)	10.8 (51.4)
Average precipitation mm (inches)	43.3 (1.70)	45.6 (1.80)	57.7 (2.27)	85.8 (3.38)	131.6 (5.18)	148.8 (5.86)	131.4 (5.17)	88.7 (3.49)	41.7 (1.64)	29.3 (1.15)	15.7 (0.62)	22.6 (0.89)	842.2 (33.16)
Average precipitation days (≥ 1.0 mm)	5	5	6	9	14	18	19	14	7	3	2	2	104
Average relative humidity (%)	67.8	69.3	70.8	75.7	80.7	85.0	85.1	82.7	77.9	71.9	66.6	65.6	74.9
Mean monthly sunshine hours	246.8	222.2	235.0	211.9	182.8	152.8	156.0	183.7	220.8	267.4	279.8	277.9	2,637.1
Source 1: Instituto Nacional de Meteorologia
Source 2: Meteo Climat (record highs and lows)

== See also ==
- Fernando Iório Rodrigues
