= Diocese of Juazeiro =

Catholic ecclesiastical territory

Coordinates: 9.4122°S 40.4993°W

Diocese of Juazeiro Dioecesis Iuazeiriensis Diocese de Juazeiro
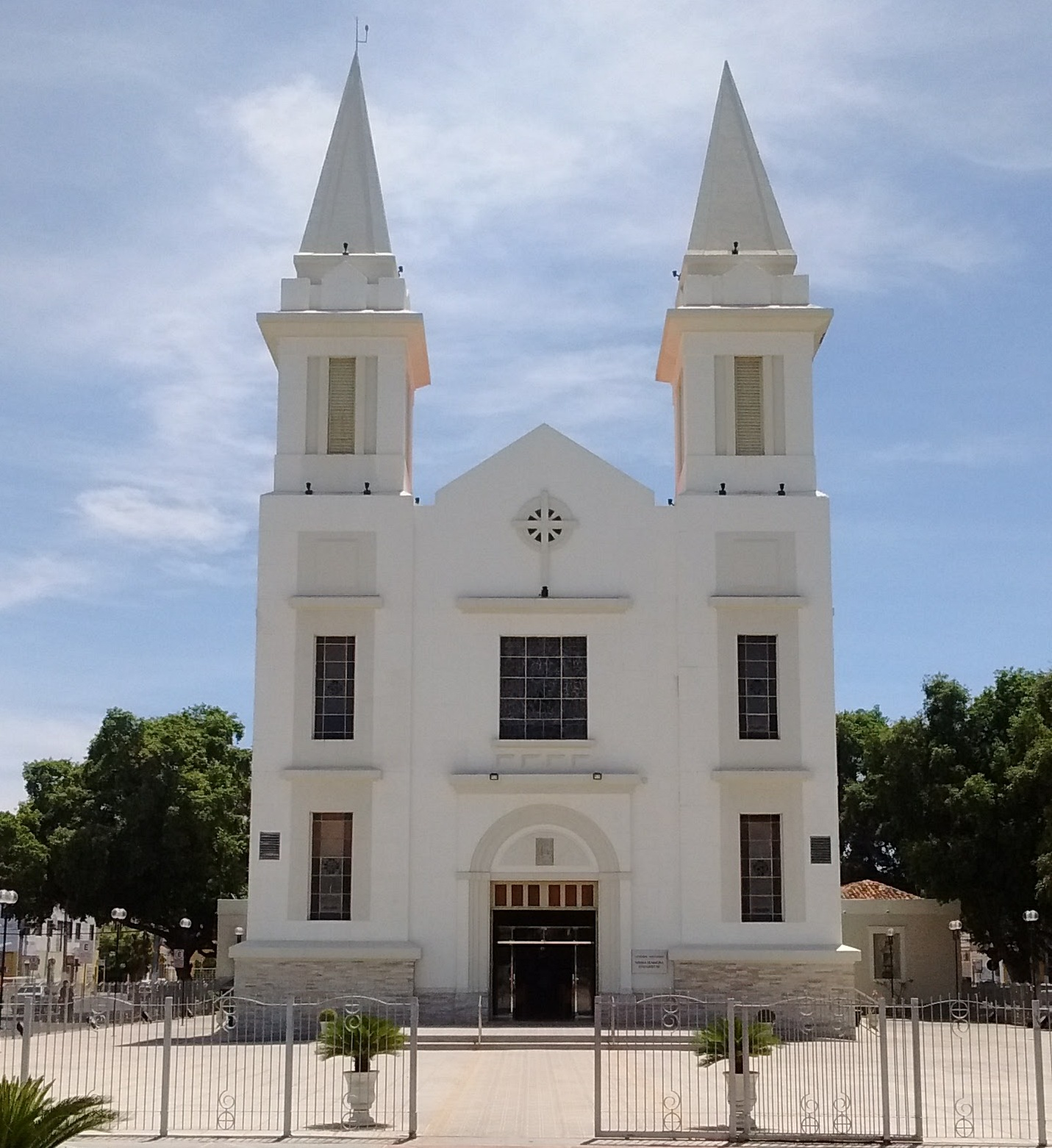
- Catedral Nossa Senhora das Grotas

Location
- Country: Brazil
- Ecclesiastical province: Feira de Santana
- Metropolitan: Feira de Santana

Statistics
- Area: 56,249 km^{2} (21,718 sq mi)
- Population: Total; Catholics: (as of 2006); 433,000; 373,000 (86.1%)

Information
- Rite: Latin Rite
- Established: 22 July 1962 (63 years ago)
- Cathedral: Cathedral of Our Lady of Grotas in Juazeiro

Current leadership
- Pope: Leo XIV
- Bishop: Valdemir Vicente Andrade Santos
- Metropolitan Archbishop: Zanoni Demettino Castro

The Roman Catholic Diocese of Juazeiro (Latin: Dioecesis Iuazeiriensis) is a diocese located in the city of Juazeiro in the ecclesiastical province of Feira de Santana in Brazil.

== History ==
- July 22, 1962: Established as Diocese of Juazeiro from the Diocese of Barra and Diocese of Bonfim

== Bishops ==
- Bishops of Juazeiro (Roman rite), in reverse chronological order
  - Bishop Valdemir Vicente Andrade Santos (2024.07.11 - Present
  - Bishop Carlos Alberto Breis Pereira, O.F.M. (2016.09.07 - 2023.11.09)
  - Bishop José Geraldo da Cruz, A.A. (2003.06.04 – 2016.09.07)
  - Bishop José Rodrigues de Souza, C.Ss.R. (1974.12.12 – 2003.06.04)
  - Bishop Tomás Guilherme Murphy, C.Ss.R. (1962.10.16 – 1973.12.29)

=== Coadjutor bishop ===
- Carlos Alberto Breis Pereira, O.F.M. (2016)
