= Diocese of Penedo =

Catholic ecclesiastical territory

Diocese of Penedo Dioecesis Penedensis

Catholic
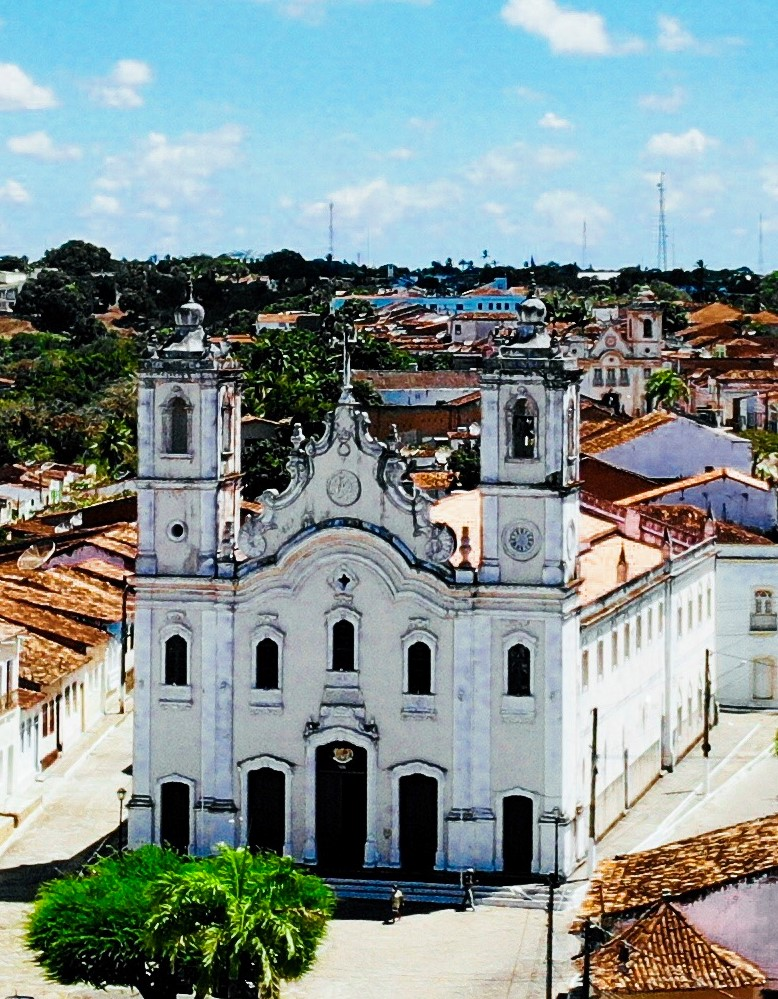
- Catedral Nossa Senhora do Rosário in 2018

Location
- Country: Brazil
- Ecclesiastical province: Maceió

Statistics
- Area: 8,298 km^{2} (3,204 sq mi)
- Population: Total; Catholics: (as of 2004); 832,365; 774,100 (93%)

Information
- Rite: Latin Rite
- Established: 3 April 1916 (110 years ago)
- Cathedral: Catedral Nossa Senhora do Rosário

Current leadership
- Pope: Leo XIV
- Bishop: Valdemir Ferreira dos Santos

The Roman Catholic Diocese of Penedo (Latin: Dioecesis Penedensis) is a diocese located in the city of Penedo in the ecclesiastical province of Maceió in Brazil.

== History ==
- April 3, 1916: Established as Diocese of Penedo from the Diocese of Alagôas

== Bishops ==
- Bishops of Penedo (Roman rite), in reverse chronological order
  - Bishop Valdemir Ferreira dos Santos (2021.08.18 – ...)
  - Bishop Valério Breda, S.D.B. (1997.07.30 – 2020.06.16)
  - Bishop Constantino José Lüers, O.F.M. (1976.03.24 – 1994.01.26)
  - Bishop José Terceiro de Sousa (1957.11.09 – 1976.03.24)
  - Bishop Felix César da Cunha Vasconcellos, O.F.M. (1949.03.30 – 1957.04.03), appointed Coadjutor Archbishop of Florianópolis, Santa Catarina
  - Bishop Fernando Gomes dos Santos (1943.01.09 – 1949.02.01), appointed Bishop of Aracajú; future Archbishop
  - Bishop Jonas de Araújo Batinga (1918.01.28 – 1940.07.30)
