= José Rodrigues de Souza =

José Rodriques de Souza, C.Ss.R. (Paraíba do Sul, 25 March 1926 – Goiânia, 9 September 2012) was the Catholic bishop of the Diocese of Juazeiro, Brazil.

Ordained to the priesthood in 1950, Rodriques de Souza was named bishop in 1975 and retired in 2003.
