= Torpedo Billy Murphy =

New Zealand boxer (1863–1939)

Billy Murphy
- Murphy with National Police Gazette Belt

Personal information
- Nicknames: Torpedo Billy Murphy; Australian Billy Murphy
- Nationality: New Zealand
- Born: Thomas William Murphy; 3 November 1863 Auckland, New Zealand
- Died: 26 July 1939 (aged 75) Auckland, New Zealand
- Height: 5 ft 6.5 in (1.69 m)
- Weight: Featherweight

Boxing career
- Stance: Orthodox

Boxing record
- Total fights: 221
- Wins: 90
- Win by KO: 76
- Losses: 51
- Draws: 24
- No contests: 40

Thomas William Murphy (3 November 1863 – 26 July 1939) was a New Zealand boxer. An early World Featherweight Champion, he was the first world champion of any weightclass to come from New Zealand. In his early career, he took the New Zealand Lightweight Championship.

He was a prolific boxer who participated in more than 200 bouts, some of which lasted as long as 30 to 40 rounds. He was known primarily for his powerful punching ability rather than his defensive skills.

== Early life and career ==
Murphy was born in Auckland and began boxing there before continuing his career in Australia. He called his deadly right, his "Torpedo" punch, which also referred to his ring name.

=== New Zealand Light champ, 1887 ===
On 26 July 1887, he defeated Richard Long in a seventh round knockout at the Opera House in Wellington, New Zealand. The fight was billed as the Lightweight Championship of New Zealand. On 20 August 1887, he defeated John Scotty Fades at the Princess Theatre in a second round knockout at Dunedin, New Zealand, defending his title as Lightweight Champion of New Zealand. On 24 November 1887, he lost a New Zealand Lightweight Title bout with a sixth round disqualification against Ike Fake in Wellington, New Zealand.

He defended the title successfully on 23 June and 1 July 1888 against Joe Molloy and Edward Jones in two fifth round knockouts. These bouts demonstrated the strong punch he had in his early career. In a fourth round knockout, he defeated Jim Saxon in another New Zealand Lightweight Title match on 1 September 1888. On 2 February 1889, he lost to Tommy Williams at the Princess Theatre in Dunedin, New Zealand, in a fourth round disqualification, in what was billed as another New Zealand Lightweight Championship.

=== Coming to America, 1889 ===
He arrived in San Francisco in June 1889 aboard the steamer Zelandia.

In his first fight in America, he defeated Johnny Griffin, an exceptionally talented featherweight, in a third round knockout at the California Club in San Francisco on 12 July 1889.

In an important bout on 30 July 1889, he fought a twenty-seven round draw against English champion Frank Murphy in what was billed as a World 120 pound title match. The bout was fought at the California Athletic Club in San Francisco for a purse of $1,800. In a close fight, Frank Murphy was down twice in the fifteenth, but had the better of the seventeenth through nineteenth rounds. Frank Murphy was down again in the twenty-second round. The fight was stopped by Referee Cook with the help of the police in the twenty-seventh because neither men appeared to be able to continue the match. Upon examination in their dressing rooms after the match, Billy Murphy was found to have a fracture of the radius of his left arm, and Frank Murphy's wrist was swollen and bruised. Torpedo Billy paused in his boxing schedule for five months to recover. From the twentieth through the final twenty-seventh round, both men appeared fatigued and did far less fighting than the first twenty rounds.

== World Feather Champion, 1890 ==
Ike Weir, World Featherweight Champion

Murphey won the World Featherweight title on 13 January 1890 defeating Ike Weir in a fourteenth round knockout at the California Athletic Club in San Francisco, California. In the final round, possibly to show his dominance and contempt for his opponent, Weir did a backflip. Murphey immediately unloaded a serious right as Weir landed, known as the "torpedo punch", which resulted in a knockdown that ended the bout after a count of ten. The purse for the fight was $2,250.

According to one source, Weir, who led through much of the bout, was down repeatedly in the thirteenth round when Murphy rallied. In a rematch, on 2 November 1893, Murphy lost to Weir in a sixth round knockout, which was one of the high points of Weir's late career. In the fourth round, Weir knocked Murphy entirely out of the ring. Weir successfully used his clever ducking and bobbing as a defense in the fight, avoiding Murphy's powerful right which had plagued him in their earlier title bout.

== Losing World Feather title, 1890 ==
After the match with Weir, he defeated Tommy Warren, Tommy White, and Eddie Greaney before returning to Australia in September 1890. Murphy was considered to have forfeited his title because he left the United States to return to New Zealand. However, Australia and New Zealand continued to recognise his title until he lost to Albert Griffiths known as Young Griffo in Sydney on 2 September 1890. The bout was recognised as a Featherweight World Title match by Great Britain and Australia. Griffo was knocked down twice in the first three rounds. The fight ended in the fifteenth when a right to Murphy's jaw led him to throw off his gloves and concede the fight.

He would lose to Young Griffo again on 22 July 1891 at the Sydney Amateur Athletic Club in another World Featherweight Title match. The bout would end in a twenty-second round disqualification against Murphy.

== Boxing after return to the United States ==
He returned to the United States in 1892 to continue boxing. On 6 February 1892, he was knocked out by Johnny Griffith in a 122 pound Featherweight Title match in Brooklyn, New York. Both boxers complained of injuries to their hands, not uncommon considering the thin gloves used in most bouts.

On 31 May 1892, he fought Johnny Murphy in San Francisco in a forty round no contest bout that was billed as a 122 pound World Championship. On 28 December 1892, in San Francisco, he had a rematch with Tommy White, whom he had defeated two years earlier, that ended in an epic thirty-four round no contest. The bout was for a $2,500 purse. In the fifteenth, White lost his momentum and was dropped by Murphy in the following round. From the seventeenth, to the twenty-ninth little fighting was done, both boxers to exhausted or disinclined to give or receive much punishment. The referee said he would allow four more rounds, but stopped the fight on the thirty-fourth as there was too little boxing taking place. No blows were landed in the last eleven rounds, and some in the crowd suspected the fight was fixed. All betting was declared off by the third round by the referee.

In an unusual match on 16 December 1893, in Paterson, New Jersey, with George Dixon, Murphy was disqualified in the third round for a blow to the referee. Dixon had the best of the first round. Trying to break the fighters from clinching in the third round, Murphy hit Referee James Stoddard with a right in the face either accidentally or distracted by the heat of the moment, and infuriated, Stoddard retaliated with two quick blows that landed Murphy under the ropes. The house became wild, but the police managed to keep order. Some papers described the fight as a knockout, though the referee, not Dixon put Murphy on the mat.

=== Losses to champions Dixon, Santry, Forbes, and Harris ===
He fought George Dixon on 22 January 1897 at the Broadway Athletic Club in Brooklyn, losing in a six round knockout. The fight was billed as a 120 pound World Featherweight Title match. Manager Sam Fitzpatrick had predicted that Dixon would have the edge in the bout. As the bout was with a former World Champion, it attracted considerable interest, and Dixon led the betting by odds of 2 to 1. Murphy held his own for the first three rounds, but looked fatigued by the last three, while Dixon remained fresh and unfazed by the blows of Murphy. Murphy was knocked down and out in the sixth by a strong left to the stomach.

On 26 November 1898, he was knocked out by a rising Chicago star, Eddie Santry, who would take the World Featherweight Championship, according to most sources, the following year against English boxer Ben Jordan. Murphy's knockout loss to Santry took place in the fourth round at the Commercial Athletic Club in St. Louis, Missouri.

On 29 April 1899, he lost in a four round knockout to future World Bantamweight Champion Harry Forbes at the Chicago Athletic Association in Chicago, Illinois. On 19 May 1899, he lost to 1901 World Bantamweight Champion Harry Harris in a fourth round knockout at the Star Theatre in Chicago.

== Return to Australia in 1904 ==
In 1904, he returned to Australia and continued his boxing career, fighting around fifteen additional bouts. His last battle was with Jimmy Ross in Auckland in 1906.

He died at his home in Auckland, New Zealand, on 26 July 1939 at the age of 75.

== Recognition ==
Murphy was inducted into the New Zealand Sports Hall of Fame in 1990.

== Professional boxing record ==
All information in this section is derived from BoxRec, unless otherwise stated.

=== Official record ===
221 fights	90 wins	51 losses
By knockout	76	30
By decision	12	13
By disqualification	2	8
Draws	24	
No contests	31	
Newspaper decisions/draws	25	

All newspaper decisions are officially regarded as “no decision” bouts and are not counted in the win/loss/draw column.

No.	Result	Record	Opponent	Type	Round	Date	Location	Notes
221	ND	90–51–24 (56)	J Young	ND	3	May 8, 1911	His Majestys Theatre, Auckland, New Zealand	
220	Draw	90–51–24 (55)	Jimmy Ross	PTS	4	Aug 24, 1907	His Majestys Theatre, Auckland, New Zealand	
219	Loss	90–51–23 (55)	Jim Fairlie Morris	KO	3 (15)	Oct 29, 1907	Show Grounds, Palmerston North, New Zealand	
218	Win	90–50–23 (55)	Tom Toohey	KO	1 (15)	Aug 8, 1907	Theatre Royal, New Plymouth, New Zealand	Won vacant New Zealand Boxing Association featherweight title
217	ND	89–50–23 (55)	Lovegrove	ND	2 (3)	Aug 8, 1907	Theatre Royal, New Plymouth, New Zealand	
216	Win	89–50–23 (54)	Jack Griffin	PTS	8	Jun 3, 1907	Showgrounds, Hastings, New Zealand	
215	Draw	88–50–23 (54)	Jimmy Ross	PTS	4	Apr 28, 1906	Mansfield's Rooms, Auckland, New Zealand	
214	Loss	88–50–22 (54)	Tim Tracey	KO	5 (15)	Dec 20, 1905	Town Hall, Stratford, New Zealand	
213	Loss	88–49–22 (54)	Jack Clarke	TKO	5 (6)	Jul 21, 1905	Theatre Royal, Wellington, New Zealand	
212	Win	88–48–22 (54)	Walter Doman	KO	1 (6)	Apr 14, 1905	Masonic Hall, Stratford, New Zealand	
211	ND	87–48–22 (54)	Launcy	ND	4	Mar 6, 1905	Town Hall, Inglewood, New Zealand	
210	ND	87–48–22 (53)	Tom Toohey	ND	4	Mar 6, 1905	Town Hall, Inglewood, New Zealand	
209	ND	87–48–22 (52)	Charlie Cameron	ND	6	Feb 9, 1905	Town Hall, Midhirst, New Zealand	
208	ND	87–48–22 (51)	Tommy Kee	ND	6	Feb 9, 1905	Town Hall, Midhirst, New Zealand	
207	ND	87–48–22 (50)	Local Amateur	ND	6	Jan 11, 1905	Theatre Royal, New Plymouth, New Zealand	
206	ND	87–48–22 (49)	Teddy Green	ND	3	Oct 21, 1904	Gaiety Athletic Hall, Sydney, New South Wales, Australia	
205	Loss	87–48–22 (48)	Peter Toohey	KO	2 (20)	Sep 13, 1904	NSC, Sydney, New South Wales, Australia	
204	Loss	87–47–22 (48)	Tim Hegarty	KO	3 (20)	Aug 2, 1904	NSC, Sydney, New South Wales, Australia	
203	Draw	87–46–22 (48)	Jack Evans	PTS	6	Dec 29, 1903	Mechanic's Pavilion, San Francisco, California, U.S.	
202	Win	87–46–21 (48)	Teddy Peppers	DQ	2 (10)	Oct 8, 1903	Kansas City, Missouri, U.S.	
201	Loss	86–46–21 (48)	Pat Hogan	PTS	10	Oct 1, 1902	United States of America	Date and location uncertain
200	Win	86–45–21 (48)	Dave Donovan	KO	2 (10)	Sep 7, 1902	Sioux City A.C., Sioux City, Iowa, U.S.	
199	Win	85–45–21 (48)	Johnny Van Heest	KO	4 (10)	Aug 3, 1902	Sioux City A.C., Sioux City, Iowa, U.S.	
198	Loss	84–45–21 (48)	Clarence English	KO	3 (10)	Apr 3, 1902	Carroll, Iowa, U.S.	
197	Win	84–44–21 (48)	Bert Cassell	KO	4 (10)	Jan 12, 1902	O'Neill, Nebraska, U.S.	
196	Loss	83–44–21 (48)	Haich Smith	KO	1 (15)	Sep 13, 1900	Washington Hall, Omaha, Nebraska, U.S.	
195	Loss	83–43–21 (48)	Larry Gleason	RTD	6 (15)	Nov 14, 1899	Grand Opera House, Sioux City, Iowa, U.S.	Murphy broke his arm and had to retire
194	Draw	83–42–21 (48)	Sig Hart	PTS	20	Oct 20, 1899	Sioux City A.C., Sioux City, Iowa, U.S.	
193	Loss	83–42–20 (48)	Sig Hart	PTS	15	Sep 14, 1899	Sioux City A.C., Sioux City, Iowa, U.S.	
192	NC	83–41–20 (48)	Patsy Magner	NC	2 (15)	Aug 11, 1899	Sioux City A.C., Sioux City, Iowa, U.S.	
191	Loss	83–41–20 (47)	Harry Harris	KO	4 (6)	May 19, 1899	Star Theatre, Chicago, Illinois, U.S.	
190	Loss	83–40–20 (47)	Harry Forbes	KO	4 (?)	Apr 29, 1899	Chicago A.A., Chicago, Illinois, U.S.	
189	Draw	83–39–20 (47)	Frank Stackhouse	PTS	8	Apr 11, 1899	Dayton, Ohio, U.S.	
188	Loss	83–39–19 (47)	Kid Moore	PTS	15	Apr 1, 1899	Mansfield, Ohio, U.S.	Date uncertain
187	Loss	83–38–19 (47)	Johnny Van Heest	TKO	6 (10)	Mar 7, 1899	Dayton, Ohio, U.S.	
186	Win	83–37–19 (47)	Walter Burbeck	KO	2 (?)	Feb 15, 1899	Springfield A.C., Springfield, Ohio, U.S.	
185	Loss	82–37–19 (47)	Casper Leon	PTS	10	Jan 16, 1899	Peerless A.C., Cincinnati, Ohio, U.S.	
184	Loss	82–36–19 (47)	Eddie Santry	KO	4 (20)	Nov 26, 1898	Commercial A.C., Saint Louis, Missouri, U.S.	
183	Loss	82–35–19 (47)	Jimmy Reeder	KO	4 (?)	Apr 28, 1898	Mountain City Theatre, Altoona, Pennsylvania, U.S.	
182	Loss	82–34–19 (47)	Yock Henniger	DQ	4 (?)	Apr 12, 1898	Metropolitan Club, Pittsburgh, Pennsylvania, U.S.	
181	ND	82–33–19 (47)	Bill Baxter Junior	ND	4	Mar 9, 1898	Excelsior Hall, Bethnal Green, London, England	
180	Loss	82–33–19 (46)	Will Curley	KO	12 (20)	Feb 25, 1898	Ginnetts Circus, Newcastle, Tyne and Wear, England	
179	ND	82–32–19 (46)	Young Charlie White	ND	3	Jan 17, 1898	Paddington Baths, Queen's Road, Bayswater, London, England	
178	ND	82–32–19 (45)	Bill Wood	ND	3	Nov 1, 1897	National Sporting Club, Covent Garden, London, England	Trial bout
177	Win	82–32–19 (44)	Ellwood McCloskey	NWS	6	Sep 13, 1897	Quaker City A.C., Philadelphia, Pennsylvania, U.S.	
176	Draw	82–32–19 (43)	Billy Rotchford	PTS	3 (20)	Jul 19, 1897	Albany, New York, U.S.	The police intervened
175	Loss	82–32–18 (43)	Oscar Gardner	PTS	20	Apr 10, 1897	Polo A.C., New York City, New York, U.S.	
174	Draw	82–31–18 (43)	Austin Rice	PTS	20	Mar 13, 1897	Polo A.C., New York City, New York, U.S.	
173	Win	82–31–17 (43)	Bill Barbeck	KO	2 (?)	Feb 15, 1897	Dayton, Ohio, U.S.	
172	Loss	81–31–17 (43)	Danny McMahon	NWS	6	Feb 8, 1897	Quaker City A.C., Philadelphia, Pennsylvania, U.S.	
171	Draw	81–31–17 (42)	Dave Wall	PTS	10	Feb 6, 1897	Polo A.C., New York City, New York, U.S.	
170	Loss	81–31–16 (42)	Jack Delaney	KO	5 (15)	Jan 30, 1897	Polo A.C., New York City, New York, U.S.	Not to be confused with Jack Delaney
169	Loss	81–30–16 (42)	George Dixon	KO	6 (20)	Jan 22, 1897	Broadway A.C., Brooklyn, New York City, New York, U.S.	For world featherweight title
168	Draw	81–29–16 (42)	Johnny Lavack	PTS	20	Oct 8, 1896	Lexington Opera House, Lexington, Kentucky, U.S.	
167	Win	81–29–15 (42)	Jim Conners	KO	4 (?)	Apr 29, 1896	Jackson, Mississippi, U.S.	
166	Win	80–29–15 (42)	Paddy Smith	PTS	10	Mar 17, 1896	Olympic A.C., Cincinnati, Ohio, U.S.	
165	Draw	79–29–15 (42)	Jimmy Devers	PTS	10	Feb 11, 1896	Opera House, Jackson, Mississippi, U.S.	
164	Loss	79–29–14 (42)	Solly Smith	TKO	14 (20)	Dec 23, 1895	Olympic Club, New Orleans, Louisiana, U.S.	Police intervened
163	Win	79–28–14 (42)	Jack Dougherty	PTS	10	Nov 13, 1895	Opera House, Lexington, Kentucky, U.S.	
162	Win	78–28–14 (42)	Billy Sheldon	KO	3 (?)	Aug 22, 1895	Louisville, Kentucky, U.S.	
161	Win	77–28–14 (42)	Billy Sheldon	TKO	5 (15)	Aug 6, 1895	National Park, Louisville, Kentucky, U.S.	Police stopped the bout while Sheldon was basically out
160	Draw	76–28–14 (42)	Tommy White	PTS	20	Jul 11, 1895	Grand Opera House, Columbus, Ohio, U.S.	
159	Win	76–28–13 (42)	Jack Dougherty	KO	6 (10)	May 30, 1895	Olympic A.C., Cincinnati, Ohio, U.S.	
158	Draw	75–28–13 (42)	Jack Dougherty	PTS	10	May 6, 1895	Fair Play AC, Cincinnati, Ohio, U.S.	
157	Loss	75–28–12 (42)	Tommy Hogan	PTS	10	Feb 26, 1895	Olympic A.C., Cincinnati, Ohio, U.S.	
156	Win	75–27–12 (42)	Kid McGraw	KO	4 (?)	Feb 5, 1895	Olympic A.C., Cincinnati, Ohio, U.S.	
155	Win	74–27–12 (42)	Frank McCloskey	TKO	9 (10)	Jan 3, 1895	Olympic A.C., Cincinnati, Ohio, U.S.	
154	Win	73–27–12 (42)	Kentucky Rosebud	NWS	4	Dec 8, 1894	Southwark A.C., Philadelphia, Pennsylvania, U.S.	
153	Draw	73–27–12 (41)	Jerry Barnett	PTS	10	Nov 19, 1894	Atlantic A.C., Brooklyn, New York City, New York, U.S.	
152	Win	73–27–11 (41)	Kid Lafeber	KO	2 (?)	Nov 12, 1894	Cincinnati, Ohio, U.S.	
151	Win	72–27–11 (41)	Jack McCabe	KO	2 (?)	Nov 6, 1894	People's Theater, Cincinnati, Ohio, U.S.	
150	Loss	71–27–11 (41)	Young Griffo	PTS	8	May 7, 1894	Casino, Boston, Massachusetts, U.S.	
149	Win	71–26–11 (41)	Peter Manning	KO	4 (?)	Apr 23, 1894	Casino, Boston, Massachusetts, U.S.	
148	Win	70–26–11 (41)	Johnny Breslin	KO	2 (?)	Feb 19, 1894	Lafayette A.C., Boston, Massachusetts, U.S.	
147	Win	69–26–11 (41)	Jack Woods	TKO	2 (?)	Dec 22, 1893	American A.C., Boston, Massachusetts, U.S.	
146	Loss	68–26–11 (41)	George Dixon	DQ	3 (?)	Dec 15, 1893	People's Theater, Paterson, New Jersey, U.S.	
145	Loss	68–25–11 (41)	Ed Gorman	KO	9 (?)	Nov 7, 1893	Grand Opera House, Rock Springs, Wyoming, U.S.	
144	Loss	68–24–11 (41)	Ike Weir	KO	6 (?)	Nov 2, 1893	Cribb Club, Boston, Massachusetts, U.S.	
143	Win	68–23–11 (41)	Jack Collins	KO	2 (?)	Sep 23, 1893	Union A.C., Brooklyn, New York City, New York, U.S.	
142	Win	67–23–11 (41)	Jack Grace	TKO	3 (?)	Sep 22, 1893	Clermont Avenue Rink, Brooklyn, New York City, New York, U.S.	
141	Draw	66–23–11 (41)	Jack Downey	PTS	4	Aug 31, 1893	Passaic A.C., Passaic, New Jersey, U.S.	
140	Draw	66–23–10 (41)	Dick Listman	PTS	4	Jul 17, 1893	Newark, New Jersey, U.S.	
139	Loss	66–23–9 (41)	Jerry Barnett	NWS	4	May 30, 1893	Philadelphia A.C., Philadelphia, Pennsylvania, U.S.	
138	Loss	66–23–9 (40)	Jerry Barnett	PTS	4	Apr 29, 1893	Madison Square Garden, New York City, New York, U.S.	
137	Loss	66–22–9 (40)	Johnny Griffin	KO	7 (20)	Feb 6, 1893	Coney Island A.C., Brooklyn, New York City, New York, U.S.	Lost world 122lbs featherweight title claim
136	NC	66–21–9 (40)	Tommy White	NC	34 (?)	Dec 28, 1892	Pacific A.C., San Francisco	
135	Loss	66–21–9 (39)	Tommy Spider Kelly	PTS	6	Jul 25, 1892	New York City, New York, U.S.	
134	NC	66–20–9 (39)	Johnny Murphy	NC	40 (?)	May 31, 1892	Pacific A.C., San Francisco, California, U.S.	Billed world 122lbs title
133	Loss	66–20–9 (38)	Jim Barron	KO	3 (20)	Feb 16, 1892	Golden Gate A.C., Sydney, New South Wales, Australia	
132	Win	66–19–9 (38)	George Powell	NWS	4	Dec 29, 1891	Olympic Hall, Newcastle, New South Wales, Australia	
131	Win	66–19–9 (37)	Chris Cunningham	KO	3 (4)	Dec 26, 1891	Olympic Hall, Newcastle, New South Wales, Australia	
130	Win	65–19–9 (37)	George Powell	NWS	4	Dec 26, 1891	Olympic Hall, Newcastle, New South Wales, Australia	
129	NC	65–19–9 (36)	Jim Burge	NC	29 (30)	Nov 23, 1891	Sydney Amateur Gymnastic Club, Sydney, New South Wales, Australia	
128	Win	65–19–9 (35)	Bill Jennings	KO	2 (20)	Oct 19, 1891	Sydney Amateur Gymnastic Club, Sydney, New South Wales, Australia	
127	Loss	64–19–9 (35)	Young Griffo	DQ	22 (30)	Jul 22, 1891	Sydney Amateur Gymnastic Club, Sydney, New South Wales, Australia	For world featherweight title
126	Loss	64–18–9 (35)	Artie Tully	PTS	8	May 4, 1891	Crystal Palace, Richmond, Melbourne, Victoria, Australia	
125	Win	64–17–9 (35)	Nipper Peakes	KO	6 (?)	Mar 23, 1891	O'Bierne's Athletic Hall, Broken Hill, New South Wales, Australia	
124	Loss	63–17–9 (35)	Jim Burge	KO	30 (40)	Jan 19, 1891	O'Bierne's Athletic Hall, Broken Hill, New South Wales, Australia	
123	Win	63–16–9 (35)	Pat Carroll	KO	4 (20)	Dec 8, 1890	O'Bierne's Athletic Hall, Broken Hill, New South Wales, Australia	
122	Win	62–16–9 (35)	Jack Krosen	PTS	8	Nov 11, 1890	Apollo Athletic Hall, Melbourne, Victoria, Australia	
121	Win	62–16–9 (34)	Harry Dummy Mace	PTS	8	Nov 10, 1890	Crystal Palace, Richmond, Melbourne	
120	Draw	61–16–9 (34)	Nipper Peakes	PTS	10	Oct 25, 1890	Crystal Palace, Richmond, Melbourne	
119	Win	61–16–8 (34)	Jack Krosen	NWS	4	Sep 29, 1890	Crystal Palace, Richmond, Melbourne, Victoria, Australia	
118	Loss	61–16–8 (33)	Young Griffo	RTD	15 (?)	Sep 2, 1890	Sydney Amateur Gymnastic Club, Sydney, New South Wales, Australia	Lost world featherweight title; Murphy continued to claim the title even after this loss for the championship
117	Win	61–15–8 (33)	Eddie Greaney	PTS	4	May 29, 1890	California A.C., San Francisco, California, U.S	
116	Win	60–15–8 (33)	Tommy White	NWS	4	Apr 21, 1890	Madison Street Theatre, Chicago, Illinois, U.S	
115	Win	60–15–8 (32)	Tommy Warren	KO	4 (?)	Mar 14, 1890	California A.C., San Francisco, California, U.S	Retained world featherweight title; A finish fight
114	Win	59–15–8 (32)	Ike Weir	KO	14 (30)	Jan 13, 1890	California A.C., San Francisco, California, U.S	Won world featherweight title
113	Draw	58–15–8 (32)	Frank Murphy	PTS	27 (?)	Jul 30, 1889	California A.C., San Francisco, California, U.S	Police intervened
112	Win	58–15–7 (32)	Johnny Griffin	KO	3 (?)	Jul 12, 1889	California A.C., San Francisco, California, U.S.	A finish fight
111	Win	57–15–7 (32)	John Simon	KO	1 (4)	May 18, 1889	Waite's Hall, Mt Eden, Auckland, New Zealand	
110	Win	56–15–7 (32)	William Tracey	PTS	8	Mar 16, 1889	Princess Theatre, Dunedin, New Zealand	
109	Win	55–15–7 (32)	Warren	KO	6 (10)	Mar 16, 1889	Princess Theatre, Dunedin, New Zealand	
108	Win	54–15–7 (32)	James Smith	KO	8 (10)	Mar 4, 1889	Princess Theatre, Dunedin, New Zealand	
107	Loss	53–15–7 (32)	Tommy Williams	DQ	4 (?)	Feb 2, 1889	Princess Theatre, Dunedin, New Zealand	
106	Loss	53–14–7 (32)	Young Griffo	PTS	4	Dec 10, 1888	Apollo Athletic Hall, Melbourne, Victoria, Australia	
105	Loss	53–13–7 (32)	Ben Seth	KO	6 (8)	Nov 26, 1888	Apollo Athletic Hall, Melbourne, Victoria, Australia	
104	Win	53–12–7 (32)	Jerry Marshall	KO	1 (8)	Oct 27, 1888	Apollo Athletic Hall, Melbourne, Victoria, Australia	
103	Draw	52–12–7 (32)	Jack Hall	PTS	8	Sep 29, 1888	Apollo Athletic Hall, Melbourne, Victoria, Australia	
102	Win	52–12–6 (32)	Jim Saxon	KO	4 (?)	Sep 1, 1888	Foley's Hall, Sydney, New Wales, Australia	
101	Win	51–12–6 (32)	Billy Baster	KO	3 (4)	Aug 1, 1888	Princess Theatre, Dunedin, New Zealand	
100	Win	50–12–6 (32)	John Scotty Faddes	KO	3 (4)	Jul 28, 1888	Princess Theatre, Dunedin, New Zealand	
99	Win	49–12–6 (32)	Edward Jones	KO	5 (?)	Jul 1, 1888	Sloan's Theatre, Invercargill, New Zealand	
98	Win	48–12–6 (32)	Joe Molloy	KO	5 (?)	Jun 23, 1888	Princess Theatre, Dunedin, New Zealand	
97	Loss	47–12–6 (32)	Frank Newton	DQ	3 (4)	May 24, 1888	Theatre Royal, Napier, New Zealand	
96	Win	47–11–6 (32)	Harry Brown	KO	3 (6)	May 5, 1888	Flint's Hall, Wairoa, New Zealand	
95	Win	46–11–6 (32)	William Edwards	KO	3 (4)	Apr 28, 1888	Theatre Royal, Gisborne, New Zealand	
94	Win	45–11–6 (32)	Frank Newton	TKO	4 (4)	Apr 14, 1888	Theatre Royal, Napier, New Zealand	
93	Win	44–11–6 (32)	Tony Hogan	TKO	7 (?)	Feb 4, 1888	Gaiety Theatre, Napier, New Zealand	
92	Win	43–11–6 (32)	Jim Mitchell	NWS	4	Feb 4, 1888	Gaiety Theatre, Napier, New Zealand	
91	Win	43–11–6 (31)	James Mannix	TKO	3 (?)	Jan 28, 1888	Gaiety Theatre, Napier, New Zealand	
90	Win	42–11–6 (31)	Jerry Ford	KO	11 (?)	Jan 12, 1888	Princess Theatre, Wellington, New Zealand	
89	Win	41–11–6 (31)	Roy Brooks	KO	1 (4)	Jan 9, 1888	Princess Theatre, Wellington, New Zealand	
88	Win	40–11–6 (31)	Ed Parker	KO	3 (4)	Jan 9, 1888	Princess Theatre, Wellington, New Zealand	
87	Loss	39–11–6 (31)	Jack Hall	DQ	6 (?)	Dec 23, 1887	Princess Theatre, Wellington, New Zealand	
86	Loss	39–10–6 (31)	Ike Fake	DQ	6 (?)	Nov 24, 1887	Volunteer Drill Shed, Wellington, New Zealand	
85	Win	39–9–6 (31)	A 13 Stone Maori	KO	?	Oct 4, 1887	Gaiety Theatre, Napier, New Zealand	
84	Win	38–9–6 (31)	Ike Fake	TKO	3 (?)	Sep 12, 1887	Opera House, Wellington, New Zealand	
83	ND	37–9–6 (31)	Ed Brooks	ND	3	Aug 27, 1887	Oddfellow's Hall, Christchurch, New Zealand	
82	Win	37–9–6 (30)	John Scotty Faddes	KO	2 (?)	Aug 20, 1887	Princess Theatre, Dunedin, New Zealand	
81	Win	36–9–6 (30)	Bill Mitchell	KO	4 (?)	Aug 13, 1887	Princess Theatre, Dunedin, New Zealand	
80	Win	35–9–6 (30)	Ed Burgess	KO	4 (?)	Aug 10, 1887	Princess Theatre, Dunedin, New Zealand	
79	ND	34–9–6 (30)	Ed Brooks	ND	3	Aug 3, 1887	Public Hall, Oamaru, New Zealand	
78	Win	34–9–6 (29)	Fred Bruce	KO	7 (?)	Jul 28, 1887	Odd Fellows Hall, Christchurch, New Zealand	
77	Win	33–9–6 (29)	Richard Allen	KO	7 (?)	Jul 26, 1887	Opera House, Wellington, New Zealand	
76	Win	32–9–6 (29)	Local Amateur	NWS	4	Jun 28, 1887	Volunteer Drill Shed, Wellington, New Zealand	
75	Loss	32–9–6 (28)	Harry Laing	KO	3 (4)	Jun 6, 1887	Princess Theatre, Wanganui, New Zealand	
74	Win	32–8–6 (28)	Nat Brooks	KO	9 (?)	May 21, 1887	Volunteer Drill Shed, Wellington, New Zealand	A finish fight
73	Win	31–8–6 (28)	Charlie Taylor	KO	12 (?)	Apr 27, 1887	Agricultural Hall, Auckland, New Zealand	A finish fight
72	Win	30–8–6 (28)	Jim Saxon	NWS	6	Apr 9, 1887	Agricultural Hall, Auckland, New Zealand	
71	Loss	30–8–6 (27)	Young Mitchell	TKO	5 (?)	Mar 14, 1887	Foley's Hall, Sydney, New South Wales, Australia	A finish fight
70	Win	30–7–6 (27)	Will Brummy Fuller	KO	13 (?)	Feb 23, 1887	Foley's Hall, Sydney, New South Wales, Australia	A finish fight
69	Draw	29–7–6 (27)	Bill Burgess	PTS	36 (?)	Feb 19, 1887	Foley's Hall, Sydney, New South Wales, Australia	
68	ND	29–7–5 (27)	Bill Burgess	ND	4	Feb 15, 1887	Foley's Hall, Sydney, New South Wales, Australia	
67	Draw	29–7–5 (26)	Young Aitken	PTS	4	Feb 12, 1887	Foley's Hall, Sydney, New South Wales, Australia	
66	Win	29–7–5 (25)	George Mullholland	PTS	4	Feb 5, 1887	Foley's Hall, Sydney, New South Wales, Australia	
65	Win	28–7–5 (25)	Billy Williams	NWS	4	Jan 31, 1887	Parramatta, Sydney, New South Wales, Australia	
64	Win	28–7–5 (24)	J Pennington	KO	3 (?)	Jan 26, 1887	Parramatta, Sydney, New South Wales, Australia	
63	Win	27–7–5 (24)	Sam Stewart	KO	18 (?)	Jan 24, 1887	Foley's Hall, Sydney, New South Wales, Australia	
62	Draw	26–7–5 (24)	Stevens	NWS	4	Jan 22, 1887	Foley's Hall, Sydney, New South Wales, Australia	
61	ND	26–7–5 (23)	Stevens	ND	4	Jan 15, 1887	Foley's Hall, Sydney, New South Wales, Australia	
60	Draw	26–7–5 (22)	Jack Fuller	NWS	4	Jan 8, 1887	Foley's Hall, Sydney, New South Wales, Australia	
59	Win	26–7–5 (21)	Bill Scott	KO	2 (?)	Dec 1, 1886	Foley's Hall, Sydney, New South Wales, Australia	
58	ND	25–7–5 (21)	Willie Brummer Fuller	ND	4	Nov 27, 1886	Foley's Hall, Sydney, New South Wales, Australia	
57	ND	25–7–5 (20)	George Mullholland	ND	4	Nov 13, 1886	Foley's Hall, Sydney, New South Wales, Australia	
56	Win	25–7–5 (19)	Frisco McCaull	KO	2 (?)	Nov 6, 1886	Foley's Hall, Sydney, New South Wales, Australia	
55	Win	24–7–5 (19)	Jack Fuller	NWS	4	Oct 30, 1886	Foley's Hall, Sydney, New South Wales, Australia	
54	ND	24–7–5 (18)	Jim O'Brien	ND	4	Oct 23, 1886	Foley's Hall, Sydney, New South Wales, Australia	
53	Win	24–7–5 (17)	Willie Brummer Fuller	KO	14 (?)	Oct 4, 1886	Foley's Hall, Sydney, New South Wales, Australia	
52	ND	23–7–5 (17)	Willie Brummer Fuller	ND	4	Oct 2, 1886	Foley's Hall, Sydney, New South Wales, Australia	
51	ND	23–7–5 (16)	Willie Brummer Fuller	ND	4	Sep 18, 1886	Foley's Hall, Sydney, New South Wales, Australia	
50	ND	23–7–5 (15)	Kelly	ND	4	Sep 11, 1886	Foley's Hall, Sydney, New South Wales, Australia	
49	Win	23–7–5 (14)	Will Brummy Fuller	NWS	4	Sep 4, 1886	Foley's Hall, Sydney, New South Wales, Australia	
48	Win	23–7–5 (13)	Will Brummy Fuller	PTS	4	Aug 28, 1886	Foley's Hall, Sydney, New South Wales, Australia	
47	ND	22–7–5 (13)	Will Brummy Fuller	ND	4	Aug 25, 1886	Foley's Hall, Sydney, New South Wales, Australia	
46	Draw	22–7–5 (12)	Sam Stewart	NWS	4	Aug 21, 1886	Foley's Hall, Sydney, New South Wales, Australia	
45	Win	22–7–5 (11)	Bill Burgess	PTS	4	Jul 10, 1886	Foley's Hall, Sydney, New South Wales, Australia	
44	Win	21–7–5 (11)	Will Brummy Fuller	NWS	4	Jul 10, 1886	Foley's Hall, Sydney, New South Wales, Australia	
43	Win	21–7–5 (10)	Richard Deerfoot Rose	KO	5 (?)	Jun 26, 1886	Foley's Hall, Sydney, New South Wales, Australia	A finish fight
42	Draw	20–7–5 (10)	Richard Deerfoot Rose	NWS	4	Jun 19, 1886	Foley's Hall, Sydney, New South Wales, Australia	
41	Win	20–7–5 (9)	Bert Johnstone	RTD	3 (4)	Jun 5, 1886	Foley's Hall, Sydney, New South Wales, Australia	
40	Win	19–7–5 (9)	Richard Deerfoot Rose	NWS	4	May 29, 1886	Foley's Hall, Sydney, New South Wales, Australia	
39	Draw	19–7–5 (8)	Nipper Peakes	PTS	17 (?)	May 17, 1886	Foley's Hall, Sydney, New South Wales, Australia	
38	Loss	19–7–4 (8)	Jack Hall	RTD	2 (4)	May 8, 1886	Foley's Hall, Sydney, New South Wales, Australia	
37	Win	19–6–4 (8)	Davis	NWS	4	May 1, 1886	Foley's Hall, Sydney, New South Wales, Australia	
36	Win	19–6–4 (7)	Frank King	KO	1 (?)	Mar 27, 1886	Masonic Temple, Sydney, New South Wales, Australia	
35	Draw	18–6–4 (7)	Unknown Walter	NWS	6	Mar 20, 1886	Foley's Hall, Sydney, New South Wales, Australia	
34	Loss	18–6–4 (6)	Jack Hall	RTD	1 (4)	Mar 13, 1886	Foley's Hall, Sydney, New South Wales, Australia	
33	Win	18–5–4 (6)	Walter	NWS	4	Feb 13, 1886	Foley's Hall, Sydney, New South Wales, Australia	
32	Win	18–5–4 (5)	Hobart Jack Gallagher	DQ	12 (?)	Jan 2, 1886	Lorne Street Hall, Auckland, New Zealand	
31	Win	17–5–4 (5)	Johnny The Stranger	KO	8 (?)	Dec 23, 1885	Public Hall, Onehunga, New Zealand	
30	Win	16–5–4 (5)	Jack Nicholson	KO	4 (?)	Dec 5, 1885	Lorne Street Hall, Auckland, New Zealand	
29	Win	15–5–4 (5)	Andy Dawson	KO	2 (?)	Oct 31, 1885	Lorne Street Hall, Auckland, New Zealand	
28	Draw	14–5–4 (5)	Dick Sandall	PTS	3	Oct 5, 1885	Lorne Street Hall, Auckland, New Zealand	
27	Draw	14–5–3 (5)	Richard Deerfoot Rose	PTS	6	Sep 21, 1885	Cook Street Hall, Auckland, New Zealand	
26	Draw	14–5–2 (5)	William Burns	PTS	4	Aug 29, 1885	Lorne Street Hall, Auckland, New Zealand	
25	ND	14–5–1 (5)	Local Amateur	ND	2 (?)	Aug 29, 1885	Lorne Street Hall, Auckland, New Zealand	
24	ND	14–5–1 (4)	Richard Deerfoot Rose	ND	4	Aug 19, 1885	Lorne Street Hall, Auckland, New Zealand	
23	Loss	14–5–1 (3)	Barney Donovan	TKO	9 (?)	Apr 25, 1885	Theatre Royal, Auckland, New Zealand	
22	Win	14–4–1 (3)	Charlie Carter	KO	3 (?)	Mar 14, 1885	Academy of Music, Thames, New Zealand	
21	Win	13–4–1 (3)	Wal Burton	KO	4 (?)	Feb 7, 1885	Academy of Music, Thames, New Zealand	
20	Loss	12–4–1 (3)	Barney Donovan	TKO	7 (?)	Jan 5, 1885	Theatre Royal, Auckland, New Zealand	
19	ND	12–3–1 (3)	Richard Deerfoot Rose	ND	4	Jan 5, 1885	Theatre Royal, Auckland, New Zealand	
18	Win	12–3–1 (2)	Jim Gardiner	KO	3 (?)	Aug 1, 1884	Auckland, New Zealand	
17	Win	11–3–1 (2)	Walter Evans	KO	3 (?)	Jul 1, 1884	Auckland, New Zealand	
16	Win	10–3–1 (2)	Joe Guller	KO	2 (?)	Jun 1, 1884	New Zealand	
15	Win	9–3–1 (2)	Harry Eccles	KO	2 (?)	May 24, 1884	Theatre Royal, Auckland, New Zealand	
14	ND	8–3–1 (2)	Local Amateur	ND	4	Mar 22, 1884	Theatre Royal, Auckland, New Zealand	
13	Win	8–3–1 (1)	Tony Hogan	KO	3 (?)	Mar 15, 1884	Theatre Royal, Auckland, New Zealand	
12	Loss	7–3–1 (1)	Tony Hogan	DQ	3 (?)	Feb 4, 1884	Theatre Royal, Auckland, New Zealand	
11	Win	7–2–1 (1)	Mick O'Brien	KO	4 (?)	Jan 9, 1884	Theatre Royal, Auckland, New Zealand	
10	Win	6–2–1 (1)	Frank Burns	KO	25 (?)	Jul 14, 1883	Lorne Street Hall, Auckland, New Zealand	
9	ND	5–2–1 (1)	Green	ND	4	Jun 9, 1883	Lorne Street Hall, Auckland, New Zealand	
8	Win	5–2–1	William Burns	PTS	4	Dec 4, 1882	Theatre Royal, Auckland, New Zealand	
7	Win	4–2–1	Billy Dawson	KO	1 (?)	May 7, 1882	Auckland Domain, Auckland	
6	Draw	3–2–1	Micky Kirby	PTS	4	May 5, 1882	Theatre Royal, Auckland, New Zealand	
5	Loss	3–2	Hill	PTS	4	May 5, 1882	Theatre Royal, Auckland, New Zealand	
4	Win	3–1	Sammy Heckles	KO	2 (4)	May 2, 1882	Theatre Royal, Auckland, New Zealand	
3	Win	2–1	Banks	PTS	4	Apr 15, 1882	Lorne Street Hall, Auckland, New Zealand	
2	Loss	1–1	Barney Donovan	PTS	4	Apr 15, 1882	Lorne Street Hall, Auckland, New Zealand	
1	Win	1–0	Morris	PTS	4	Apr 11, 1882	Lorne Street Hall, Auckland, New Zealand	

=== Unofficial record ===
221 fights	107 wins	53 losses
By knockout	76	30
By decision	29	15
By disqualification	2	8
Draws	30	
No contests	31	

Record with the inclusion of newspaper decisions in the win/loss/draw column.

No.	Result	Record	Opponent	Type	Round	Date	Location	Notes
221	ND	107–53–30 (31)	J Young	ND	3	May 8, 1911	His Majestys Theatre, Auckland, New Zealand	
220	Draw	107–53–30 (30)	Jimmy Ross	PTS	4	Aug 24, 1907	His Majestys Theatre, Auckland, New Zealand	
219	Loss	107–53–29 (30)	Jim Fairlie Morris	KO	3 (15)	Oct 29, 1907	Show Grounds, Palmerston North, New Zealand	
218	Win	107–52–29 (30)	Tom Toohey	KO	1 (15)	Aug 8, 1907	Theatre Royal, New Plymouth, New Zealand	Won vacant New Zealand Boxing Association featherweight title
217	NC	106–52–29 (30)	Lovegrove	NC	2 (3)	Aug 8, 1907	Theatre Royal, New Plymouth, New Zealand	
216	Win	106–52–29 (29)	Jack Griffin	PTS	8	Jun 3, 1907	Showgrounds, Hastings, New Zealand	
215	Draw	105–52–29 (29)	Jimmy Ross	PTS	4	Apr 28, 1906	Mansfield's Rooms, Auckland, New Zealand	
214	Loss	105–52–28 (29)	Tim Tracey	KO	5 (15)	Dec 20, 1905	Town Hall, Stratford, New Zealand	
213	Loss	105–51–28 (29)	Jack Clarke	TKO	5 (6)	Jul 21, 1905	Theatre Royal, Wellington, New Zealand	
212	Win	105–50–28 (29)	Walter Doman	KO	1 (6)	Apr 14, 1905	Masonic Hall, Stratford, New Zealand	
211	ND	104–50–28 (29)	Launcy	ND	4	Mar 6, 1905	Town Hall, Inglewood, New Zealand	
210	ND	104–50–28 (28)	Tom Toohey	ND	4	Mar 6, 1905	Town Hall, Inglewood, New Zealand	
209	ND	104–50–28 (27)	Charlie Cameron	ND	6	Feb 9, 1905	Town Hall, Midhirst, New Zealand	
208	ND	104–50–28 (26)	Tommy Kee	ND	6	Feb 9, 1905	Town Hall, Midhirst, New Zealand	
207	ND	104–50–28 (25)	Local Amateur	ND	6	Jan 11, 1905	Theatre Royal, New Plymouth, New Zealand	
206	ND	104–50–28 (24)	Teddy Green	ND	3	Oct 21, 1904	Gaiety Athletic Hall, Sydney, New South Wales, Australia	
205	Loss	104–50–28 (23)	Peter Toohey	KO	2 (20)	Sep 13, 1904	NSC, Sydney, New South Wales, Australia	
204	Loss	104–49–28 (23)	Tim Hegarty	KO	3 (20)	Aug 2, 1904	NSC, Sydney, New South Wales, Australia	
203	Draw	104–48–28 (23)	Jack Evans	PTS	6	Dec 29, 1903	Mechanic's Pavilion, San Francisco, California, U.S.	
202	Win	104–48–27 (23)	Teddy Peppers	DQ	2 (10)	Oct 8, 1903	Kansas City, Missouri, U.S.	
201	Loss	103–48–27 (23)	Pat Hogan	PTS	10	Oct 1, 1902	United States of America	Date and location uncertain
200	Win	103–47–27 (23)	Dave Donovan	KO	2 (10)	Sep 7, 1902	Sioux City A.C., Sioux City, Iowa, U.S.	
199	Win	102–47–27 (23)	Johnny Van Heest	KO	4 (10)	Aug 3, 1902	Sioux City A.C., Sioux City, Iowa, U.S.	
198	Loss	101–47–27 (23)	Clarence English	KO	3 (10)	Apr 3, 1902	Carroll, Iowa, U.S.	
197	Win	101–46–27 (23)	Bert Cassell	KO	4 (10)	Jan 12, 1902	O'Neill, Nebraska, U.S.	
196	Loss	100–46–27 (23)	Haich Smith	KO	1 (15)	Sep 13, 1900	Washington Hall, Omaha, Nebraska, U.S.	
195	Loss	100–45–27 (23)	Larry Gleason	RTD	6 (15)	Nov 14, 1899	Grand Opera House, Sioux City, Iowa, U.S.	Murphy broke his arm and had to retire
194	Draw	100–44–27 (23)	Sig Hart	PTS	20	Oct 20, 1899	Sioux City A.C., Sioux City, Iowa, U.S.	
193	Loss	100–44–26 (23)	Sig Hart	PTS	15	Sep 14, 1899	Sioux City A.C., Sioux City, Iowa, U.S.	
192	NC	100–43–26 (23)	Patsy Magner	NC	2 (15)	Aug 11, 1899	Sioux City A.C., Sioux City, Iowa, U.S.	
191	Loss	100–43–26 (22)	Harry Harris	KO	4 (6)	May 19, 1899	Star Theatre, Chicago, Illinois, U.S.	
190	Loss	100–42–26 (22)	Harry Forbes	KO	4 (?)	Apr 29, 1899	Chicago A.A., Chicago, Illinois, U.S.	
189	Draw	100–41–26 (22)	Frank Stackhouse	PTS	8	Apr 11, 1899	Dayton, Ohio, U.S.	
188	Loss	100–41–25 (22)	Kid Moore	PTS	15	Apr 1, 1899	Mansfield, Ohio, U.S.	Date uncertain
187	Loss	100–40–25 (22)	Johnny Van Heest	TKO	6 (10)	Mar 7, 1899	Dayton, Ohio, U.S.	
186	Win	100–39–25 (22)	Walter Burbeck	KO	2 (?)	Feb 15, 1899	Springfield A.C., Springfield, Ohio, U.S.	
185	Loss	99–39–25 (22)	Casper Leon	PTS	10	Jan 16, 1899	Peerless A.C., Cincinnati, Ohio, U.S.	
184	Loss	99–38–25 (22)	Eddie Santry	KO	4 (20)	Nov 26, 1898	Commercial A.C., Saint Louis, Missouri, U.S.	
183	Loss	99–37–25 (22)	Jimmy Reeder	KO	4 (?)	Apr 28, 1898	Mountain City Theatre, Altoona, Pennsylvania, U.S.	
182	Loss	99–36–25 (22)	Yock Henniger	DQ	4 (?)	Apr 12, 1898	Metropolitan Club, Pittsburgh, Pennsylvania, U.S.	
181	ND	99–35–25 (22)	Bill Baxter Junior	ND	4	Mar 9, 1898	Excelsior Hall, Bethnal Green, London, England	
180	Loss	99–35–25 (21)	Will Curley	KO	12 (20)	Feb 25, 1898	Ginnetts Circus, Newcastle, Tyne and Wear, England	
179	ND	99–34–25 (21)	Young Charlie White	ND	3	Jan 17, 1898	Paddington Baths, Queen's Road, Bayswater, London, England	
178	ND	99–34–25 (20)	Bill Wood	ND	3	Nov 1, 1897	National Sporting Club, Covent Garden, London, England	Trial bout
177	Win	99–34–25 (19)	Ellwood McCloskey	NWS	6	Sep 13, 1897	Quaker City A.C., Philadelphia, Pennsylvania, U.S.	
176	Draw	98–34–25 (19)	Billy Rotchford	PTS	3 (20)	Jul 19, 1897	Albany, New York, U.S.	The police intervened
175	Loss	98–34–24 (19)	Oscar Gardner	PTS	20	Apr 10, 1897	Polo A.C., New York City, New York, U.S.	
174	Draw	98–33–24 (19)	Austin Rice	PTS	20	Mar 13, 1897	Polo A.C., New York City, New York, U.S.	
173	Win	98–33–23 (19)	Bill Barbeck	KO	2 (?)	Feb 15, 1897	Dayton, Ohio, U.S.	
172	Loss	97–33–23 (19)	Danny McMahon	NWS	6	Feb 8, 1897	Quaker City A.C., Philadelphia, Pennsylvania, U.S.	
171	Draw	97–32–23 (19)	Dave Wall	PTS	10	Feb 6, 1897	Polo A.C., New York City, New York, U.S.	
170	Loss	97–32–22 (19)	Jack Delaney	KO	5 (15)	Jan 30, 1897	Polo A.C., New York City, New York, U.S.	Not to be confused with Jack Delaney
169	Loss	97–31–22 (19)	George Dixon	KO	6 (20)	Jan 22, 1897	Broadway A.C., Brooklyn, New York City, New York, U.S.	For world featherweight title
168	Draw	97–30–22 (19)	Johnny Lavack	PTS	20	Oct 8, 1896	Lexington Opera House, Lexington, Kentucky, U.S.	
167	Win	97–30–21 (19)	Jim Conners	KO	4 (?)	Apr 29, 1896	Jackson, Mississippi, U.S.	
166	Win	96–30–21 (19)	Paddy Smith	PTS	10	Mar 17, 1896	Olympic A.C., Cincinnati, Ohio, U.S.	
165	Draw	95–30–21 (19)	Jimmy Devers	PTS	10	Feb 11, 1896	Opera House, Jackson, Mississippi, U.S.	
164	Loss	95–30–20 (19)	Solly Smith	TKO	14 (20)	Dec 23, 1895	Olympic Club, New Orleans, Louisiana, U.S.	Police intervened
163	Win	95–29–20 (19)	Jack Dougherty	PTS	10	Nov 13, 1895	Opera House, Lexington, Kentucky, U.S.	
162	Win	94–29–20 (19)	Billy Sheldon	KO	3 (?)	Aug 22, 1895	Louisville, Kentucky, U.S.	
161	Win	93–29–20 (19)	Billy Sheldon	TKO	5 (15)	Aug 6, 1895	National Park, Louisville, Kentucky, U.S.	Police stopped the bout while Sheldon was basically out
160	Draw	92–29–20 (19)	Tommy White	PTS	20	Jul 11, 1895	Grand Opera House, Columbus, Ohio, U.S.	
159	Win	92–29–19 (19)	Jack Dougherty	KO	6 (10)	May 30, 1895	Olympic A.C., Cincinnati, Ohio, U.S.	
158	Draw	91–29–19 (19)	Jack Dougherty	PTS	10	May 6, 1895	Fair Play AC, Cincinnati, Ohio, U.S.	
157	Loss	91–29–18 (19)	Tommy Hogan	PTS	10	Feb 26, 1895	Olympic A.C., Cincinnati, Ohio, U.S.	
156	Win	91–28–18 (19)	Kid McGraw	KO	4 (?)	Feb 5, 1895	Olympic A.C., Cincinnati, Ohio, U.S.	
155	Win	90–28–18 (19)	Frank McCloskey	TKO	9 (10)	Jan 3, 1895	Olympic A.C., Cincinnati, Ohio, U.S.	
154	Win	89–28–18 (19)	Kentucky Rosebud	NWS	4	Dec 8, 1894	Southwark A.C., Philadelphia, Pennsylvania, U.S.	
153	Draw	88–28–18 (19)	Jerry Barnett	PTS	10	Nov 19, 1894	Atlantic A.C., Brooklyn, New York City, New York, U.S.	
152	Win	88–28–17 (19)	Kid Lafeber	KO	2 (?)	Nov 12, 1894	Cincinnati, Ohio, U.S.	
151	Win	87–28–17 (19)	Jack McCabe	KO	2 (?)	Nov 6, 1894	People's Theater, Cincinnati, Ohio, U.S.	
150	Loss	86–28–17 (19)	Young Griffo	PTS	8	May 7, 1894	Casino, Boston, Massachusetts, U.S.	
149	Win	86–27–17 (19)	Peter Manning	KO	4 (?)	Apr 23, 1894	Casino, Boston, Massachusetts, U.S.	
148	Win	85–27–17 (19)	Johnny Breslin	KO	2 (?)	Feb 19, 1894	Lafayette A.C., Boston, Massachusetts, U.S.	
147	Win	84–27–17 (19)	Jack Woods	TKO	2 (?)	Dec 22, 1893	American A.C., Boston, Massachusetts, U.S.	
146	Loss	83–27–17 (19)	George Dixon	DQ	3 (?)	Dec 15, 1893	People's Theater, Paterson, New Jersey, U.S.	
145	Loss	83–26–17 (19)	Ed Gorman	KO	9 (?)	Nov 7, 1893	Grand Opera House, Rock Springs, Wyoming, U.S.	
144	Loss	83–25–17 (19)	Ike Weir	KO	6 (?)	Nov 2, 1893	Cribb Club, Boston, Massachusetts, U.S.	
143	Win	83–24–17 (19)	Jack Collins	KO	2 (?)	Sep 23, 1893	Union A.C., Brooklyn, New York City, New York, U.S.	
142	Win	82–24–17 (19)	Jack Grace	TKO	3 (?)	Sep 22, 1893	Clermont Avenue Rink, Brooklyn, New York City, New York, U.S.	
141	Draw	81–24–17 (19)	Jack Downey	PTS	4	Aug 31, 1893	Passaic A.C., Passaic, New Jersey, U.S.	
140	Draw	81–24–16 (19)	Dick Listman	PTS	4	Jul 17, 1893	Newark, New Jersey, U.S.	
139	Loss	81–24–15 (19)	Jerry Barnett	NWS	4	May 30, 1893	Philadelphia A.C., Philadelphia, Pennsylvania, U.S.	
138	Loss	81–23–15 (19)	Jerry Barnett	PTS	4	Apr 29, 1893	Madison Square Garden, New York City, New York, U.S.	
137	Loss	81–22–15 (19)	Johnny Griffin	KO	7 (20)	Feb 6, 1893	Coney Island A.C., Brooklyn, New York City, New York, U.S.	Lost world 122lbs featherweight title claim
136	NC	81–21–15 (19)	Tommy White	NC	34 (?)	Dec 28, 1892	Pacific A.C., San Francisco	
135	Loss	81–21–15 (18)	Tommy Spider Kelly	PTS	6	Jul 25, 1892	New York City, New York, U.S.	
134	NC	81–20–15 (18)	Johnny Murphy	NC	40 (?)	May 31, 1892	Pacific A.C., San Francisco, California, U.S.	Billed world 122lbs title
133	Loss	81–20–15 (17)	Jim Barron	KO	3 (20)	Feb 16, 1892	Golden Gate A.C., Sydney, New South Wales, Australia	
132	Win	81–19–15 (17)	George Powell	NWS	4	Dec 29, 1891	Olympic Hall, Newcastle, New South Wales, Australia	
131	Win	80–19–15 (17)	Chris Cunningham	KO	3 (4)	Dec 26, 1891	Olympic Hall, Newcastle, New South Wales, Australia	
130	Win	79–19–15 (17)	George Powell	NWS	4	Dec 26, 1891	Olympic Hall, Newcastle, New South Wales, Australia	
129	NC	78–19–15 (17)	Jim Burge	NC	29 (30)	Nov 23, 1891	Sydney Amateur Gymnastic Club, Sydney, New South Wales, Australia	
128	Win	78–19–15 (16)	Bill Jennings	KO	2 (20)	Oct 19, 1891	Sydney Amateur Gymnastic Club, Sydney, New South Wales, Australia	
127	Loss	77–19–15 (16)	Young Griffo	DQ	22 (30)	Jul 22, 1891	Sydney Amateur Gymnastic Club, Sydney, New South Wales, Australia	For world featherweight title
126	Loss	77–18–15 (16)	Artie Tully	PTS	8	May 4, 1891	Crystal Palace, Richmond, Melbourne, Victoria, Australia	
125	Win	77–17–15 (16)	Nipper Peakes	KO	6 (?)	Mar 23, 1891	O'Bierne's Athletic Hall, Broken Hill, New South Wales, Australia	
124	Loss	76–17–15 (16)	Jim Burge	KO	30 (40)	Jan 19, 1891	O'Bierne's Athletic Hall, Broken Hill, New South Wales, Australia	
123	Win	76–16–15 (16)	Pat Carroll	KO	4 (20)	Dec 8, 1890	O'Bierne's Athletic Hall, Broken Hill, New South Wales, Australia	
122	Win	75–16–15 (16)	Jack Krosen	PTS	8	Nov 11, 1890	Apollo Athletic Hall, Melbourne, Victoria, Australia	
121	Win	74–16–15 (16)	Harry Dummy Mace	PTS	8	Nov 10, 1890	Crystal Palace, Richmond, Melbourne	
120	Draw	73–16–15 (16)	Nipper Peakes	PTS	10	Oct 25, 1890	Crystal Palace, Richmond, Melbourne	
119	Win	73–16–14 (16)	Jack Krosen	NWS	4	Sep 29, 1890	Crystal Palace, Richmond, Melbourne, Victoria, Australia	
118	Loss	72–16–14 (16)	Young Griffo	RTD	15 (?)	Sep 2, 1890	Sydney Amateur Gymnastic Club, Sydney, New South Wales, Australia	Lost world featherweight title; Murphy continued to claim the title even after this loss for the championship
117	Win	72–15–14 (16)	Eddie Greaney	PTS	4	May 29, 1890	California A.C., San Francisco, California, U.S	
116	Win	71–15–14 (16)	Tommy White	NWS	4	Apr 21, 1890	Madison Street Theatre, Chicago, Illinois, U.S	
115	Win	70–15–14 (16)	Tommy Warren	KO	4 (?)	Mar 14, 1890	California A.C., San Francisco, California, U.S	Retained world featherweight title; A finish fight
114	Win	69–15–14 (16)	Ike Weir	KO	14 (30)	Jan 13, 1890	California A.C., San Francisco, California, U.S	Won world featherweight title
113	Draw	68–15–14 (16)	Frank Murphy	PTS	27 (?)	Jul 30, 1889	California A.C., San Francisco, California, U.S	Police intervened
112	Win	68–15–13 (16)	Johnny Griffin	KO	3 (?)	Jul 12, 1889	California A.C., San Francisco, California, U.S.	A finish fight
111	Win	67–15–13 (16)	John Simon	KO	1 (4)	May 18, 1889	Waite's Hall, Mt Eden, Auckland, New Zealand	
110	Win	66–15–13 (16)	William Tracey	PTS	8	Mar 16, 1889	Princess Theatre, Dunedin, New Zealand	
109	Win	65–15–13 (16)	Warren	KO	6 (10)	Mar 16, 1889	Princess Theatre, Dunedin, New Zealand	
108	Win	64–15–13 (16)	James Smith	KO	8 (10)	Mar 4, 1889	Princess Theatre, Dunedin, New Zealand	
107	Loss	63–15–13 (16)	Tommy Williams	DQ	4 (?)	Feb 2, 1889	Princess Theatre, Dunedin, New Zealand	
106	Loss	63–14–13 (16)	Young Griffo	PTS	4	Dec 10, 1888	Apollo Athletic Hall, Melbourne, Victoria, Australia	
105	Loss	63–13–13 (16)	Ben Seth	KO	6 (8)	Nov 26, 1888	Apollo Athletic Hall, Melbourne, Victoria, Australia	
104	Win	63–12–13 (16)	Jerry Marshall	KO	1 (8)	Oct 27, 1888	Apollo Athletic Hall, Melbourne, Victoria, Australia	
103	Draw	62–12–13 (16)	Jack Hall	PTS	8	Sep 29, 1888	Apollo Athletic Hall, Melbourne, Victoria, Australia	
102	Win	62–12–12 (16)	Jim Saxon	KO	4 (?)	Sep 1, 1888	Foley's Hall, Sydney, New South Wales, Australia	
101	Win	61–12–12 (16)	Billy Baster	KO	3 (4)	Aug 1, 1888	Princess Theatre, Dunedin, New Zealand	
100	Win	60–12–12 (16)	John Scotty Faddes	KO	3 (4)	Jul 28, 1888	Princess Theatre, Dunedin, New Zealand	
99	Win	59–12–12 (16)	Edward Jones	KO	5 (?)	Jul 1, 1888	Sloan's Theatre, Invercargill, New Zealand	
98	Win	58–12–12 (16)	Joe Molloy	KO	5 (?)	Jun 23, 1888	Princess Theatre, Dunedin, New Zealand	
97	Loss	57–12–12 (16)	Frank Newton	DQ	3 (4)	May 24, 1888	Theatre Royal, Napier, New Zealand	
96	Win	57–11–12 (16)	Harry Brown	KO	3 (6)	May 5, 1888	Flint's Hall, Wairoa, New Zealand	
95	Win	56–11–12 (16)	William Edwards	KO	3 (4)	Apr 28, 1888	Theatre Royal, Gisborne, New Zealand	
94	Win	55–11–12 (16)	Frank Newton	TKO	4 (4)	Apr 14, 1888	Theatre Royal, Napier, New Zealand	
93	Win	54–11–12 (16)	Tony Hogan	TKO	7 (?)	Feb 4, 1888	Gaiety Theatre, Napier, New Zealand	
92	Win	53–11–12 (16)	Jim Mitchell	NWS	4	Feb 4, 1888	Gaiety Theatre, Napier, New Zealand	
91	Win	52–11–12 (16)	James Mannix	TKO	3 (?)	Jan 28, 1888	Gaiety Theatre, Napier, New Zealand	
90	Win	51–11–12 (16)	Jerry Ford	KO	11 (?)	Jan 12, 1888	Princess Theatre, Wellington, New Zealand	
89	Win	50–11–12 (16)	Roy Brooks	KO	1 (4)	Jan 9, 1888	Princess Theatre, Wellington, New Zealand	
88	Win	49–11–12 (16)	Ed Parker	KO	3 (4)	Jan 9, 1888	Princess Theatre, Wellington, New Zealand	
87	Loss	48–11–12 (16)	Jack Hall	DQ	6 (?)	Dec 23, 1887	Princess Theatre, Wellington, New Zealand	
86	Loss	48–10–12 (16)	Ike Fake	DQ	6 (?)	Nov 24, 1887	Volunteer Drill Shed, Wellington, New Zealand	
85	Win	48–9–12 (16)	A 13 Stone Maori	KO	?	Oct 4, 1887	Gaiety Theatre, Napier, New Zealand	
84	Win	47–9–12 (16)	Ike Fake	TKO	3 (?)	Sep 12, 1887	Opera House, Wellington, New Zealand	
83	ND	46–9–12 (16)	Ed Brooks	ND	3	Aug 27, 1887	Oddfellow's Hall, Christchurch, New Zealand	
82	Win	46–9–12 (15)	John Scotty Faddes	KO	2 (?)	Aug 20, 1887	Princess Theatre, Dunedin, New Zealand	
81	Win	45–9–12 (15)	Bill Mitchell	KO	4 (?)	Aug 13, 1887	Princess Theatre, Dunedin, New Zealand	
80	Win	44–9–12 (15)	Ed Burgess	KO	4 (?)	Aug 10, 1887	Princess Theatre, Dunedin, New Zealand	
79	ND	43–9–12 (15)	Ed Brooks	ND	3	Aug 3, 1887	Public Hall, Oamaru, New Zealand	
78	Win	43–9–12 (14)	Fred Bruce	KO	7 (?)	Jul 28, 1887	Odd Fellows Hall, Christchurch, New Zealand	
77	Win	42–9–12 (14)	Richard Allen	KO	7 (?)	Jul 26, 1887	Opera House, Wellington, New Zealand	
76	Win	41–9–12 (14)	Local Amateur	NWS	4	Jun 28, 1887	Volunteer Drill Shed, Wellington, New Zealand	
75	Loss	40–9–12 (14)	Harry Laing	KO	3 (4)	Jun 6, 1887	Princess Theatre, Wanganui, New Zealand	
74	Win	40–8–12 (14)	Nat Brooks	KO	9 (?)	May 21, 1887	Volunteer Drill Shed, Wellington, New Zealand	A finish fight
73	Win	39–8–12 (14)	Charlie Taylor	KO	12 (?)	Apr 27, 1887	Agricultural Hall, Auckland, New Zealand	A finish fight
72	Win	38–8–12 (14)	Jim Saxon	NWS	6	Apr 9, 1887	Agricultural Hall, Auckland, New Zealand	
71	Loss	37–8–12 (14)	Young Mitchell	TKO	5 (?)	Mar 14, 1887	Foley's Hall, Sydney, New South Wales, Australia	A finish fight
70	Win	37–7–12 (14)	Will Brummy Fuller	KO	13 (?)	Feb 23, 1887	Foley's Hall, Sydney, New South Wales, Australia	A finish fight
69	Draw	36–7–12 (14)	Bill Burgess	PTS	36 (?)	Feb 19, 1887	Foley's Hall, Sydney, New South Wales, Australia	
68	ND	36–7–11 (14)	Bill Burgess	ND	4	Feb 15, 1887	Foley's Hall, Sydney, New South Wales, Australia	
67	Draw	36–7–11 (13)	Young Aitken	PTS	4	Feb 12, 1887	Foley's Hall, Sydney, New South Wales, Australia	
66	Win	36–7–10 (13)	George Mullholland	PTS	4	Feb 5, 1887	Foley's Hall, Sydney, New South Wales, Australia	
65	Win	35–7–10 (13)	Billy Williams	NWS	4	Jan 31, 1887	Parramatta, Sydney, New South Wales, Australia	
64	Win	34–7–10 (13)	J Pennington	KO	3 (?)	Jan 26, 1887	Parramatta, Sydney, New South Wales, Australia	
63	Win	33–7–10 (13)	Sam Stewart	KO	18 (?)	Jan 24, 1887	Foley's Hall, Sydney, New South Wales, Australia	
62	Draw	32–7–10 (13)	Stevens	NWS	4	Jan 22, 1887	Foley's Hall, Sydney, New South Wales, Australia	
61	ND	32–7–9 (13)	Stevens	ND	4	Jan 15, 1887	Foley's Hall, Sydney, New South Wales, Australia	
60	Draw	32–7–9 (12)	Jack Fuller	NWS	4	Jan 8, 1887	Foley's Hall, Sydney, New South Wales, Australia	
59	Win	32–7–8 (12)	Bill Scott	KO	2 (?)	Dec 1, 1886	Foley's Hall, Sydney, New South Wales, Australia	
58	ND	31–7–8 (12)	Willie Brummer Fuller	ND	4	Nov 27, 1886	Foley's Hall, Sydney, New South Wales, Australia	
57	ND	31–7–8 (11)	George Mullholland	ND	4	Nov 13, 1886	Foley's Hall, Sydney, New South Wales, Australia	
56	Win	31–7–8 (10)	Frisco McCaull	KO	2 (?)	Nov 6, 1886	Foley's Hall, Sydney, New South Wales, Australia	
55	Win	30–7–8 (10)	Jack Fuller	NWS	4	Oct 30, 1886	Foley's Hall, Sydney, New South Wales, Australia	
54	ND	29–7–8 (10)	Jim O'Brien	ND	4	Oct 23, 1886	Foley's Hall, Sydney, New South Wales, Australia	
53	Win	29–7–8 (9)	Willie Brummer Fuller	KO	14 (?)	Oct 4, 1886	Foley's Hall, Sydney, New South Wales, Australia	
52	ND	28–7–8 (9)	Willie Brummer Fuller	ND	4	Oct 2, 1886	Foley's Hall, Sydney, New South Wales, Australia	
51	ND	28–7–8 (8)	Willie Brummer Fuller	ND	4	Sep 18, 1886	Foley's Hall, Sydney, New South Wales, Australia	
50	ND	28–7–8 (7)	Kelly	ND	4	Sep 11, 1886	Foley's Hall, Sydney, New South Wales, Australia	
49	Win	28–7–8 (6)	Will Brummy Fuller	NWS	4	Sep 4, 1886	Foley's Hall, Sydney, New South Wales, Australia	
48	Win	27–7–8 (6)	Will Brummy Fuller	PTS	4	Aug 28, 1886	Foley's Hall, Sydney, New South Wales, Australia	
47	ND	26–7–8 (6)	Will Brummy Fuller	ND	4	Aug 25, 1886	Foley's Hall, Sydney, New South Wales, Australia	
46	Draw	26–7–8 (5)	Sam Stewart	NWS	4	Aug 21, 1886	Foley's Hall, Sydney, New South Wales, Australia	
45	Win	26–7–7 (5)	Bill Burgess	PTS	4	Jul 10, 1886	Foley's Hall, Sydney, New South Wales, Australia	
44	Win	25–7–7 (5)	Will Brummy Fuller	NWS	4	Jul 10, 1886	Foley's Hall, Sydney, New South Wales, Australia	
43	Win	24–7–7 (5)	Richard Deerfoot Rose	KO	5 (?)	Jun 26, 1886	Foley's Hall, Sydney, New South Wales, Australia	A finish fight
42	Draw	23–7–7 (5)	Richard Deerfoot Rose	NWS	4	Jun 19, 1886	Foley's Hall, Sydney, New South Wales, Australia	
41	Win	23–7–6 (5)	Bert Johnstone	RTD	3 (4)	Jun 5, 1886	Foley's Hall, Sydney, New South Wales, Australia	
40	Win	22–7–6 (5)	Richard Deerfoot Rose	NWS	4	May 29, 1886	Foley's Hall, Sydney, New South Wales, Australia	
39	Draw	21–7–6 (5)	Nipper Peakes	PTS	17 (?)	May 17, 1886	Foley's Hall, Sydney, New South Wales, Australia	
38	Loss	21–7–5 (5)	Jack Hall	RTD	2 (4)	May 8, 1886	Foley's Hall, Sydney, New South Wales, Australia	
37	Win	21–6–5 (5)	Davis	NWS	4	May 1, 1886	Foley's Hall, Sydney, New South Wales, Australia	
36	Win	20–6–5 (5)	Frank King	KO	1 (?)	Mar 27, 1886	Masonic Temple, Sydney, New South Wales, Australia	
35	Draw	19–6–5 (5)	Unknown Walter	NWS	6	Mar 20, 1886	Foley's Hall, Sydney, New South Wales, Australia	
34	Loss	19–6–4 (5)	Jack Hall	RTD	1 (4)	Mar 13, 1886	Foley's Hall, Sydney, New South Wales, Australia	
33	Win	19–5–4 (5)	Walter	NWS	4	Feb 13, 1886	Foley's Hall, Sydney, New South Wales, Australia	
32	Win	18–5–4 (5)	Hobart Jack Gallagher	DQ	12 (?)	Jan 2, 1886	Lorne Street Hall, Auckland, New Zealand	
31	Win	17–5–4 (5)	Johnny The Stranger	KO	8 (?)	Dec 23, 1885	Public Hall, Onehunga, New Zealand	
30	Win	16–5–4 (5)	Jack Nicholson	KO	4 (?)	Dec 5, 1885	Lorne Street Hall, Auckland, New Zealand	
29	Win	15–5–4 (5)	Andy Dawson	KO	2 (?)	Oct 31, 1885	Lorne Street Hall, Auckland, New Zealand	
28	Draw	14–5–4 (5)	Dick Sandall	PTS	3	Oct 5, 1885	Lorne Street Hall, Auckland, New Zealand	
27	Draw	14–5–3 (5)	Richard Deerfoot Rose	PTS	6	Sep 21, 1885	Cook Street Hall, Auckland, New Zealand	
26	Draw	14–5–2 (5)	William Burns	PTS	4	Aug 29, 1885	Lorne Street Hall, Auckland, New Zealand	
25	NC	14–5–1 (5)	Local Amateur	ND	2 (?)	Aug 29, 1885	Lorne Street Hall, Auckland, New Zealand	
24	NC	14–5–1 (4)	Richard Deerfoot Rose	ND	4	Aug 19, 1885	Lorne Street Hall, Auckland, New Zealand	
23	Loss	14–5–1 (3)	Barney Donovan	TKO	9 (?)	Apr 25, 1885	Theatre Royal, Auckland, New Zealand	
22	Win	14–4–1 (3)	Charlie Carter	KO	3 (?)	Mar 14, 1885	Academy of Music, Thames, New Zealand	
21	Win	13–4–1 (3)	Wal Burton	KO	4 (?)	Feb 7, 1885	Academy of Music, Thames, New Zealand	
20	Loss	12–4–1 (3)	Barney Donovan	TKO	7 (?)	Jan 5, 1885	Theatre Royal, Auckland, New Zealand	
19	NC	12–3–1 (3)	Richard Deerfoot Rose	ND	4	Jan 5, 1885	Theatre Royal, Auckland, New Zealand	
18	Win	12–3–1 (2)	Jim Gardiner	KO	3 (?)	Aug 1, 1884	Auckland, New Zealand	
17	Win	11–3–1 (2)	Walter Evans	KO	3 (?)	Jul 1, 1884	Auckland, New Zealand	
16	Win	10–3–1 (2)	Joe Guller	KO	2 (?)	Jun 1, 1884	New Zealand	
15	Win	9–3–1 (2)	Harry Eccles	KO	2 (?)	May 24, 1884	Theatre Royal, Auckland, New Zealand	
14	NC	8–3–1 (2)	Local Amateur	ND	4	Mar 22, 1884	Theatre Royal, Auckland, New Zealand	
13	Win	8–3–1 (1)	Tony Hogan	KO	3 (?)	Mar 15, 1884	Theatre Royal, Auckland, New Zealand	
12	Loss	7–3–1 (1)	Tony Hogan	DQ	3 (?)	Feb 4, 1884	Theatre Royal, Auckland, New Zealand	
11	Win	7–2–1 (1)	Mick O'Brien	KO	4 (?)	Jan 9, 1884	Theatre Royal, Auckland, New Zealand	
10	Win	6–2–1 (1)	Frank Burns	KO	25 (?)	Jul 14, 1883	Lorne Street Hall, Auckland, New Zealand	
9	NC	5–2–1 (1)	Green	ND	4	Jun 9, 1883	Lorne Street Hall, Auckland, New Zealand	
8	Win	5–2–1	William Burns	PTS	4	Dec 4, 1882	Theatre Royal, Auckland, New Zealand	
7	Win	4–2–1	Billy Dawson	KO	1 (?)	May 7, 1882	Auckland Domain, Auckland	
6	Draw	3–2–1	Micky Kirby	PTS	4	May 5, 1882	Theatre Royal, Auckland, New Zealand	
5	Loss	3–2	Hill	PTS	4	May 5, 1882	Theatre Royal, Auckland, New Zealand	
4	Win	3–1	Sammy Heckles	KO	2 (4)	May 2, 1882	Theatre Royal, Auckland, New Zealand	
3	Win	2–1	Banks	PTS	4	Apr 15, 1882	Lorne Street Hall, Auckland, New Zealand	
2	Loss	1–1	Barney Donovan	PTS	4	Apr 15, 1882	Lorne Street Hall, Auckland, New Zealand	
1	Win	1–0	Morris	PTS	4	Apr 11, 1882	Lorne Street Hall, Auckland, New Zealand	

== See also ==
- List of lineal boxing world champions
- List of featherweight boxing champions

Achievements
Preceded by Ike Weir	World featherweight champion 13 January – 2 September 1890	Succeeded by Young Griffo
Sporting positions
Preceded by John L. Sullivan	Oldest living world champion February 2, 1918 – 26 July 1939	Succeeded by Jimmy Barry
