= Tomás Guilherme Murphy =

American-born bishop

Most Reverend Tomás Guilherme Murphy, C.Ss.R. D.D.
- Bishop of Juazeiro
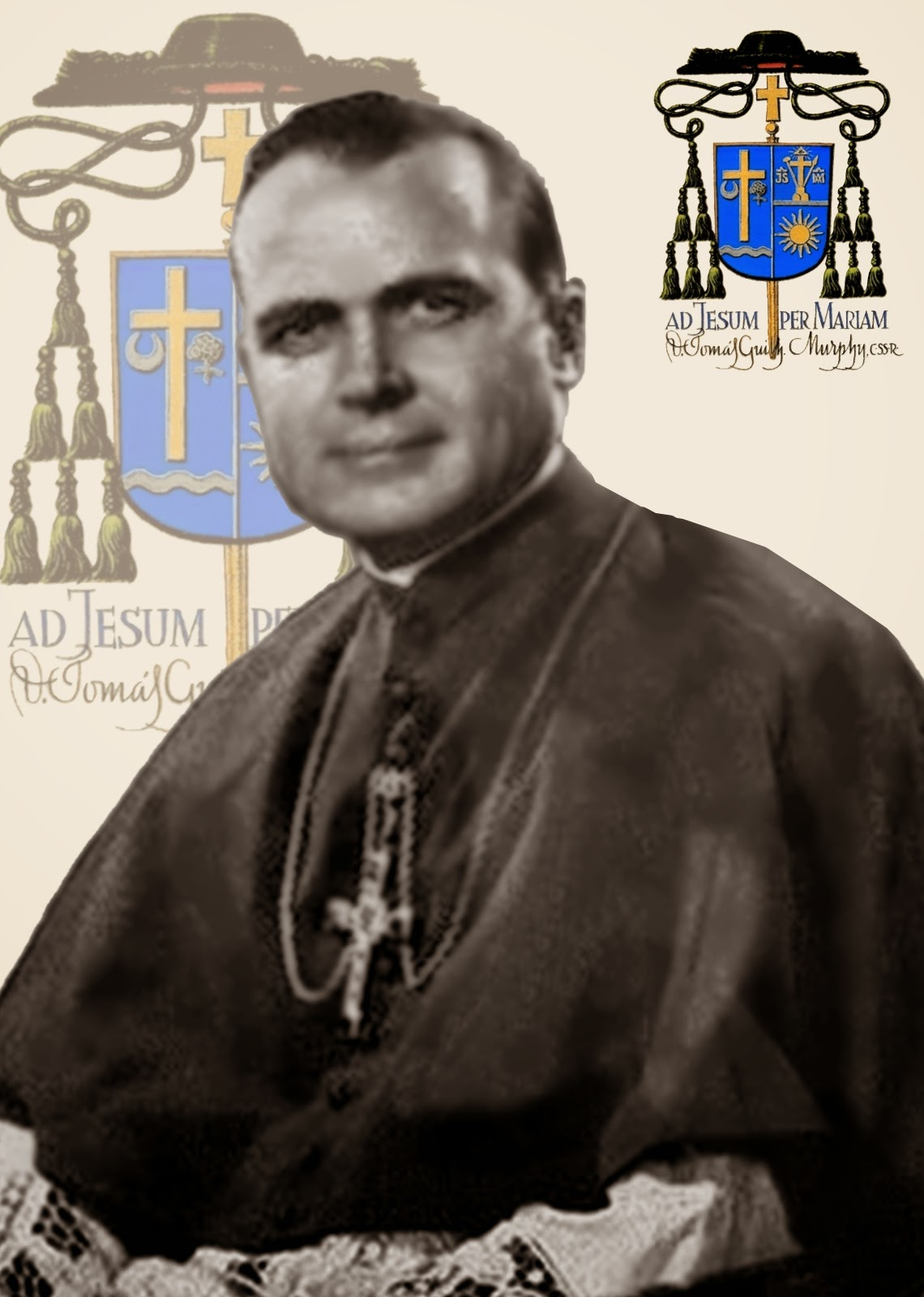
- Tomás Guilherme Murphy, Roman Catholic Diocese of Juazeiro.
- Church: Roman Catholic Church
- See: Diocese of Juazeiro
- In office: October 16, 1962— December 29, 1973
- Predecessor: None
- Successor: José Rodrigues de Souza, C.Ss.R.

Orders
- Ordination: December 27, 1950
- Consecration: January 2, 1963 by Gerald Thomas Bergan

Personal details
- Born: December 17, 1917 Omaha, Nebraska, United States
- Died: July 6, 1995 (aged 77)

Ordination history of Tomás Guilherme Murphy
History
Episcopal consecration
- Consecrated by: Gerald Thomas Bergan
Episcopal succession
Bishops consecrated by Tomás Guilherme Murphy as principal consecrator
- Washington Cruz, C.P.: May 9, 1987

Tomás Guilherme Murphy (December 17, 1917 – July 6, 1995) was an American-born bishop in the Catholic Church. He served as the first bishop of the Diocese of Juazeiro in the state of Bahia, Brazil from 1962 to 1973. He then served as auxiliary bishop of the Archdiocese of São Salvador da Bahia from 1973 to 1995.

== Biography ==
Thomas William Murphy was born in Omaha, Nebraska. He was educated at the Redemptorist minor seminary, St. Joseph's College, in Kirkwood, Missouri. He attended novitiate in De Soto, Missouri where he professed religious vows as a Redemptorist in the St. Louis Province. He studied for the priesthood at Immaculate Conception Seminary in Oconomowoc, Wisconsin and was ordained there on December 27, 1950.

Murphy served as a missionary in the Vice Province of Manaus, Brazil until October 16, 1962 when Pope John XXIII named him to be the first bishop of the newly established Diocese of Juazeiro. He was consecrated a bishop by Archbishop Gerald Thomas Bergan of Omaha on January 2, 1963. The principal co-consecrators were Bishops William Tibertus McCarty, C.Ss.R. of Rapid City, and Glennon Patrick Flavin of Lincoln. Bishop Murphy attended the second and fourth sessions of the Second Vatican Council and was responsible for initiating the Council's reforms in the diocese. He served the Diocese of Juazeiro for eleven years before his resignation for reasons of health was accepted by Paul VI on December 29, 1973. On the same day he was named Titular Bishop of Sululos and Auxiliary Bishop of São Salvador da Bahia. He served the archdiocese until his death on July 6, 1995.
