= List of Catholic dioceses in Brazil =

Overview of the role of the Catholic Church in Brazil

Catholic Church in Brazil
- Portuguese: Igreja Católica no Brasil
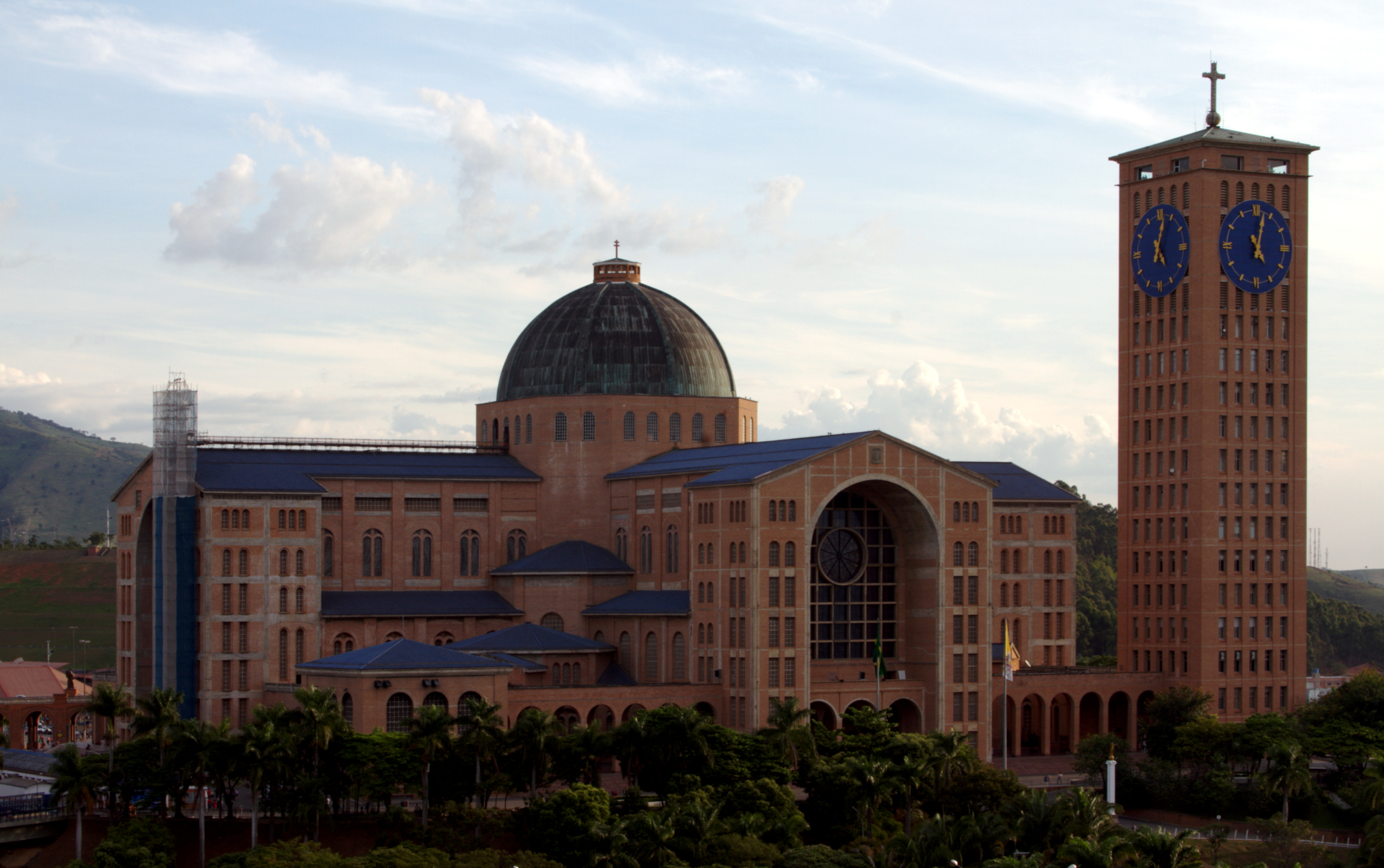
- The Basilica of the National Shrine of Our Lady of Aparecida in Aparecida It is the second largest church in the world, after St. Peter's Basilica in Vatican City.
- Type: National polity
- Classification: Catholic
- Orientation: Latin
- Scripture: Bible
- Theology: Catholic theology
- Polity: Episcopal
- Governance: CNBB
- Pope: Leo XIV
- President: Walmor Oliveira de Azevedo
- Primate: Sérgio da Rocha
- Region: Brazil
- Language: Portuguese, Latin
- Origin: c 1500; Colonial Brazil, Portuguese Empire
- Separations: Brazilian Catholic Apostolic Church
- Members: 123 million - 127 million - 134 million - 140 million
- Official website: CNBB

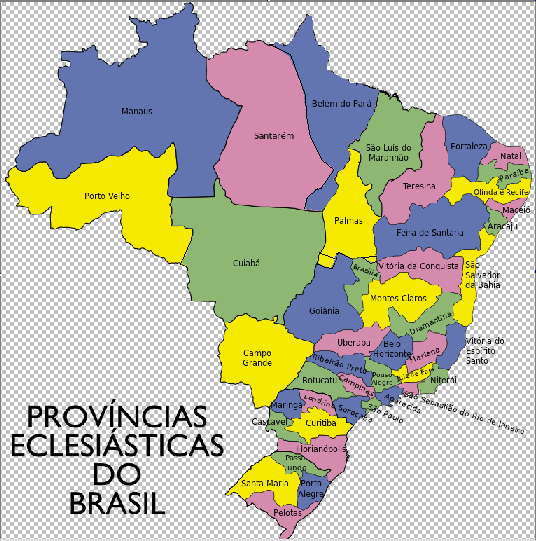
Ecclesiastical provinces of Brazil from 2019 until 2024, a total of 45 provinces. Note: the entire state of Santa Catarina constituted a single ecclesiastical province headquartered in Florianópolis. Then, the dioceses of Chapecó and Joinville were elevated to archdioceses of Chapecó and of Joinville (both not shown in this old map).

This list of Catholic dioceses and archdioceses of Brazil which includes both the dioceses of the Latin Church, which employ the Latin liturgical rites, and various other dioceses, primarily the eparchies of the Eastern Catholic Churches, which employ various Eastern Christian rites, and which are in full communion with the Pope in Rome.

The Catholic Church in Brazil has a total of 275 particular churches — consisting of 45 archdioceses (which head 45 ecclesiastical provinces), 218 dioceses (2 of which are Eastern eparchies under Latin jurisdiction), 7 territorial prelatures, the Archeparchy of São João Batista em Curitiba and the Eparchy of Imaculada Conceição in Prudentópolis under the Ukrainian Greek Catholic Church, the Armenian Catholic Apostolic Exarchate of Latin America and Mexico, the Ordinariate for the Faithful of Eastern Rites in Brazil, the Military Ordinariate of Brazil, and the Personal Apostolic Administration of Saint John Mary Vianney (the only personal apostolic administration in the world). These 275 divisions make the largest number of particular churches in any country.

== Sui iuris Latin Church Jurisdictions ==
Exempt dioceses, directly subject to the Holy See

- Military Ordinariate of Brazil, for the armed force
- Personal Apostolic Administration of Saint John Mary Vianney (traditionalist Tridentine Mass variation on the Roman Rite)

== Latin (or mixed) Catholic Provinces in Brazil ==
=== Region South I ===
State of São Paulo.

==== Ecclesiastical province of Aparecida ====
- Metropolitan Archdiocese of Aparecida
  - Diocese of Caraguatatuba
  - Diocese of Lorena
  - Diocese of São José dos Campos
  - Diocese of Taubaté

==== Ecclesiastical province of Botucatu ====
- Metropolitan Archdiocese of Botucatu
  - Diocese of Araçatuba
  - Diocese of Assis
  - Diocese of Bauru
  - Diocese of Lins
  - Diocese of Marília
  - Diocese of Ourinhos
  - Diocese of Presidente Prudente

==== Ecclesiastical province of São Paulo ====
- Metropolitan Archdiocese of São Paulo
  - Diocese of Campo Limpo
  - Diocese of Guarulhos
  - Diocese of Mogi das Cruzes
  - Maronite Catholic Eparchy of Nossa Senhora do Líbano em São Paulo (Antiochian Rite)
  - Melkite Catholic Eparchy of Nossa Senhora do Paraíso em São Paulo (Byzantine Rite)
  - Diocese of Osasco
  - Diocese of Santo Amaro
  - Diocese of Santo André
  - Diocese of Santos
  - Diocese of São Miguel Paulista

==== Ecclesiastical province of Sorocaba ====
- Metropolitan Archdiocese of Sorocaba
  - Diocese of Itapetininga
  - Diocese of Itapeva
  - Diocese of Jundiaí
  - Diocese of Registro

==== Ecclesiastical province of Ribeirão Preto ====
- Metropolitan Archdiocese of Ribeirão Preto
  - Diocese of Barretos
  - Diocese of Catanduva
  - Diocese of Franca
  - Diocese of Jaboticabal
  - Diocese of Jales
  - Diocese of São João da Boa Vista
  - Diocese of São José do Rio Preto
  - Diocese of Votuporanga

==== Ecclesiastical province of Campinas ====
- Metropolitan Archdiocese of Campinas
  - Diocese of Amparo
  - Diocese of Bragança Paulista
  - Diocese of Limeira
  - Diocese of Piracicaba
  - Diocese of São Carlos

=== Region South II ===
State of Paraná.

==== Ecclesiastical province of Curitiba ====
- Metropolitan Archdiocese of Curitiba
  - Diocese of Guarapuava
  - Diocese of Paranaguá
  - Diocese of Ponta Grossa
  - Diocese of União da Vitória
  - Diocese of São José dos Pinhais

==== Ecclesiastical province of Maringá ====
- Metropolitan Archdiocese of Maringá
  - Diocese of Campo Mourão
  - Diocese of Paranavaí
  - Diocese of Umuarama

==== Ecclesiastical province of Londrina ====
- Metropolitan Archdiocese of Londrina
  - Diocese of Apucarana
  - Diocese of Cornélio Procópio
  - Diocese of Jacarezinho

==== Ecclesiastical province of Cascavel ====
- Metropolitan Archdiocese of Cascavel
  - Diocese of Foz do Iguaçu
  - Diocese of Palmas-Francisco Beltrão
  - Diocese of Toledo

=== Region South III ===
State of Rio Grande do Sul.

==== Ecclesiastical province of Passo Fundo ====
- Metropolitan Archdiocese of Passo Fundo
  - Diocese of Erexim
  - Diocese of Frederico Westphalen
  - Diocese of Vacaria

==== Ecclesiastical province of Pelotas ====
- Metropolitan Archdiocese of Pelotas
  - Diocese of Bagé
  - Diocese of Rio Grande

==== Ecclesiastical province of Porto Alegre ====
- Metropolitan Archdiocese of Porto Alegre
  - Diocese of Caxias do Sul
  - Diocese of Montenegro
  - Diocese of Novo Hamburgo
  - Diocese of Osório

==== Ecclesiastical province of Santa Maria ====
- Metropolitan Archdiocese of Santa Maria
  - Diocese of Cachoeira do Sul
  - Diocese of Cruz Alta
  - Diocese of Santa Cruz do Sul
  - Diocese of Santo Ângelo
  - Diocese of Uruguaiana

=== Region South IV ===
State of Santa Catarina.

==== Ecclesiastical province of Florianópolis ====
- Metropolitan Archdiocese of Florianópolis
  - Diocese of Criciúma
  - Diocese of Tubarão

==== Ecclesiastical province of Joinville ====
- Metropolitan Archdiocese of Joinville
  - Diocese of Blumenau
  - Diocese of Rio do Sul

==== Ecclesiastical province of Chapecó ====
- Metropolitan Archdiocese of Chapecó
  - Diocese of Caçador
  - Diocese of Joaçaba
  - Diocese of Lages

=== Region North I ===
State of Amazonas.

==== Ecclesiastical province of Manaus ====
- Metropolitan Archdiocese of Manaus
  - Diocese of Alto Solimões
  - Diocese of Borba
  - Diocese of Coari
  - Diocese of Parintins
  - Diocese of Roraima
  - Diocese of São Gabriel da Cachoeira
  - Prelature of Itacoatiara
  - Prelature of Tefé

=== Region North II ===
State of Pará.

==== Ecclesiastical province of Belém do Pará ====
- Metropolitan Archdiocese of Belém do Pará
  - Diocese of Abaetetuba
  - Diocese of Bragança do Pará
  - Diocese of Cametá
  - Diocese of Castanhal
  - Diocese of Macapá
  - Diocese of Marabá
  - Diocese of Ponta de Pedras
  - Diocese of Santíssima Conceição do Araguaia
  - Prelature of Marajó

==== Ecclesiastical province of Santarém ====
- Archdiocese of Santarém
  - Prelature of Itaituba
  - Diocese of Óbidos
  - Diocese of Xingu-Altamira
  - Prelature of Alto Xingu-Tecumã

=== Region North III ===
State of Tocantins.

==== Ecclesiastical province of Palmas ====
- Metropolitan Archdiocese of Palmas
  - Diocese of Araguaína
  - Diocese of Cristalândia
  - Diocese of Miracema do Tocantins
  - Diocese of Porto Nacional
  - Diocese of Tocantinópolis

=== Region East I ===
State of Rio de Janeiro.

==== Ecclesiastical province of Rio de Janeiro ====
- Metropolitan Archdiocese of São Sebastião do Rio de Janeiro
  - Diocese of Barra do Piraí-Volta Redonda
  - Diocese of Duque de Caxias
  - Diocese of Itaguaí
  - Diocese of Nova Iguaçu
  - Diocese of Valença

==== Ecclesiastical province of Niterói ====
- Metropolitan Archdiocese of Niterói
  - Diocese of Campos
  - Diocese of Nova Friburgo
  - Diocese of Petrópolis

=== Region East II ===
State of Minas Gerais.

==== Ecclesiastical province of Belo Horizonte ====
- Metropolitan Archdiocese of Belo Horizonte
  - Diocese of Divinópolis
  - Diocese of Luz
  - Diocese of Oliveira
  - Diocese of Sete Lagoas

==== Ecclesiastical province of Juiz de Fora ====
- Metropolitan Archdiocese of Juiz de Fora
  - Diocese of Leopoldina
  - Diocese of São João del Rei

==== Ecclesiastical province of Diamantina ====
- Metropolitan Archdiocese of Diamantina
  - Diocese of Almenara
  - Diocese of Araçuaí
  - Diocese of Guanhães
  - Diocese of Teófilo Otoni

==== Ecclesiastical province of Uberaba ====
- Metropolitan Archdiocese of Uberaba
  - Diocese of Ituiutaba
  - Diocese of Patos de Minas
  - Diocese of Uberlândia

==== Ecclesiastical province of Mariana ====
- Metropolitan Archdiocese of Mariana
  - Diocese of Caratinga
  - Diocese of Governador Valadares
  - Diocese of Itabira–Fabriciano

==== Ecclesiastical province of Montes Claros ====
- Metropolitan Archdiocese of Montes Claros
  - Diocese of Janaúba
  - Diocese of Januária
  - Diocese of Paracatu

==== Ecclesiastical province of Pouso Alegre ====
- Metropolitan Archdiocese of Pouso Alegre
  - Diocese of Campanha
  - Diocese of Guaxupé

=== Region East III ===
==== Ecclesiastical province of Vitória ====
- Metropolitan Archdiocese of Vitória
  - Diocese of Cachoeiro de Itapemirim
  - Diocese of Colatina
  - Diocese of São Mateus

=== Region Center-West ===
State of Goiás and the Federal District.

==== Ecclesiastical province of Brasília ====
- Metropolitan Archdiocese of Brasília
  - Diocese of Formosa
  - Diocese of Luziânia
  - Diocese of Uruaçu

==== Ecclesiastical province of Goiânia ====
- Metropolitan Archdiocese of Goiânia
  - Diocese of Anápolis
  - diocese of Goiás
  - Diocese of Ipameri
  - Diocese of Itumbiara
  - Diocese of Jataí
  - Diocese of Rubiataba-Mozarlândia
  - Diocese of São Luís de Montes Belos

=== Region West I ===
State of Mato Grosso do Sul.

==== Ecclesiastical province of Campo Grande ====
- Metropolitan Archdiocese of Campo Grande
  - Diocese of Corumbá
  - Diocese of Coxim
  - Diocese of Dourados
  - Diocese of Naviraí
  - Diocese of Jardim
  - Diocese of Três Lagoas

=== Region West II ===
State of Mato Grosso.

==== Ecclesiastical province of Cuiabá ====
- Metropolitan Archdiocese of Cuiabá
  - Diocese of Barra do Garças
  - Diocese of Diamantino
  - Diocese of Guiratinga
  - Diocese of Juína
  - Diocese of Paranatinga
  - Diocese of Rondonópolis
  - Diocese of São Luíz de Cáceres
  - Diocese of Sinop
  - Prelature of São Félix

=== Region Northwest ===
States of Rondônia, Acre, Amazonas and Mato Grosso.

==== Ecclesiastical province of Porto Velho ====
- Metropolitan Archdiocese of Porto Velho
  - Diocese of Cruzeiro do Sul
  - Diocese of Guajará-Mirim
  - Diocese of Humaitá
  - Diocese of Ji-Paraná
  - Diocese of Rio Branco
  - Prelature of Lábrea

=== Region Northeast I ===
State of Ceará.

==== Ecclesiastical province of Fortaleza ====
- Metropolitan Archdiocese of Fortaleza
  - Diocese of Crateús
  - Diocese of Crato
  - Diocese of Iguatu
  - Diocese of Itapipoca
  - Diocese of Limoeiro do Norte
  - Diocese of Quixadá
  - Diocese of Sobral
  - Diocese of Tianguá
  - Diocese of Baturité

Region Northeast II (states of Rio Grande do Norte, Paraíba, Pernambuco, Alagoas).

=== Region Northeast II ===
States of Pernambuco, Alagoas, Paraíba and Rio Grande do Norte.

==== Ecclesiastical province of Natal ====
- Metropolitan Archdiocese of Natal
  - Diocese of Caicó
  - Diocese of Mossoró

==== Ecclesiastical province of Olinda e Recife ====
- Metropolitan Archdiocese of Olinda e Recife
  - Diocese of Afogados da Ingazeira
  - Diocese of Caruaru
  - Diocese of Floresta
  - Diocese of Garanhuns
  - Diocese of Nazaré
  - Diocese of Palmares
  - Diocese of Pesqueira
  - Diocese of Petrolina
  - Diocese of Salgueiro

==== Ecclesiastical province of Maceió ====
- Metropolitan Archdiocese of Maceió
  - Diocese of Palmeira dos Índios
  - Diocese of Penedo

==== Ecclesiastical province of Paraíba ====
- Metropolitan Archdiocese of Paraíba
  - Diocese of Cajazeiras
  - Diocese of Campina Grande
  - Diocese of Guarabira
  - Diocese of Patos
    Region Northeast III (states of Bahia and Sergipe).

=== Region Northeast III ===
States of Bahia and Sergipe.

==== Ecclesiastical province of São Salvador da Bahia ====
- Metropolitan and Primatial Archdiocese of São Salvador da Bahia
  - Diocese of Alagoinhas
  - Diocese of Amargosa
  - Diocese of Camaçari
  - Diocese of Cruz das Almas
  - Diocese of Eunápolis
  - Diocese of Ilhéus
  - Diocese of Itabuna
  - Diocese of Teixeira de Freitas-Caravelas

==== Ecclesiastical province of Feira de Santana ====
- Metropolitan Archdiocese of Feira de Santana
  - Diocese of Barra do Rio Grande
  - Diocese of Barreiras
  - Diocese of Bonfim
  - Diocese of Irecê
  - Diocese of Juazeiro
  - Diocese of Paulo Afonso
  - Diocese of Ruy Barbosa
  - Diocese of Serrinha

==== Ecclesiastical province of Vitória da Conquista ====
- Metropolitan Archdiocese of Vitória da Conquista
  - Diocese of Bom Jesus da Lapa
  - Diocese of Caetité
  - Diocese of Jequié
  - Diocese of Livramento de Nossa Senhora

==== Ecclesiastical province of Aracaju ====
- Metropolitan Archdiocese of Aracaju
  - Diocese of Estância
  - Diocese of Propriá

=== Region Northeast IV ===
State of Piauí.

==== Ecclesiastical province of Teresina ====
- Metropolitan Archdiocese of Teresina
  - Diocese of Bom Jesus do Gurguéia
  - Diocese of Campo Maior
  - Diocese of Floriano
  - Diocese of Oeiras
  - Diocese of Parnaíba
  - Diocese of Picos
  - Diocese of São Raimundo Nonato

=== Region Northeast V ===
State of Maranhão.

==== Ecclesiastical province of São Luís do Maranhão ====
- Metropolitan Archdiocese of São Luís do Maranhão
  - Diocese of Bacabal
  - Diocese of Balsas
  - Diocese of Brejo
  - Diocese of Carolina
  - Diocese of Caxias do Maranhão
  - Diocese of Coroatá
  - Diocese of Grajaú
  - Diocese of Imperatriz
  - Diocese of Pinheiro
  - Diocese of Viana
  - Diocese of Zé Doca

== Eastern Catholic proper and exempt jurisdictions ==
- Ordinariate for the Faithful of Eastern Rites in Brazil

=== Armenian Catholic Church ===
part of the Armenian Catholic Church (Armenian Rite)

but exempt, directly subject to the Holy See

- Armenian Catholic Apostolic Exarchate of Latin America and Mexico

=== Ukrainian Greek Catholic (Byzantine Rite) Ecclesiastical province of São João Batista em Curitiba ===
part of the Eastern particular Ukrainian Greek Catholic Church, using its Ukrainian language Byzantine rite

- Metropolitan Archeparchy of São João Batista em Curitiba
  - Eparchy of Imaculada Conceição in Prudentópolis (Ukrainian)

== Defunct jurisdictions ==
excluding those which were simply promoted to existing ones above

- Territorial Prelature of Bananal
- Territorial Abbacy of Claraval
- Diocese of Guiratinga (originally Territorial Prelature)
- Abbacy nullius of Nossa Senhora do Monserrate do Rio de Janeiro
- Territorial Prelate of Paranatinga
- Territorial Prelature of Registro do Araguaia
- Territorial Prelature of São José de Alto Tocantins

== Gallery of Brazilian Archdioceses ==
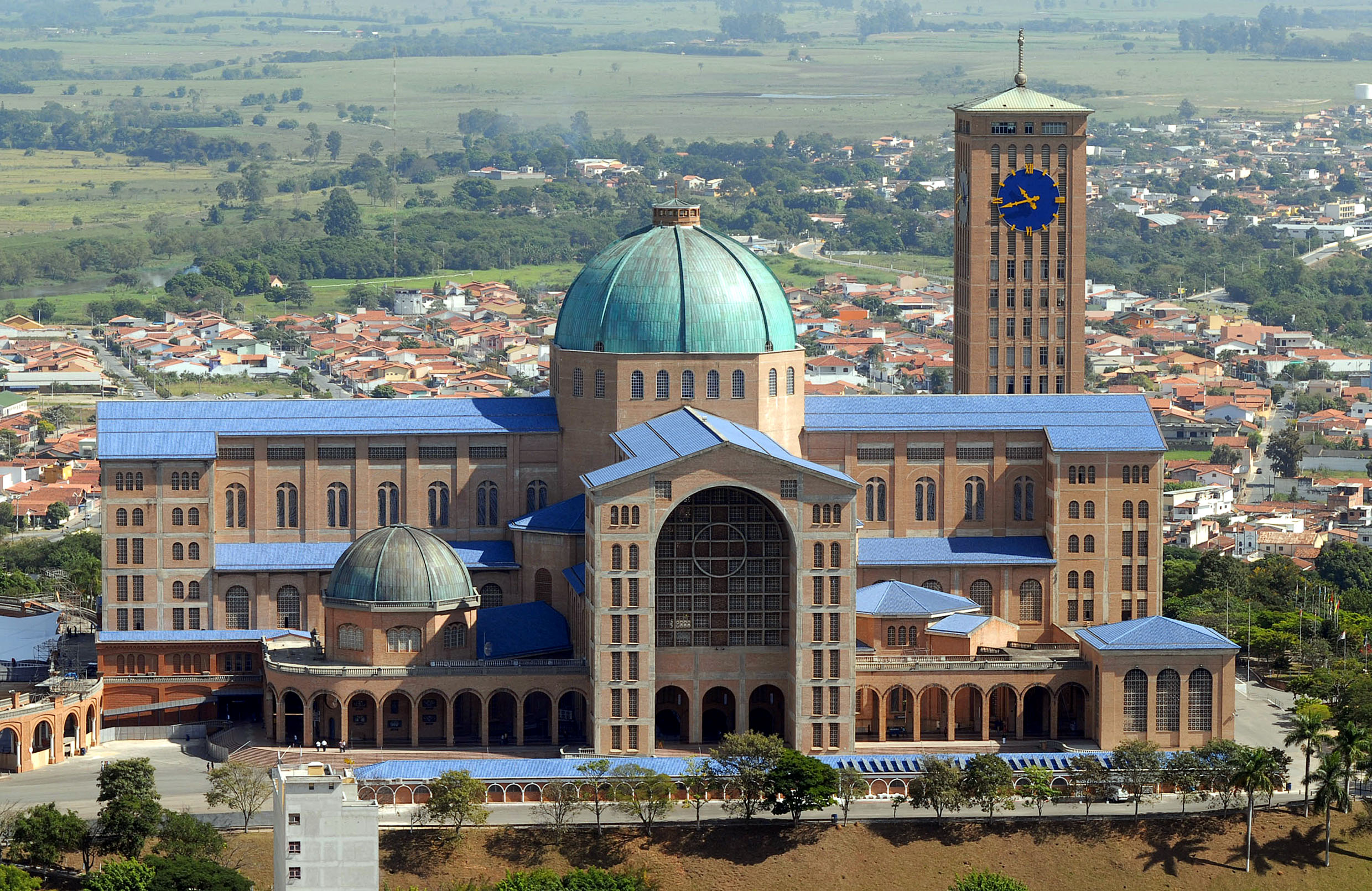
The seat of the Archdiocese of Aparecida is Catedral Basílica Santuário Nacional de Nossa Senhora da Conceição Aparecida.

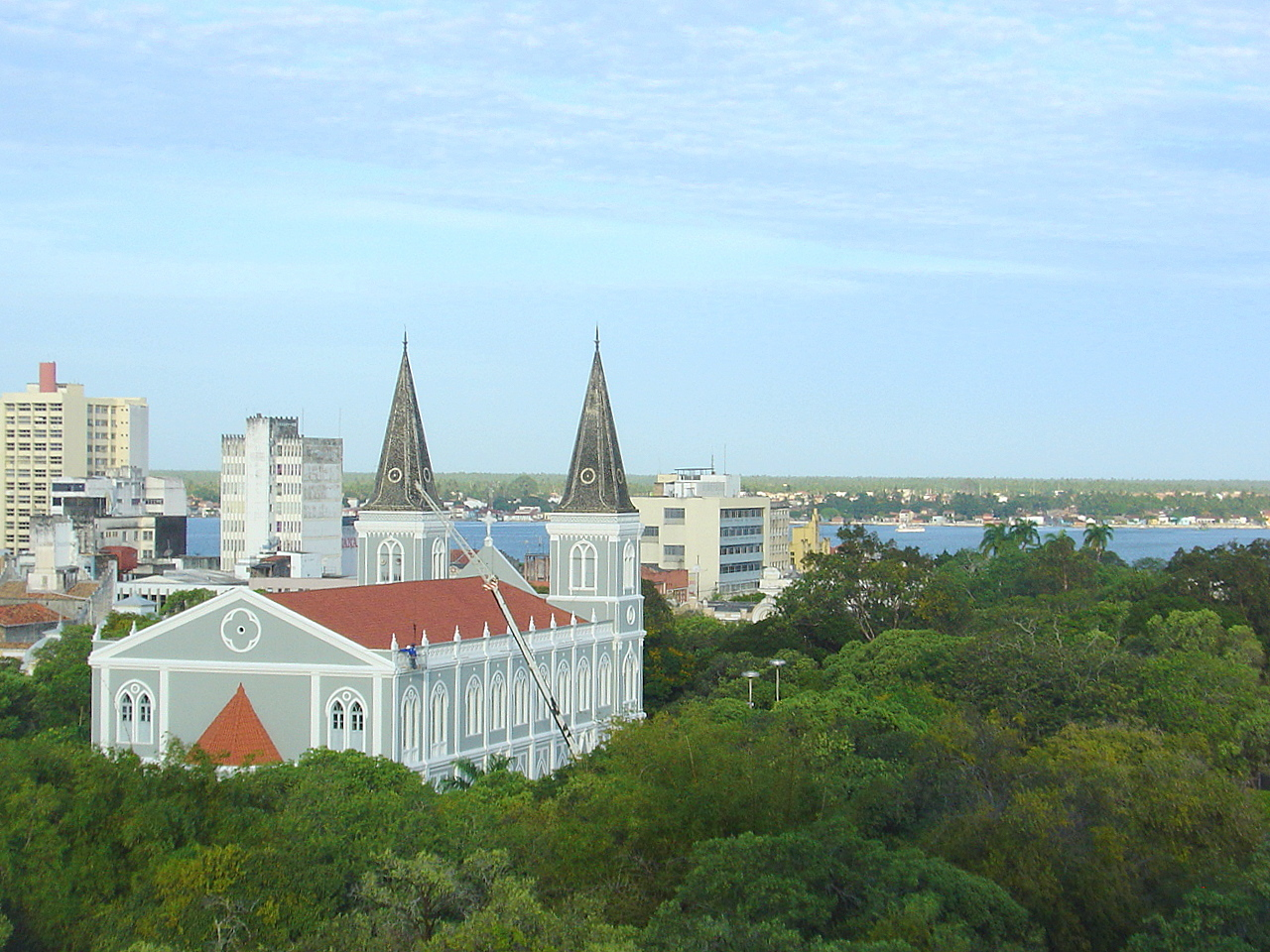
The seat of the Archdiocese of Aracaju is Catedral Metropolitana Nossa Senhora da Conceiçao.

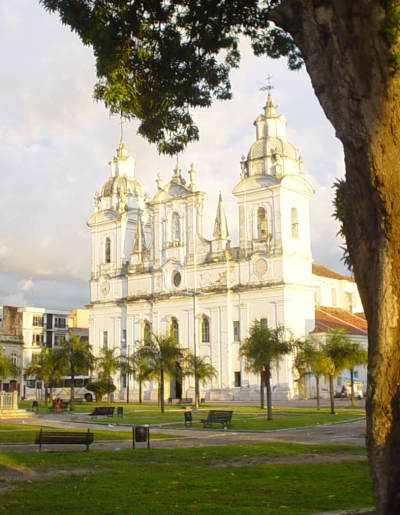
The seat of the Archdiocese of Belém do Pará is Catedral Metropolitana Nossa Senhora das Graças.

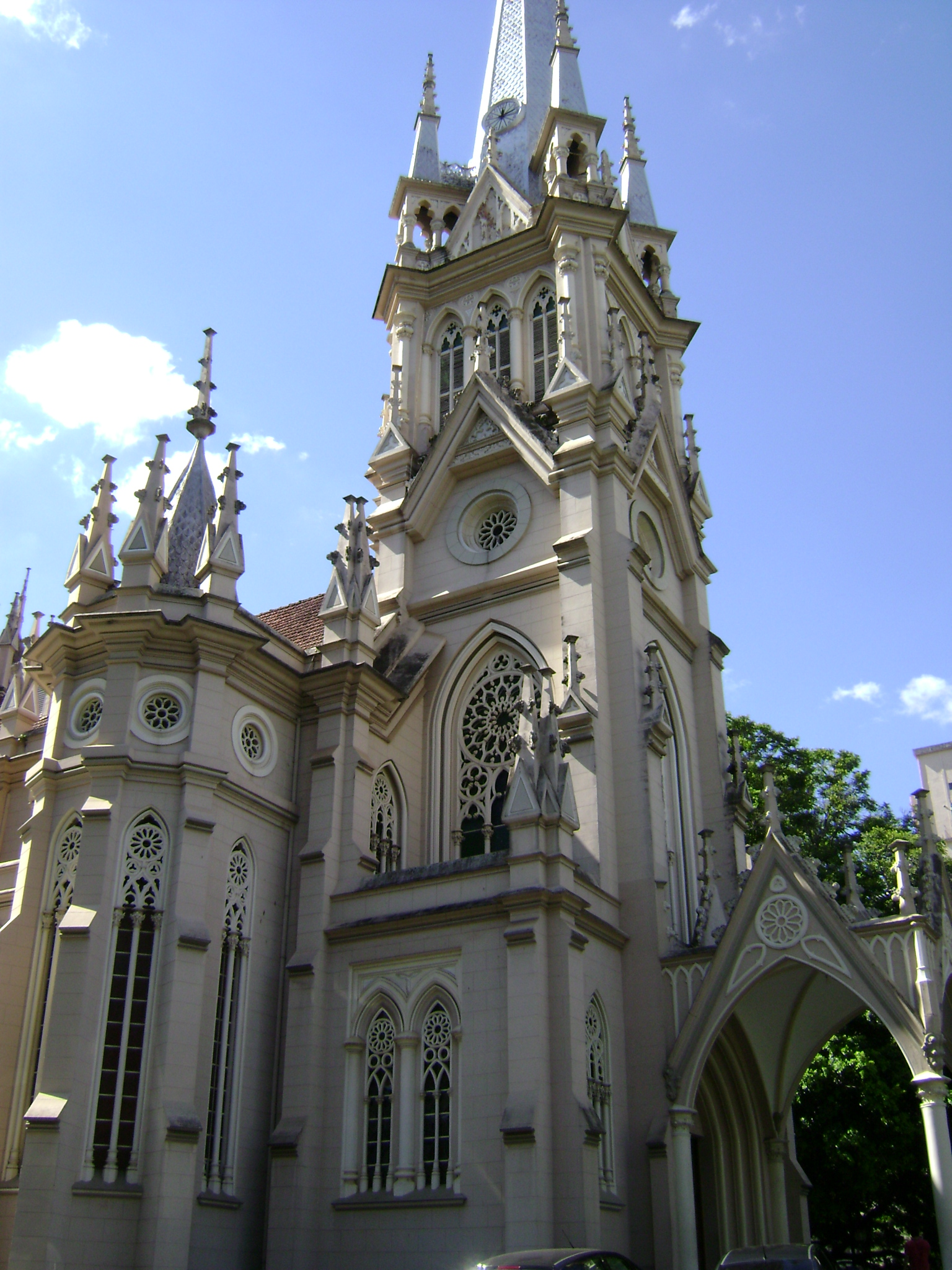
The seat of the Archdiocese of Belo Horizonte is Catedral Metropolitana Nossa Senhora da Boa Viagem.

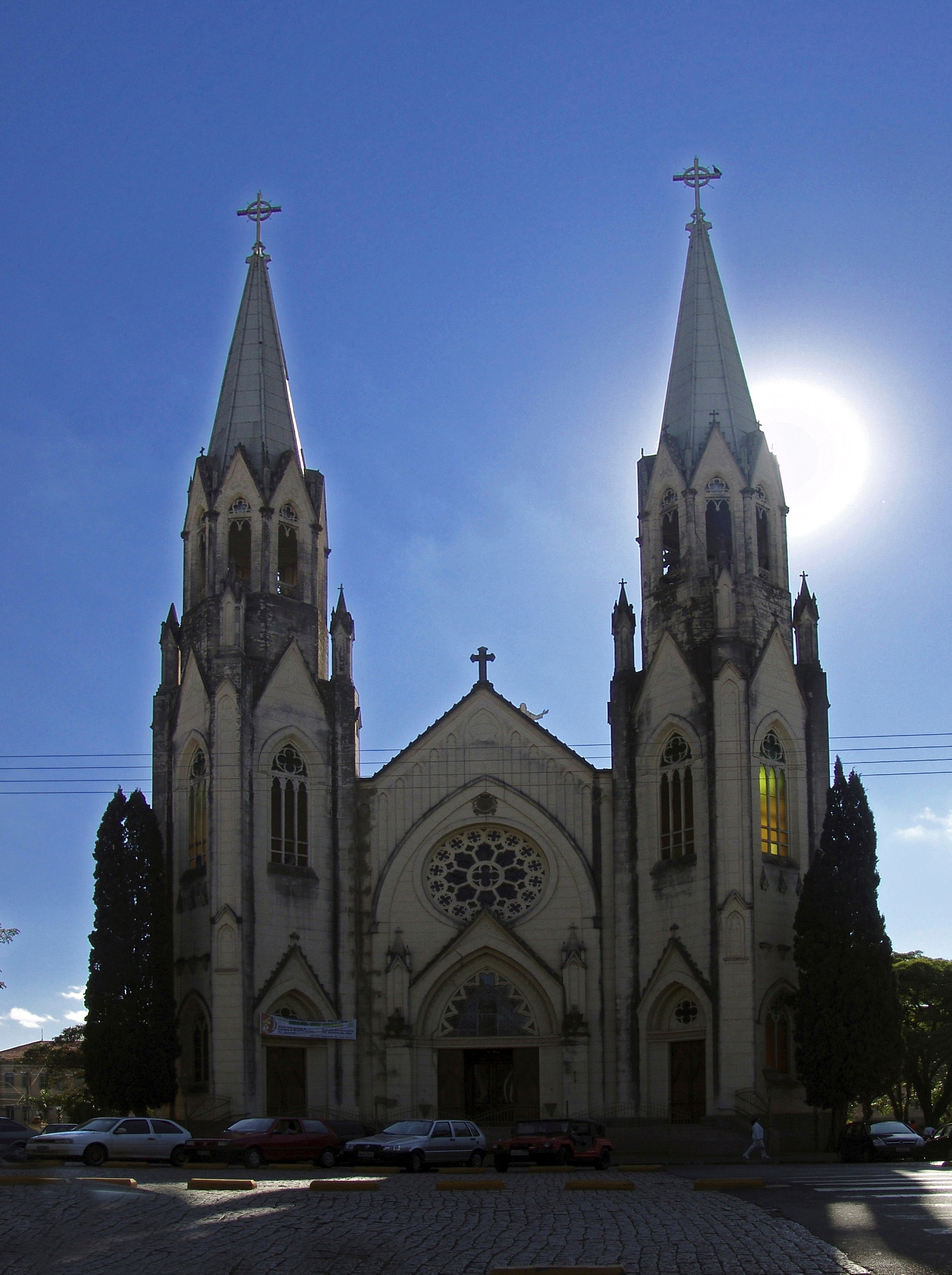
The seat of the Archdiocese of Botucatu is Catedral Metropolitana Basílica Sant’Ana.

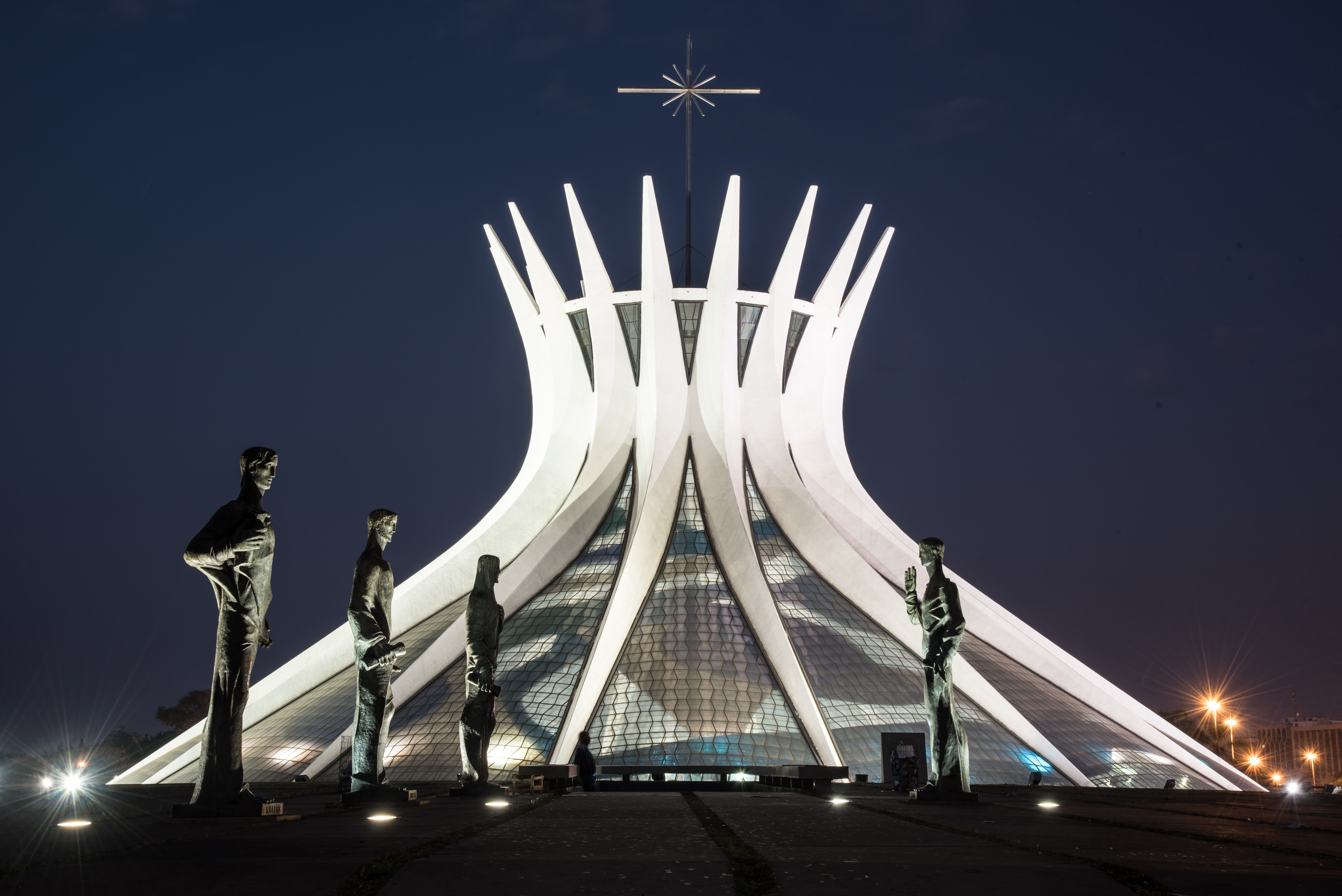
The seat of the Archdiocese of Brasília is Catedral Metropolitana Nossa Senhora Aparecida.

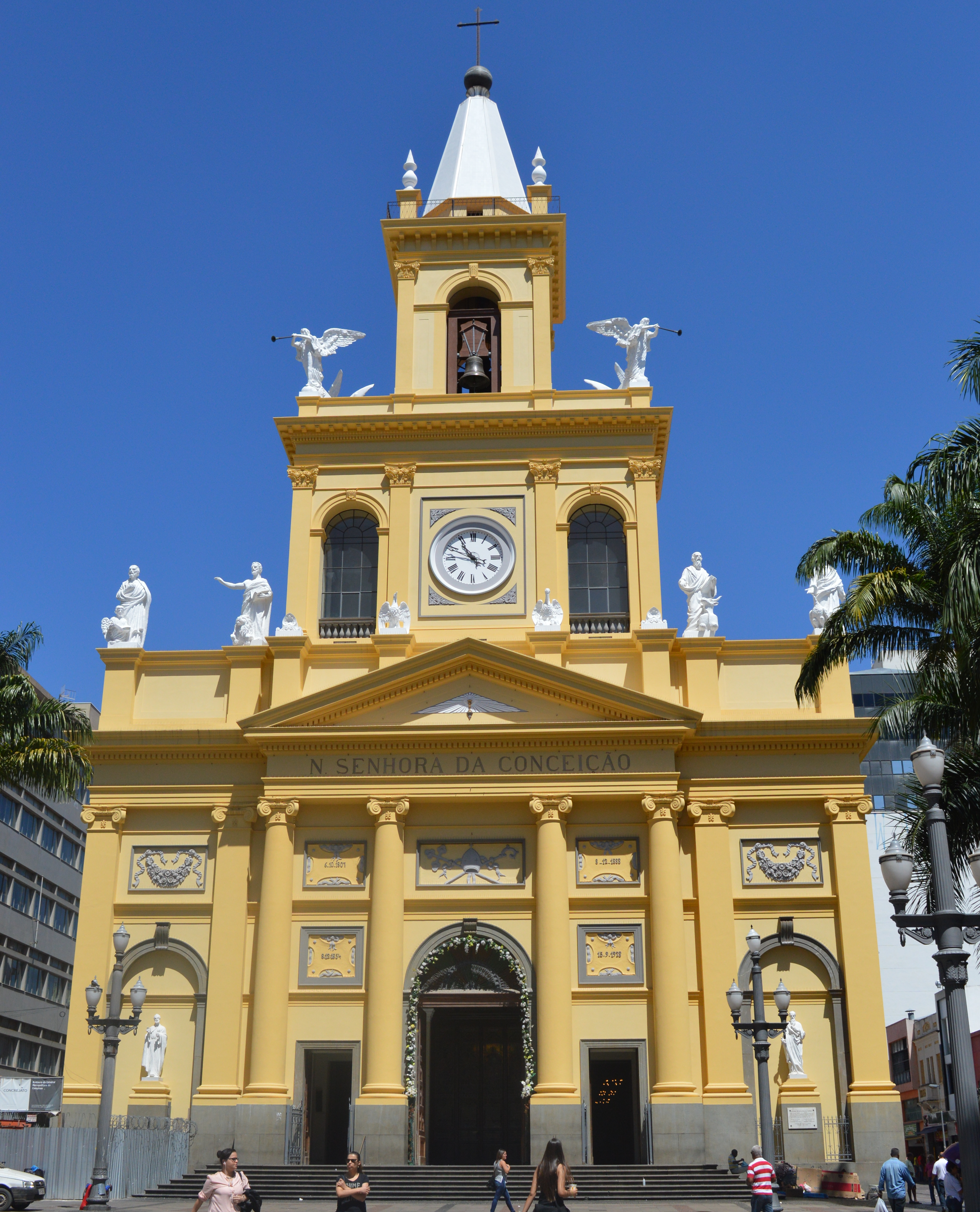
The seat of the Archdiocese of Campinas is Catedral Metropolitana Nossa Senhora da Conceição.

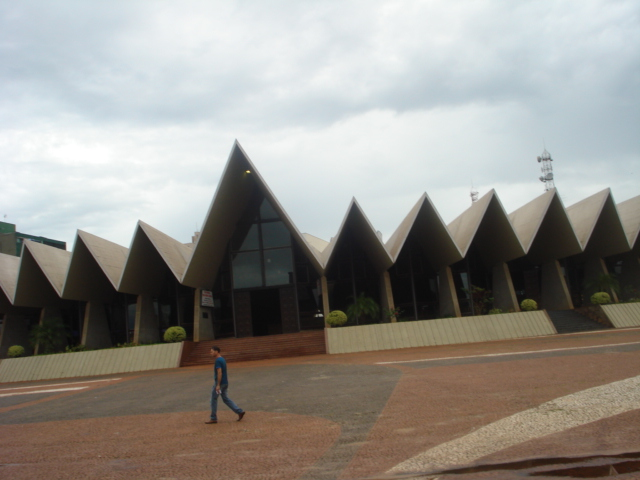
The seat of the Archdiocese of Cascavel is Catedral Metropolitana Nossa Senhora Aparecida.

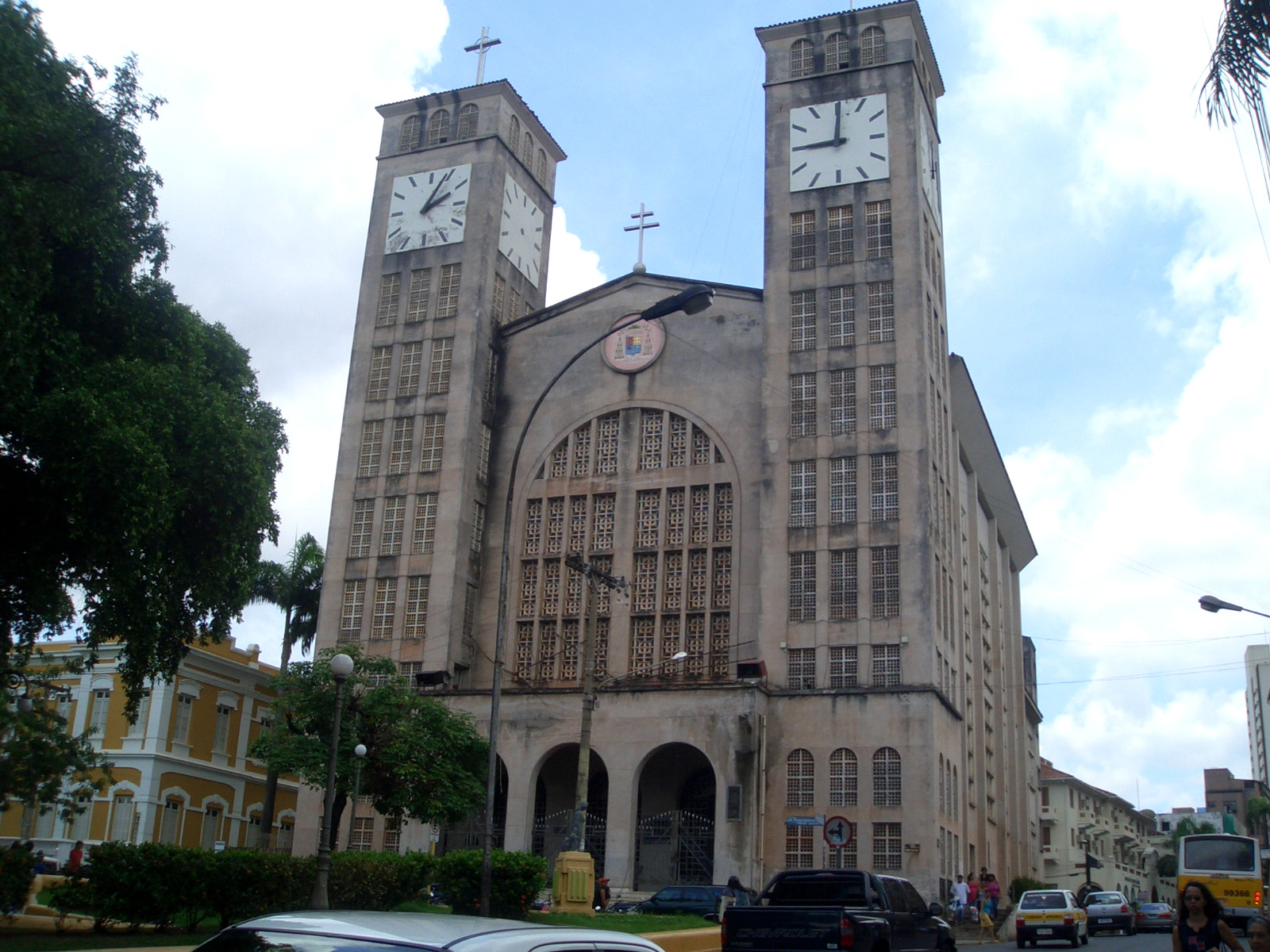
The seat of the Archdiocese of Cuiabá is Catedral Metropolitana Basílica Senhor Bom Jesus.

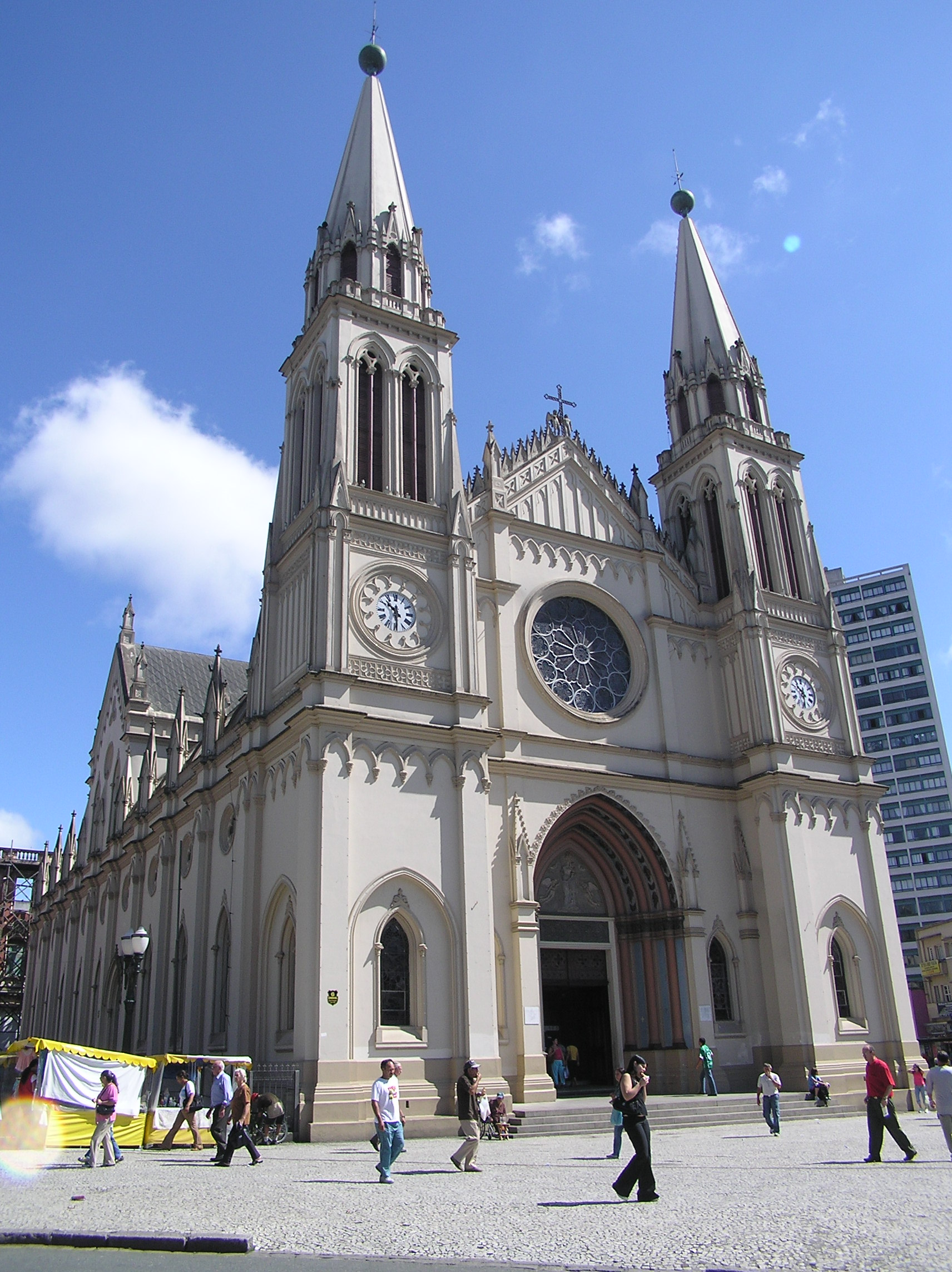
The seat of the Archdiocese of Curitiba is Catedral Metropolitana Basílica Nossa Senhora da Luz dos Pinhais.

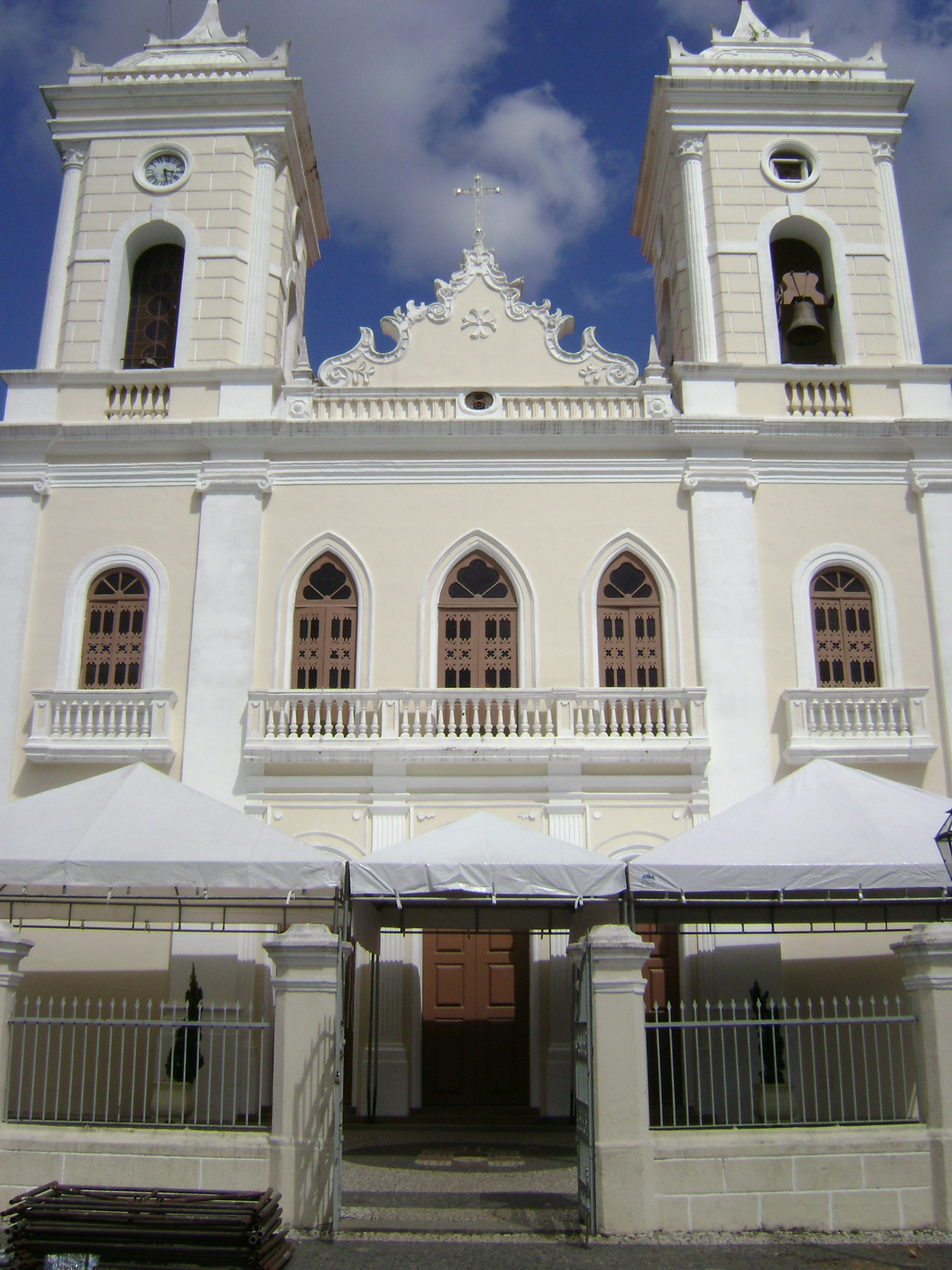
The seat of the Archdiocese of Feira de Santana is Catedral Metropolitana Senhora Sant’Ana.

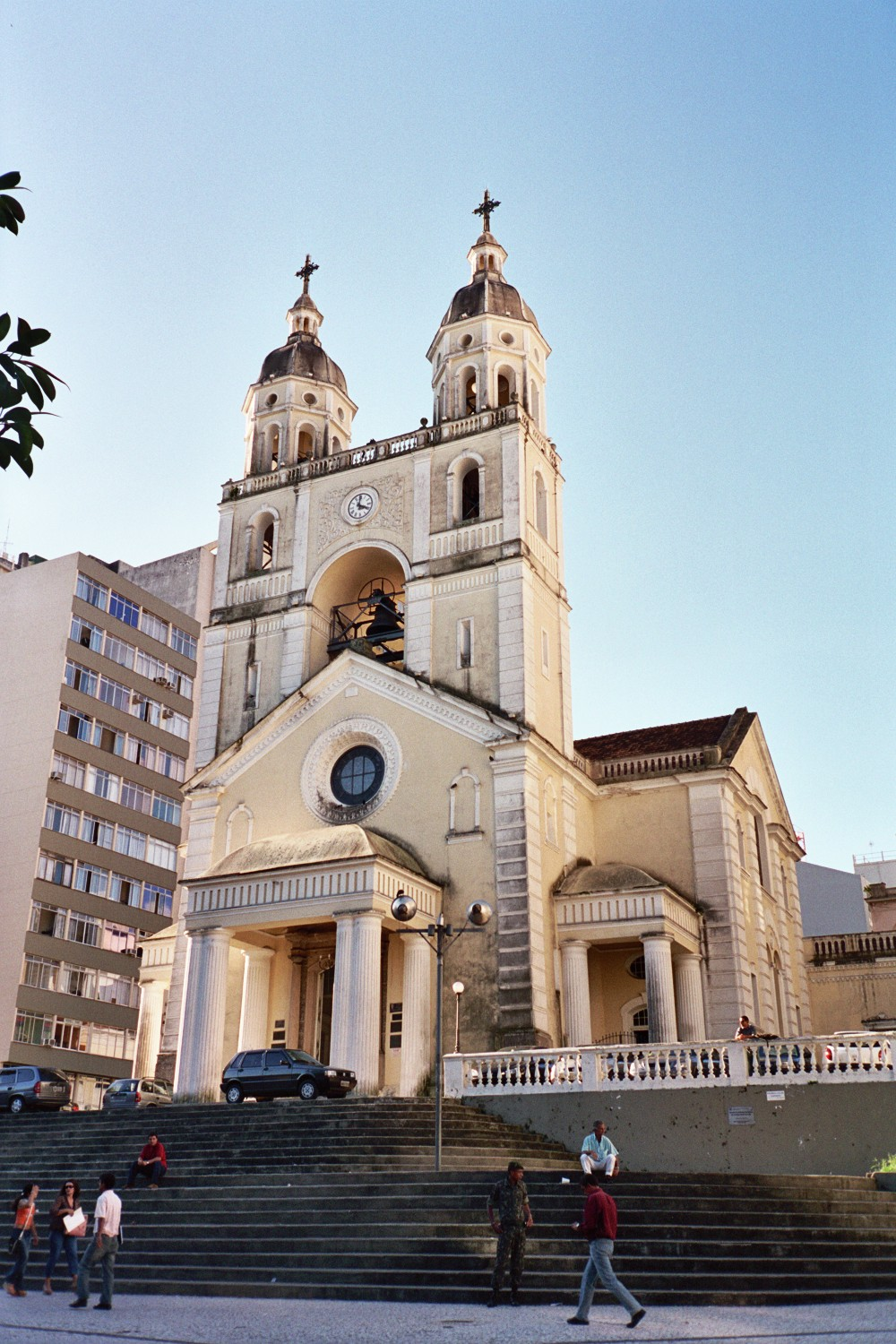
The seat of the Archdiocese of Florianópolis is Catedral Metropolitana Nossa Senhora do Desterro.

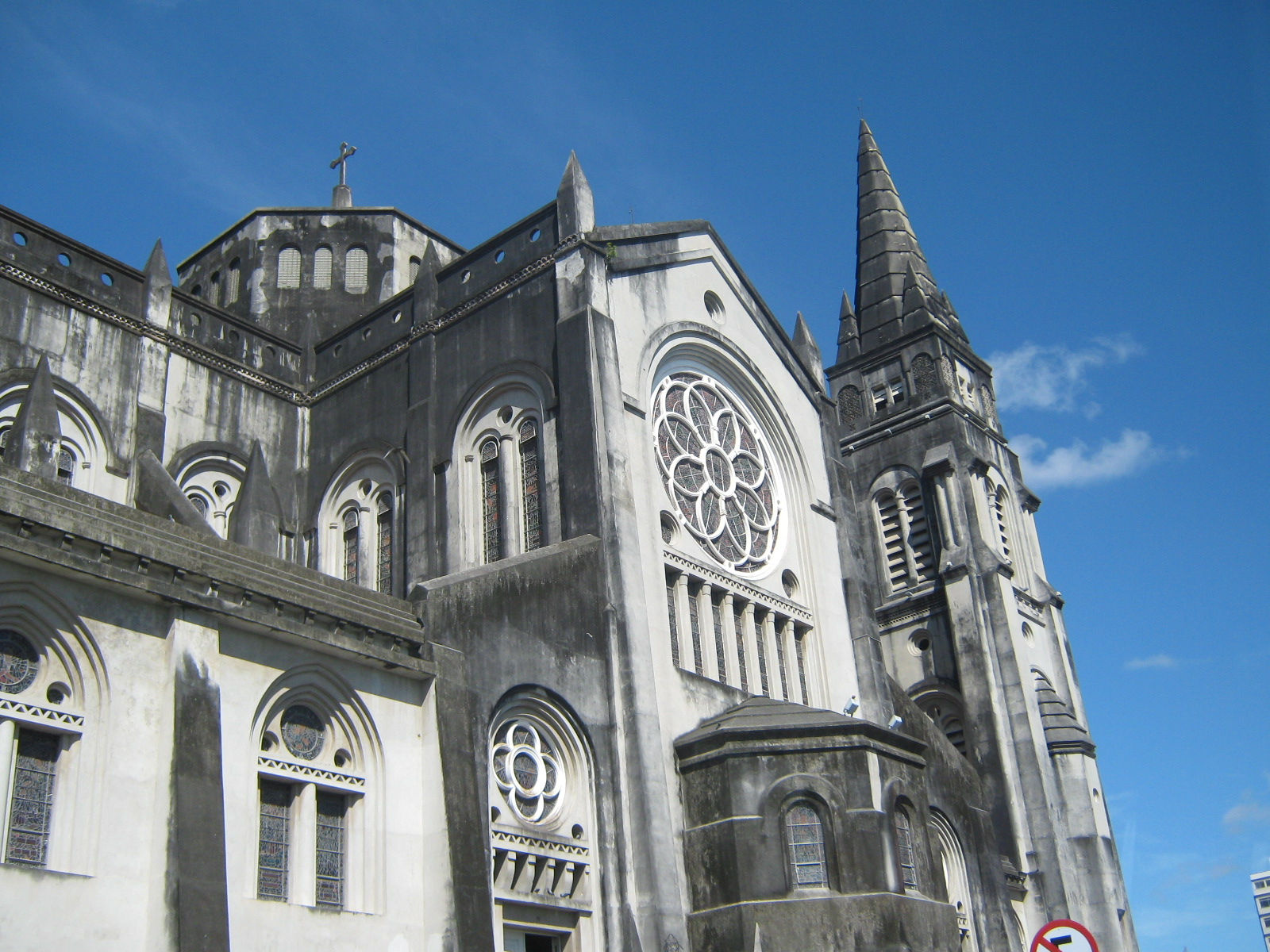
The seat of the Archdiocese of Fortaleza is Catedral Metropolitana São José.

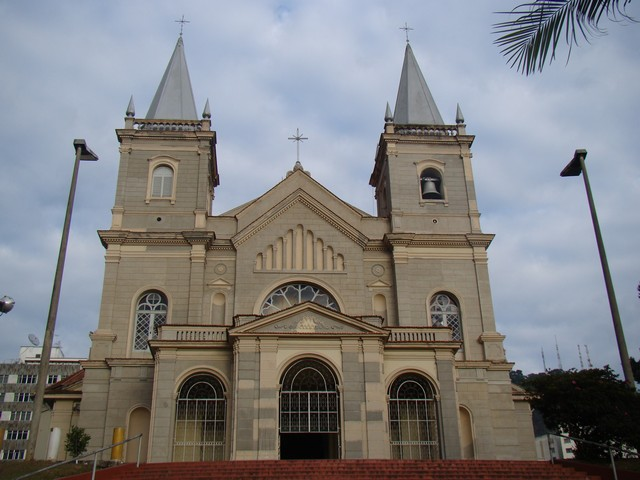
The seat of the Archdiocese of Juiz de Fora is Catedral Metropolitana Santo Antônio.

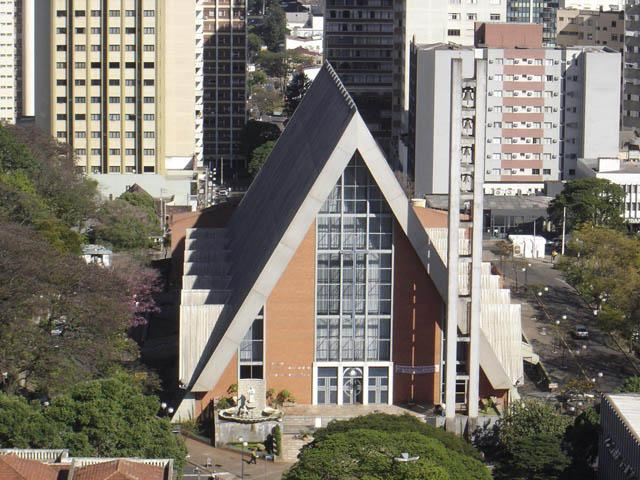
The seat of the Archdiocese of Londrina is Catedral Metropolitana Sagrado Coração de Jesus.

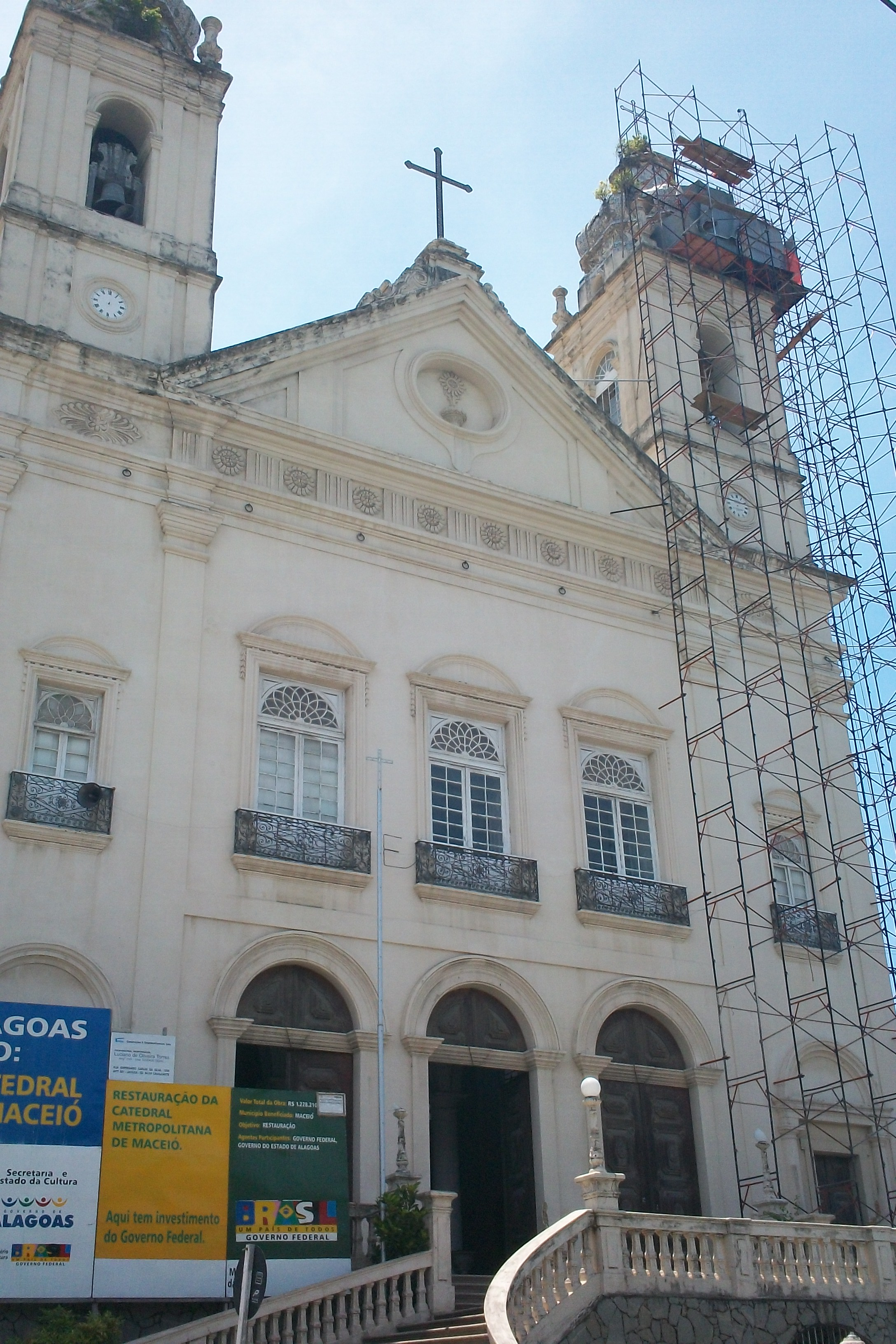
The seat of the Archdiocese of Maceió is Catedral Metropolitana Nossa Senhora dos Prazeres.

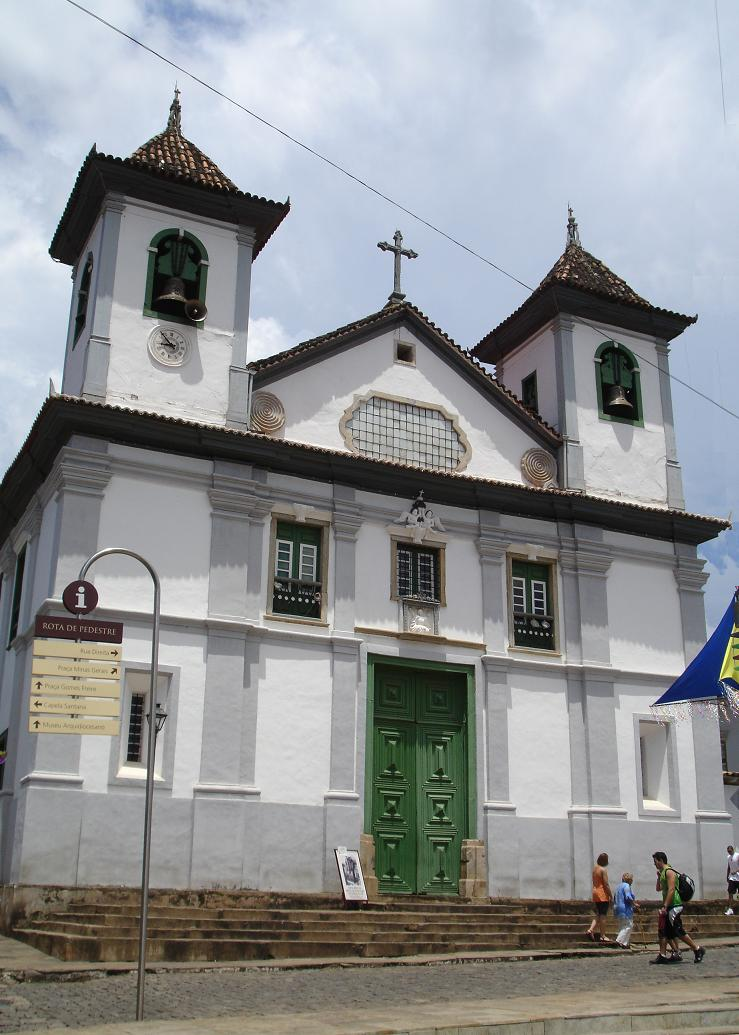
The seat of the Archdiocese of Mariana is Catedral Metropolitana Basílica Nossa Senhora da Assunção.

The seat of the Archdiocese of Maringá is Catedral Basílica Menor Nossa Senhora da Glória.

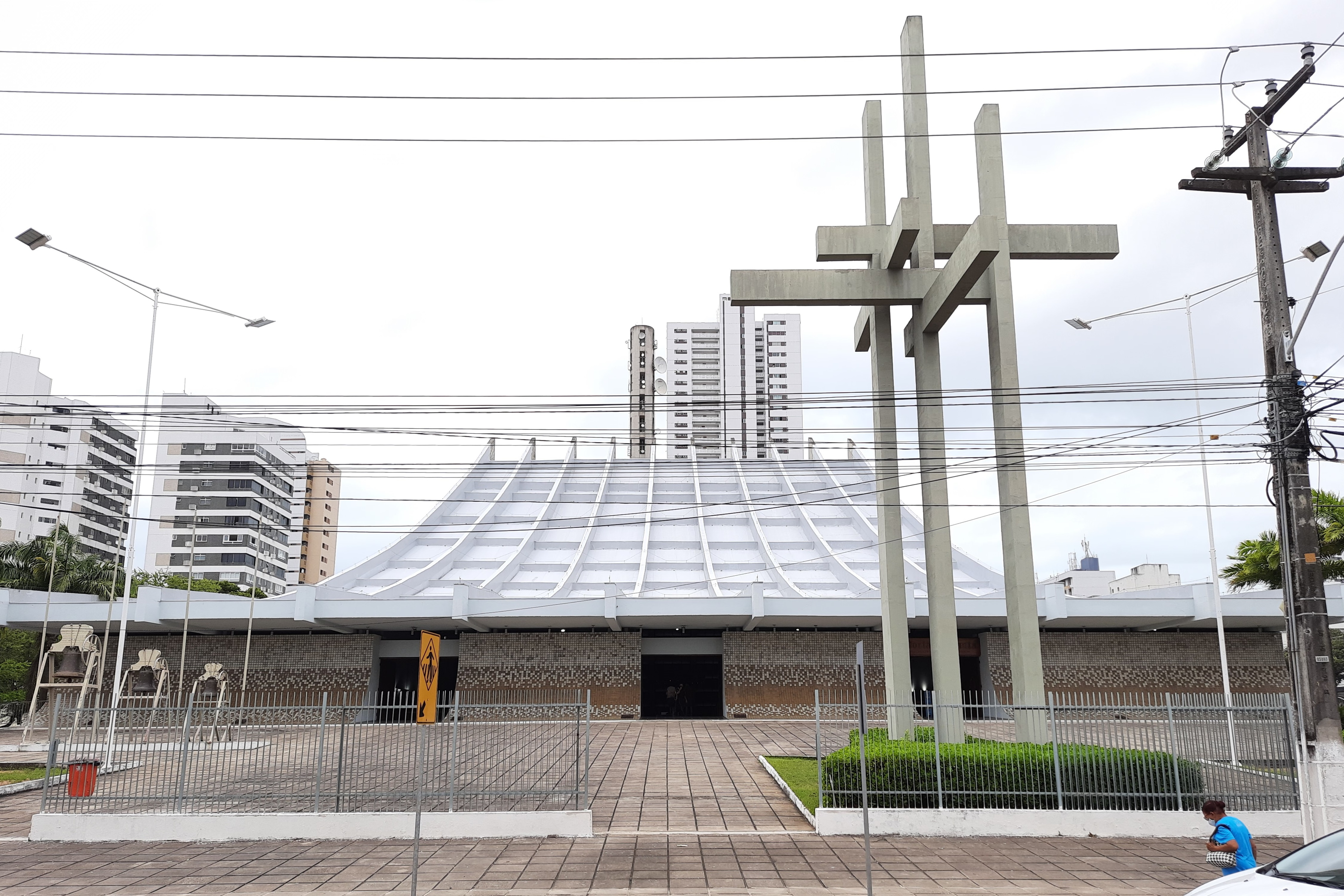
The seat of the Archdiocese of Natal is Catedral Metropolitana Nossa Senhora da Apresentação.

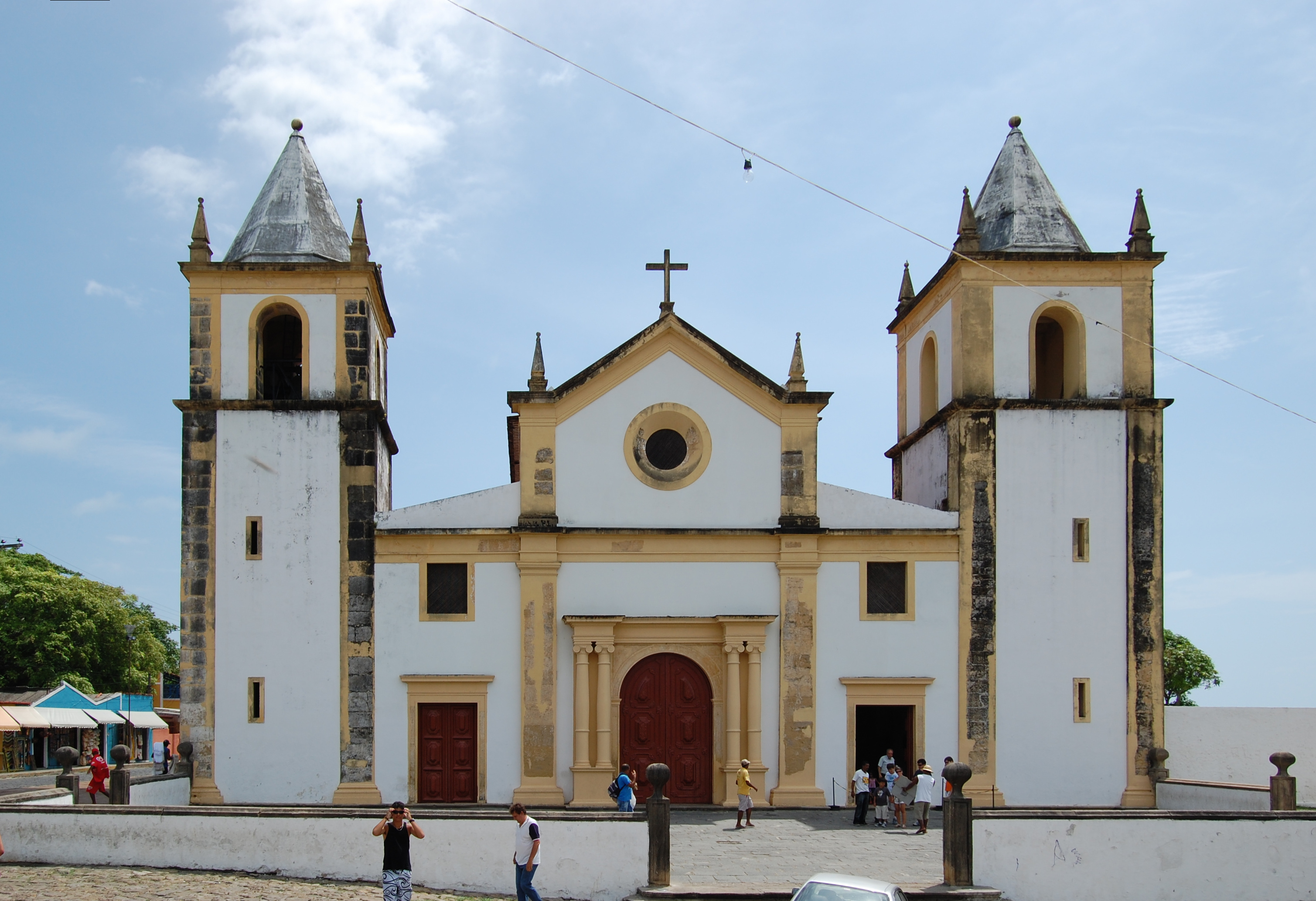
The seat of the Archdiocese of Olinda e Recife is Catedral Metropolitana São Salvador do Mundo.

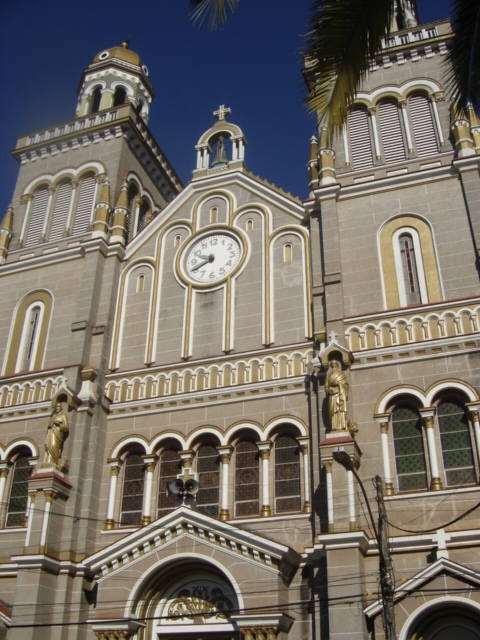
The seat of the Archdiocese of Passo Fundo is Catedral Nossa Senhora Aparecida.

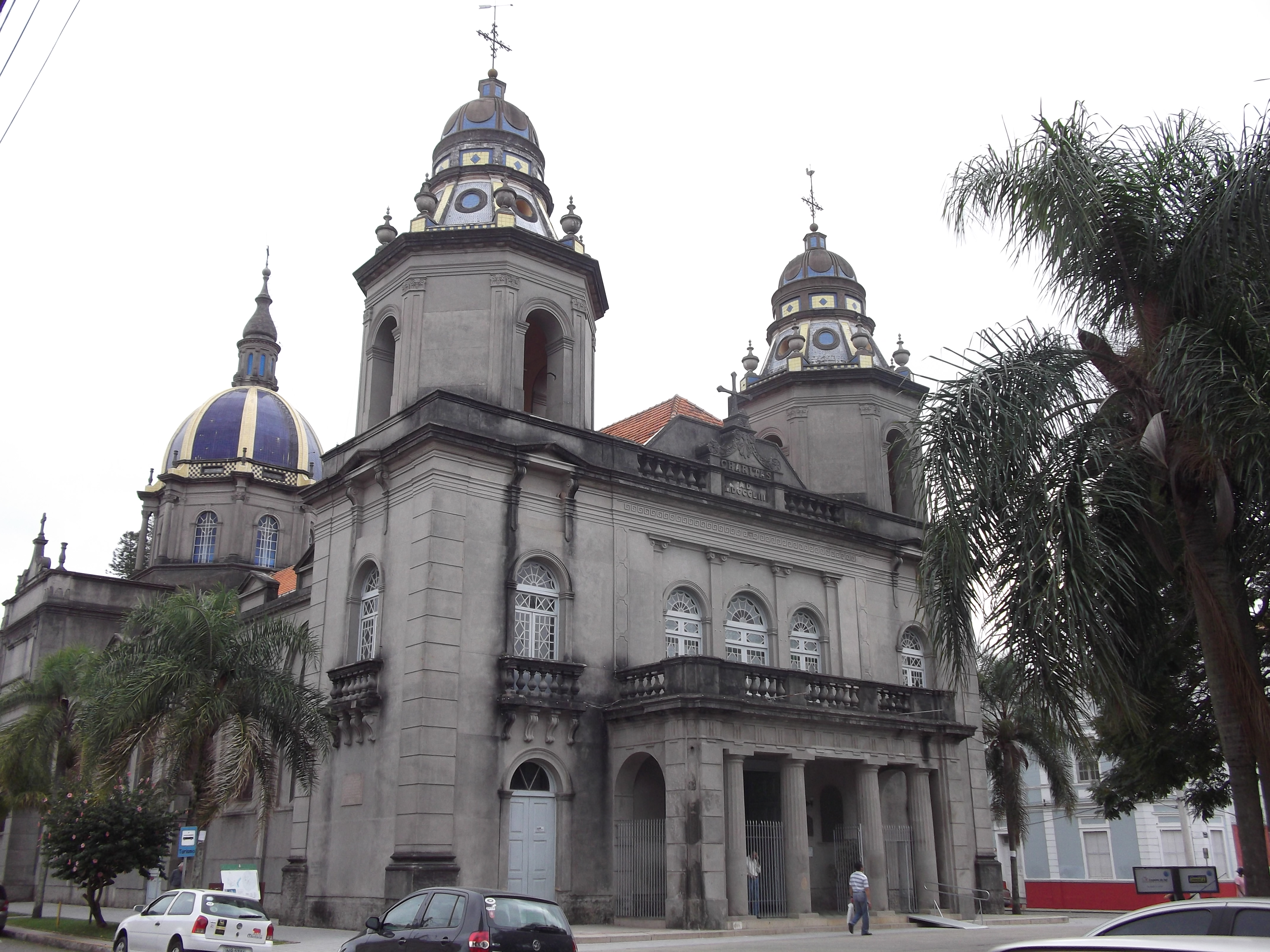
The seat of the Archdiocese of Pelotas is Catedral São Francisco de Paula.

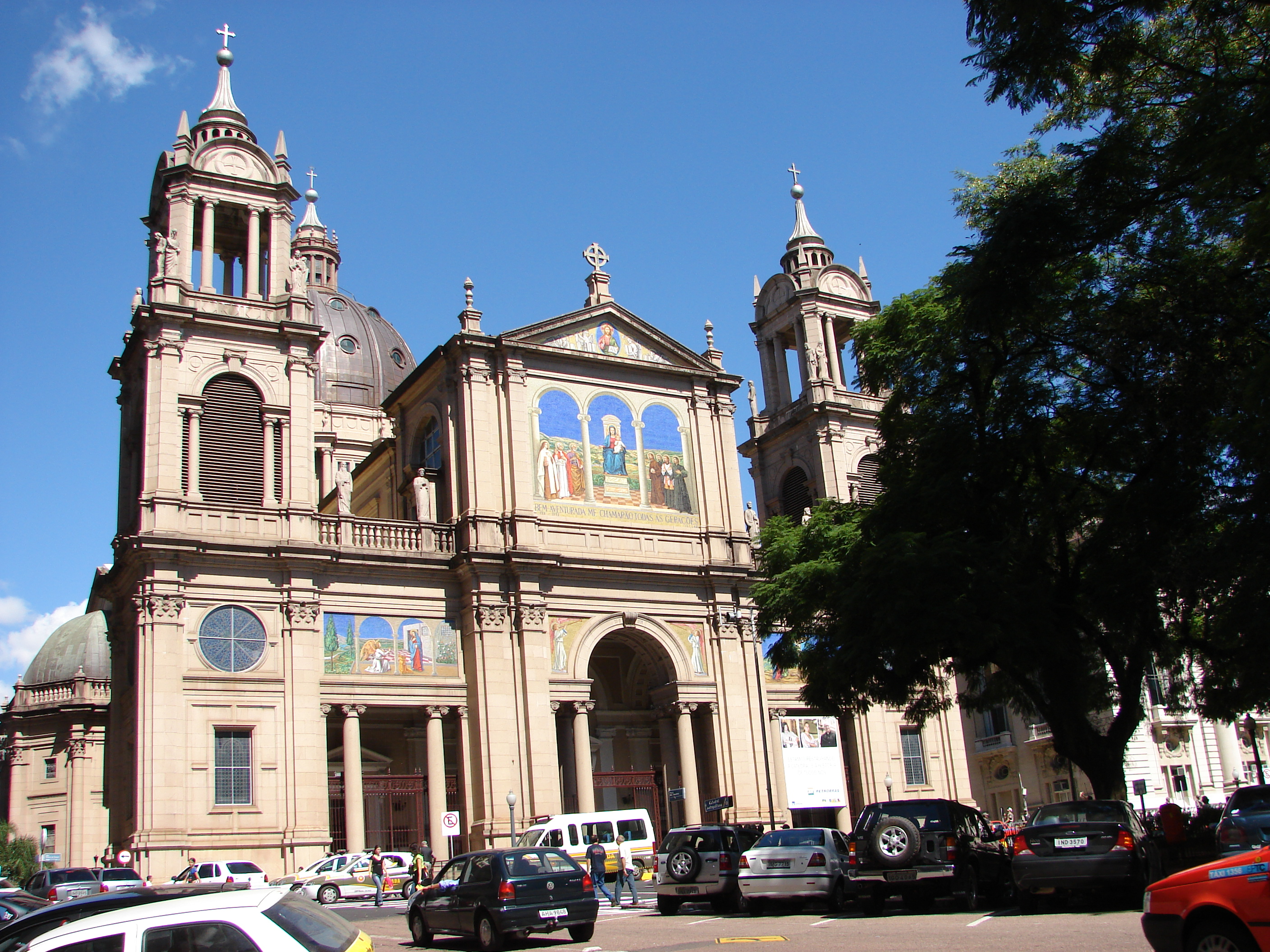
The seat of the Archdiocese of Porto Alegre is Catedral Metropolitana Nossa Senhora Madre de Deus.

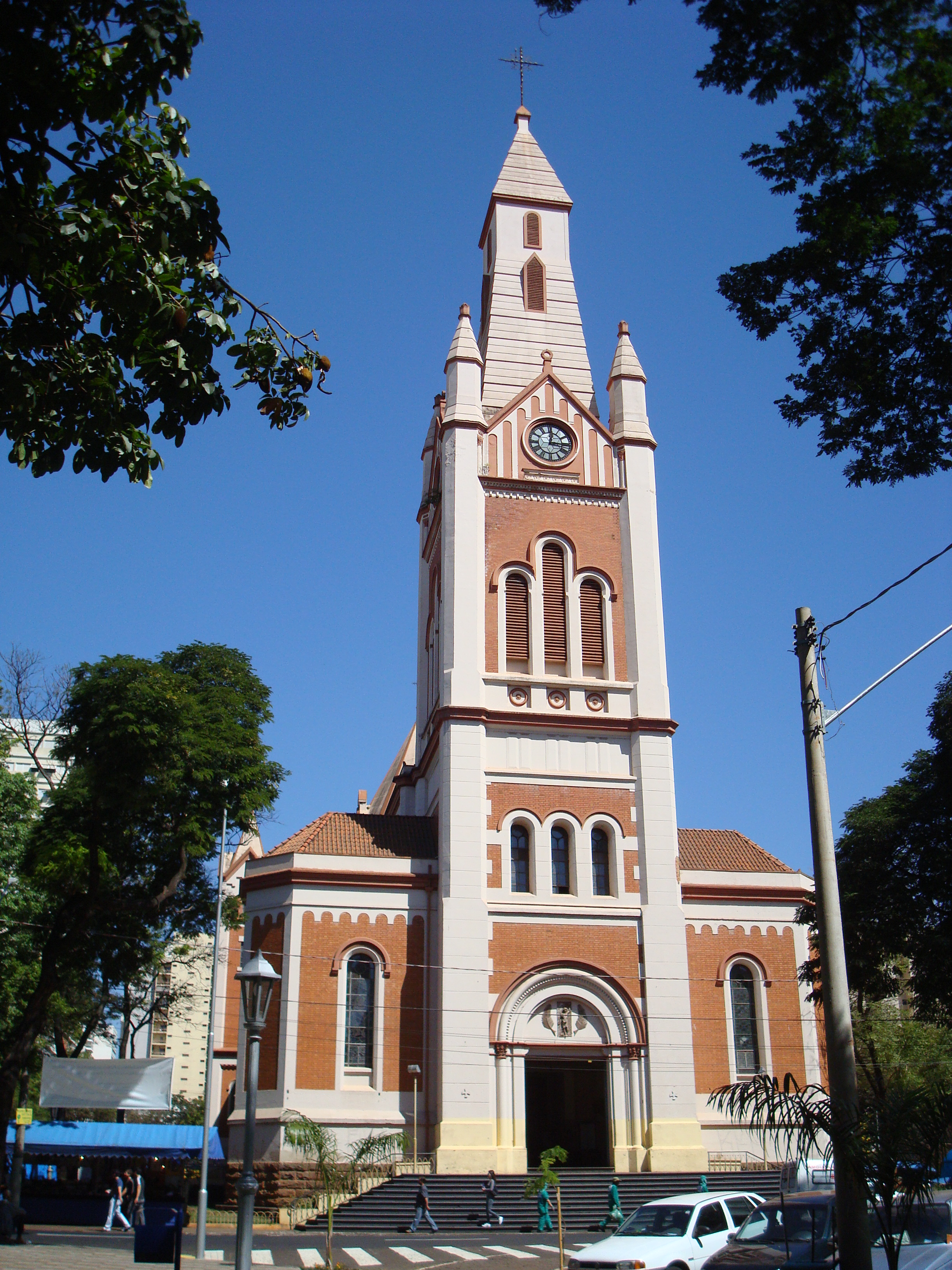
The seat of the Archdiocese of Ribeirão Preto is Catedral Metropolitana São Sebastião.

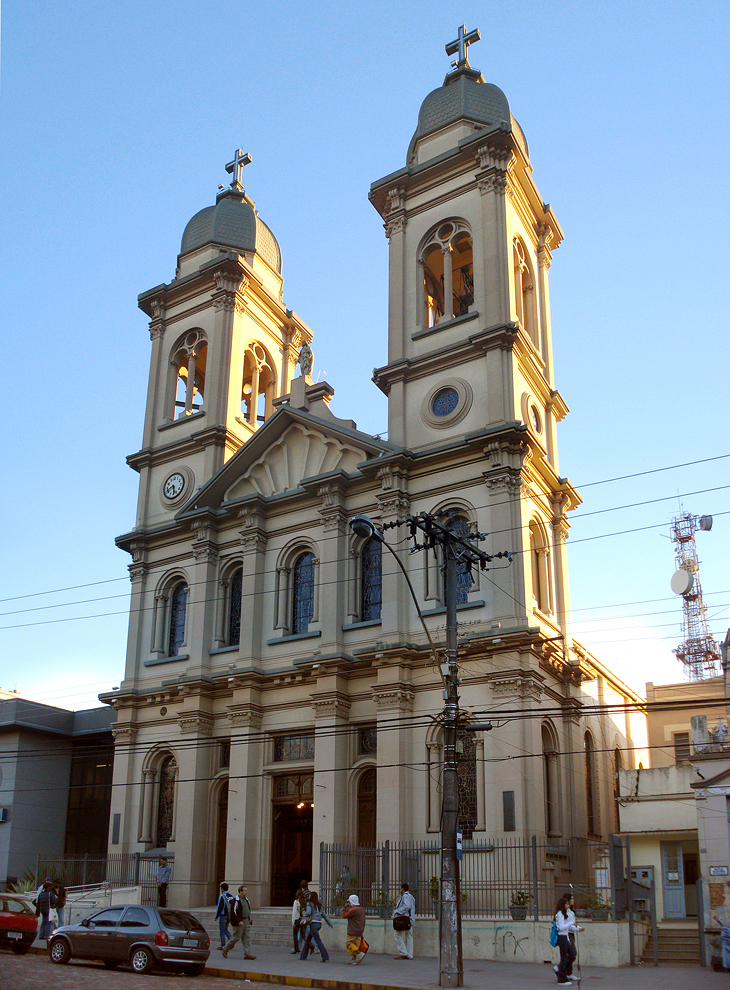
The seat of the Archdiocese of Santa Maria is Catedral Imaculada Conceição.

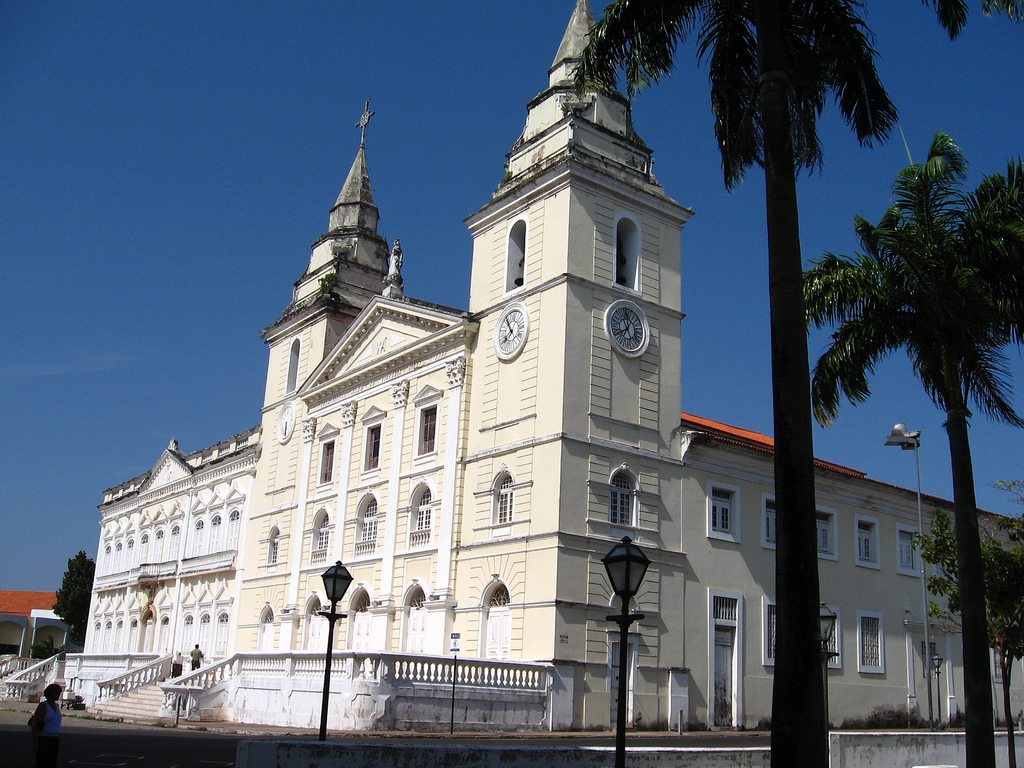
The seat of the Archdiocese of São Luís do Maranhão is Catedral Metropolitana Nossa Senhora da Vitória.

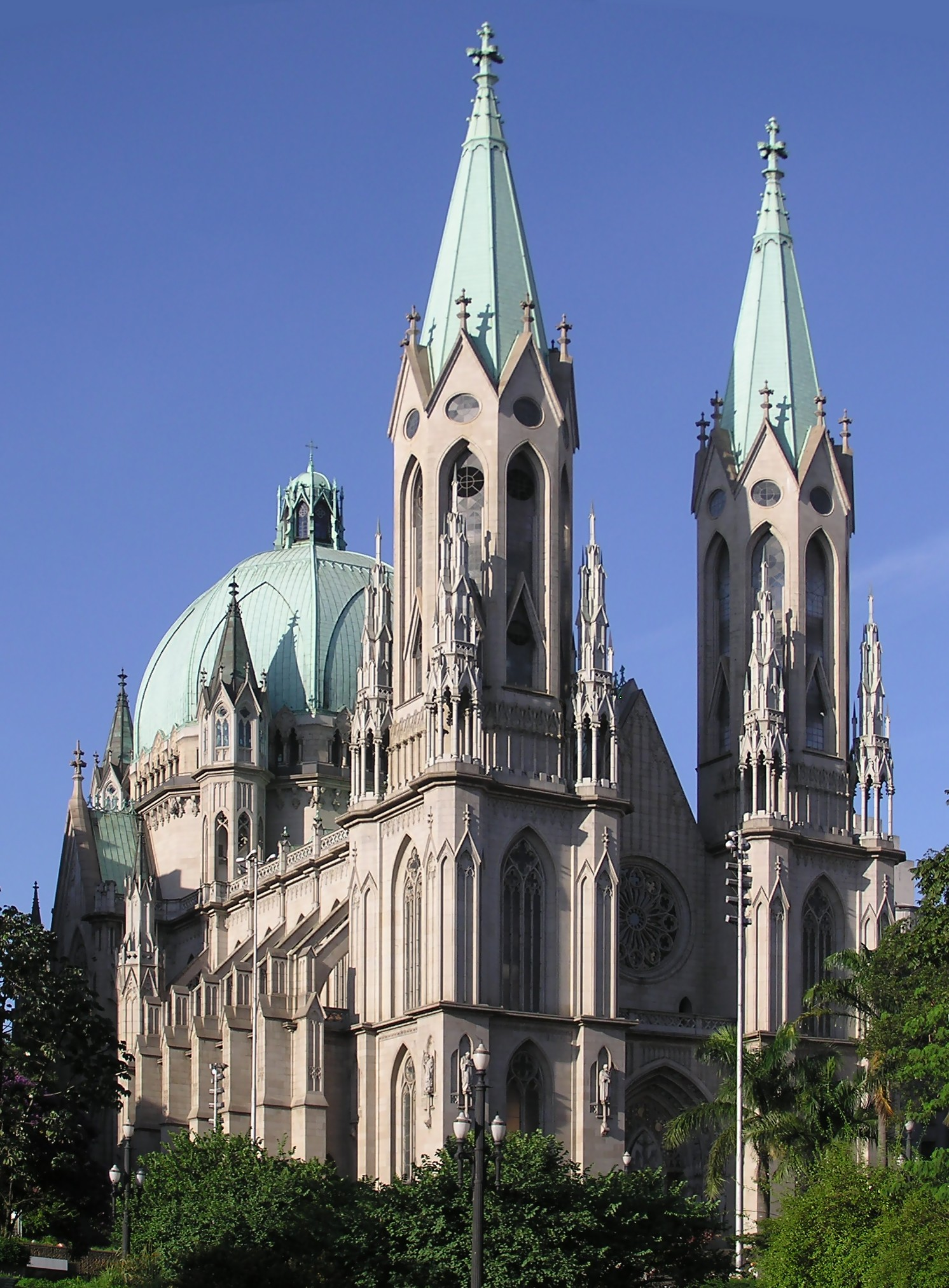
The seat of the Archdiocese of São Paulo is Catedral Metropolitana Nossa Senhora da Assunção e São Paulo.

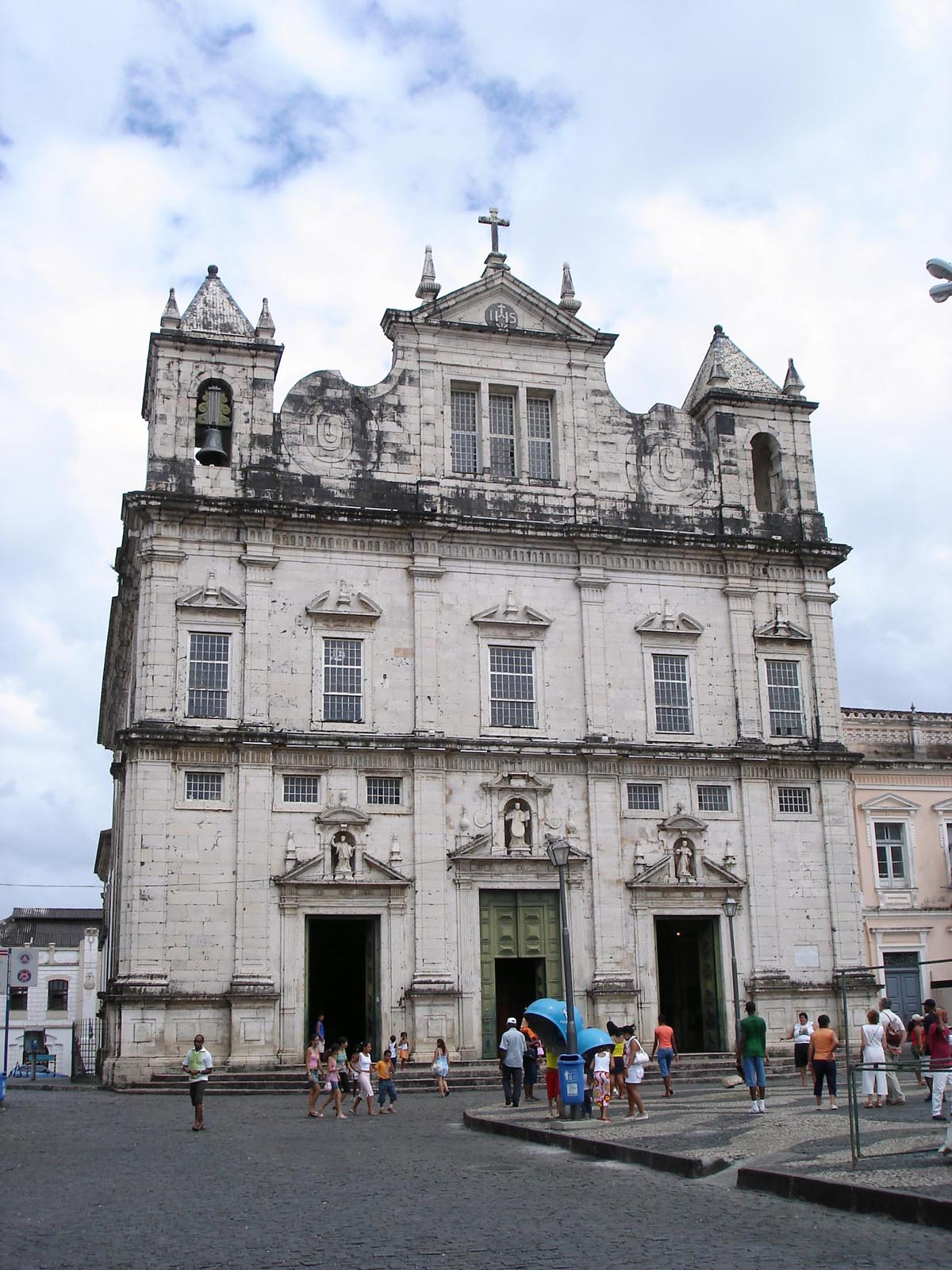
The seat of the Archdiocese of São Salvador da Bahia is Catedral Basílica Primacial do Transfiguração do Senhor.

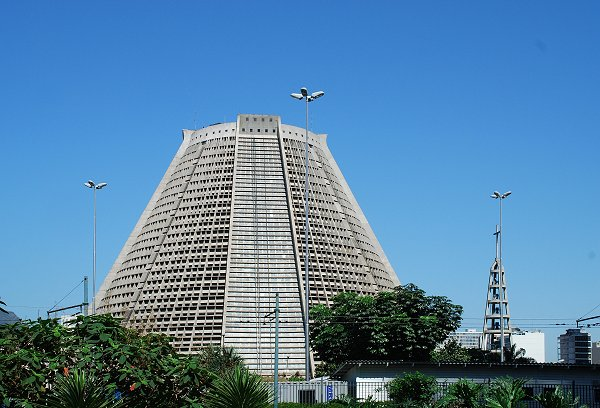
The seat of the Archdiocese of São Sebastião do Rio de Janeiro is Catedral Metropolitana de São Sebastião.

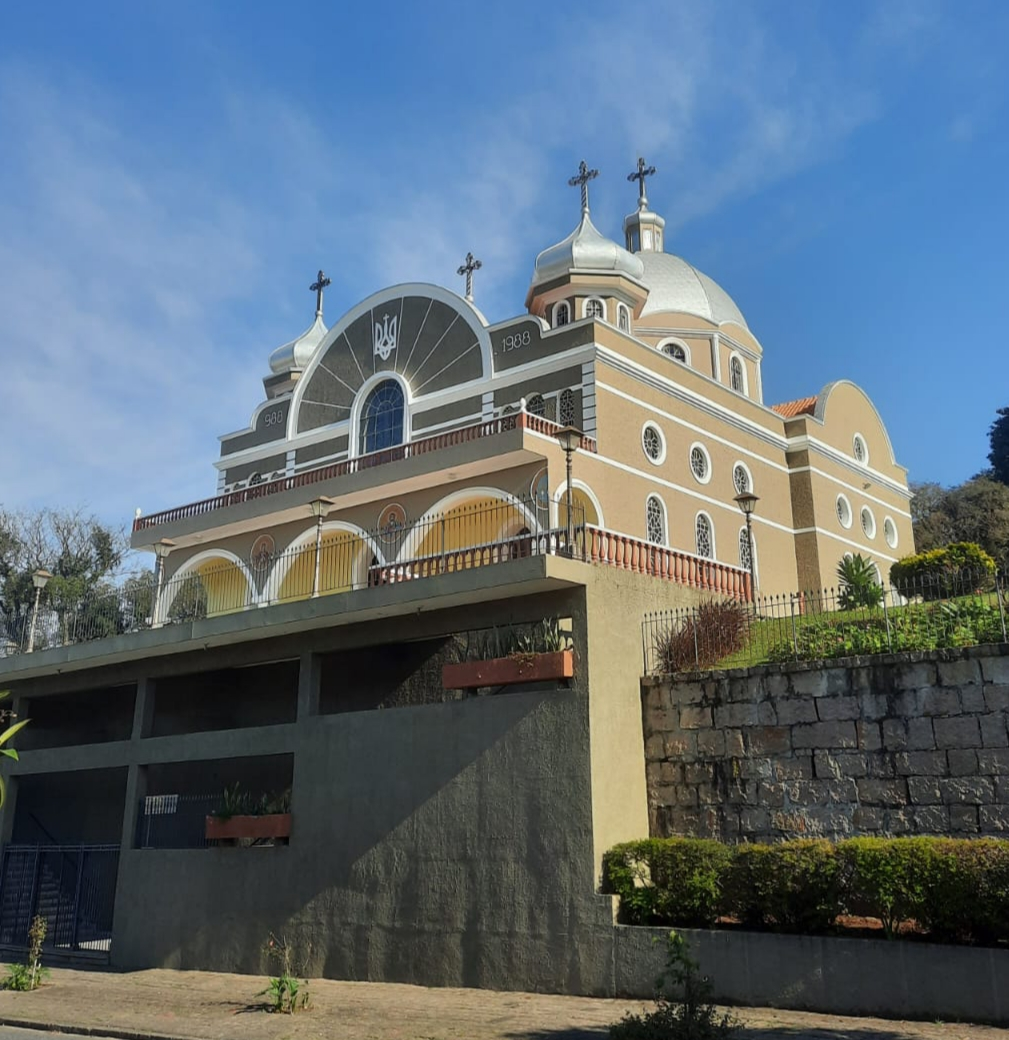
The seat of the Ukrainian Catholic Archeparchy of São João Batista em Curitiba is Cathedral of St John the Baptist in Curitiba.

== References and external links ==
- Catholic-Hierarchy entry.
- GCatholic.org.

Citations
