= Geraldo Lyrio Rocha =

Brazilian Roman Catholic archbishop (1942–2023)

His Excellency Geraldo Lyrio Rocha
- Archbishop Emeritus of Mariana
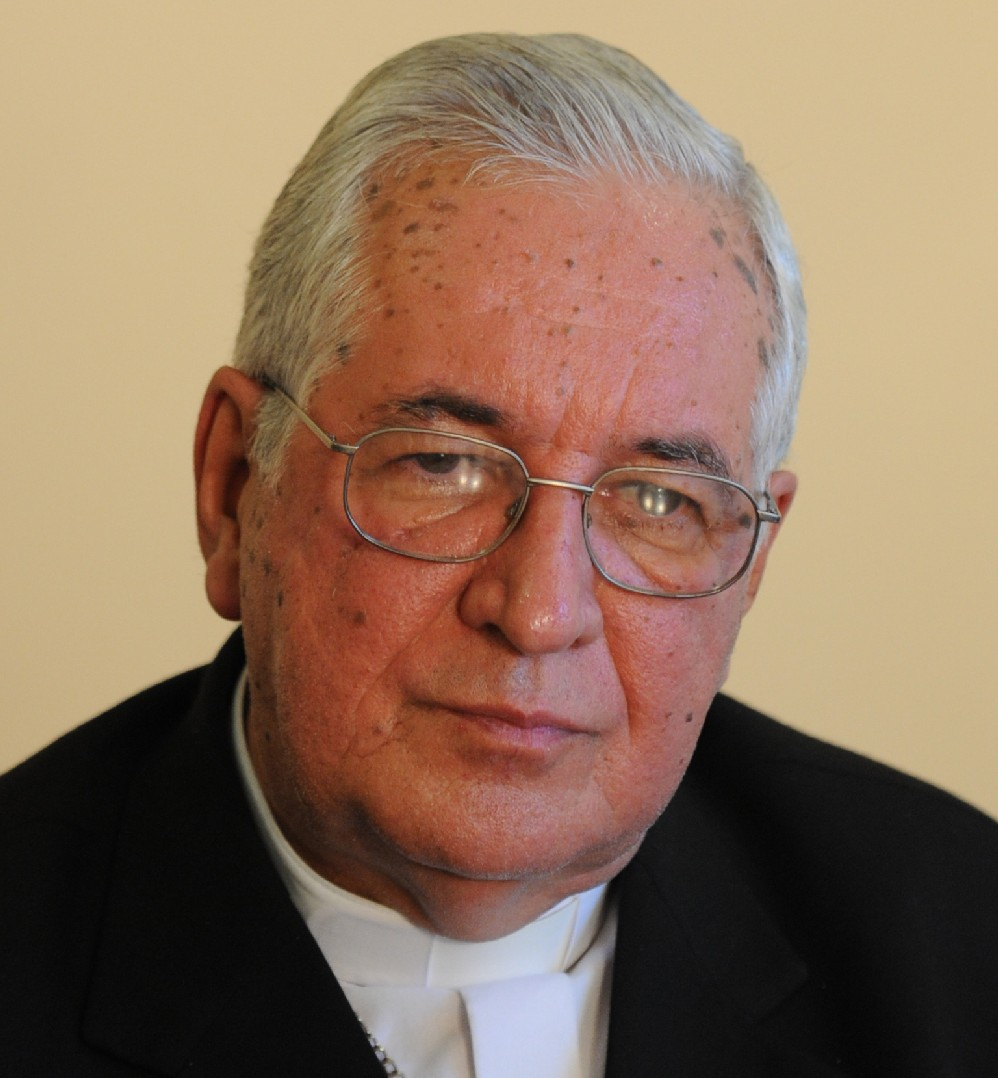
- See: Mariana
- Appointed: 11 April 2007
- Installed: 23 June 2007
- Term ended: 25 April 2018
- Predecessor: Luciano Pedro Mendes de Almeida
- Successor: Airton José dos Santos
- Previous posts: Auxiliary Bishop of Vitória and Titular Bishop of Thelepte (1984–1990); Bishop of Colatina (1990–2002); Archbishop of Vitória da Conquista (2002–2007)

Orders
- Ordination: 15 August 1967
- Consecration: 31 May 1984 by Silvestre Luís Scandián

Personal details
- Born: 14 March 1942 Fundão, Espírito Santo, Brazil
- Died: 26 July 2023 (aged 81) Altamira, Pará, Brazil

Geraldo Lyrio Rocha (14 March 1942 – 26 July 2023) was a Brazilian Roman Catholic prelate. He served as bishop of Colatina from 1990 to 2002, archbishop of Vitória da Conquista from 2002 to 2007 and Mariana from 2007 to 2018.

== Priesthood ==
On 15 August 1967, Rocha was ordained a priest and incardinated in the Archdiocese of Vitória. He had held the positions of spiritual father, then rector of the diocesan seminary (1967–1983), director of the local Pastoral Institute and pastoral coordinator in the archdiocese (1968–1976).

== Episcopate ==
On 14 March 1984, Rocha was appointed auxiliary bishop of the Archdiocese of Vitória, with the titular see of Thelepte. He was consecrated bishop on 31 May by Archbishop Silvestre Luís Scandián. On 23 April 1990, he was appointed Bishop of Colatina. On 16 January 2002, he was appointed archbishop of Vitória da Conquista, in the state of Bahia. The swear in took place on 17 March.

On 11 April 2007, Rocha was appointed by Pope Benedict XVI as Metropolitan Archbishop of Mariana. The canonical assumption of office took place on 23 June. Between 2003 and 2007, he was the 2nd vice-chairman of CELAM. From 2007 to 2011, he was the president of the Episcopal Conference of Brazil. On 25 April 2018, the pope accepted Rocha's resignation due to age.

== Death ==
Rocha died in Altamira on 26 July 2023, at the age of 81.

Catholic Church titles
Preceded by Luciano Pedro Mendes de Almeida	Archbishop of Mariana; 2007–2018	Succeeded by Airton José dos Santos
Preceded by Celso José Pinto da Silva	Archbishop of Vitória da Conquista; 2002–2007	Succeeded by Luis Gonzaga Silva Pepeu
Preceded by First	Bishop of Colatina; 1990–2002	Succeeded by Décio Sossai Zandonade
Preceded by Paulo Lopes de Faria	Titular Bishop of Thelepte; 1984–1990	Succeeded by Jean-Louis Pierre Tauran
Preceded by —	Auxiliary Bishop of Vitória; 1984–1990	Succeeded by —
