= Diocese of Livramento de Nossa Senhora =

Catholic ecclesiastical territory

Coordinates: 13.6502°S 41.8411°W

Diocese of Livramento de Nossa Senhora Dioecesis Liberationis Marianae

Catholic

Location
- Country: Brazil
- Ecclesiastical province: Vitória da Conquista

Statistics
- Area: 24,890 km^{2} (9,610 sq mi)
- Population: Total; Catholics: (as of 2004); 269,071; 233,878 (86.9%)

Information
- Denomination: Catholic Church
- Rite: Latin Rite
- Established: 27 February 1967 (59 years ago)
- Cathedral: Catedral Nossa Senhora do Livramento

Current leadership
- Pope: Leo XIV
- Bishop: Vicente de Paula Ferreira, C.Ss.R.
- Metropolitan Archbishop: Vítor Agnaldo de Menezes
- Bishops emeritus: Armando Bucciol

The Roman Catholic Diocese of Livramento de Nossa Senhora (Latin: Dioecesis Liberationis Marianae) is a diocese located in the city of Livramento de Nossa Senhora (Bahia state) in the ecclesiastical province of Vitória da Conquista in Brazil.

== History ==
- 27 February 1967: Established as Diocese of Livramento de Nossa Senhora from the Diocese of Caetité

== Leadership ==
- Bishops of Livramento de Nossa Senhora (Roman rite)
  - Bishop Hélio Paschoal, C.S.S. (1967.03.29 – 2004.01.21), retired
  - Bishop Armando Bucciol (2004.01.21 – 2023.02.01), retired
  - Bishop Vicente de Paula Ferreira, C.Ss.R. (2023.02.01 – Present)
