= Antônio Alberto Guimarães Rezende =

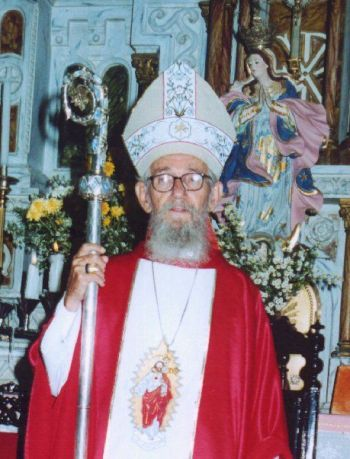
Antônio Alberto Guimarães Rezende

Antônio Alberto Guimarães Rezende (March 3, 1926 – April 13, 2015) was a Catholic bishop.

Ordained to the priesthood in 1953, Guimarãres Rezende was named bishop of the Diocese of Caetité, Brazil in 1982 and retired in 2002.
