= Casa da Lagoa =

19th-century farmhouse in Bahia, Brazil

General information
- Architectural style: Neoclassical
- Location: Livramento de Nossa Senhora, Bahia, Brazil
- Inaugurated: 1800s

Technical details
- Floor count: 1

Casa da Lagoa is a 19th-century farmhouse in Livramento de Nossa Senhora, Bahia, Brazil. The house was built by Dr. José de Aquino Tanajura (1831–1918), a physician and state senator. Tanajura left the property to his children and remains in possession of the family. The house is located on the Bom Jardim de São José Farm (Portuguese: Fazenda Bom Jardim de São José), in a valley 4.5 kilometres (2.8 mi) from the city center of Livramento. It has a single floor and covers 409 square metres (4,400 ft^{2}). The house is a listed historic structure by the Artistic and Cultural Institute of Bahia (IPAC).

== Structure ==
The farmhouse consists of a single-floor, L-shaped structure divided into 12 rooms. The facade of the house has an arched doorway with eleven arched windows. Casa da Lagoa, like other farmhouses of the period, had two larger rooms at the front of the house to receive guests and a dining room to the rear of the home reserved for the family. The home has an interior chapel in a small room to the left of the entrance. A kitchen and veranda at the rear of the home. The facade and chapel have elements of Neoclassical architecture. The chapel had a polychrome painting and a retable typical of the 19th century. The entirety of the house has a floor of baked clay tile.

== Protected status ==
Casa da Lagoa was listed as a historic structure by the Artistic and Cultural Institute of Bahia (IPAC) in 2001.

== Access ==
Casa da Lagoa is a private residence and may not be visited.
