= Diocese of Colatina =

Catholic ecclesiastical territory

Coordinates: 19.5375°S 40.6305°W

Diocese of Colatina Dioecesis Colatinensis

Catholic

Location
- Country: Brazil
- Ecclesiastical province: Vitória

Statistics
- Area: 12,362 km^{2} (4,773 sq mi)
- Population: Total; Catholics: (as of 2006); 516,344; 411,226 (79.6%)

Information
- Rite: Latin Rite
- Established: 23 April 1990 (36 years ago)
- Cathedral: Catedral Sagrado Coração de Jesus

Current leadership
- Pope: Leo XIV
- Bishop: Lauro Sérgio Versiani Barbosa
- Metropolitan Archbishop: Ângelo Ademir Mezzari
- Bishops emeritus: Décio Zandonade, S.D.B.

Website
- www.diocesedecolatina.org.br

The Roman Catholic Diocese of Colatina (Latin: Dioecesis Colatinensis) is a diocese located in the city of Colatina in the ecclesiastical province of Vitória in Brazil.

== History ==
- 23 April 1990: Established as Diocese of Colatina from the Metropolitan Archdiocese of Vitória

== Leadership ==
- Bishops of Colatina (Roman rite)
  - Bishop Geraldo Lyrio Rocha (later Archbishop) (1990.04.23 – 2002.01.16)
  - Bishop Décio Zandonade, S.D.B. (2003.05.14 – 2014.05.14)
  - Bishop Joaquim Wladimir Lopes Dias (2015.03.04 – 2021.01.13)
  - Bishop Lauro Sérgio Versiani Barbosa (2021.10.27 – present)
