= Celso José Pinto da Silva =

Brazilian Roman Catholic archbishop (1933–2018)

- Archbishop of Teresina
- Church: Catholic Church
- Archdiocese: Archdiocese of Teresina
- In office: 21 February 2001 – 3 September 2008
- Predecessor: Miguel Fenelon Câmara Filho
- Successor: Sérgio da Rocha
- Previous posts: Bishop of Vitória da Conquista (1981-2001); Titular Bishop of Urusi (1978-1981); Auxiliary Bishop of Rio de Janeiro (1978-1981)

Orders
- Ordination: 14 March 1959
- Consecration: 1 May 1978 by Eugênio Sales

Personal details
- Born: 29 October 1933 Rio de Janeiro, Federal District, Republic of the United States of Brazil
- Died: 28 September 2018 (aged 84) Teresina, Piauí, Brazil

Celso José Pinto da Silva (29 October 1933 – 28 September 2018) was a Brazilian Roman Catholic archbishop.

Pinto da Silva was born in Brazil and was ordained to the priesthood in 1959. He served as titular bishop of Urusi and as auxiliary bishop of the Roman Catholic Archdiocese of São Sebastião do Rio de Janeiro, Brazil, from 1978 to 1981. Pinto da Silva then served as bishop of the Roman Catholic Archdiocese of Vitória da Conquista from 1981 to 2001. He then served as archbishop of the Roman Catholic Archdiocese of Teresina from 2001 to 2008.
