= Diocese of Jequié =

Catholic ecclesiastical territory

Coordinates: 13.8573°S 40.0837°W

Diocese of Jequié Dioecesis Iequieana

Catholic
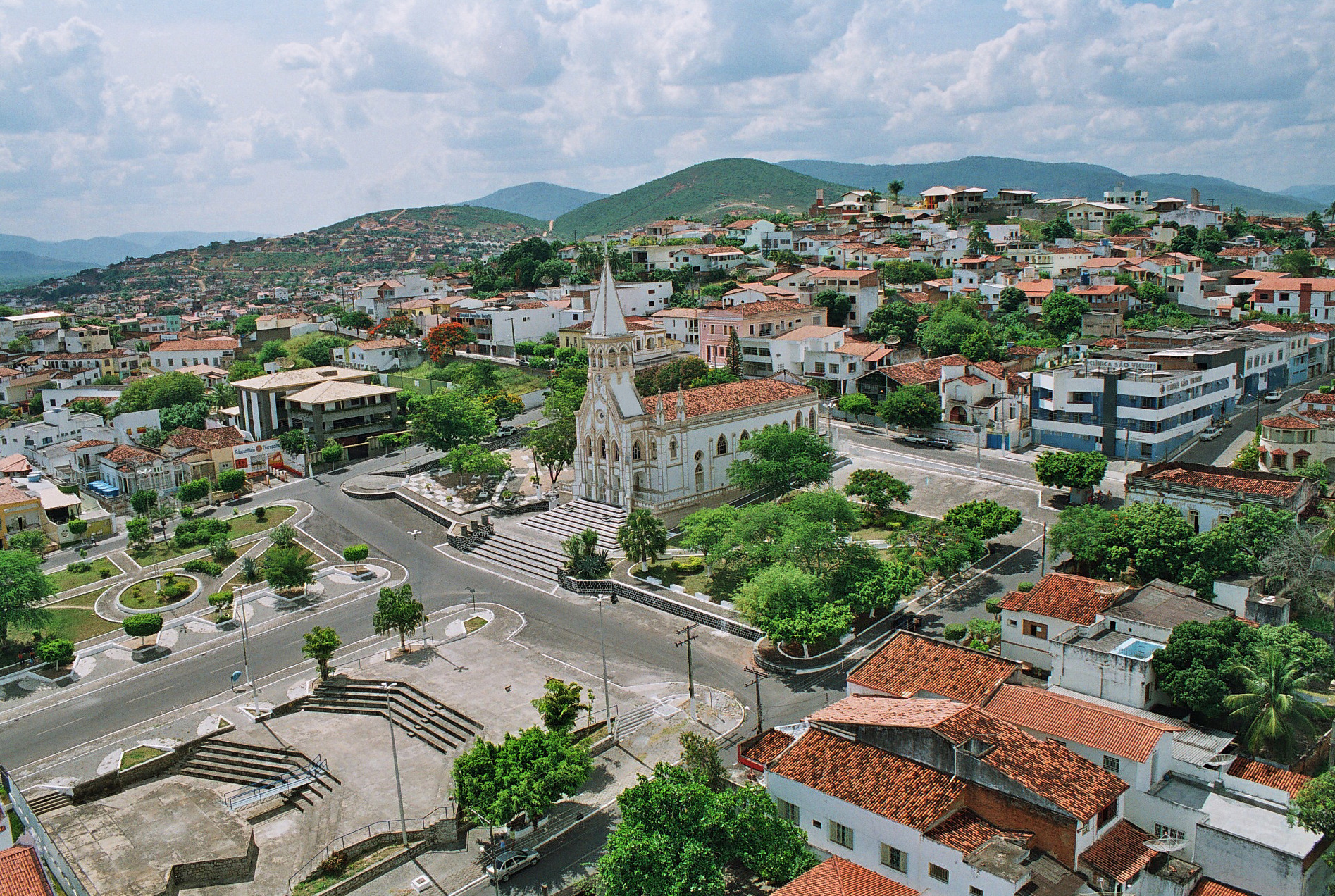
- Catedral Santo Antônio de Pádua in 2006

Location
- Country: Brazil
- Ecclesiastical province: Vitória da Conquista

Statistics
- Area: 18,771 km^{2} (7,248 sq mi)
- Population: Total; Catholics: (as of 2004); 580,000; 500,000 (86.2%)

Information
- Denomination: Catholic Church
- Rite: Latin Rite
- Established: 7 November 1978 (47 years ago)
- Cathedral: Catedral Santo Antônio de Pádua

Current leadership
- Pope: Leo XIV
- Bishop: Paulo Romeu Dantas Bastos
- Metropolitan Archbishop: Vítor Agnaldo de Menezes
- Bishops emeritus: Cristiano Jakob Krapf

Website
- www.diocesedejequie.com.br

The Roman Catholic Diocese of Jequié (Latin: Dioecesis Iequieana) is a diocese located in the city of Jequié in the ecclesiastical province of Vitória da Conquista in Brazil.

== History ==
- 7 November 1978: Established as Diocese of Jequié from the Diocese of Amargosa and Diocese of Vitória da Conquista

== Bishops ==
- Bishops of Jequié (Roman rite)
  - Cristiano Jakob Krapf (1978.11.07 – 2012.07.04), retired
  - José Ruy Gonçalves Lopes, O.F.M. Cap. (2012.07.04 – 2010.07.10), appointed Bishop of Caruaru, Pernambuco
  - Paulo Romeu Dantas Bastos (2021.01.13 – Present)

=== Other priests of this diocese who became bishops ===
- Antônio Tourinho Neto, appointed Auxiliary Bishop of Olinda e Recife, Pernambuco in 2014
- Vítor Agnaldo de Menezes, appointed Bishop of Propriá, Sergipe in 2017
