= Livramento de Nossa Senhora =

Municipality of Bahia, Brazil

- Municipality
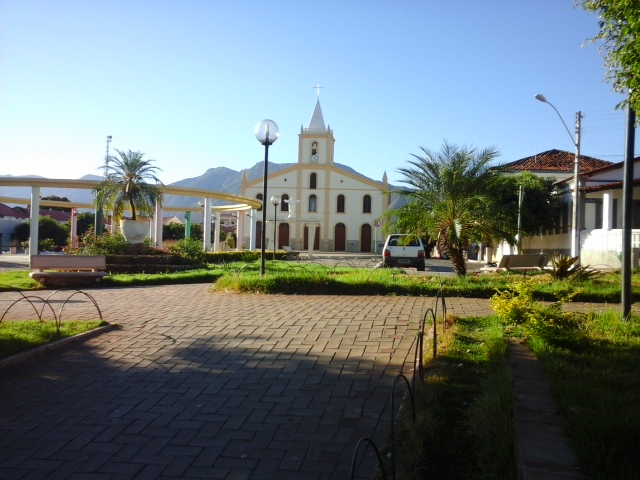

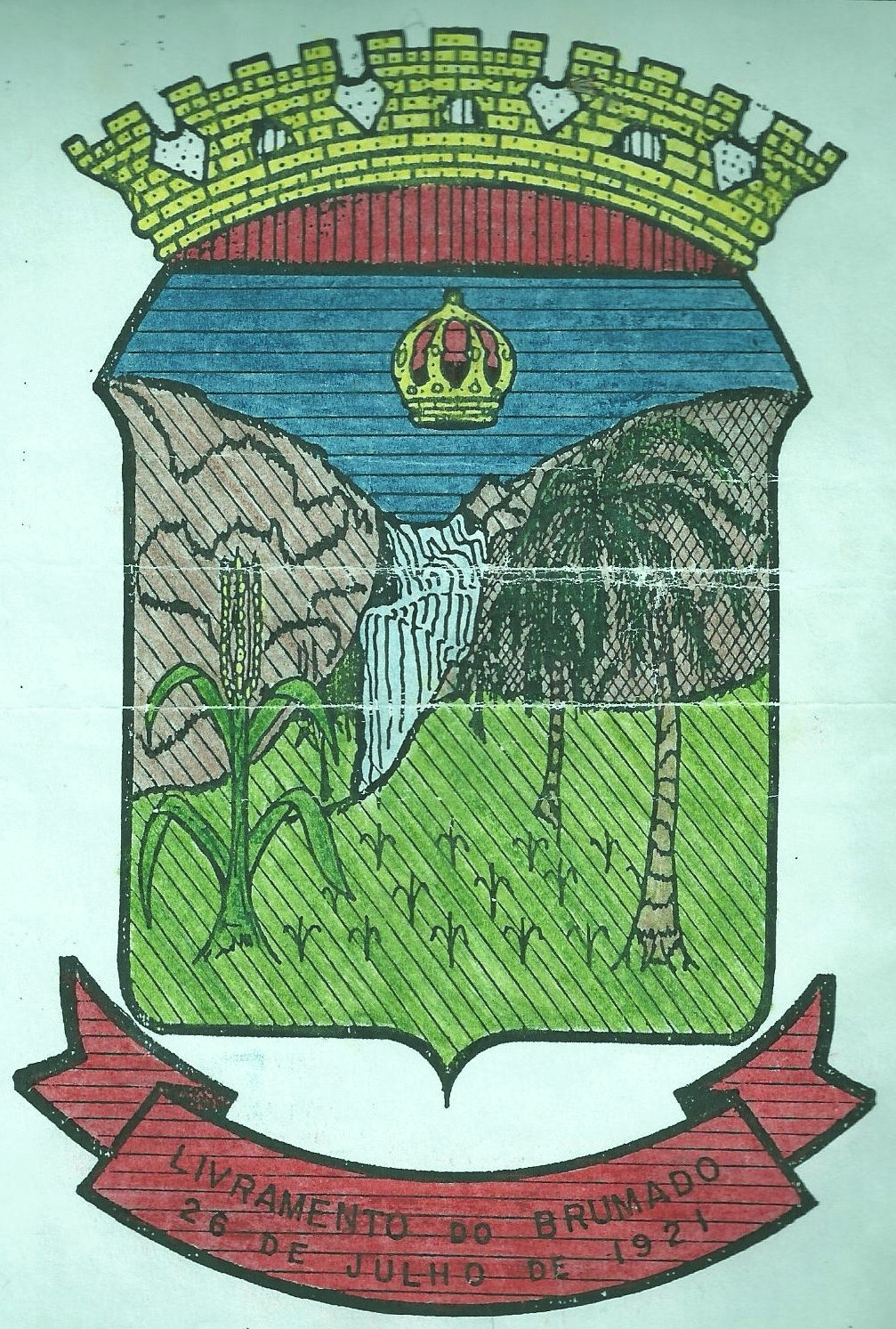
- Flag Coat of arms
- Interactive map of Livramento de Nossa Senhora
- Coordinates: 13°38′34″S 41°50′27″W
- Country: Brazil
- Region: Nordeste
- State: Bahia

Population (2020)
  - Total: 46,062
- Time zone: UTC−3 (BRT)

Livramento de Nossa Senhora is a municipality in the state of Bahia in the North-East region of Brazil.

== Historic structures ==
Casa da Lagoa is a protected historic structure to the east of the city center of Livramento. It was built by José de Aquino Tanajura (1831—1918), a physician and state senator, in the middle of the 19th century.

== See also ==
- List of municipalities in Bahia
