= Archdiocese of Vitória da Conquista =

Catholic ecclesiastical territory

Coordinates: 14.8494°S 40.8377°W

Archdiocese of Vitória da Conquista Archidioecesis Victoriensis de Conquista

Catholic
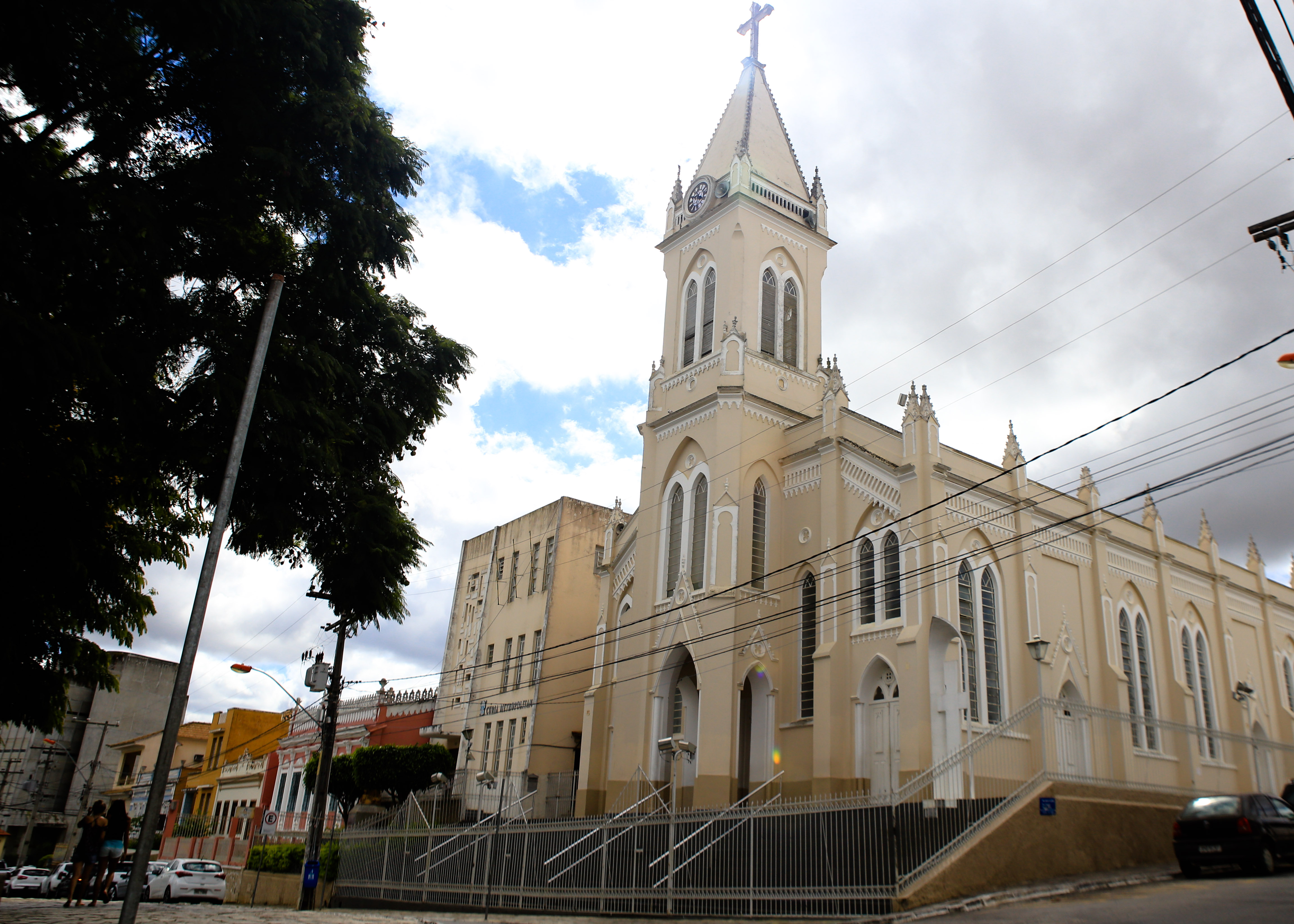
- Metropolitan Cathedral of Our Lady of Victories

- Coat of arms

Location
- Country: Brazil
- Ecclesiastical province: Vitória da Conquista

Statistics
- Area: 24,709 km^{2} (9,540 sq mi)
- Population: Total; Catholics: (as of 2004); 724,619; 542,249 (74.8%)

Information
- Rite: Latin Rite
- Established: 27 July 1957 (69 years ago)
- Cathedral: Catedral Metropolitana Nossa Senhora das Vitórias

Current leadership
- Pope: Leo XIV
- Archbishop: Vítor Agnaldo de Menezes

Website
- arquiconquista.org.br

The Roman Catholic Archdiocese of Vitória da Conquista (Latin: Archidioecesis Victoriensis de Conquista) is an archdiocese located in the city of Vitória da Conquista in Brazil.

== History ==
- 27 July 1957: Established as Diocese of Vitória da Conquista from the Diocese of Amargosa
- 16 January 2002: Promoted as Metropolitan Archdiocese of Vitória da Conquista

== Bishops ==
Bishops of Vitória da Conquista

- Jackson Berenguer Prado (1958.04.16 – 1962.09.24)
- Climério Almeida de Andrade (1962.09.24 – 1981.05.24)
- Celso José Pinto da Silva (1981.07.04 – 2001.02.21), appointed Archbishop of Teresina, Piaui

Archbishops of Vitória da Conquista

- Geraldo Lyrio Rocha (2002.01.16 – 2007.04.11), appointed Archbishop of Mariana, Minas Gerais
- Luís Gonzaga Silva Pepeu, OFMCap (11 June 2008 - 9 October 2019)
- Josafá Menezes da Silva (2019.10.09 – 2024.03.13) appointed Archbishop of Aracajú, Sergipe
- Vítor Agnaldo de Menezes (2025.02.14 – present)

=== Other priests of this diocese who became bishops ===
- Zanoni Demettino Castro, appointed Bishop of São Mateus, Espirito Santo in 2007
- Valdemir Ferreira dos Santos, appointed Bishop of Floriano, Piaui in 2010
- João Santos Cardoso, appointed Bishop of São Raimundo Nonato, Piaui in 2011
- Estevam dos Santos Silva Filho, appointed Auxiliary Bishop of São Salvador da Bahia in 2014
- José Roberto Silva Carvalho, appointed Bishop of Caetité, Bahia in 2016

== Suffragan dioceses ==
- Diocese of Bom Jesus da Lapa
- Diocese of Caetité
- Diocese of Jequié
- Diocese of Livramento de Nossa Senhora

== Sources ==
- GCatholic.org
- Catholic Hierarchy
- Archdiocese website (Portuguese)
