= Diocese of Caetité =

Catholic ecclesiastical territory

Coordinates: 14.0692°S 42.4850°W

Diocese of Caetité Dioecesis Caëtitensis

Catholic
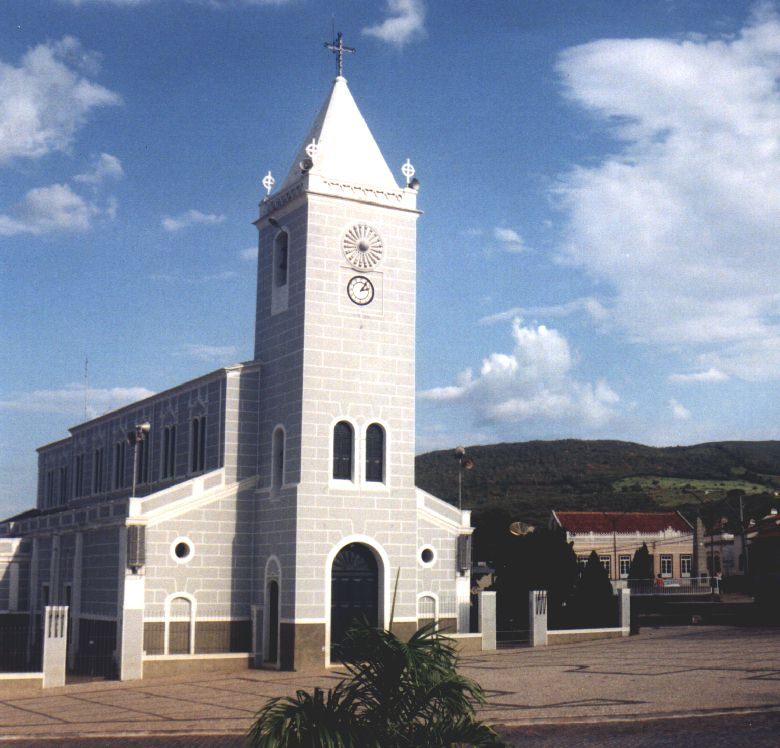
- Cathedral of St. Ann

Location
- Country: Brazil
- Ecclesiastical province: Vitória da Conquista

Statistics
- Area: 41,740 km^{2} (16,120 sq mi)
- Population: Total; Catholics: (as of 2004); 678,221; 618,351 (91.2%)

Information
- Rite: Latin Rite
- Established: 20 October 1913 (112 years ago)
- Cathedral: Catedral Sant’Ana

Current leadership
- Pope: Leo XIV
- Bishop: José Roberto Silva Carvalho
- Metropolitan Archbishop: Josafá Menezes da Silva

The Roman Catholic Diocese of Caetité (Latin: Dioecesis Caëtitensis) is a diocese located in the city of Caetité in the ecclesiastical province of Vitória da Conquista in Brazil.

== History ==
- 20 October 1913: Established as Diocese of Caetité from the Metropolitan Archdiocese of São Salvador da Bahia

== Leadership ==
- Bishops of Caetité (Roman rite), in reverse chronological order
  - Bishop José Roberto Silva Carvalho (2016.10.26 - present)
  - Bishop Riccardo Guerrino Brusati (2002.11.13 – 2015.05.27), appointed Bishop of Janaúba, Minas Gerais
  - Bishop Antônio Alberto Guimarães Rezende, C.S.S. (1981.11.09 – 2002.11.13)
  - Bishop Eliseu Maria Gomes de Oliveira, O. Carm. (1974.02.05 – 1980.09.24), appointed Bishop of Itabuna, Bahia
  - Bishop Silvério Paulo de Albuquerque, O.F.M. (1970.03.17 – 1973.01.18), appointed Bishop of Feira de Santana, Bahia
  - Bishop José Pedro de Araújo Costa (1957.05.25 – 1968.12.28), appointed Coadjutor Archbishop of Uberaba, Minas Gerais
  - Bishop José Terceiro de Sousa (1948.02.13 – 1955.12.09)
  - Bishop Juvêncio de Brito (1926.12.23 – 1945.12.15), appointed Bishop of Garanhuns, Pernambuco
  - Bishop Manoel Raymundo de Mello (1914.08.18 – 1923.07.30), appointed Bishop of Stobi, North Macedonia
