= Augusto Alves da Rocha =

Brazilian Roman Catholic prelate (1933–2026)

- Bishop Emeritus of Floriano
- Church: Catholic Church
- Archdiocese: Teresina
- Diocese: Floriano
- Appointed: 18 May 2008
- Term ended: 17 March 2010
- Predecessor: Diocese created
- Successor: Valdemir Ferreira dos Santos
- Other posts: Bishop of Picos (1975–2001); Bishop of Oeiras–Floriano (2001–2008)

Orders
- Ordination: 21 February 1960
- Consecration: 23 August 1975 by Edilberto Dinkelborg, Paulo Hipólito de Souza Libório and Joaquim Rufino do Rêgo

Personal details
- Born: 17 July 1933 Bertolínia, Piauí, Brazil
- Died: 12 November 2026 (aged 93) Brasília, Brazil
- Education: Pontifical Gregorian University
- Motto: In fide fundati
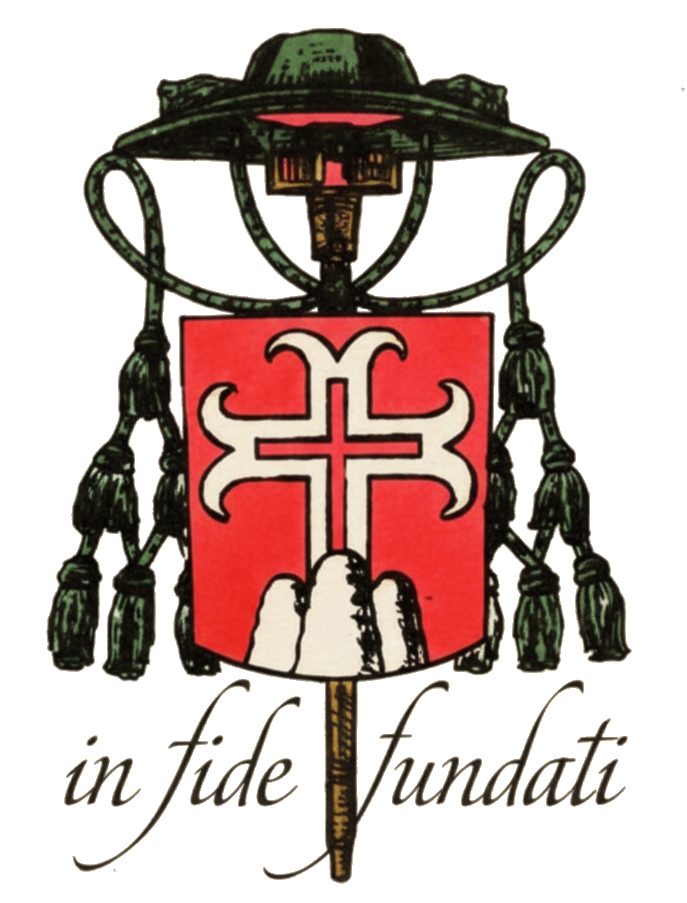
- Coat of arms: Augusto Alves da Rocha's coat of arms

Augusto Alves da Rocha (17 July 1933 – 12 November 2026) was a Brazilian Roman Catholic prelate. He served as the first Bishop of Picos from 1975 to 2001, Bishop of Oeiras-Floriano from 2001 to 2008, and subsequently the first Bishop of Floriano from 2008 until his retirement in 2010.

== Early life and priesthood ==
Augusto Alves da Rocha was born on 17 July 1933 in Bertolínia, in the state of Piauí, Brazil. He attended preparatory studies in Teresina and in the diocese of Crato, and those of philosophy and theology at the Pontifical Gregorian University, as a student of the Pio Brazilian College and was ordained a priest on 21 February 1960.

== Episcopal ministry ==
On 23 May 1975, Pope Paul VI appointed Rocha as the first bishop of the newly created Diocese of Picos. He received his episcopal consecration on 23 August 1975 from Bishop Edilberto Dinkelborg, OFM.

After 26 years of ministry in Picos, Pope John Paul II appointed him Bishop of Oeiras-Floriano on 24 October 2001.

On 27 February 2008, Pope Benedict XVI divided the Diocese of Oeiras-Floriano into two distinct jurisdictions: the Diocese of Oeiras and the Diocese of Floriano. Rocha was transferred to head the newly erected Diocese of Floriano as its first diocesan bishop. He was formally installed on 18 May 2008.

Pope Benedict XVI accepted his resignation from the pastoral governance of the Diocese of Floriano on 17 March 2010 upon reaching the customary retirement age. He was succeeded by Valdemir Ferreira dos Santos.

== Death ==
Alves da Rocha died on 12 November 2026, at the age of 93.

Catholic Church titles
Preceded by Diocese created	Bishop of Floriano; 2008–2010	Succeeded by Valdemir Ferreira dos Santos
Preceded by Fernando Panico	Bishop of Oeiras–Floriano; 2001–2008	Succeeded by Juarez Sousa Da Silva
Preceded by Diocese created	Bishop of Picos; 1975–2001	Succeeded by Plínio José Luz da Silva
