= Luciano José Cabral Duarte =

Brazilian Roman Catholic prelate (1925–2018)

His Eminence Dom Luciano José Cabral Duarte
- Archbishop of Aracaju
- Archdiocese: Aracaju

Personal details
- Born: Dom Luciano José Cabral Duarte; January 21, 1925 Aracaju, Brazil
- Died: May 29, 2018 Aracaju, Brazil
- Denomination: Roman Catholic Church
- Education: University Paris-Sorbonne (PhD); School of Aprendizes Artífices; (Technical School, today -Federal Institute of Education, Science and Technology of Sergipe); Minor Seminary of the Sacred Heart of Jesus

Luciano José Cabral Duarte (January 21, 1925 – May 29, 2018) was a Brazilian prelate of the Roman Catholic Church and professor. He served as auxiliary bishop of Aracajú from 1966 till 1971, when he became archbishop of Aracajú. He resigned in 1998 and was succeeded by José Palmeira Lessa. He was professor of philosophy and one of the founders at the Federal University of Sergipe.

== Life ==
Luciano José Cabral Duarte was the son of José de Góes Duarte and Célia Cabral. He was baptized in the Diocesan Cathedral, in Aracaju, on February 7, 1925.

He studied at the School of Apprentice Crafts, then Technical School, now IFS, before joining the Minor Seminary of the Sacred Heart of Jesus at the age of 11. He was always the first in the class. In 1942, he moved to the Seminary of Olinda, in Pernambuco. In February 1945 he transferred to St. Leopold (Rio Grande do Sul) where he completed the ecclesiastical studies necessary to become a priest.

He was ordained to the priesthood on January 18, 1948. On July 14, 1966, he was appointed auxiliary bishop of Aracajú and titular bishop of Gadiaufala. Palmeira Lessa received his episcopal consecration on the following October 2 from José Vicente Távora, archbishop of Aracajú, with the bishop of Estância, José Bezerra Coutinho, and the bishop of Propriá, José Brandão de Castro, serving as co-consecrators. He took the motto "Scio Cui Credidi". On February 12, 1971, he was appointed archbishop of Aracajú. He retired on August 26, 1998, and was succeeded by José Palmeira Lessa.

Cabral Duarte lived at his residence in Aracaju, due to his fragile state of health, until he died in the afternoon of May 29, 2018, at the age of 93.

== Publications ==
- Europa, Ver e Olhar. Aracaju : Sociedade de Cultura Artística De Sergipe/Livraria Regina, 1960
- Europa e Europeus. São Paulo: Livraria Edurora Flamboyant, 1961 (reedição de Europa, ver e Olhar)
- Viagem aos Estados Unidos. Aracaju: Sociedade Artística de Sergipe/ Livraria Regina, 1962
- Índia a Vôo de Pássaro. Aracaju : Sociedade Artística de Sergipe/Livraria Regina, 1970
- Estrada de Emaús. Petrópolis, RJ: Editora Vozes Ltda., 1971
- A Igreja às Portas do Ano 2000
- "La Nature de l'intelligence dans le thomisme et dans la philosophie de Hume"(Tese de doutorado em Filosofia, na Sorbone)
