= N'Gaous =

Town in Algeria

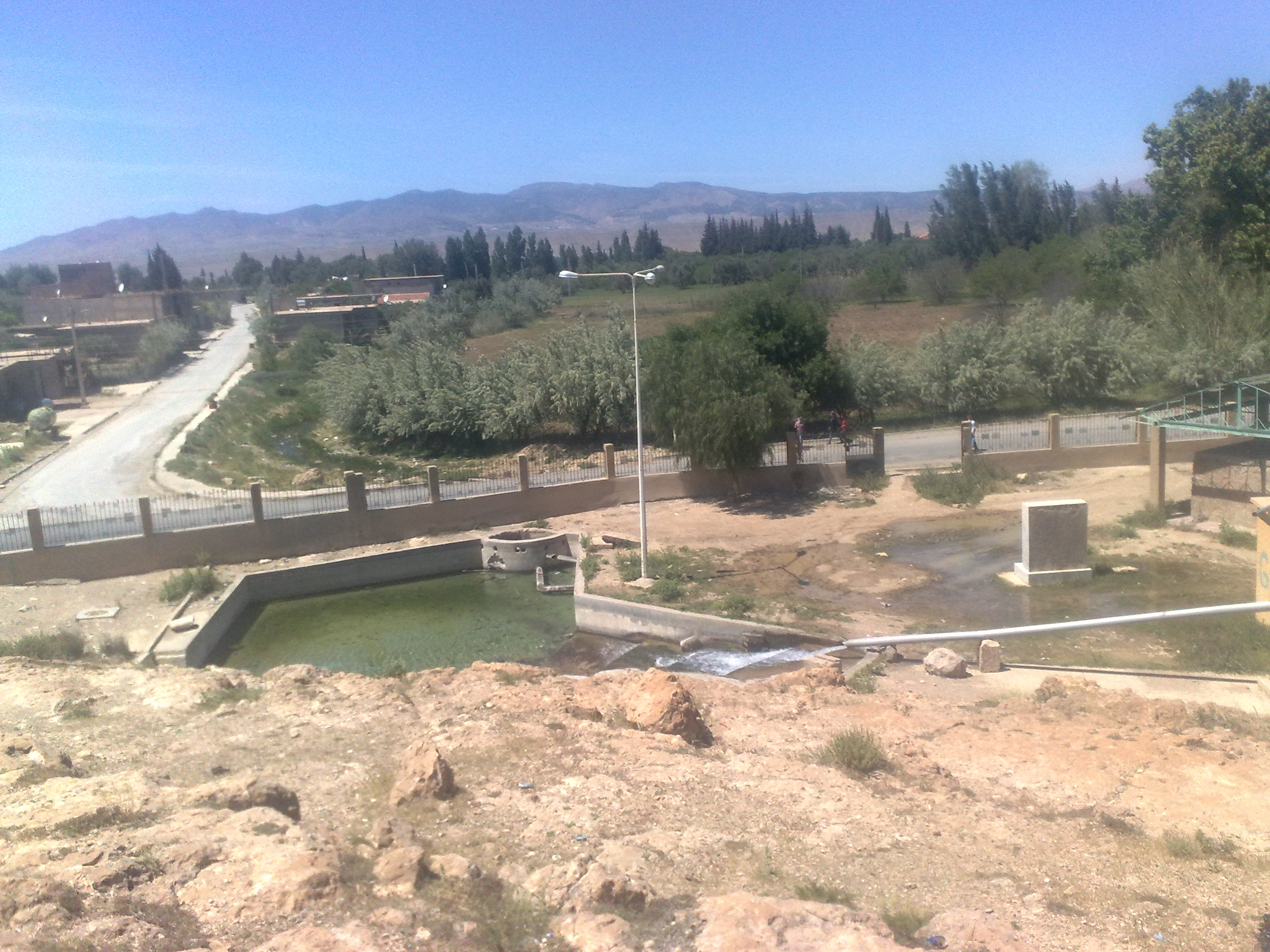
- Nickname: the bride of the Auras

- Location within Algeria
- Coordinates: 35°33′18″N 5°36′38″E
- Country: Algeria
- Province: Batna
- Elevation: 756 m (2,480 ft)

Population (2008)
  - Total: 29,504
- Time zone: UTC+1 (CET)

N'Gaous (Latin: Nicives or Nicivibus) is an ancient town in northeastern Algeria,

The city of N'Gaous is a city located southwest of the state of Batna, an area of 80.45 km, rising 770 meters above sea level. To the East it is surrounded by the green areas, and in the north-west it is surrounded by the Qatian Mountains, which have as their highest peak the summit of Ticherrit.

To the east is the city of Ain al-Touta and the peak at 2176 meters called: Rifaa.

The city celebrates the apricot festival on 19 June each year. It is famous for making apricot juice.

== Facilities ==
The city has access to most public facilities, ranging from postal and transportation services, health centers, sports hall to multi-sports, and many interests can not be summarized on this page, although we do not forget the means of transport available, whether local or the city and others.

== Climate ==
The lowest temperature recorded in a mountain was estimated at 7 °C below zero, in the winter of 1917, and the maximum temperature recorded in the summer of 1996, which reached 45 °C, and if we moved to the climatic factor, we find that the largest amount of rain known between the period from 1913 to 1973.

N'Gaous has cold and rainy winters and heat and drought in the summer, indeed the coldness is mentioned by ancient historians.

== History ==
Although of great antiquity, N'Gaous has not received much historical attention. N'Gaous is the site of the ancient city of Nicives or Nicivibus. Located in the late Roman province of Numidia, and which flourished through the Vandal Kingdom and Roman Empire into late antiquity. Nicives was deemed important enough to serve for a period as a suffragan bishopric.

In the Middle Ages the town was praised by travelers and noted for its nuts, apricot orchards and olive trees. Still known for its fruit, it has become center for it production since the introduction of abundant water, and the orchards, and this is contained in some travel books.

== Titular see ==
In Antiquity N'Gaous was the seat of a Christian bishopric which is presently a Roman Catholic titular see. Although it ceased to function with the Muslim conquest of the Maghreb in the 7th century, the diocese was nominally restored in 1933 as a titular bishopric.

It has had the following incumbents, of the fitting episcopal (lowest) rank:

- Angelo Félix Mugnol (1966.02.07 – 1969.01.15)
- Guillermo Escobar Vélez (1969.07.28 – 1971.01.22)
- Abel Alonso Núñez, Mercedarians (O. de M.) (1971.07.14 – 1976.03.24), as Auxiliary Bishop of then Territorial Prelature of Bom Jesus do Piauí (Brazil) (1971.07.14 – 1976.03.24), later Bishop of Campo Maior (Brazil) (1976.03.24 – retired 2000.02.02)
- Stanley Joseph Ott (1976.05.24 – 1983.01.13)
- José Mário Stroeher (1983.03.25 – 1986.08.08)
- William Jerome McCormack (1986.12.23 – 2013.11.23)
- Andrzej Jerzy Zglejszewski (2014.02.11 – ...), Auxiliary Bishop of Rockville Centre (USA)
