= St. Anthony Cathedral, Campo Maior =

St. Anthony Cathedral
- Catedral Santo Antônio
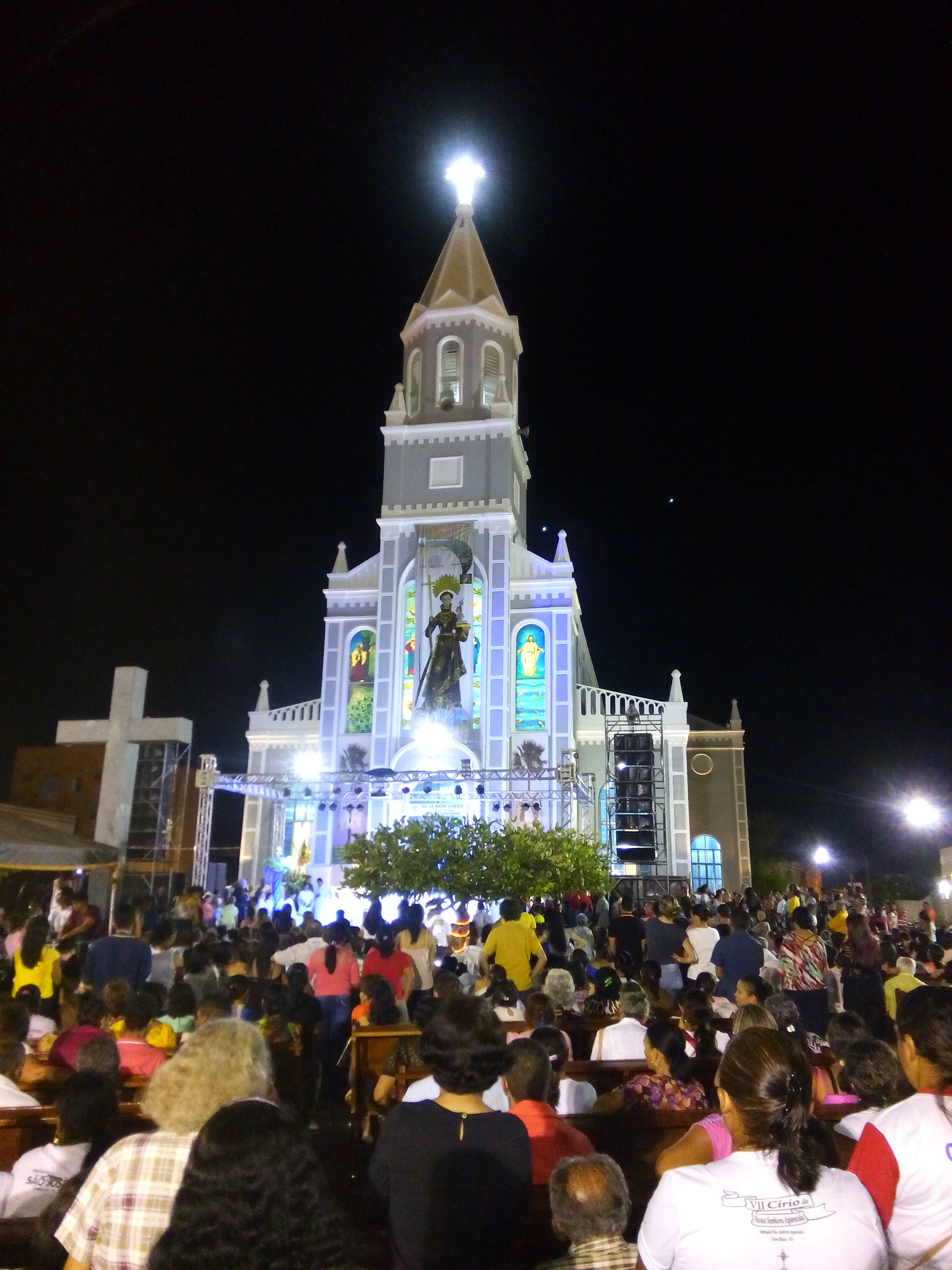
- St. Anthony Cathedral
- Location: Campo Maior
- Country: Brazil
- Denomination: Roman Catholic Church

Administration
- Archdiocese: Teresina
- Diocese: Campo Maior

The St. Anthony Cathedral (Portuguese: Catedral Santo Antônio), also known as Campo Maior Cathedral, is a Catholic church located in the Bona Primo Square in Campo Maior, in the state of Piauí, part of the South American country of Brazil. Since June 12, 1976, it is the episcopal cathedral of the Diocese of Campo Maior.

It was built under the command of Pastor Matthew Rufino on the ruins of the old chapel of St. Anthony, whose construction began in 1944 and was completed in 1962, in a commemorative act of the Bicentennial of Campo Maior. It is a monument of the same diocese of the same municipality.

On November 12, 2015, the Legislative Assembly of Piauí held a solemn session at the request of Mr. Aloisio Martins; On the same date, the Diocesan Major Museum Camp was inaugurated and in the evening the Mass was celebrated by the Archbishop of São Luis do Maranhão, Archbishop José Belisario da Silva in thanksgiving in front of the cathedral, referring to the three hundred years of the construction of the chapel in the place where the cathedral is today.

== See also ==
- Roman Catholicism in Brazil
- St. Anthony Cathedral

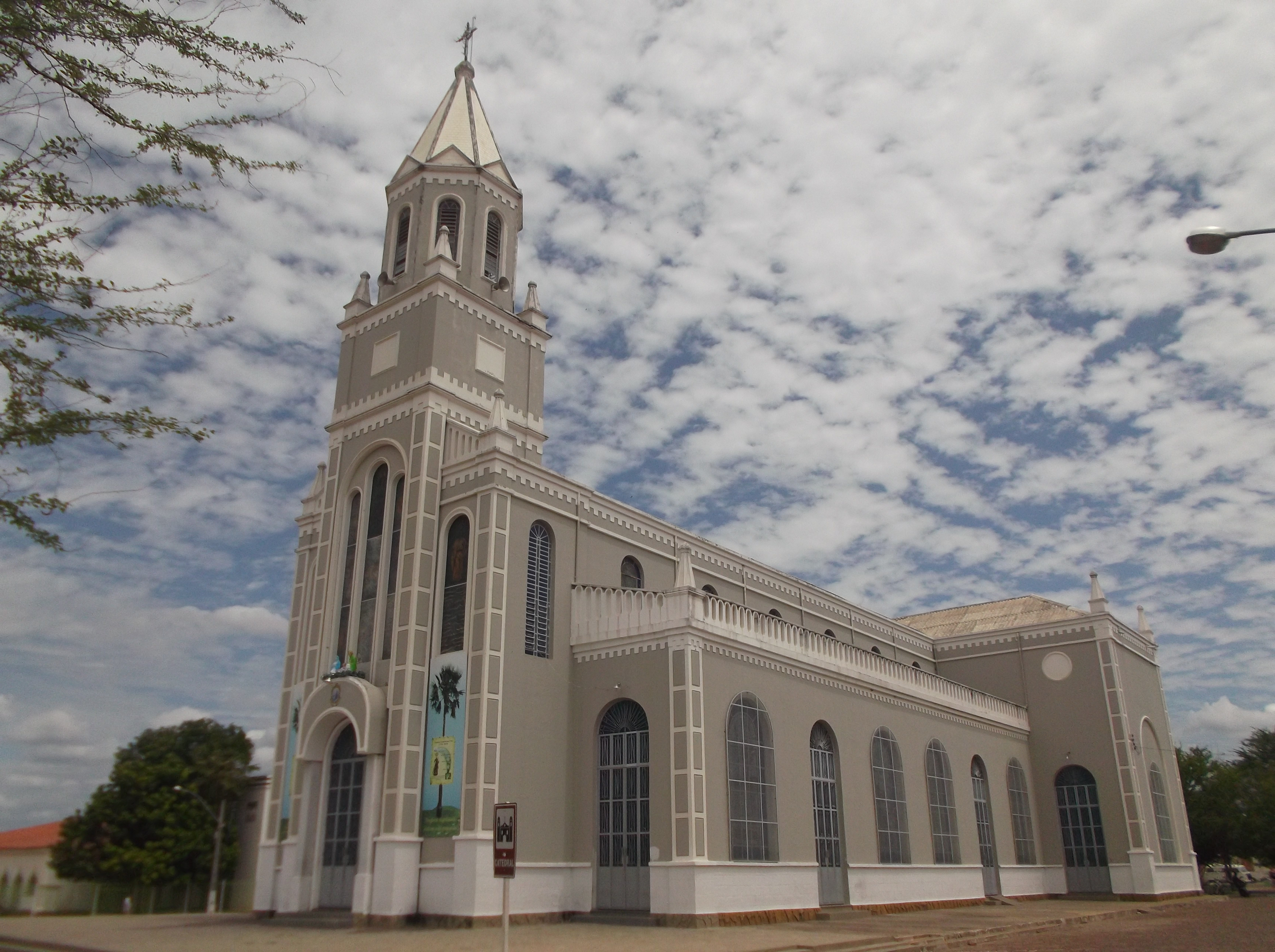
Another View
