= Siviero =

Siviero is an Italian surname. It is most common in North Italy and is likely a corrupted patronymic surname of Silverius. Notable people with this surname include:

- Álvaro Siviero (born 1969), Brazilian pianist
- Carlo Siviero (1882–1953), Italian painter
- Enzo Siviero (born 1945), Italian architect, engineer and writer
- Francesco Siviero (born 1964), Italian footballer
- Gianni Siviero (born 1938), Italian singer-songwriter
- Gustavo Siviero (born 1969), Argentine former professional footballer
- Jorge Luis Siviero (born 1952), former Uruguayan footballer and coach
- Massimo Siviero, Italian writer
- Rodolfo Siviero (1911–1983), Italian secret agent, art historian and intellectual
- Tiziano Siviero (born 1957), Italian rally co-driver

== See also ==
- Sivieri
