= Diocese of Floriano =

Catholic ecclesiastical territory

Coordinates: 6.7676°S 43.0219°W

Diocese of Floriano Dioecesis Florianensis Diocese de Floriano

Catholic

Location
- Country: Brazil
- Metropolitan: Archdiocese of Teresina
- Headquarters: Floriano, Piauí, Brazil

Statistics
- Area: 48,559 km^{2} (18,749 sq mi)
- Population: Total; Catholics: (as of 2023); 204,680; 163,300 (79.8%)
- Parishes: 29

Information
- Denomination: Catholic Church
- Sui iuris church: Latin Church
- Rite: Roman Rite
- Established: 27 February 2008; 18 years ago
- Cathedral: Catedral São Pedro de Alcântaria
- Patron saint: Peter of Alcántara
- Secular priests: 32 (23 Diocesan, 9 Religious Orders)

Current leadership
- Pope: Leo XIV
- Bishop: Júlio César Souza de Jesus
- Metropolitan Archbishop: Juarez Sousa da Silva

The Roman Catholic Diocese of Floriano (Latin: Dioecesis Florianensis) is a suffragan Latin diocese in the ecclesiastical province of Teresina, in northeastern Brazil.

Its cathedral episcopal see is Cathedral São Pedro de Alcântara, dedicated to Peter of Alcantara, in the city of Floriano, Piauí state.

== Statistics ==
As of 2023, it pastorally served 163,300 Catholics (79.8% of 204,680 total) on 48,559 km^{2} in 29 parishes and 3 missions with 32 priests (23 diocesan, 9 religious) and 31 lay religious (9 brothers, 22 sisters).

== History ==
- 27 February 2008: Established as Diocese of Floriano, on territory split off from the Diocese of Oeiras–Floriano (with its incumbent transferred as first bishop)

== Leadership ==
(all Roman rite)

Suffragan Bishops of Floriano

- Augusto Alves da Rocha (27 February 2008 – 17 March 2010), retired
- Valdemir Ferreira dos Santos (17 March 2010 – 4 May 2016), appointed Bishop of Amargosa, Bahia
- Edivalter Andrade (29 March 2017 – 8 November 2023), appointed Bishop of Parnaíba, Piauí
- Júlio César Souza de Jesus (7 June 2024 – Present)

== See also ==
- List of Catholic dioceses in Brazil

== Sources and external links ==
- GCatholic.org, with Google map & satellite photo - data for all sections
- Catholic Hierarchy
