= Diocese of Oeiras =

Catholic ecclesiastical territory

Diocese of Oeiras Dioecesis Oeirensis Diocese de Oeiras

Catholic
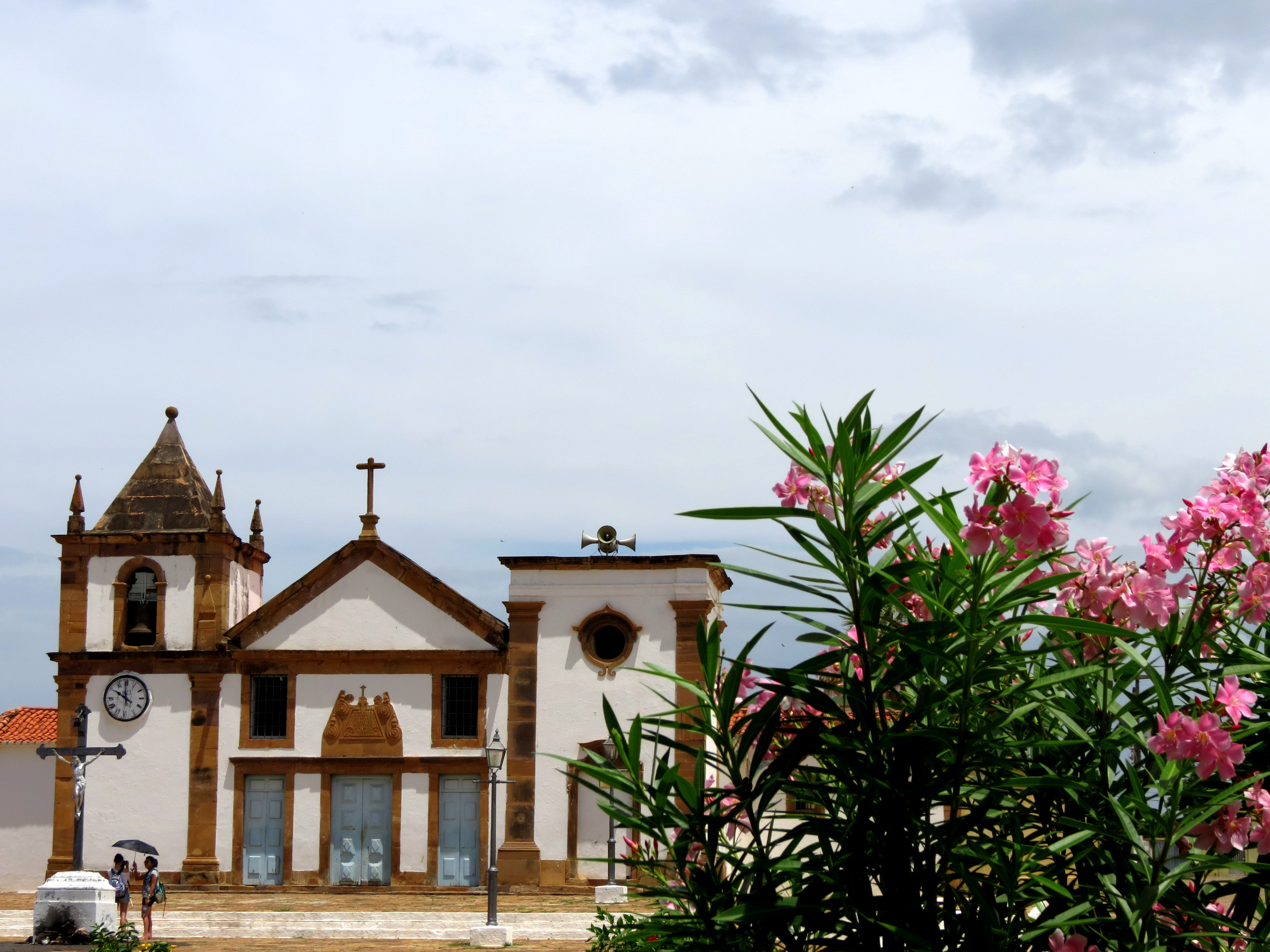
- Catedral Nossa Senhora da Vitória in 2014

Location
- Country: Brazil
- Metropolitan: Archdiocese of Teresina
- Headquarters: Oeiras, Piauí, Brazil

Statistics
- Area: 15,096 km^{2} (5,829 sq mi)
- Population: Total; Catholics: (as of 2023); 141,000; 126,000 (89.4%)
- Parishes: 17

Information
- Denomination: Catholic Church
- Sui iuris church: Latin Church
- Rite: Roman Rite
- Established: 16 December 1944; 81 years ago
- Cathedral: Catedral de Nossa Senhora da Vitória, Oeiras
- Patron saint: Our Lady of Victory
- Secular priests: 25 (24 Diocesan, 1 Religious Orders)

Current leadership
- Pope: Leo XIV
- Bishop: Sede vacante
- Metropolitan Archbishop: Juarez Sousa da Silva

The Roman Catholic Diocese of Oeiras (Latin: Dioecesis Oeirensis) is a Latin suffragan diocese in the ecclesiastical province of Teresina in northeastern Brazil.

Its cathedral episcopal see is Catedral Nossa Senhora da Vitória, dedicated to Our Lady of Victory, in the city of Oeiras in the Brazilian state of Piauí.

== Statistics ==
As of 2023, it pastorally served 126,000 Catholics (89.4% of 141,000 total) on 15,096 km² in 17 parishes with 25 priests (24 diocesan, 1 religious) and 8 lay religious (1 brother, 7 sisters).

== History ==
- Established on 16 December 1944 as Diocese of Oeiras, on territory split off from the Diocese of Piaui
- Lost territory on 28 October 1974 to establish the Diocese of Picos
- Renamed on 8 December 1977 as Diocese of Oeiras–Floriano
- Renamed back on 27 February 2008 as Diocese of Oeiras, having gained territory from its Metropolitan Archdiocese of Teresina and from Diocese of São Raimundo Nonato, but having lost territory to establish the Diocese of Floriano, to which see the incumbent transferred

== Bishops ==
(all Roman Rite)

=== Episcopal ordinaries ===
Suffragan Bishops of Oeiras (first time)

- Francisco Expedito Lopes (30 August 1948 – 24 August 1954), appointed Bishop of Garanhuns, Pernambuco
- Raimundo de Castro e Silva (17 November 1954 – 9 November 1957), resigned
- Edilbert Dinkelborg, O.F.M. (20 June 1959 – 8 December 1977 see below)

Suffragan Bishops of Oeiras – Floriano

- Edilbert Dinkelborg, O.F.M. (see above 8 December 1977 – 31 December 1991)
- Fernando Panico, M.S.C. (2 June 1993 – 2 May 2001), appointed Bishop of Crato, Ceará
- Augusto Alves da Rocha (24 October 2001 – 27 February 2008), appointed Bishop of Floriano, Piauí

Suffragan Bishops of Oeiras (second time)

- Juarez Sousa da Silva (27 February 2008 – 6 January 2016), appointed Coadjutor Bishop of Parnaíba, Piauí
- Edilson Soares Nobre (11 January 2017 – 13 May 2026), appointed Bishop of Guarabira, Paraíba

=== Other priests of this diocese who became bishop ===
- Paulo Hipólito de Souza Libório (1939-1949), appointed Bishop of Caruaru, Pernambuco in 1949
- Pedro Brito Guimarães (1986-2002), appointed Bishop of São Raimundo Nonato, Piauí in 2002

== See also ==
- List of Catholic dioceses in Brazil

== Sources and external links ==
- GCatholic.org, with Google map & - satellite photo - data for all sections
- Catholic Hierarchy
