= Mário Rino Sivieri =

Italian priest (1942–2020)

- Bishop of Propriá
- Church: Catholic Church
- Diocese: Diocese of Propriá
- In office: 18 March 1997 – 25 October 2017
- Predecessor: José Palmeira Lessa
- Successor: Vítor Agnaldo de Menezes

Orders
- Ordination: 3 July 1966 by Pope Paul VI
- Consecration: 25 May 1997 by Hildebrando Mendes Costa

Personal details
- Born: 15 April 1942 Castelmassa, Province of Rovigo, Kingdom of Italy
- Died: 3 June 2020 (aged 78) Aracaju, Sergipe, Brazil

Mário Rino Sivieri (15 April 1942 – 3 June 2020) was an Italian-born Brazilian Roman Catholic bishop.

Sivieri was born in Italy and was ordained to the priesthood in 1966. He served as bishop of the Roman Catholic Diocese of Propriá, Brazil, from 1997 to 2017.

Sivieri died of diabetes in Aracaju on 3 June 2020, aged 78.
