= Diocese of Campo Maior =

Catholic ecclesiastical territory

Coordinates: 4.8238°S 42.1684°W

Diocese of Campo Maior Dioecesis Campi Maioris

Catholic
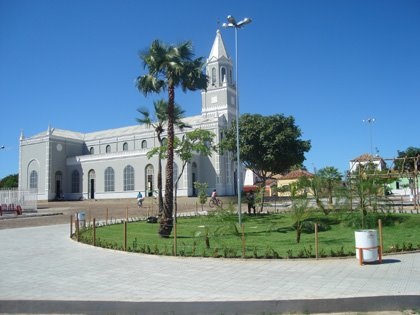
- Cathedral of St. Anthony

Location
- Country: Brazil
- Ecclesiastical province: Teresina

Statistics
- Area: 27,943 km^{2} (10,789 sq mi)
- Population: Total; Catholics: (as of 2006); 329,856; 304,234 (92.2%)

Information
- Rite: Latin Rite
- Established: 12 June 1975 (51 years ago)
- Cathedral: Catedral Santo Antônio

Current leadership
- Pope: Leo XIV
- Bishop: Benedito Araújo
- Metropolitan Archbishop: Jacinto Furtado de Brito Sobrinho

The Roman Catholic Diocese of Campo Maior (Latin: Dioecesis Campi Maioris) is a Latin suffragan diocese in the ecclesiastical province of Teresina, in northeastern Brazil's Piauí state.

Its cathedral episcopal see is Catedral Santo Antônio, dedicated to Saint Anthony, in the city of Campo Maior, Piauí.

== History ==
- Established 12 June 1975 as Diocese of Campo Maior on territories split off from the Diocese of Parnaíba and its Metropolitan Archdiocese of Teresina

== Statistics ==
As per 2014, it pastorally served 354,000 Catholics (94.9% of 373,000 total) on 27,943 km^{2} in 31 parishes and 419 missions with 35 priests (34 diocesan, 1 religious), 1 deacon, 23 lay religious (1 brother, 22 sisters) and 10 seminarians.

== Bishops ==
(all Roman rite)

=== Episcopal ordinaries ===
Suffragan Bishops of Campo Maior

- Abel Alonso Núñez, Mercederians (O. de M.) (1976.03.24 – retired 2000.02.02), previously Auxiliary Bishop of the then Territorial Prelature of Bom Jesus do Piauí (Brazil) (1971.07.14 – 1976.03.24) & Titular Bishop of Nicives (1971.07.14 – 1976.03.24)
- Eduardo Zielski (2000.02.02 – 2016.03.02), next Bishop of São Raimundo Nonato, Piaui (2016.03.02 - present)
- Francisco de Assis Gabriel dos Santos, Redemptorists (C.SS.R.) (2017.06.21 – 2025.04.09), appointed Bishop of Cajazeiras
- Benedito Araújo (2025.11.07 – present)

So far, the diocese has had no auxiliary bishop.

=== Other priest of this diocese who became bishop ===
- Juarez Sousa Da Silva, appointed Bishop of Oeiras, Piaui in 2008

== See also ==
- List of Catholic dioceses in Brazil

== Sources and external links ==
- GCatholic.org, with Google map - data for all sections
- Catholic Hierarchy
