= Edvaldo Gonçalves Amaral =

Brazilian Roman Catholic bishop (born 1927)

The Most Reverend Edvaldo Gonçalves Amaral
- Archbishop Emeritus of Maceió
- Church: Roman Catholic Church
- Archdiocese: Maceió
- Appointed: 24 October 1985
- Term ended: 3 July 2002

Orders
- Ordination: 8 December 1954
- Consecration: 20 April 1975 by Luciano José Cabral Duarte

Personal details
- Born: Edvaldo Gonçalves Amaral; 25 May 1927 (age 99) Recife, Brazil
- Motto: IN FIDE ET VERITATE

Edvaldo Gonçalves Amaral S.D.B. (born 25 May 1927) is a Brazilian Roman Catholic prelate who served as the archbishop of the Archdiocese of Maceió from 1985 until his retirement in 2002. He previously served as an auxiliary bishop and as Bishop of Parnaíba.

== Early life and priesthood ==
Edvaldo Gonçalves Amaral was born on 25 May 1927 in Recife, Brazil. He professed religious vows in the Salesians of Don Bosco and was ordained a priest on 8 December 1954. His early priestly ministry took place within the Salesian community and included pastoral and evangelization work typical of members of his congregation.

== Episcopal ministry ==
On 15 February 1975, Amaral was appointed an auxiliary bishop of the Roman Catholic Archdiocese of Aracaju and titular bishop of Zallata. He received his episcopal consecration on 20 April 1975 in Natal, with Luciano José Cabral Duarte as principal consecrator. He served as auxiliary bishop until 2 September 1980, when he was named Bishop of Parnaíba.

Amaral was appointed Archbishop of Maceió on 24 October 1985 and was installed later that year. He led the archdiocese until his resignation was accepted on 3 July 2002, after which he assumed the title Archbishop Emeritus. During his tenure he was known for his pastoral leadership and involvement in local Catholic initiatives in the city of Maceió and the surrounding region.

== Later life and recognition ==
In April 2025, shortly before his death, Pope Francis sent a letter to Amaral in recognition of the 50th anniversary of his episcopal ordination. The letter, written in Latin and conveyed through the Apostolic Nuncio, acknowledged his decades of service to the Church, evangelization efforts, and dedication to priestly formation.
