= Hildebrando Mendes Costa =

Brazilian Catholic bishop (born 1926)

His Excellency Hildebrando Mendes Costa
- Bishop Emeritus of Roman Catholic Diocese of Estância
- Appointed: 25 March 1986
- Term ended: 30 April 2003
- Predecessor: José Bezerra Coutinho
- Successor: Marco Eugênio Galrão Leite de Almeida
- Previous posts: Titular Bishop of Arindela (1981–1986), Auxuliary Bishop of Aracaju (1981–1986)

Orders
- Ordination: 2 December 1951
- Consecration: 24 May 1981 by Constantino José Lüers

Personal details
- Born: 16 June 1926 (age 99) Barra do Itiúba, Alagoas, Brazil
- Motto: Orationi et ministerio

Hildebrando Mendes Costa (born 16 June 1926) is a Brazilian Roman Catholic prelate, who served as a Titular Bishop of Arindela and an Auxuliary Bishop of Aracaju (1981—1986), and later, as a Diocesan Bishop of Estância (1986–2003).

== Biography ==
Hildebrando Mendes Costa was born in Barra do Itiúba, Alagoas in Brazil and was ordained priest in Penedo on 2 December 1951 for the Diocese of Penedo, but in 1973 he was transferred to serve in Arapiraca at the Archdiocese of Aracaju.

On 15 March 1981 Pope John Paul II appointed him an auxiliary bishop of the Archdiocese of Aracaju and at the same time titular bishop of Arindela and Mendes Costa received the episcopal consecration on 24 May of the same year from bishop of Penedo, Constantino José Lüers as a principal consecrator, and a co-consecrators Luciano José Cabral Duarte, archbishop of Aracaju and Miguel Fenelon Câmara Filho, archbishop of Maceió at the Estádio Municipal Coaracy da Mata Fonseca in Arapiraca.

On 25 March 1986, he was appointed as a diocesan bishop to the see of Estância and on 30 April 2003 he retired from the pastoral governance of the diocese because of the age limit.
