= Diocese of Propriá =

Catholic ecclesiastical territory

Diocese of Propriá Dioecesis Propriensis Diocese de Propriá

Catholic
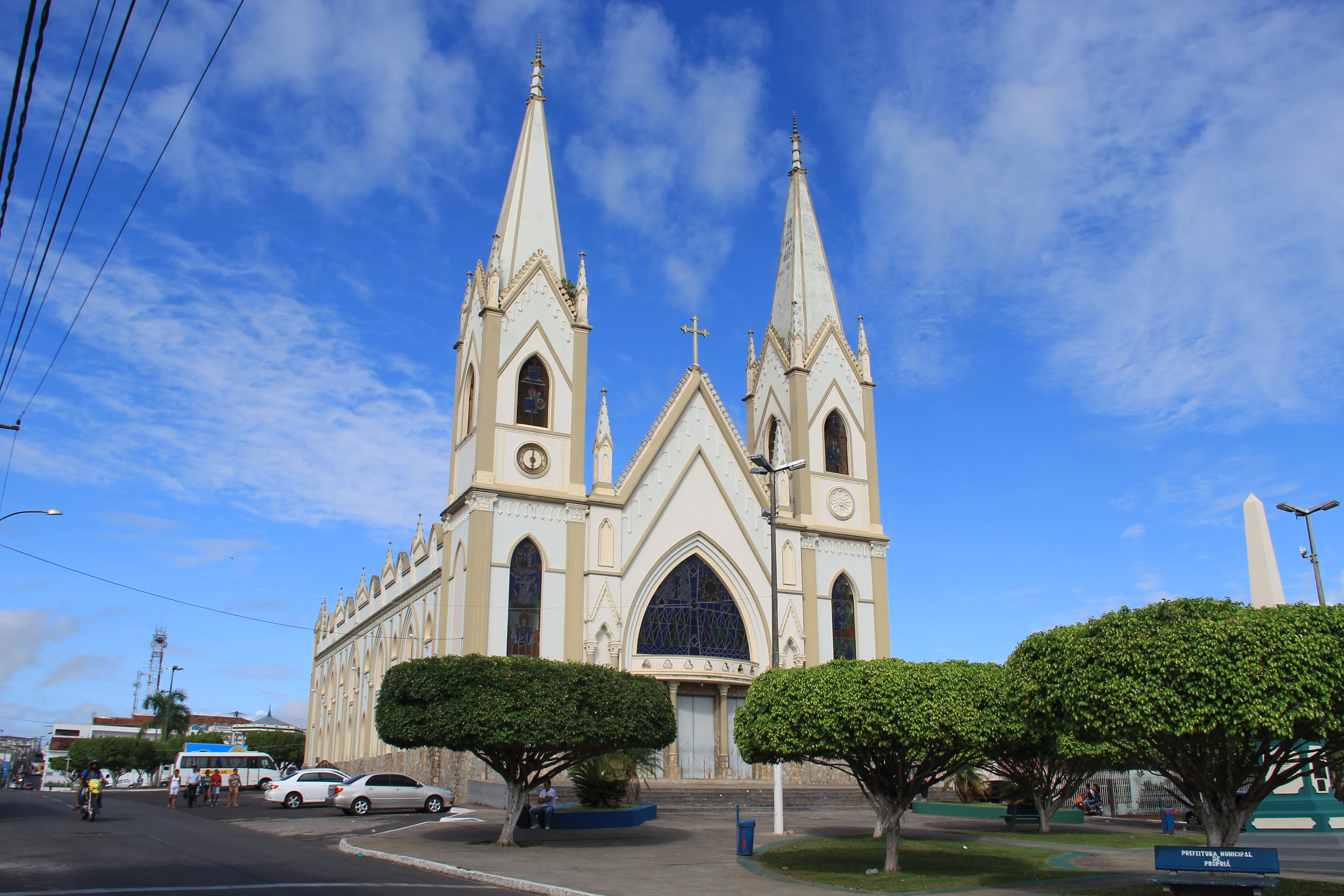

Location
- Country: Brazil
- Ecclesiastical province: Aracajú
- Metropolitan: Aracajú

Statistics
- Area: 8,198 km^{2} (3,165 sq mi)
- Population: Total; Catholics: (as of 2023); 365,000; 315,000 (86.3%)

Information
- Rite: Latin Rite
- Established: 30 April 1960 (66 years ago)
- Cathedral: Cathedral of St Anthony in Propriá

Current leadership
- Pope: Leo XIV
- Bishop: George Luís Amaral Muniz
- Metropolitan Archbishop: Josafá Menezes da Silva

Website
- www.diocesedepropria.com.br

The Roman Catholic Diocese of Propriá (Latin: Dioecesis Propriensis) is a Latin Rite suffragan diocese in the ecclesiastical province of the Metropolitan Archbishopric of Aracaju in Sergipe state, northeastern Brazil.

Its cathedral episcopal see is Catedral Santo Antônio, dedicated to Saint Anthony of Padua, in the city of Propriá, also in Sergipe.

== History ==
- Established on April 30, 1960 as Diocese of Propriá, on territory split off from its simultaneously promoted mother see, the (newly Arch)Diocese of Aracaju.

== Statistics ==
As per 2014, it pastorally served 334,500 Catholics (97.4% of 343,600 total) on 8,181 km² in 25 parishes with 30 priests (29 diocesan, 1 religious), 40 lay religious (1 brother, 39 sisters) and 9 seminarians.

== Bishops ==
(all Roman rite)

=== Episcopal ordinaries ===
Suffragan Bishops of Propriá

- José Brandão de Castro, Redemptorists (C.SS.R.) (1960.06.25 – retired 1987.10.30), died 1999
- José Palmeira Lessa (1987.10.30 – 1996.12.06), went on to be the Metropolitan Archbishop of above Aracaju (1998.08.26 – retired 2017.01.18)
- Mário Rino Sivieri (1997.03.18 – 2017.10.25)
- Vítor Agnaldo de Menezes (2017.10.25 – 2025.02.14), appointed Archbishop of Vitória da Conquista, Bahia
- George Luís Amaral Muniz (2025.10.25 – present)

=== Other priest of this diocese who became bishop ===
- Antônio dos Santos Cabral, appointed Bishop of Natal in 1917

== See also ==
- List of Catholic dioceses in Brazil

== Sources end external links ==
- GCatholic.org, with Google map & satellite photo - data for all sections
- Catholic Hierarchy
