= Sivieri =

Sivieri is an Italian surname. Notable people with the surname include:

- Adriana Sivieri (1918–1970), Argentine-born Italian film actress
- Mário Rino Sivieri (1942–2020), Italian-born Brazilian Roman Catholic bishop
