= Diocese of Bom Jesus do Gurguéia =

Catholic ecclesiastical territory in Brazil

Coordinates: 9.0721°S 44.3563°W

Diocese of Bom Jesus do Gurguéia Dioecesis Boni Iesu a Gurgueia

Catholic
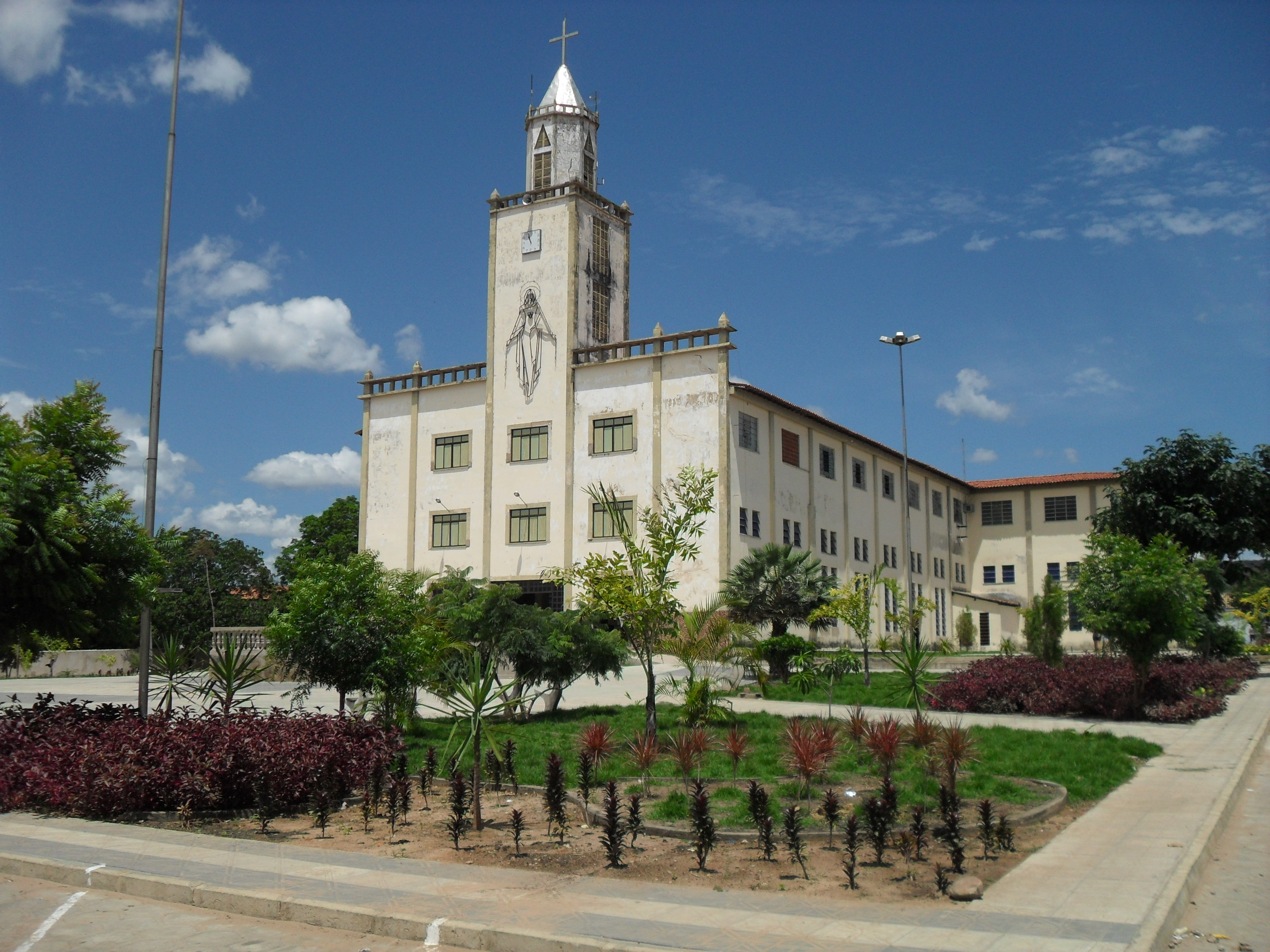
- Catedral de Nossa Senhora das Mercês in 2012

Location
- Country: Brazil
- Ecclesiastical province: Teresina

Statistics
- Area: 53,583 km^{2} (20,689 sq mi)
- Population: Total; Catholics: (as of 2004); 161,532; 143,832 (89.0%)

Information
- Sui iuris church: Latin Church
- Rite: Roman Rite
- Established: 18 June 1920 (106 years ago)
- Cathedral: Catedral de Nossa Senhora das Mercês

Current leadership
- Pope: Leo XIV
- Bishop: Marcos Antônio Tavoni
- Metropolitan Archbishop: Jacinto Furtado de Brito Sobrinho

The Roman Catholic Diocese of Bom Jesus do Gurguéia (Latin: Dioecesis Boni Iesu a Gurgueia) is a Latin suffragan diocese in the ecclesiastical province of the Metropolitan Archbishop of Teresina, in northeastern Brazil's Piauí state.

Its cathedral episcopal see is the Marian Catedral de Nossa Senhora das Mercês, located in the city of Bom Jesus, Piauí.

== History ==
- Established on 18 June 1920 as Territorial Prelature of Bom Jesus do Piauí, on territory split off from the Diocese of Piaui
- Lost territory on 17 December 1960 to establish the then Territorial Prelature of São Raimundo Nonato (later promoted to diocese)
- Promoted on 3 October 1981 as Diocese of Bom Jesus do Gurguéia

== Bishops ==
(all Roman Rite)

=== Ordinaries ===
Territorial (bishop-)prelates of Bom Jesus do Piauí

- Pedro Pascual Miguel y Martínez, Order of the Blessed Virgin Mary of Mercy (Mercederians, O. de M.) (18 December 1924 – death 5 May 1926), titular bishop of Agathopolis (18 December 1924 – 5 May 1926)
- Ramón Harrison Abello, O. de M. (14 November 1926 – retired 1928), titular bishop of Podalia (14 November 1926 – death 9 August 1949)
- Inocéncio Lopez Santamaria, O. de M. (1 August 1930 – death 9 March 1958), titular bishop of Trebenna (1 August 1930 – 9 March 1958)
- José Vázquez Díaz, O. de M. (8 March 1958 – 3 October 1981 see below), succeeded as former coadjutor bishop-prelate of Bom Jesus do Piauí (8 July 1956 – 8 March 1958) and titular bishop of Usula (8 July 1956 – 26 May 1978)
  - Auxiliary bishop Abel Alonso Núñez, O. de M. (14 July 1971 – 24 March 1976), titular bishop of Nicives (14 July 1971 – 24 March 1976); later Bishop of Campo Maior (Brazil) (24 March 1976 – retired 2 February 2000)

Suffragan bishops of Bom Jesus do Gurguéia

- José Vázquez Díaz, O. de M. (see above 3 October 1981 – retired 1 March 1989)
- Ramón López Carrozas, O. de M. (1 March 1989 – retired 15 January 2014), succeeded as former auxiliary bishop of Bom Jesus do Gurguéia (26 April 1979 – 1 March 1989) and titular bishop of Ceramus (26 April 1979 – 1 March 1989)
- Marcos Antônio Tavoni (15 January 2014 – )

=== Coadjutor prelate ===
- José Vázquez Díaz, O. de M. (1956-1958)

=== Auxiliary bishops ===
- Abel Alonso Núñez, O. de M. † (1971-1976), appointed Bishop of Campo Maior, Piauí
- Ramón López Carrozas, O. de M. (1979-1989), appointed bishop here

== Sources and external links ==
- GCatholic.org, with incumbent bio links
- Catholic Hierarchy
