= Estância, Sergipe =

Municipality in Sergipe, Brazil

Estância Município de Estância
- Municipality
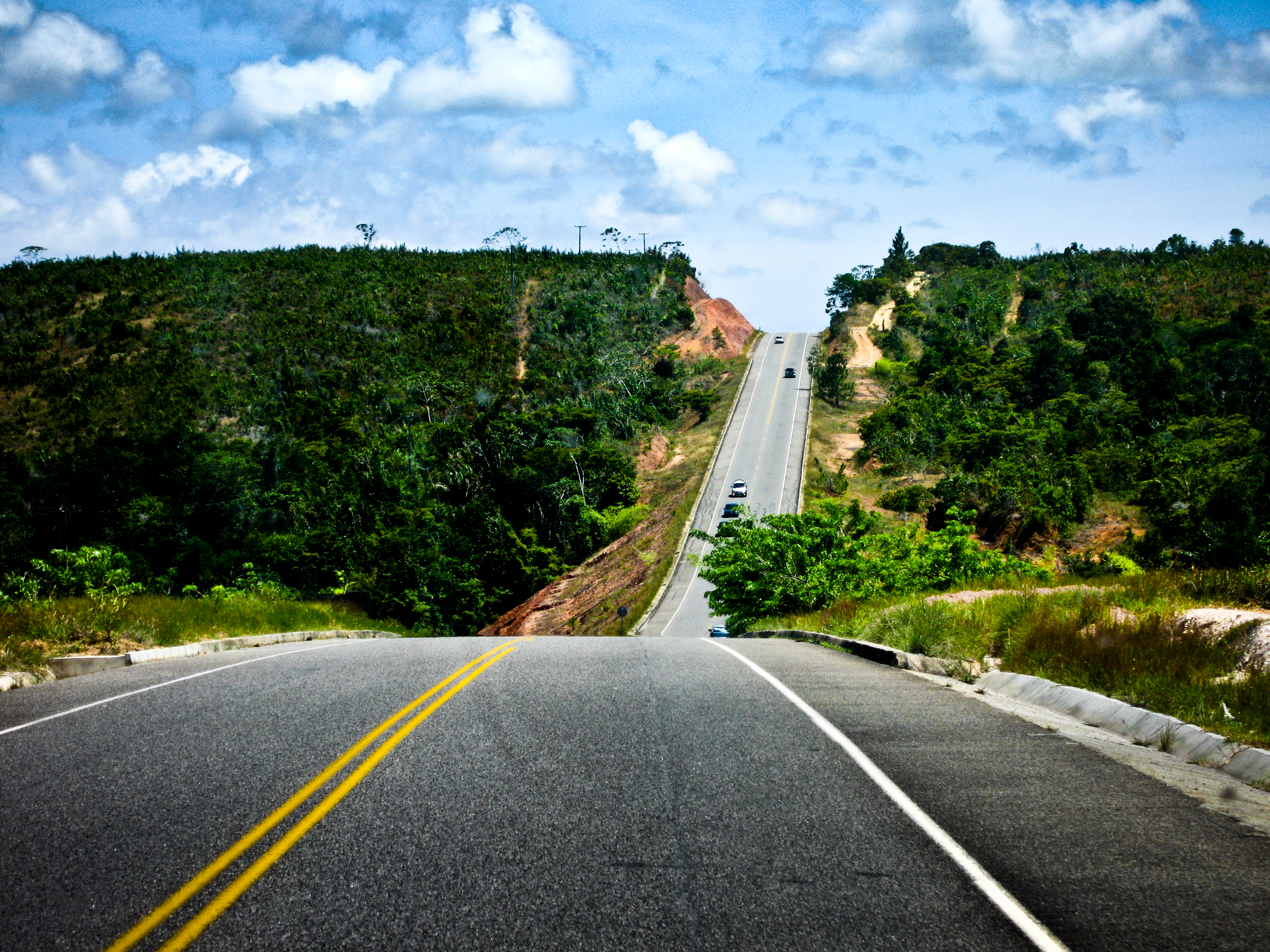
- BA-099 through rural Estância

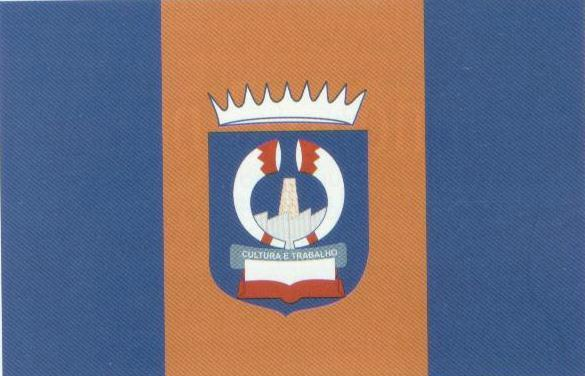
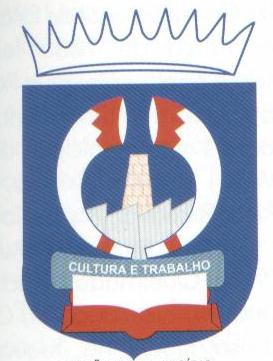
- Flag Coat of arms

- Location of Estância in Sergipe

- Location of Estância in Brazil
- Coordinates: 11°16′04″S 37°26′16″W
- Country: Brazil
- Region: Northeast
- State: Sergipe
- Founded: October 25, 1831

Government
  - Mayor: Gilson Andrade de Oliveira

Area
  - Total: 644.5 km^{2} (248.8 sq mi)
- Elevation: 53 m (174 ft)

Population (2020)
  - Total: 69,556
  - Density: 107.9/km^{2} (279.5/sq mi)
- Time zone: UTC−3 (BRT)
- Website: estancia.se.gov.br

Estância (Brazilian Portuguese: [isˈtɐ̃si.ɐ]) is a municipality located in the Brazilian state of Sergipe. Its population is 69,556 (2020). Estância covers 644.5 km^{2} (248.8 mi^{2}), and has a population density of 110 inhabitants per square kilometer. It is located 66 km (41 mi) from the state capital of Sergipe, Aracaju. The city is the seat of the Roman Catholic Diocese of Estância.

== History ==
João Mendes, head of the Captaincy of Sergipe, granted Pedro Homem da Costa and his brother-in-law the land of Estância on September 16, 1621. The area was home to a Mexican population which specialized in cattle raising; they were called estancieiros and ultimately the settlement was named for them. Pedro Homem da Costa built the first chapel in the area, the Church of Nossa Senhora de Guadalupe. It is dedicated to Our Lady of Guadalupe, who was not unknown in Brazil but strongly associated with Catholic Mexicans.

Estância was a district of Vila de Santa Luzia do Real, now known as Santa Luzia do Itanhy. Santa Luzia fell into decay by the mid-18th century and the King of Portugal granted Estância independent legal status, and the city seat of Santa Luzia was transferred to Estância on October 25, 1831. It was elevated to city status on May 4, 1848. The Emperor Dom Pedro II visited Estância and called it "the garden of Sergipe" for its landscape and numerous tiled houses.

== Heritage sites ==
Estância, reflecting its past economic prestige, is home to numerous historic structures from the 18th and 19th century. The House at Praça Rio Branco No. 35 was declared a federal historic site by National Institute of Historic and Artistic Heritage in 1962. Eight houses on Rua Capitão Salomão and one on Rua Duque de Caxias have been declared historic sites by the State of Sergipe, as well as the Church of Our Lady of the Rosary and a painting by Horácio Hora at the Hospital Amparo de Maria. Few historic sites in Estância are well-maintained and some, notably on Rua Capitão Salomão and Rua Pernambuquinho, have been demolished.

== See also ==
- List of municipalities in Sergipe
