= Cândido Lorenzo González =

Spanish Catholic bishop (1925–2019)

Cândido Lorenzo González O. de M.
- Bishop of São Raimundo Nonato
- Native name: Cándido Lorenzo González
- Church: Catholic Church
- Diocese: Diocese of São Raimundo Nonato
- In office: 5 December 1969 – 12 July 2002
- Predecessor: Amadeu González Ferreiros
- Successor: Pedro Brito Guimarães
- Previous post: Titular Bishop of Scardona (1969-1978)

Orders
- Ordination: 6 June 1954 by Fernando Quiroga Palacios
- Consecration: 19 March 1970 by Jaime de Barros Câmara

Personal details
- Born: 23 September 1925 Xinzo de Limia, Province of Ourense, Kingdom of Spain
- Died: 17 September 2019 (aged 93) São Raimundo Nonato, Piauí, Brazil

Cândido Lorenzo González (23 September 1925 – 17 December 2019) was a Spanish Catholic bishop who served in Brazil. He was a member of the Order of Our Lady of Mercy (Mercedarians).

Lorenzo González was born in Spain and was ordained to the priesthood in 1954. He served as bishop of the Roman Catholic Diocese of São Raimundo Nonato, Brazil from 1969 to 2002.
