= Our Lady of the Conception Cathedral, Aracaju =

Our Lady of the Conception Cathedral
- Catedral Metropolitana Nossa Senhora da Conceiçao
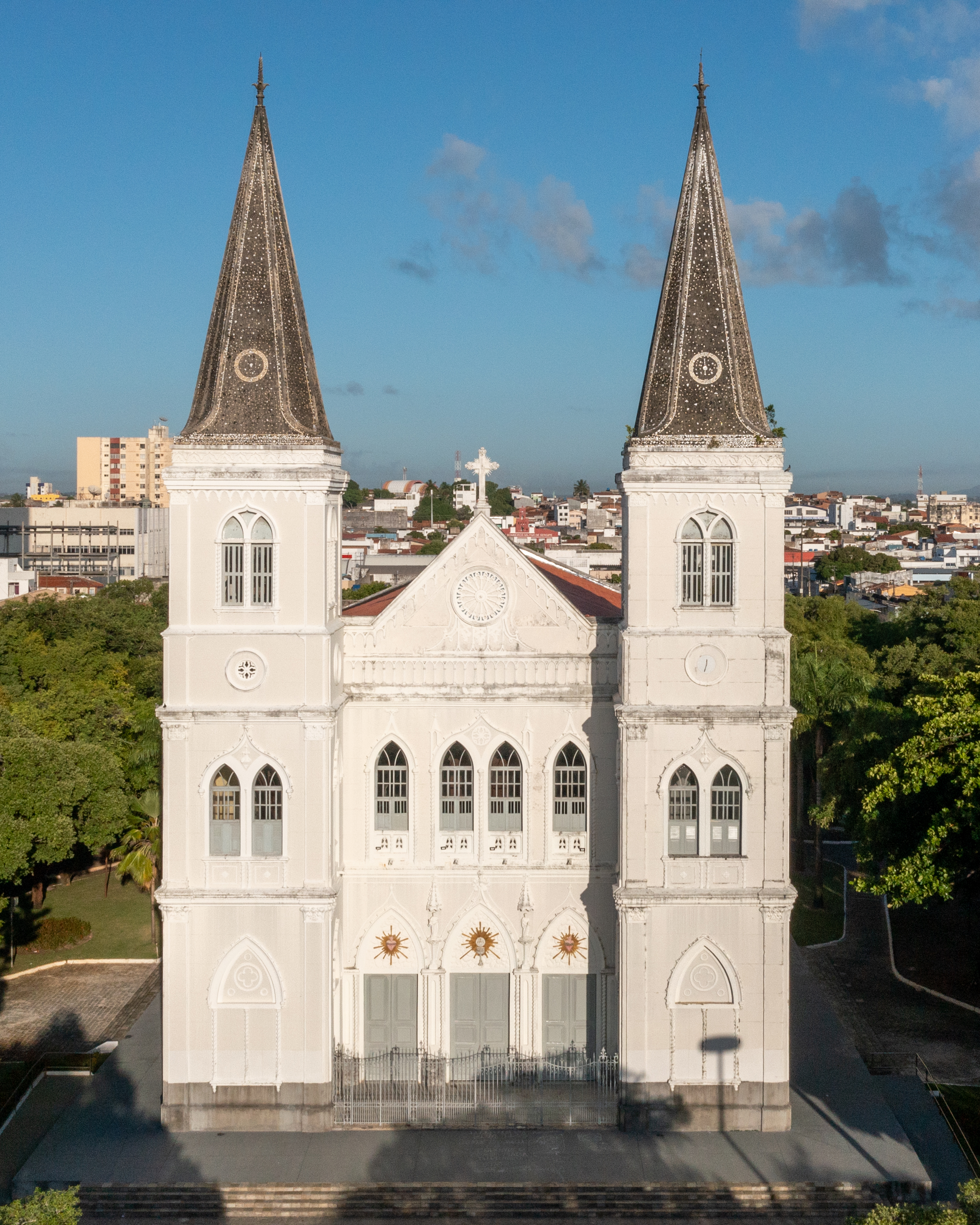

- Our Lady of the Conception Cathedral in Brazil
- 10.913254°S 37.051794°W
- Location: Aracaju
- Country: Brazil
- Denomination: Roman Catholic Church

Architecture
- Style: Neoclassical and Gothic Revival
- Groundbreaking: 1862
- Completed: 1875

Administration
- Archdiocese: Roman Catholic Archdiocese of Aracaju

The Our Lady of the Conception Cathedral (Portuguese: Catedral Metropolitana Nossa Senhora da Conceiçao), also known as the Metropolitan Cathedral of Aracaju and commonly as the Aracaju Cathedral, is a Roman Catholic church in Aracaju, Sergipe, Brazil. It is dedicated to Our Lady of Conception. Construction on the church began in 1862 under Father Eliziário Vieira Moniz Teles. It opened as the Our Lady of the Conception Church (Igreja de Nossa Senhora da Conceição) on December 22, 1875 under Father José Luiz Azevedo. It was listed as a historic structure by the Municipality of Aracaju.

== History ==
Our Lady of the Conception was elevated to the status of cathedral on January 3, 1910. Its architecture is linked to the striking elements of both the Neoclassical and Gothic Revival styles. The interior features artwork by Orestes Gatti and Rodolfo Tavares. The church follows the Roman or Latin rite and functions as the seat of the Roman Catholic Archdiocese of Aracaju, which was created in 1910 through the bull "Divina disposente clementia" of Pope Pius X.

== Protected status ==
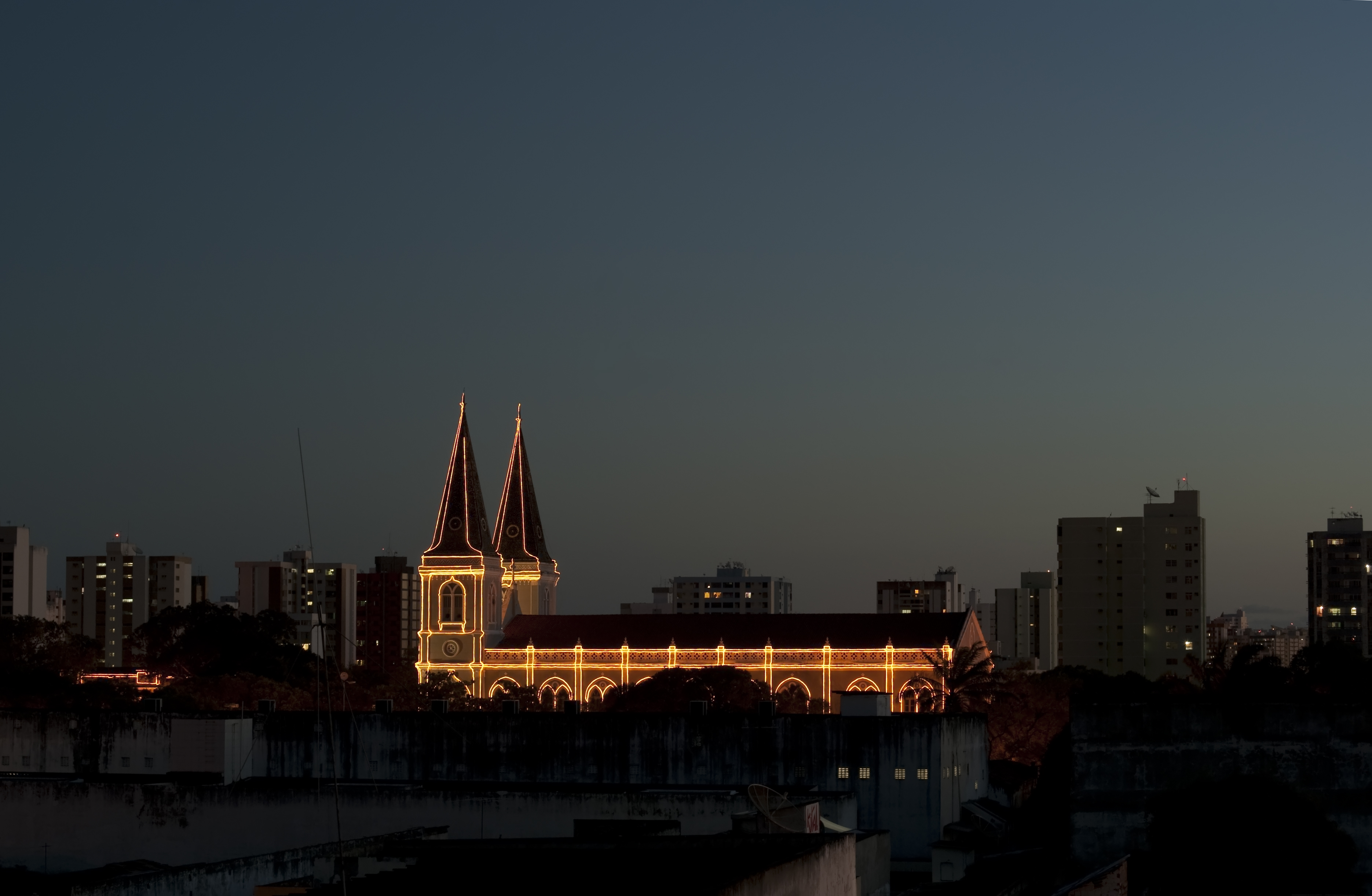
Evening view

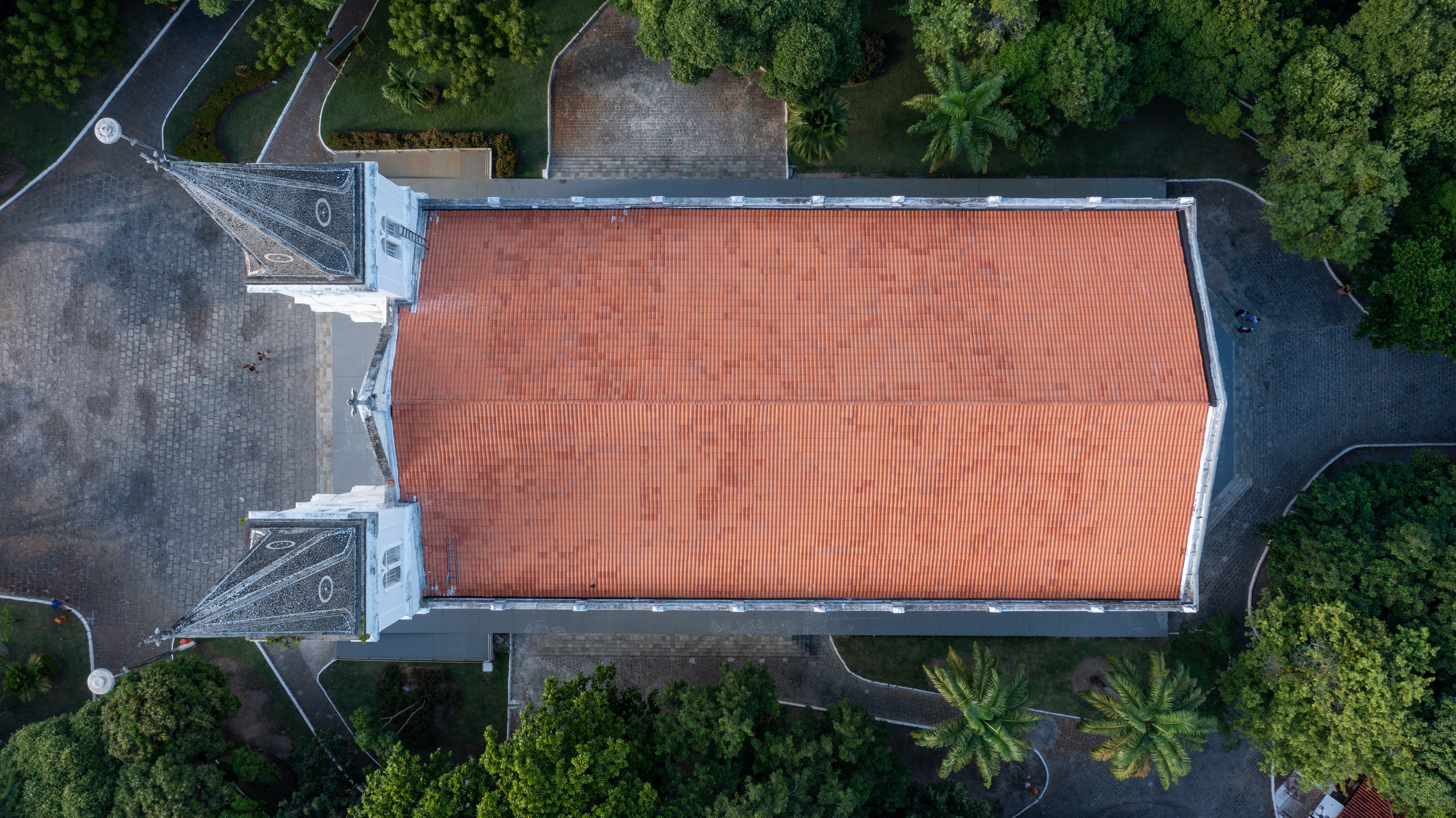
Aerial view of roof

The Our Lady of the Conception Cathedral was listed as a historic structure by the Municipality of Aracaju under decree number 6.819 of January 28, 1985.

== Access ==
The cathedral is open to the public and may be visited.

== See also ==
- Roman Catholicism in Brazil
