= Diocese of Estância =

Latin Catholic territory in Brazil

Coordinates: 11.2690°S 37.4380°W

Diocese of Estância Dioecesis Stantianus Diocese de Estância

Catholic

Location
- Country: Brazil
- Ecclesiastical province: Aracajú

Statistics
- Area: 6,736 km^{2} (2,601 sq mi)
- Population: Total; Catholics: (as of 2006); 431,127; 423,228 (98.2%)

Information
- Denomination: Catholic Church
- Sui iuris church: Latin Church
- Rite: Roman Rite
- Established: 30 April 1960 (66 years ago)
- Cathedral: Cathedral of our Lady of Guadalupe in Estância

Current leadership
- Pope: Leo XIV
- Bishop: José Genivaldo Garcia
- Metropolitan Archbishop: Josafá Menezes da Silva
- Bishops emeritus: Hildebrando Mendes Costa

Website
- Website of the Diocese

The Diocese of Estância (Latin: Dioecesis Stantianus) is a Latin Church ecclesiastical territory or diocese of the Catholic Church located in the city of Estância. It is a suffragan in the ecclesiastical province of metropolitan Archdiocese of Aracajú in Brazil.

== History ==
- April 30, 1960: Established as Diocese of Estância from the Diocese of Aracaju

== Bishops ==
=== Ordinaries ===
- Bishops of Estância (Roman rite), in reverse chronological order
  - Bishop José Genivaldo Garcia (2022.11.30 – present)
  - Bishop Giovanni Crippa, I.M.C. (2014.07.09 – 2021.08.11), appointed Bishop of Ilhéus, Bahia
  - Bishop Marco Eugênio Galrão Leite de Almeida (2003.04.30 – 2013.09.25), appointed Auxiliary Bishop of São Salvador da Bahia
  - Bishop Hildebrando Mendes Costa (1986.03.25 – 2003.04.30)
  - Bishop José Bezerra Coutinho (1961.01.28 – 1985.06.01)

=== Other priests of this diocese who became bishops ===
- Dulcênio Fontes de Matos, appointed Auxiliary Bishop of Aracajú, Sergipe in 2001
- Paulo Celso Dias do Nascimento (priest here, 1989-2012), appointed Auxiliary Bishop of São Sebastião do Rio de Janeiro in 2017

== Sources ==
- GCatholic.org
- Catholic Hierarchy
