= Ramón López Carrozas =

Brazilian-Spanish Roman Catholic bishop (1937–2018)

Ramón López Carrozas O. de M.
- Bishop of Bom Jesus do Gurguéia
- Church: Catholic Church
- Diocese: Diocese of Bom Jesus do Gurguéia
- In office: 1 March 1989 – 15 January 2014
- Predecessor: José Vázquez Díaz
- Successor: Marcos Antônio Tavoni
- Previous posts: Titular Bishop of Ceramus (1979-1989); Auxiliary Bishop of Bom Jesus do Gurguéia (1981-1989); Auxiliary Bishop of Bom Jesus do Piauí (1979-1981)

Orders
- Ordination: 10 April 1960 by Miguel Nóvoa Fuente
- Consecration: 27 May 1979 by Pope John Paul II

Personal details
- Born: 31 October 1937 Sarria, Province of Lugo, Nationalist zone (Spanish State)
- Died: 28 April 2018 (aged 80) Teresina, Piauí, Brazil

Ramón López Carrozas, O.de M. (31 August 1937 – 28 April 2018) was a Brazilian-Spanish Roman Catholic bishop.

Carrozas was born in Spain and was ordained to the priesthood in 1960. He served as titular bishop of Ceramus and auxiliary bishop of the Roman Catholic Diocese of Bom Jesus do Gurguéia, Brazil, from 1979 to 1989. Carrozas then served as bishop of the Diocese from 1989 to 2014.
