= Diocese of Picos =

Catholic ecclesiastical territory

Diocese of Picos Dioecesis Picuensis

Catholic
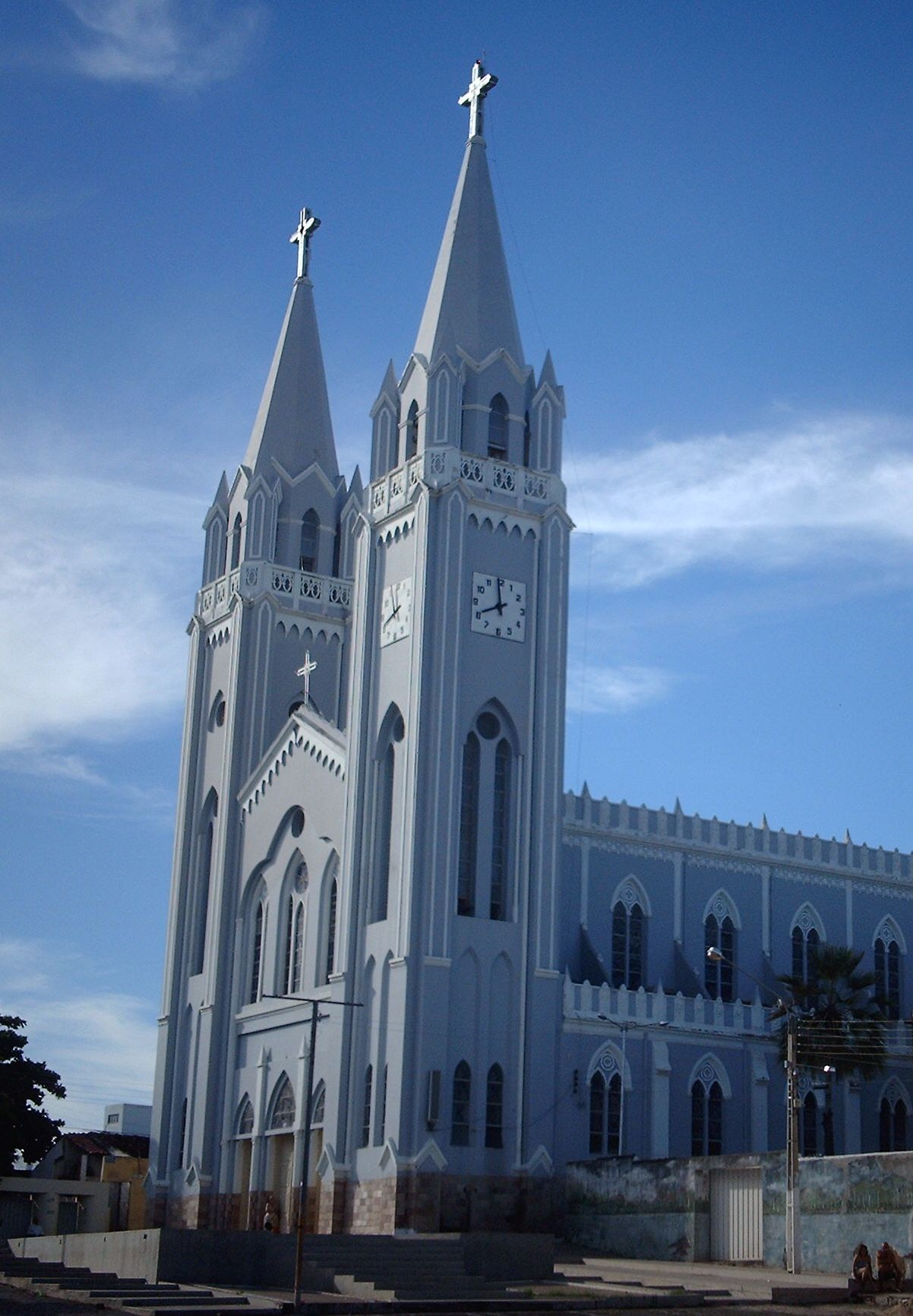
- Cathedral of Our Lady of Remedies

Location
- Country: Brazil
- Ecclesiastical province: Teresina

Statistics
- Area: 23,121 km^{2} (8,927 sq mi)
- Population: Total; Catholics: (as of 2004); 347,140; 302,862 (87.2%)

Information
- Rite: Latin Rite
- Established: 28 October 1974 (52 years ago)
- Cathedral: Catedral Nossa Senhora dos Remédios

Current leadership
- Pope: Leo XIV
- Bishop: Plínio José Luz da Silva
- Metropolitan Archbishop: Jacinto Furtado de Brito Sobrinho

Website
- www.diocesedepicos.org.br

The Roman Catholic Diocese of Picos (Latin: Dioecesis Picuensis) is a diocese located in the city of Picos in the ecclesiastical province of Teresina in Brazil.

== History ==
- 28 October 1974: Established as Diocese of Picos from the Diocese of Oeiras and Metropolitan Archdiocese of Teresina

== Bishops ==
- Bishops of Picos (Roman rite), in reverse chronological order
  - Bishop Plínio José Luz da Silva (2003.11.26 – present)
  - Bishop Augusto Alves da Rocha (1975.05.23 – 2001.10.24), appointed Bishop of Oeiras-Floriano, Piaui

=== Another priest of this diocese who became bishop ===
- Alfredo Schäffler, appointed Coadjutor Bishop of Parnaíba, Piaui in 2000
