= Archdiocese of Aracaju =

Catholic ecclesiastical territory

Coordinates: 10.9133°S 37.0517°W

Metropolitan Archdiocese of Aracaju Archidioecesis Metropolitae Aracaiuensis Arquidiocese Metropolitano de Aracaju

Catholic
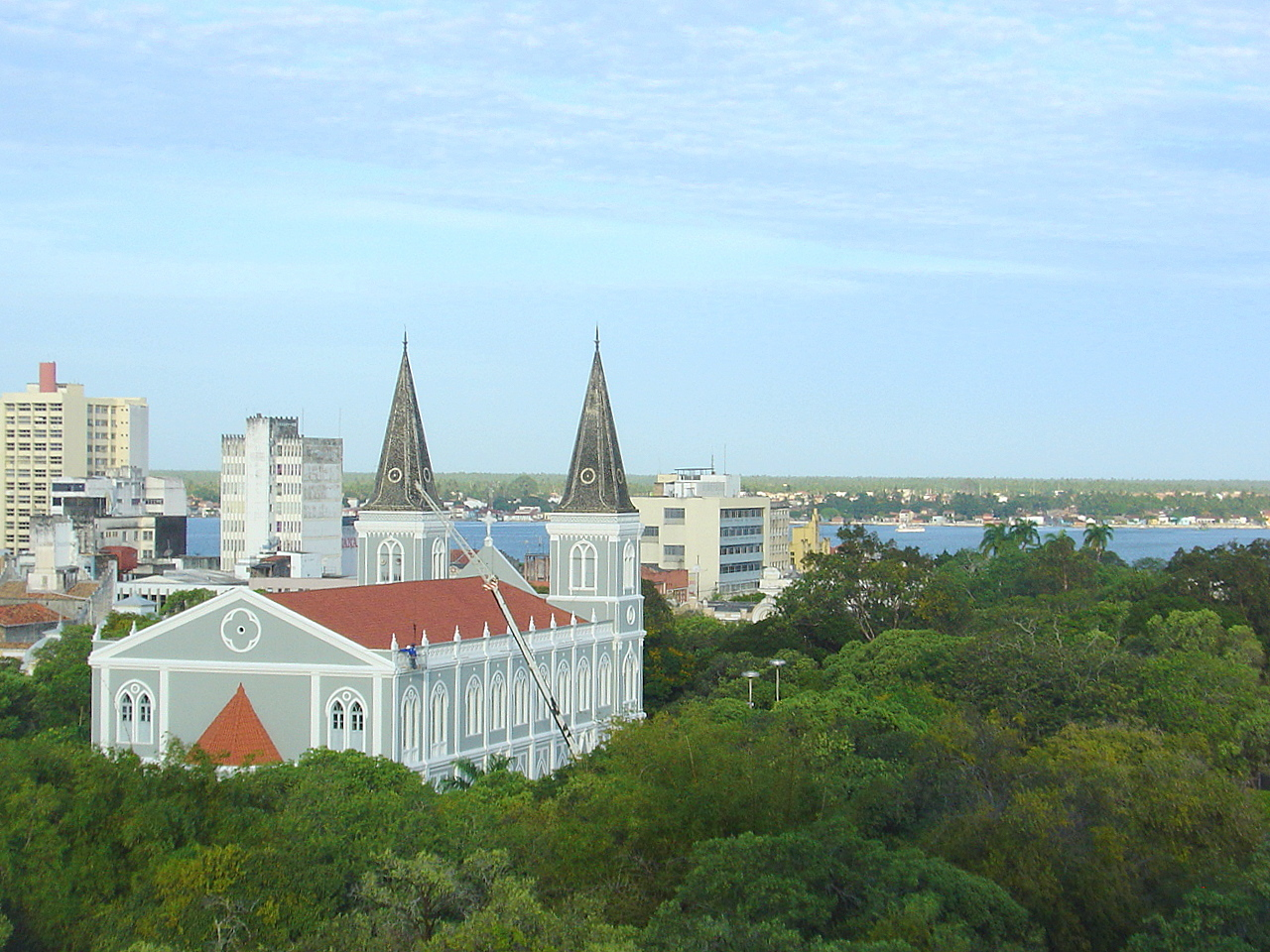
- Metropolitan Cathedral of Our Lady of the Conception

- Coat of arms

Location
- Country: Brazil
- Ecclesiastical province: Aracaju

Statistics
- Area: 7,019 km^{2} (2,710 sq mi)
- Population: Total; Catholics: (as of 2023); 1,435,108; 1,004,576 (70%)
- Parishes: 112

Information
- Denomination: Catholic
- Sui iuris church: Latin Church
- Rite: Roman Rite
- Established: 3 January 1910 (116 years ago)
- Cathedral: Cathedral of the Immaculate Conception in Aracaju

Current leadership
- Pope: Leo XIV
- Metropolitan Archbishop: Dom. Josafá Menezes da Silva
- Bishops emeritus: José Palmeira Lessa

Website
- www.arquidiocesedearacaju.org

The Roman Catholic Metropolitan Archdiocese of Aracaju (Latin: Archidioecesis Metropolitae Aracaiuensis) is a Latin Metropolitan archdiocese in the State of Sergipe, northeastern Brazil. Its cathedral archiepiscopal see is Our Lady of the Conception Cathedral (Catedral Metropolitana Nossa Senhora da Conceiçao), dedicated to Our Lady of Immaculate Conception, in the city of Aracaju. Two World Heritage Sites are owned by the Archdiocese in São Cristóvão, Sergipe: the Misericórdia Hospital and Church (Igreja de Santa Casa de Misericórdia) and the Church and Convent of Santa Cruz, also known as the Church and Convent of Saint Francis.

== Statistics ==
As per 2014, it pastorally served 1,086,000 Catholics (84.1% of 1,292,000 total) on 7,019 km^{2} in 99 parishes with 159 priests (129 diocesan, 30 religious), 21 deacons, 321 lay religious (119 brothers, 202 sisters) and 34 seminarians.

== History ==
It was established on January 3, 1910, as Diocese of Aracaju, on territory split off from the Metropolitan Archdiocese of São Salvador da Bahia. On April 30, 1960, it was promoted as Metropolitan Archdiocese of Aracaju, losing territory to establish its two suffragans: Diocese of Estância and Diocese of Propriá.

== Ecclesiastical province ==
Its suffragan dioceses are both daughter sees :

- Roman Catholic Diocese of Estância
- Roman Catholic Diocese of Propriá

== Episcopal ordinaries ==
=== Suffragan Bishops of Aracaju ===
- José Tomas Gomes da Silva (1911.05.12 – death 1948.10.31)
- Fernando Gomes dos Santos (1949.02.01 – 1957.03.07), previously Bishop of Penedo (Brazil) (1943.01.09 – 1949.02.01); later Metropolitan Archbishop of Goiânia (Brazil) (1957.03.07 – death 1985.06.01)
- José Vicente Távora (1957.11.20 – 1960.04.30 see below), previously Titular Bishop of Prusias ad Hypium (1954.06.23 – 1957.11.20) as Auxiliary Bishop of (São Sebastião do) Rio de Janeiro (Brazil) (1954.06.23 – 1957.11.20)

=== Metropolitan Archbishops of Aracaju ===
- José Vicente Távora (see above 1960.04.30 – death 1970.04.03)
- Luciano José Cabral Duarte (1971.02.12 – retired 1998.08.26), also First Vice-president of Latin American Episcopal Council (1979 – 1983); succeeded as former Titular Bishop of Gadiaufala (1966.07.14 – 1971.02.12) and Auxiliary Bishop of Aracaju (1966.07.14 – 1971.02.12)
- José Palmeira Lessa (1998.08.26 – 2017.01.18); previously Titular Bishop of Sita (1982.06.21 – 1987.10.30) as Auxiliary Bishop of (São Sebastião do) Rio de Janeiro (Brazil) (1982.06.21 – 1987.10.30), Bishop of Propriá (Brazil) (1987.10.30 – 1996.12.06), Coadjutor Archbishop of Aracaju (1996.12.06 – succession 1998.08.26)
- João José da Costa, Carmelite Order (O. Carm.) (2017.01.18 – 2024.03.13), previously Bishop of Iguatu (Brazil) (2009.01.07 – 2014.11.05), Coadjutor Archbishop of Aracaju (2014.11.05 – succession 2017.01.18).
- Josafá Menezes da Silva (2024.03.13 – present), previously Metropolitan Archbishop of Vitória da Conquista (Brazil) (2019 – 2024)

== Other affiliated bishops ==
=== Coadjutor archbishops ===
- José Palmeira Lessa (1996–1998)
- João José da Costa, O. Carm. (2016–2017)

=== Auxiliary bishops ===
- Nivaldo Monte (1963–1965), appointed Apostolic Administrator of Natal, Rio Grande do Norte
- Luciano José Cabral Duarte (1966–1971), appointed Archbishop here
- Edvaldo Gonçalves Amaral, S.D.B. (1975–1980), appointed Bishop of Parnaíba, Piaui
- Hildebrando Mendes Costa (1981–1986), appointed Bishop of Estância, Sergipe
- João Maria Messi, O.S.M. (1988–1995), appointed Bishop of Irecê, Bahia
- Dulcênio Fontes de Matos (2001–2006), appointed Bishop of Palmeira dos Índios, Alagoas
- Henrique Soares da Costa (2009–2014), appointed Bishop of Palmares, Pernambuco

=== Other priests of this diocese who became bishops ===
- Manuel Raimundo de Melo, appointed Bishop of Caetité, Bahia in 1914
- Avelar Brandão Vilela. appointed

Bishop of Petrolina, Pernambuco in 1946; future Cardinal

- Luciano José Cabral Duarte. Appointed Auxiliary Bishop of Aracaju, Sergipe in 1966.
- Marco Eugênio Galrão Leite de Almeida, appointed Bishop of Estância, Sergipe in 2003
- Carlos Alberto dos Santos, appointed Bishop of Teixeira de Freitas-Caravelas, Bahia in 2005
- Valdemir Vicente Andrade Santos, appointed Auxiliary Bishop of Fortaleza, Ceara in 2018

== Sources and external links ==
- GCatholic.org with Google mapa & - satellite photo; data for all sections
- Diocese website
