= House at Praça Rio Branco No. 35 =

Historical colonial house in Brazil

- Casa à Praça Rio Branco, nº 35
- Location within Brazil

General information
- Location: Estância, Sergipe, Brazil
- Coordinates: 12.9731°S 38.5132°W

Technical details
- Floor count: 2

National Historic Heritage of Brazil
- Designated: 1962
- Reference no.: 679

The House at Praça Rio Branco No. 35 (Portuguese: Casa à Praça Rio Branco, nº 35) is a sobrado, or Portuguese Colonial multi-story house, in Estância, Sergipe, Brazil. It house the Clube Republicano (Republican Club), the first organization of this size in the Province of Sergipe Del Rey. It also served as the residence of Dom Pedro II during his visit to the city.

The house dates to the first quarter of the 19th century, but details on its origin are lacking. The house has two stories with four roof eaves and a wooden frame. The ground floor has four doors and three windows with alternating curved poles and wooden jambs. The second floor has seven windows with balconies on wooden balustrades. The lateral façade of the upper floor have windows similar to those of the main façade. The rear façade is an extension of the upper floor and is supported by masonry pilasters. The extension of the house is of more recent construction.

== Protected status ==
The House at Praça Rio Branco No. 35 was listed as a historic structure by the National Institute of Historic and Artistic Heritage in 1962. It was included in the Book of Historical Works as Inscription no. 679. The directive is dated July 7, 1962.
