= Diocese of Parnaíba =

Catholic ecclesiastical territory

Diocese of Parnaíba Dioecesis Parnaibensis

Catholic
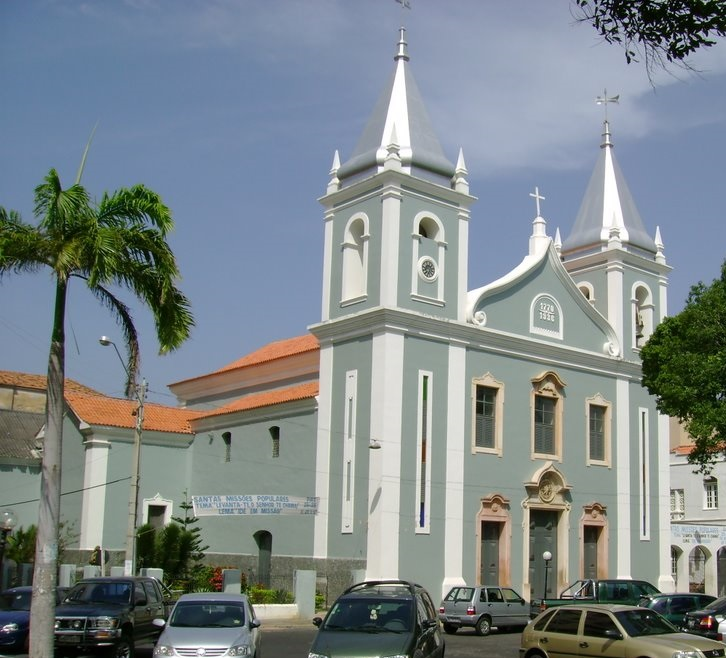
- Cathedral of Our Lady Mother of Divine Grace

- Coat of arms

Location
- Country: Brazil
- Ecclesiastical province: Teresina

Statistics
- Area: 20,565 km^{2} (7,940 sq mi)
- Population: Total; Catholics: (as of 2004); 550,000; 495,000 (90%)

Information
- Rite: Latin Rite
- Established: 16 December 1944 (81 years ago)
- Cathedral: Catedral de Nossa Senhora Mãe da Divina Graça

Current leadership
- Pope: Leo XIV
- Bishop: Edivalter Andrade
- Metropolitan Archbishop: Jacinto Furtado de Brito Sobrinho
- Bishops emeritus: Alfredo Schäffler

Website
- www.diocesedeparnaiba.org.br

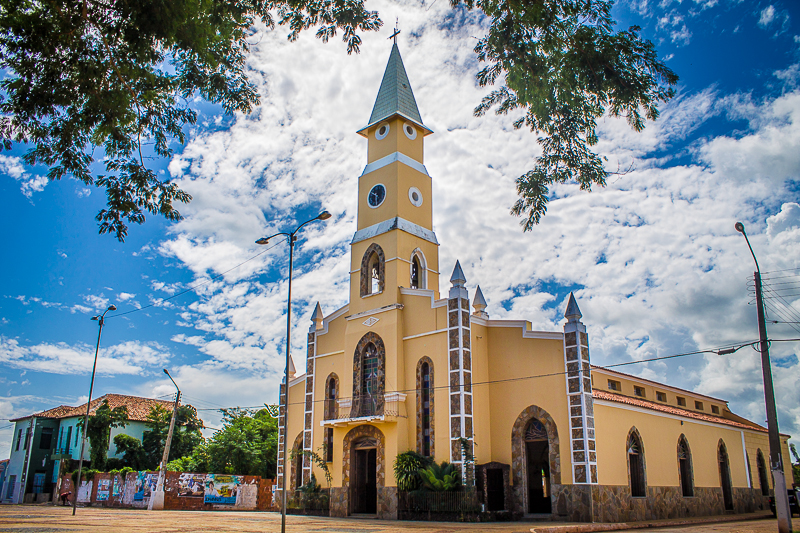
Parish of Our Lady of Good Hope

The Roman Catholic Diocese of Parnaíba (Latin: Dioecesis Parnaibensis) is a diocese located in the city of Parnaíba in the ecclesiastical province of Teresina in Brazil.

== History ==
- 16 December 1944: Established as Diocese of Parnaíba from the Diocese of Piaui

== Bishops of Parnaíba ==
- Felipe Benito Condurú Pacheco (1946.02.07 – 1959.01.17)
- Paulo Hipólito de Souza Libório (1959.06.20 – 1980.04.23)
- Edvaldo Gonçalves Amaral, S.D.B. (later Archbishop) (1980.09.02 – 1985.10.24)
- Joaquim Rufino do Rêgo (1986.03.25 – 2001.02.21)
- Alfredo Schäffler (2001.02.21 – 2016.08.24)
- Juarez Sousa da Silva (4 August 2016 – 4 January 2023)
- Edivalter Andrade (8 November 2023 – Present)

=== Coadjutor bishops ===
- Alfredo Schäffler (2000-2001)
- Juarez Sousa Da Silva (2016)
