= Salinas da Margarida =

- Municipality
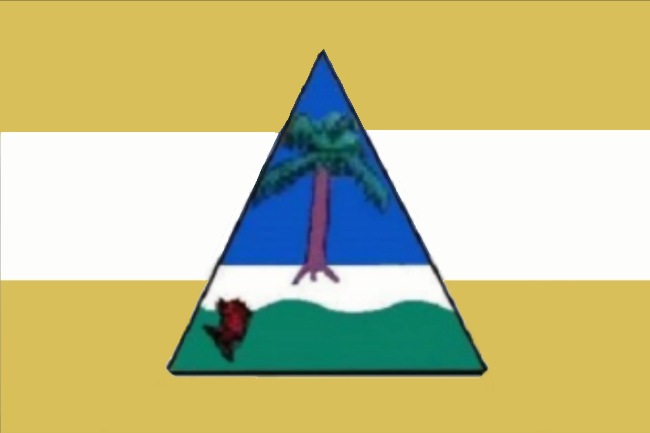
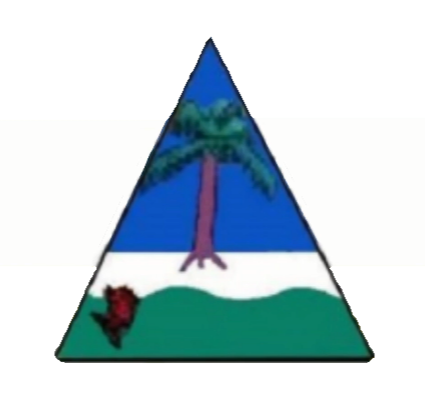
- Flag Coat of arms
- Interactive map of Salinas da Margarida
- Coordinates: 12°52′S 38°46′W
- Country: Brazil
- Region: Nordeste
- State: Bahia

Population (2020)
  - Total: 15,862
- Time zone: UTC−3 (BRT)

Salinas da Margarida is a municipality in the state of Bahia in the North-East region of Brazil.

== See also ==
- List of municipalities in Bahia
