= Juarez Sousa da Silva =

20th and 21st-century Roman Catholic Archbishop

His Grace, The Most Reverend, Mons. Dom Juarez Sousa da Silva
- Metropolitan Archbishop of Teresina
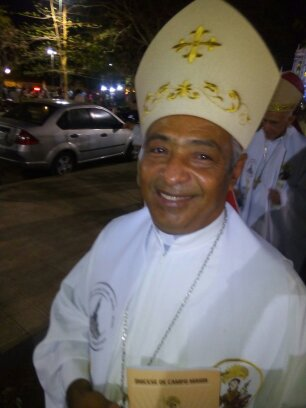
- Church: Roman Catholic Church
- Archdiocese: Teresina
- Province: Teresina
- Appointed: 04 January 2023
- Installed: 4 January 2023
- Predecessor: Jacinto Furtado de Brito Sobrinho
- Previous posts: Bishop of Oeiras (2008-2016); Bishop of Parnaiba (2016-2023)

Orders
- Ordination: 19 March 1994
- Consecration: 27 February 2008 by Lorenzo Baldisseri

Personal details
- Born: Juarez Sousa da Silva; 30 June 1961 (age 65) Barras, Piauí
- Denomination: Roman Catholic
- Occupation: Archbishop, Clergyman
- Profession: Theologian, Philosopher.
- Education: Pontifical Gregorian University
- Motto: UT VITAM HABEANT
- Coat of arms: Dom Juarez Sousa da Silva's coat of arms

Dom Juarez Sousa da Silva is a clergyman, diocesan priest, prelate, theologian, and philosopher of the Catholic Church in Brazil who has been Metropolitan Archbishop of Teresina since January 2023. He was installed there in February in Metropolitan Cathedral of Teresina. He was previously Bishop of Oeiras (2008–2016) and Parnaiba (2016–2023).
