= Diocese of São Raimundo Nonato =

Catholic ecclesiastical territory

Diocese of São Raimundo Nonato Dioecesis Raymundianus

Catholic

Location
- Country: Brazil
- Ecclesiastical province: Teresina

Statistics
- Area: 39,316 km^{2} (15,180 sq mi)
- Population: Total; Catholics: (as of 2014); 202,600; 183,300 (90.5%)

Information
- Rite: Latin Rite
- Established: 17 December 1960 (65 years ago)
- Cathedral: Catedral São Ramundo

Current leadership
- Pope: Leo XIV
- Bishop: Ronilton Souza de Araújo
- Metropolitan Archbishop: Jacinto Furtado de Brito Sobrinho

Website
- www.diocesedesaoraimundo.com.br

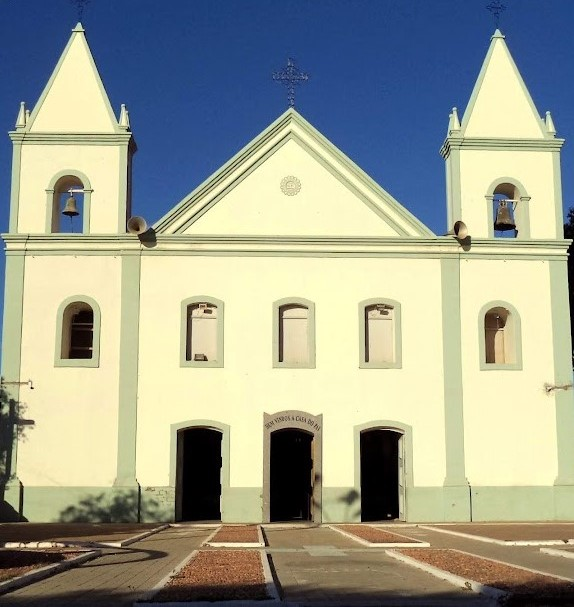
Cathedral of São Raimundo Nonato, São Raimundo Nonato, Piauí

The Roman Catholic Diocese of São Raimundo Nonato (Latin: Dioecesis Raymundianus) is a Latin suffragan diocese in the ecclesiastical province of the metropolitan Teresina, in northeastern Brazil's Piauí state.

Its cathedral episcopal see is Catedral São Raimundo, located in the city of São Raimundo Nonato.

In 2010, the diocese had an area of 39,316 square kilometres; a total population of 193,000; a Catholic population of 174,000; 23 priests; and 42 religious.

== History ==
- Established on 17 December 1960 as Territorial Prelature of São Raimundo Nonato, on territory split off from the Territorial Prelature of Bom Jesus do Piauí
- Promoted on 3 October 1981 as Diocese of São Raimundo Nonato.

== Ordinaries ==
Territorial (Bishop-)Prelates of São Raimundo Nonato

- Amadeu González Ferreiros, Mercederians (O. de M.) (1961.12.23 – retired 1967.12.28), Titular Bishop of Metræ (1963.02.18 – death 1995.03.20)
- Cândido Lorenzo González, O. de M. (1969.12.05 – 1981.10.03 see below, promoted as first bishop), Titular Bishop of Skradin (1969.12.05 – 1978.05.26)

Bishops of São Raimundo Nonato

- Cândido Lorenzo González, O. de M. (see above 1981.10.03 – retired 2002.07.17)
- Pedro Brito Guimarães (2002.07.17 – 2010.10.20), later Metropolitan Archbishop of Palmas (Brazil) (2010.10.20 – ...)
- João Santos Cardoso (2011.12.14 – 2015.06.24), later Bishop of Bom Jesus da Lapa (Brazil) (2015.06.24 – ...)
- Eduardo Zielski (2016.03.02 – retired 2023.07.19)
- Ronilton Souza de Araújo (2023.07.19 – Present)

== Sources and external links ==
- GCatholic.org, with incumbent bio links
- Catholic Hierarchy
- Diocese website (Portuguese)
