= José Palmeira Lessa =

- Archbishop Emeritus of Aracajú
- Church: Catholic Church
- Archdiocese: Archdiocese of Aracaju
- In office: 26 August 1998 – 18 January 2017
- Predecessor: Luciano José Cabral Duarte
- Successor: João José da Costa
- Previous posts: Coadjutor Archbishop of Aracaju (1996-1998); Bishop of Propriá (1987-1996); Titular Bishop of Site (1982-1987); Auxiliary Bishop of Tio de Janiero (1982-1987)

Orders
- Ordination: 3 July 1968 by Jaime de Barros Câmara
- Consecration: 24 August 1982 by Eugênio Sales

Personal details
- Born: 18 January 1942 (age 84) Coruripe, Alagoas, Brazil

José Palmeira Lessa (born 18 January 1942) is a prelate of the Roman Catholic Church. He served as auxiliary bishop of São Sebastião do Rio de Janeiro from 1982 till 1987, when he became bishop of Propriá. In 1996 he became coadjutor archbishop of Aracajú, succeeding as archbishop in 1998.

== Life ==
Born in Coruripe, Palmeira Lessa was ordained to the priesthood on 3 July 1968.

On 21 June 1982, he was appointed auxiliary bishop of São Sebastião do Rio de Janeiro and titular bishop of Sita. Palmeira Lessa received his episcopal consecration on the following 24 August from Eugênio Cardinal de Araújo Sales, archbishop of São Sebastião do Rio de Janeiro, with the bishop of Guaxupé, José Alberto Lopes de Castro Pinto, and the bishop of Vitória da Conquista, Celso José Pinto da Silva, serving as co-consecrators.

On 30 October 1987, he was appointed bishop of Propriá. He served in this position for nine years, before being appointed coadjutor archbishop of Aracajú on 6 December 1996, succeeding as archbishop on 26 August 1998 after the retirement of his predecessor Luciano José Cabral Duarte.
