= Josafá Menezes da Silva =

Brazilian archbishop and clergyman

His Excellency, The Most Reverend, Monsignor. Josafá Menezes da Silva S. T. L., S. T. D.
- Metropolitan Archbishop of Aracaju
- Church: Roman Catholic Church
- Archdiocese: Aracaju
- Province: Aracaju
- Metropolis: Aracaju
- Appointed: 13 March 2024
- Installed: 25 May 2024
- Predecessor: Dom. Frei. João José da Costa, O. Carm.
- Successor: Incumbent

Orders
- Ordination: 14 March 1989 by Dom. Frei. Lucas Moreira Neves, O.P.
- Consecration: 10 March 2005
- Rank: Metropolitan Archbishop

Personal details
- Born: Josafá Menezes da Silva; January 2, 1959 (age 67) Salinas da Margarida, State of Bahia, Brazil.
- Denomination: Catholic Church
- Occupation: Archbishop, Prelate
- Education: Pontifical Gregorian University
- Motto: Praedica Verbum
- Coat of arms

Josafá Menezes da Silva (born 2 January 1959) is a Brazilian prelate of the Catholic Church and holds the position of metropolitan archbishop of the Roman Catholic Archdiocese of Aracaju. His prior positions include auxiliary bishop of the Roman Catholic Archdiocese of São Salvador da Bahia from 2005 to 2010, bishop of the Roman Catholic Diocese of Barreiras from 2010 to 2019, and metropolitan archbishop of the Roman Catholic Archdiocese of Vitória da Conquista from 2019 to 2024.

== Early life and education ==
Josafá Menezes da Silva was born in Salinas da Margarida, State of Bahia, Brazil. He completed his philosophical studies at the Catholic University of São Salvador da Bahia and theological studies at the Pontifical Gregorian University. Ordained on 14 March 1989 by Lucas Moreira Neves, O.P., he became a priest within the metropolitan archdiocese of São Salvador da Bahia. From 1989 to 2003, he served in various capacities including pastor of São João parish in Salvador, deputy rector at the propedeutical seminary of Santa Terezinha de Lisieux, assistant archdiocesan bursar, coordinator of the archdiocesan Theological Commission, and professor at several institutions. He earned a postgraduate degree in theology and a doctorate in Christian anthropology from the Pontifical Lateran University.

== Episcopal service ==
Appointed on 12 January 2005 as titular bishop of Gummi in Byzacena and auxiliary of São Salvador da Bahia, Josafá Menezes da Silva was ordained on 10 March by Gerardo Majella Agnelo. On 15 December 2010, he was named bishop of Barreiras. He served as metropolitan archbishop of the Roman Catholic Archdiocese of Vitória da Conquista starting on 9 October 2019. On 13 March 2024, Pope Francis appointed him metropolitan archbishop of the Roman Catholic Archdiocese of Aracaju, succeeding Dom. Frei. João José da Costa, O. Carm., following his resignation.
