= Ksar Sbahi =

Coordinates: 36°05′N 7°15′E

- Commune and town
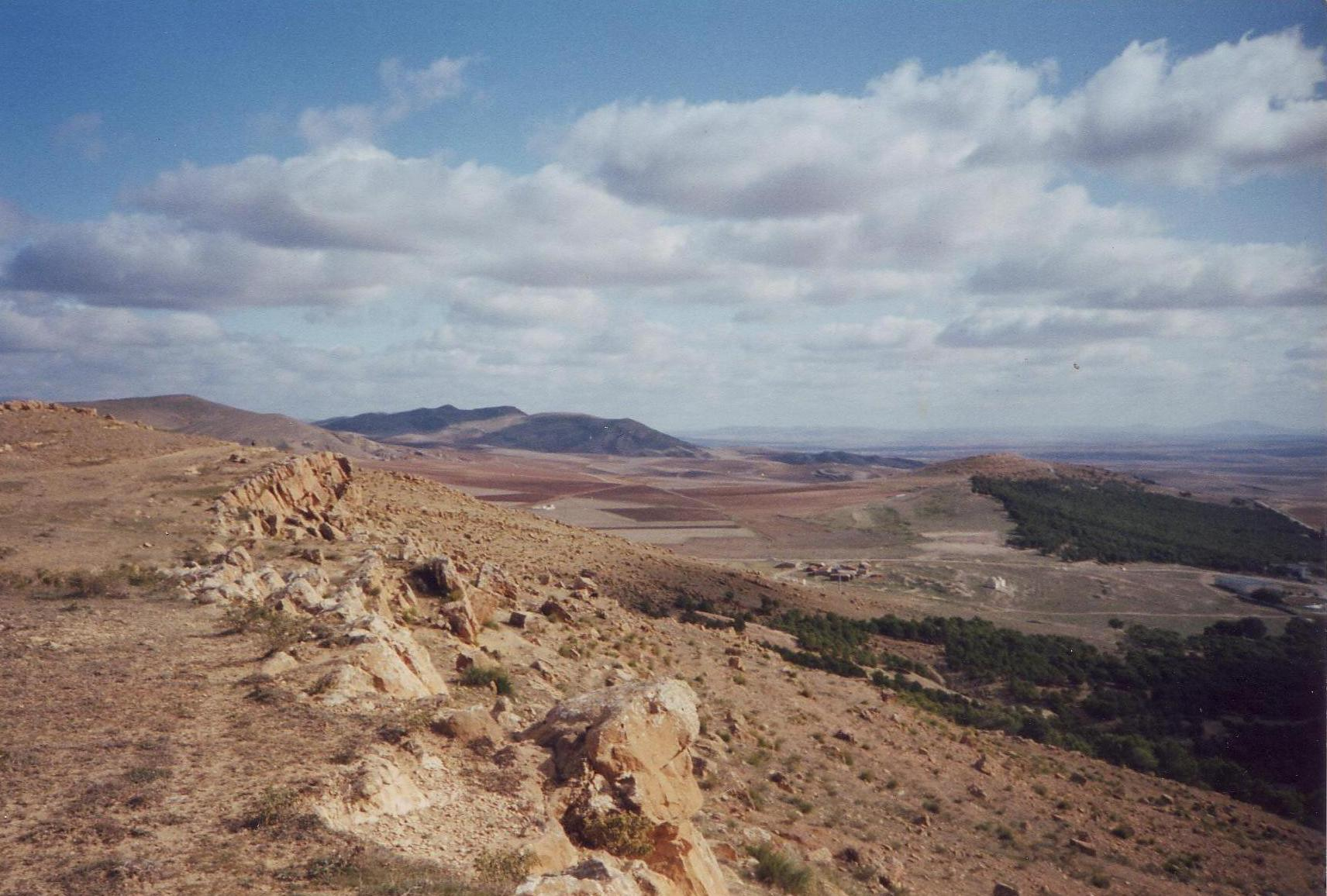
- Landscape of the Hautes Plaines in the winter

- Country: Algeria
- Province: Oum El Bouaghi Province

Population (1998)
  - Total: 11,095
- Time zone: UTC+1 (CET)

Ksar Sbahi is a town and commune in Oum El Bouaghi Province, Algeria and the site of Ancient Gadiaufala, a Roman city and former bishopric, now a Latin Catholic titular see.

According to the 1998 census it has a population of 11,095.

== History ==
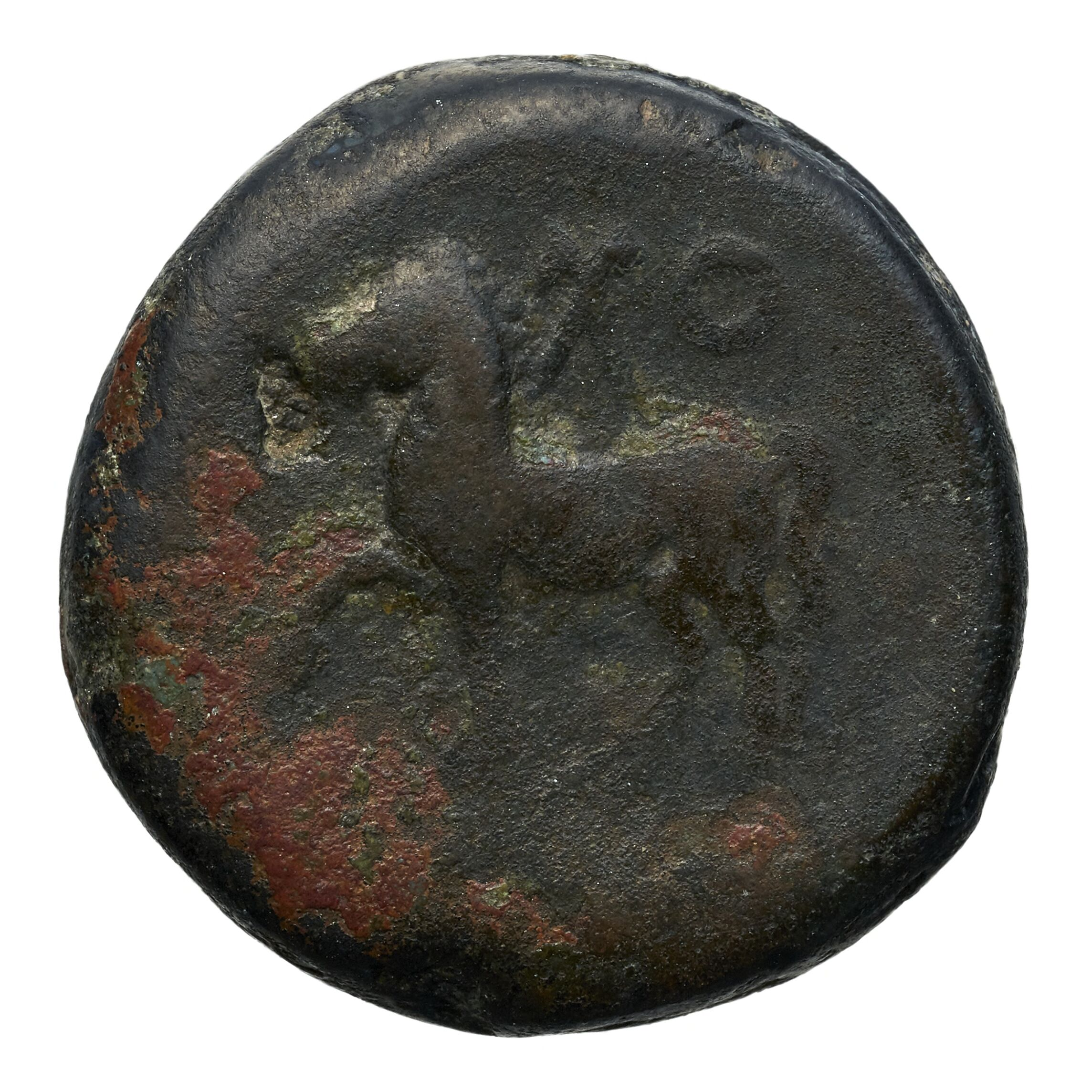
A Punic coin of Gadiauphala with the legend 𐤏𐤀 (ʿʾ)

Gadiaufala was important enough in the Roman province of Numidia to become a suffragan bishopric of its capital's Metropolitan Archbishop of ?Cirta, but later faded.

=== Titular see ===
The diocese was nominally restored as a titular bishopric in 1933. It has had the following incumbents, all of the lowest (episcopal) rank :

- Luciano José Cabral Duarte (1966.07.14 – 1971.02.12), as Auxiliary Bishop of Aracaju (Brazil) (1966.07.14 – 1971.02.12); later succeeding as Metropolitan Archbishop of Aracaju (1971.02.12 – 1998.08.26), First Vice-President of Latin American Episcopal Council (1979 – 1983)
- Rodolfo Quezada Toruño (1972.04.05 – 1975.09.11), as Auxiliary Bishop of Zacapa (Guatemala) (1972.04.05 – 1975.09.11), promoted Coadjutor Bishop of Zacapa (1975.09.11 – 1980.02.16), succeeding as Bishop of Zacapa (1980.02.16 – 2001.06.19), also Bishop-Prelate of Santo Cristo de Esquipulas (Guatemala) (1986.06.24 – 2001.06.19), President of Episcopal Conference of Guatemala (1988 – 1992), later Metropolitan Archbishop of Guatemala (Guatemala) (2001.06.19 – 2010.10.02), President of Episcopal Conference of Guatemala (2002 – 2006), created Cardinal-Priest of S. Saturnino (2003.10.21 [2004.03.13] – 2012.06.04)
- Jesús Arturo Roldán (1980.05.26 – 1991.11.09)
- Elmo Noel Joseph Perera (1992.12.17 – 1995.06.01)
- Antonio Federico Gatti (1996.07.01 – 1998.07.09)
- Dieudonné Bogmis (1999.02.09 – 2004.10.15)
- François Xavier Lê Văn Hồng (2005.02.19 – 2012.08.18), as Auxiliary Bishop of Huê (Vietnam) (2005.02.19 – 2012.08.18), next Metropolitan Archbishop of Huê (Vietnam) (2012.08.18 – ...), also Vice-President of Episcopal Conference of Vietnam (2013 – ...)
- Joseph Đinh Đức Đạo (2013.02.28 – 2015.06.04)
- Bishop-elect Natale Paganelli, Xaverians (S.X.) (2015.07.18 – ...), Apostolic Administrator of Makeni (Sierra Leone)

== Source and External links ==
- GigaCatholic, with incumbent biography links
