= Archdiocese of Teresina =

Catholic ecclesiastical territory

Coordinates: 5.0954°S 42.8133°W

Metropolitan Archdiocese of Teresina Archidioecesis Metropolitae Teresiana

Catholic
- Coat of arms

Location
- Country: Brazil

Statistics
- Area: 26,995 km^{2} (10,423 sq mi)
- Population: Total; Catholics: (as of 2003); 1,052,564; 958,197 (91.0%)

Information
- Rite: Latin Rite
- Established: 20 February 1902 (124 years ago)
- Cathedral: Catedral Metropolitana Nossa Senhora das Dores

Current leadership
- Pope: Leo XIV
- Metropolitan Archbishop: Juarez Sousa da Silva
- Bishops emeritus: Miguel Fenelon Câmara Filho

Website
- www.arquidiocesedeteresina.org.br

The Roman Catholic Metropolitan Archdiocese of Teresina (Latin: Archidioecesis Teresiana) is an archdiocese located in the city of Teresina in Brazil.

== History ==
- 20 February 1902: Established as Diocese of Piauí from the Diocese of São Luís do Maranhão
- 16 December 1944: Renamed as Diocese of Teresina
- 9 August 1952: Promoted as Metropolitan Archdiocese of Teresina

== Bishops ==
Bishops of Piauí

- Joaquim Antônio d’Almeida (1905.12.14 – 1910.10.23)
- Quintino Rodrigues de Oliveira e Silva (2013.02.17, did not take effect)
- Octaviano Pereira de Albuquerque (1914.04.02 – 1922.10.27), appointed Archbishop of São Luís do Maranhão
- Severino Vieira de Melo (1923.06.08 – 1944.12.16)

Bishops of Teresina

- Severino Vieira de Melo (1944.12.16 – 1952.08.09)

Archbishops of Teresina

- Severino Vieira de Melo (1952.08.09 – 1955.05.27)
- Avelar Brandão Vilela (1955.11.05 – 1971.03.25), appointed Archbishop of São Salvador da Bahia (Cardinal in 1973)
- José Freire Falcão (1971.11.25 – 1984.02.15), appointed Archbishop of Brasília, Distrito Federal (Cardinal in 1988)
- Miguel Fenelon Câmara Filho (1984.10.07 – 2001.02.21)
- Celso José Pinto da Silva (2001.02.21 – 2008.09.03)
- Sérgio da Rocha (2008.09.03 – 15 June 2011), appointed Archbishop of Brasília, Distrito Federal (Cardinal in 2016)
- Jacinto Furtado de Brito Sobrinho (22 February 2012 – 4 January 2023)
- Juarez Sousa da Silva (4 January 2023 – present)

=== Coadjutor bishops ===
  - Sérgio da Rocha (2007-2008); future Cardinal

=== Auxiliary bishops ===
  - Raimundo de Castro e Silva (1950-1954), appointed Bishop of Oeiras
  - José Gonzalez Alonso (1994-2001), appointed Bishop of Cajazeiras, Paraíba

=== Other priests of this diocese who became bishop ===
  - Júlio César Souza de Jesus, appointed Auxiliary Bishop of Fortaleza, Ceara in 2018

== Suffragan dioceses ==
- Diocese of Bom Jesus do Gurguéia
- Diocese of Campo Maior
- Diocese of Floriano
- Diocese of Oeiras
- Diocese of Parnaíba
- Diocese of Picos
- Diocese of São Raimundo Nonato
