= José Bezerra Coutinho =

- Bishop of Estância (Emeritus)
- Church: Roman Catholic Church
- See: Estância
- In office: 1961–1985
- Predecessor: None
- Successor: Hildebrando Mendes Costa
- Previous posts: Bishop of Sobral; Priest

Orders
- Ordination: December 3, 1933

Personal details
- Born: February 7, 1910 Capistrano, Brazil
- Died: November 7, 2008 (aged 98) Fortaleza, Ceará

José Bezerra Coutinho (February 7, 1910 – November 7, 2008) was a Brazilian bishop of the Roman Catholic Church. When he died at the age of 98, he was the sixth-oldest bishop in the Catholic Church, and the oldest Brazilian bishop.

== Biography ==
Coutinho was born in Capistrano, in the state of Ceará, in 1910. He was ordained a priest on December 3, 1933, then appointed auxiliary bishop of Sobral, Ceará, on August 4, 1956. Coutinho was appointed bishop of Estância, Sergipe, on January 28, 1961, retiring as bishop of Estância on June 1, 1985.

He was Titular Bishop of Uthina from October 28, 1956, to January 28, 1961.

He died in Fortaleza, Ceará, of cardiac arrest on November 7, 2008.

== See also ==
- Roman Catholic Diocese of Estância
