= Nicives =

Ancient Roman town

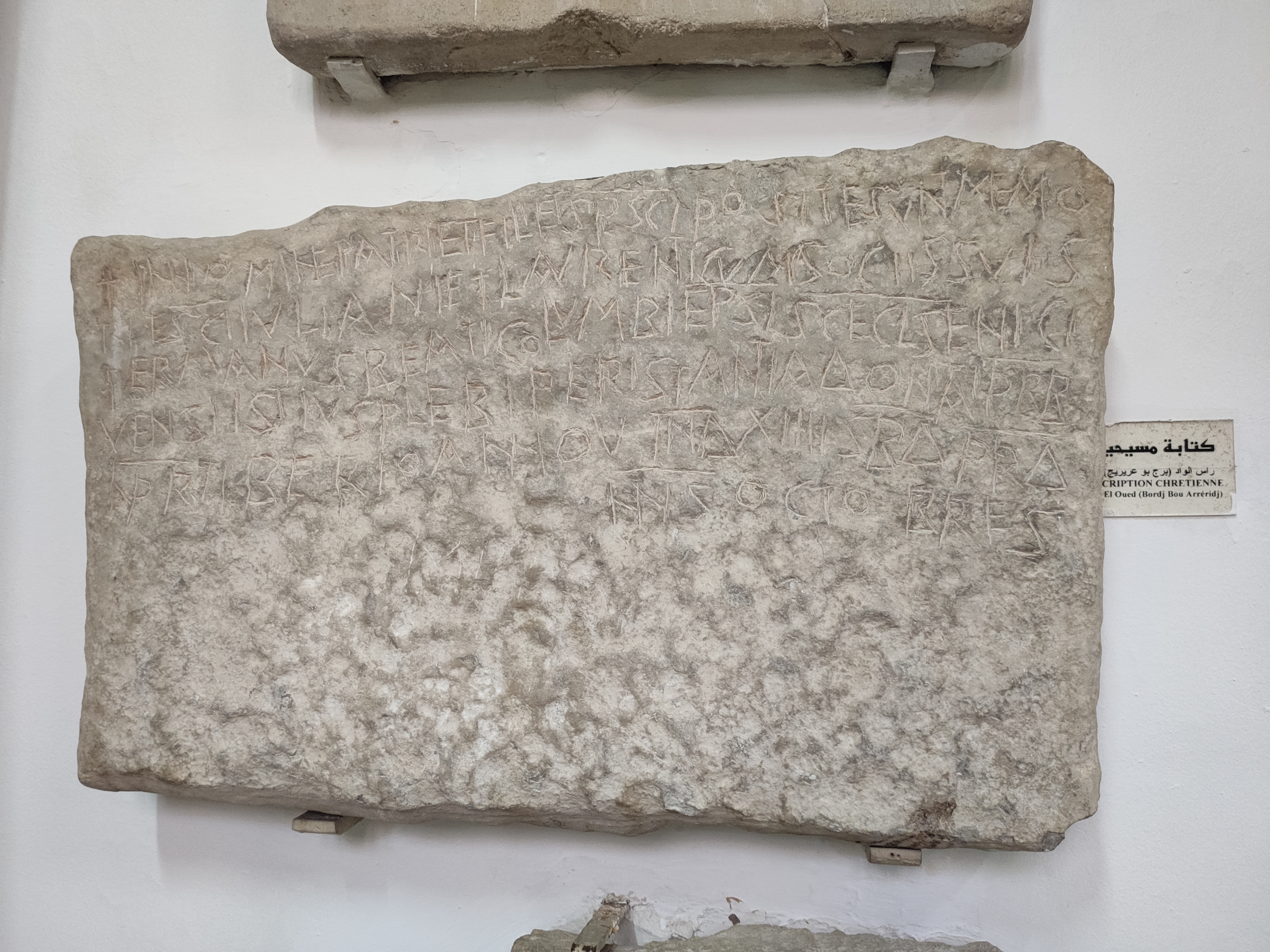
- The Columbus inscription in the National Museum of Antiquities and Islamic Arts, Algiers
- Location: Algeria
- Region: Ngaous

Nicives or Nicivibus, identifiable with N'Gaous in Batna Province, Algeria, was an ancient Roman town of the Roman province of Numidia.

== History ==
The town was the seat of a late antiquity Christian bishopric There are three bishops known from Niceives.

- At the 411 Conference of Carthage, which saw the Catholics and Donatists, debate, the town was represented by the Catholic Justus episcopus Nicibensis, who did not have Donatist counterpart.
- Among the Catholic bishops called to Carthage in 484 by King Huneric the Vandal was Paulus Nibensis, which according to Mesnage is to be read as Nicibensis.
- Finally a Byzantine inscription discovered in the region of N'Gaous and dating from 580 shows the name Columbus: according to the J. Mesnage this Columbus may be the bishop referred to in some letters written by Gregory the Great at the beginning of the 7th century who was appointed to investigate Maximianus bishop of Pudenziana, accused by his deacons of being bribed by Donatists.

The town lasted as a legal entity, through the Byzantine period, till the Muslim conquest of the Maghreb in the 7th century.

Today Nicives survives as a titular bishopric of the Roman Catholic Church and the current bishop is Andrzej Jerzy Zglejszewski, auxiliary bishop of Rockville.

== Bishops ==
- Justus † (mentioned in 411)
- Paul † (mentioned in 484)
- Columbus † (before 581 – after 602)
- Angelo Félix Mugnol † (1966–1969)
- Guillermo Escobar Vélez † (1969–1971)
- Abel Alonso Núñez † (1971–1976)
- Stanley Joseph Ott † (1976–1983)
- José Mário Stroeher (1983–1986), bishop of Rio Grande from 1986
- William Jerome McCormack † (1986–2013)
- Andrzej Jerzy Zglejszewski, from February 11, 2014

== See also ==
- Catholic Church in Algeria
