= Adelio Tomasin =

Italian Roman Catholic prelate (1930–2024)

His Excellency Adelio Tomasin
- Bishop Emeritus of Quixadá
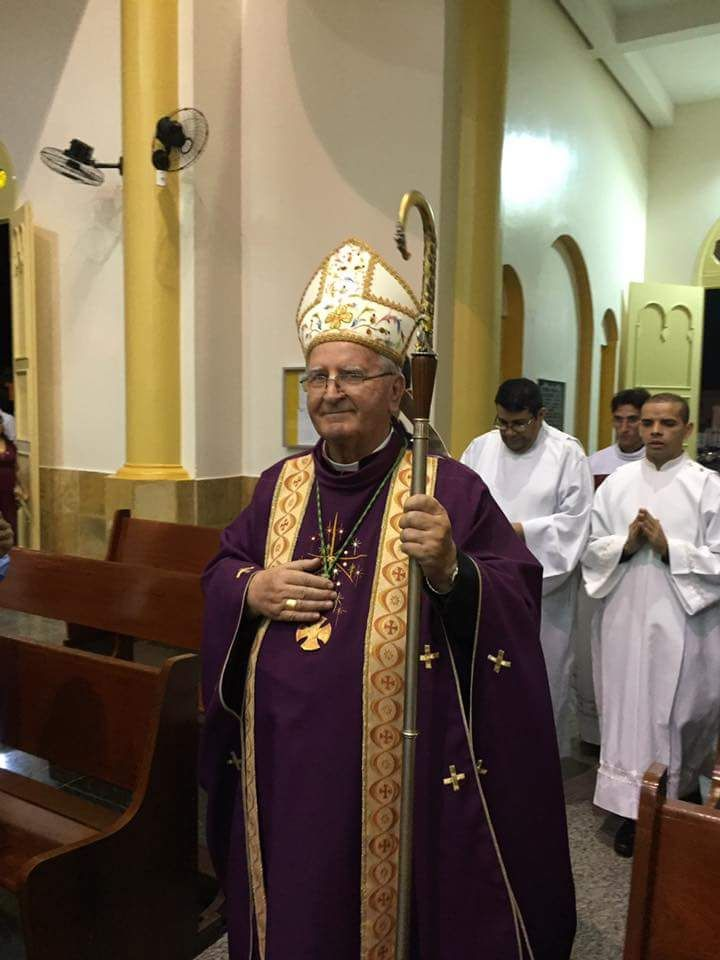
- Tomasin in 2020
- Archdiocese: Fortaleza
- Diocese: Quixadá
- Appointed: 16 March 1988
- Term ended: 3 January 2007
- Predecessor: Joaquim Rufino do Rêgo
- Successor: Ângelo Pignoli

Orders
- Ordination: 26 March 1955
- Consecration: 26 March 1988 by João Cláudio Colling

Personal details
- Born: 27 April 1930 Montegaldella, Italy
- Died: 30 September 2024 (aged 94) Quixadá, Ceará, Brazil
- Motto: Quaerite primum regnum Dei

Adelio Tomasin (27 April 1930 – 30 September 2024) was an Italian Roman Catholic prelate. He was bishop of Quixadá from 1988 to 2007. Tomasin died in Quixadá, Ceará on 30 September 2024, at the age of 94.
