= Márcia Mendonça =

Brazilian artist (1949–1998)

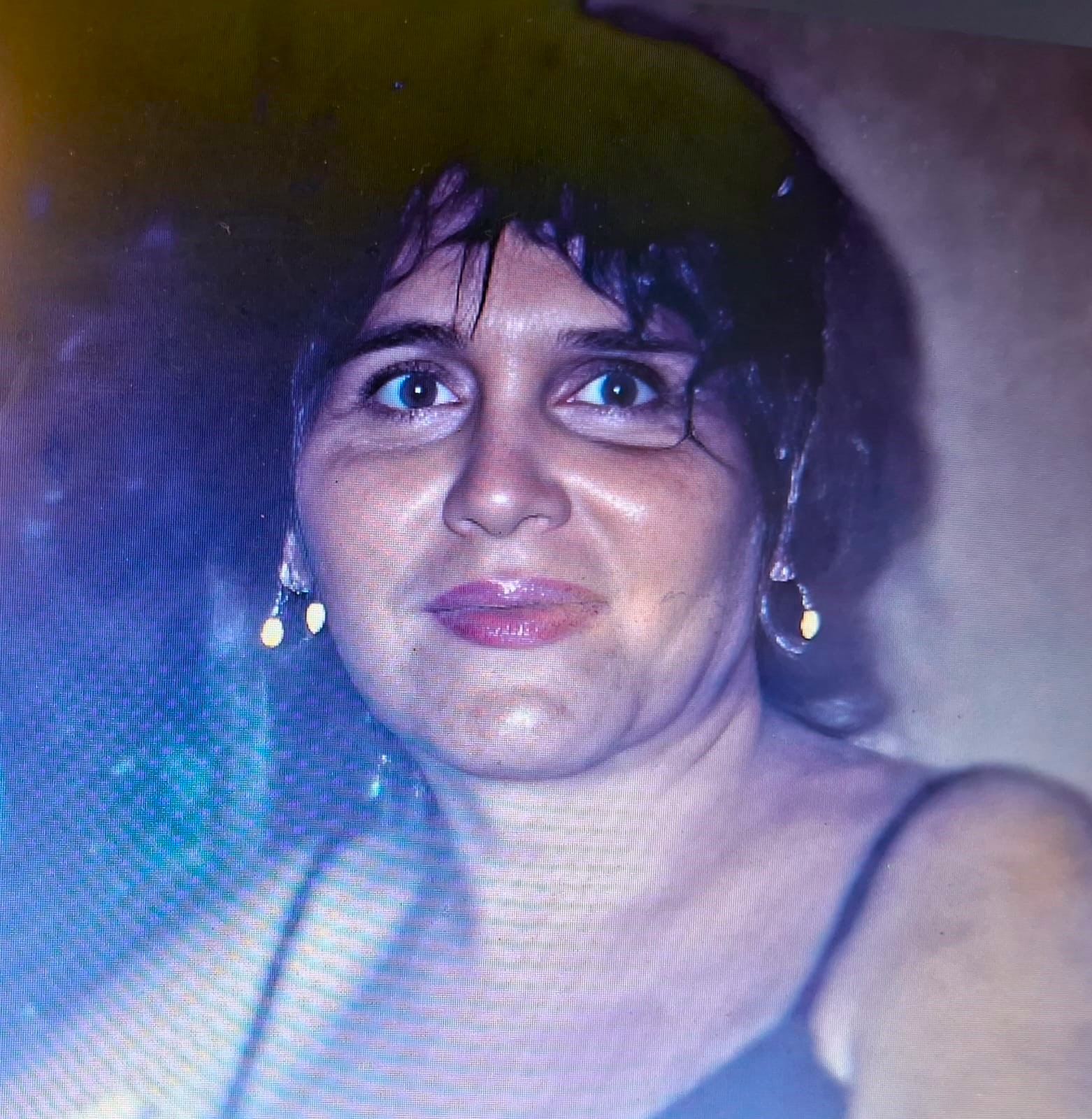
- Born: 13 February 1949; Limoeiro do Norte, Ceará, Brazil
- Died: 13 January 1998 (aged 48)
- Cause of death: AIDS
- Education: University of Recife
- Occupations: Artist; Former friar
- Years active: 1969–1998
- Known for: Catholic religious art

Márcia Maia Mendonça (13 February 1949 – 13 January 1998) was a Brazilian artist, known for her religious art, including paintings and sculptures. A Franciscan friar who later left the clergy and came out as a transgender woman, Mendonça's work has gained greater attention in the years following her death, particularly for her Cusco-style paintings.

== Biography ==
Mendonça was born in 1949 in Limoeiro do Norte, a municipality in the state of Ceará in northeastern Brazil. She was the daughter of Fausto Mendonça and Francisca Maria Mendonça, who were middle class Catholics; Francisca was a teacher, while Fausto was a tax collector. Fausto was a close friend of Otávio de Alencar Santiago, a priest within the Diocese of Limoeiro do Norte, and the church played a significant part in Mendonça's childhood.

By the age of 20, Mendonça was working as an artist, and gained some attention in the local area of Limoeiro do Norte after producing Deusa Olímpica (lit. 'Olympic Goddess'), a statue that was installed at an intersection to mark the fifth Jaguaribanos Olympics. She went on to make other prominent sculptures in the municipality, including one to commemorate Aureliano de Matos, the diocese's first bishop.

Mendonça, a devout Catholic, decided to become a Franciscan friar, becoming a brother of the third Order of Friars Minor Capuchin; for a time, she was a missionary in Maranhão, and between 1980 and 1981 she completed restoration work on the high altar of Limoeiro do Norte's cathedral. She was excluded from the community after coming out as a transgender woman, and changing her name to Márcia. Mendonça moved to Fortaleza, where she became part of a Capuchin choir and began producing art for local churches and other Catholic spaces. She subsequently started formally studying fine art at the University of Recife.

Mendonça continued to display her art in Fortaleza, including at the Salão de Abril, though she often signed her paintings using her birth name rather than her chosen female name. After experiencing a personal crisis, she decided to emigrate to Germany, where she initially worked as a painter in Cologne; she later moved to Bois de Boulogne in Paris, France, where she worked for a time as a sex worker.

Upon returning to Brazil in 1994, Mendonça underwent gender-affirming surgery in Jundiaí. During the procedure, she was diagnosed as having HIV. Mendonça went back to Ceará, where she was supported by Brother Domingues, a Capuchin friar based at the Gruta convent in Guaramiranga. She became part of the local religious community there, producing art for Catholic institutions and living by a private chapel in Eusébio. She also played a religious woman in the 1999 film Milagre em Juazeiro, where she advised the production team on religious matters. While Mendonça was less visible following her transition, which has retrospectively been attributed to prejudices against transgender people at the time, she was known to host gatherings and sell her paintings, and was interviewed by Lúcio Brasileiro in a televised interview.

Mendonça died on 13 January 1998; she had been increasingly ill in her later years, with her cause of death commonly accepted to have been HIV or AIDS. She continued painting during her illness, including from her hospital bed.

== Artwork ==
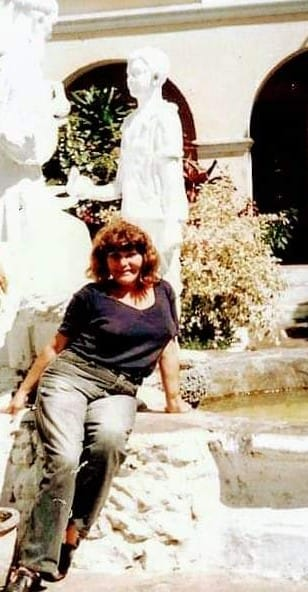
Undated photo of Mendonça

Most of Mendonça's work is found in her hometown of Limoeiro do Norte, as well as Fortaleza where she later lived and studied. Mendonça's art has been described as encompassing and being inspired by several artistic styles, including realism and Baroque; she has been most closely associated with the Cusco school of art.

Mendonça's painting Nossa Senhora da Conceição adorns the ceiling of the main church in Limoeiro do Norte; she also painted several panels at a convent adjacent to the Church of the Sacred Heart of Jesus in Fortaleza, as well as at the Porciúncula Seminary and the Gruna Convent.

In 2022, the Vocational Technological Centre in Limoeiro de Norte renamed one of its buildings after Mendonça; the space had previously been named after her, but using her birth name. In 2024, the Ceará Judiciary posthumously altered Mendonça's civil registration to reflect her chosen name, Márcia, at the request of her siblings.

On 29 January 2023, to commemorate Transgender Day of Remembrance, the Pinacoteca do Ceará held a public tribute to Mendonça, both to raise awareness of her life and art, and also to provide training about basic concepts and facts about transgender people.
