= José Ramalho =

José Ramalho may refer to:

- José Ramalho (rower) (1901–1967), Brazilian rower
- José Mauro Ramalho (1925–2019), Brazilian bishop
- José Luiz Aguiar e Ramalho (born 1964), Brazilian handball player
- José Ramalho (canoeist) (born 1982), Portuguese marathon canoeist
