= José Haring =

German Roman Catholic prelate (1940–2023)

His Excellency José Haring
- Bishop Emeritus of Limoeiro do Norte
- Metropolis: Fortaleza
- Appointed: 19 January 2000
- Term ended: 10 May 2017
- Predecessor: Manuel Edmilson da Cruz
- Successor: André Vital Félix da Silva

Orders
- Ordination: 22 July 1967
- Consecration: 20 March 2000 by José Palmeira Lessa

Personal details
- Born: 20 December 1940 Gronau, Germany
- Died: 24 December 2023 (aged 83) Fortaleza, Brazil

José Haring (born Josef Haring; 20 December 1940 – 24 December 2023) was a German Roman Catholic prelate. He was bishop of Limoeiro do Norte from 2000 to 2017. He died on 24 December 2023, at the age of 83.

Catholic Church titles
Preceded by Manuel Edmilson da Cruz	Bishop of Limoeiro do Norte; 2000–2017	Succeeded by André Vital Félix da Silva
