= Diocese of Quixadá =

Catholic ecclesiastical territory

Diocese of Quixadá Dioecesis Quixadensis Diocese de Quixadá

Catholic
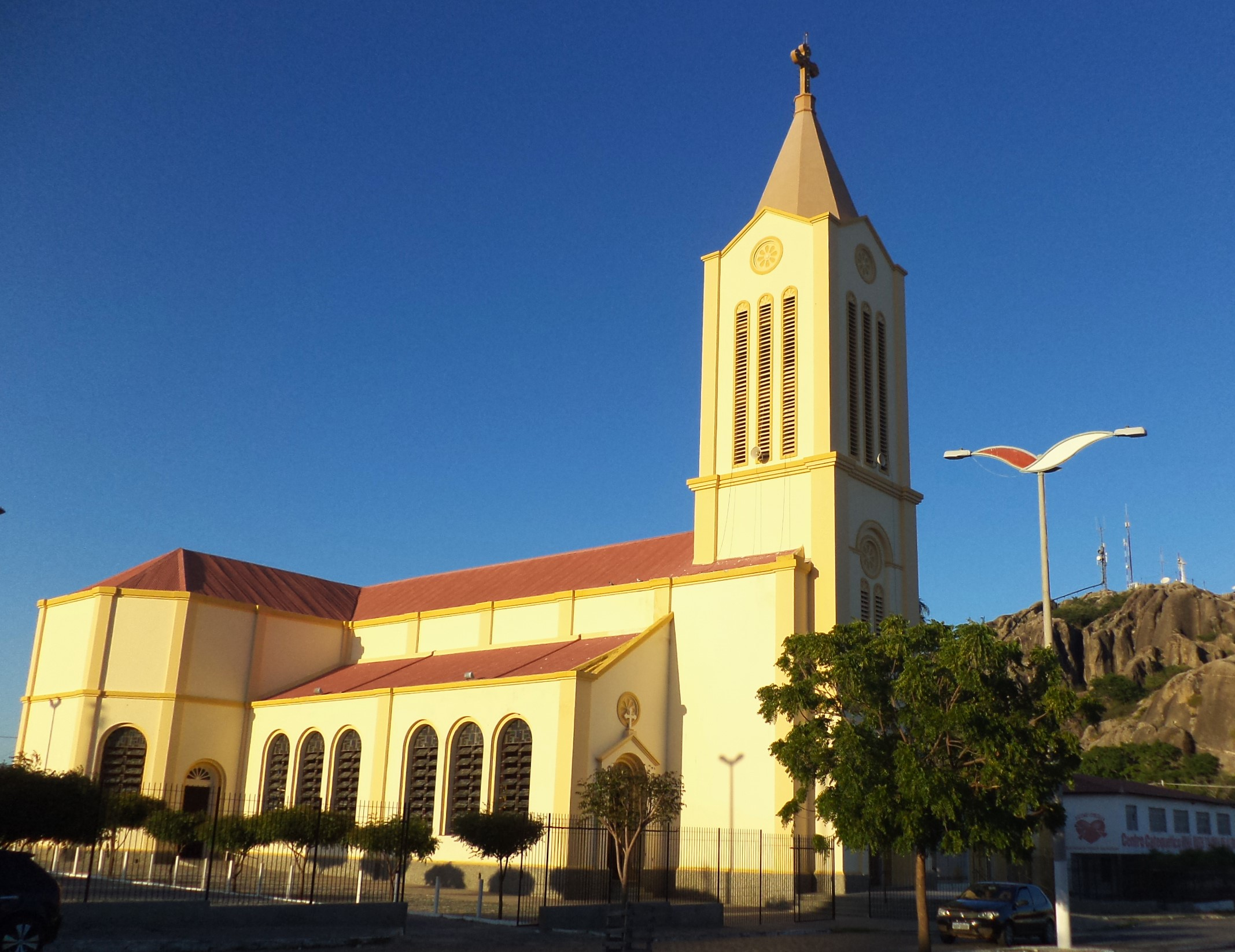
- Roman Catholic Diocese of Quixadá

Location
- Country: Brazil
- Ecclesiastical province: Fortaleza
- Metropolitan: Fortaleza
- Headquarters: Quixadá, Ceará, Brazil

Statistics
- Area: 13,874 km^{2} (5,357 sq mi)
- Population: Total; Catholics: (as of 2022); 352,000; 342,000 (97.2%)
- Parishes: 21

Information
- Denomination: Catholic Church
- Sui iuris church: Latin Church
- Rite: Roman Rite
- Established: 13 March 1971; 55 years ago
- Cathedral: Cathedral of the Holy family in Quixadá
- Patron saint: Holy Family

Current leadership
- Pope: Leo XIV
- Bishop: Aurélio Pinto de Sousa
- Metropolitan Archbishop: Gregório Leozírio Ben Lâmed da Paixão Neto, O.S.B.
- Bishops emeritus: Angelo Pignoli

Website
- www.diocesequixada.org

The Roman Catholic Diocese of Quixadá (Latin: Dioecesis Quixadensis) is a diocese located in the city of Quixadá in the ecclesiastical province of Fortaleza in Brazil.

== History ==
- 13 March 1971: Established as Diocese of Quixadá from the Metropolitan Archdiocese of Fortaleza

== Leadership ==
=== Bishops of Quixadá ===
- Joaquim Rufino do Rêgo (21 April 1971 – 25 March 1986), appointed Bishop of Parnaíba, Piauí
- Adelio Tomasin, P.S.D.P. (16 March 1988 – 3 January 2007), retired
- Angelo Pignoli (3 January 2007 – 15 December 2021), retired
- Aurélio Pinto de Sousa (10 May 2023 – Present)
