= José Antônio Aparecido Tosi Marques =

Brazilian former Archbishop of Fortaleza

His Excellency, The Most Reverend José Antônio Aparecido Tosi Marques
- Metropolitan Archbishop Emeritus of Fortaleza
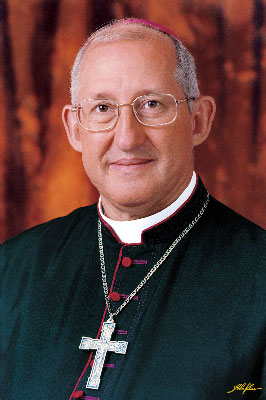
- Church: Roman Catholic Church
- Archdiocese: Fortaleza
- Metropolis: Fortaleza
- Appointed: 13 January 1999
- Term ended: 11 October 2023
- Predecessor: Cláudio Hummes
- Successor: Gregório Leozírio Ben Lâmed da Paixão Neto
- Previous posts: Auxiliary Bishop of São Salvador da Bahia (1991-99); Titular Bishop of Lisinia (1991-99)

Orders
- Ordination: 8 December 1974 by Constantino Amstalden
- Consecration: 20 September 1999 by Lucas Moreira Neves

Personal details
- Born: 13 May 1948 (age 78) Jaú, São Paulo, Brazil
- Motto: Fiat voluntas tua
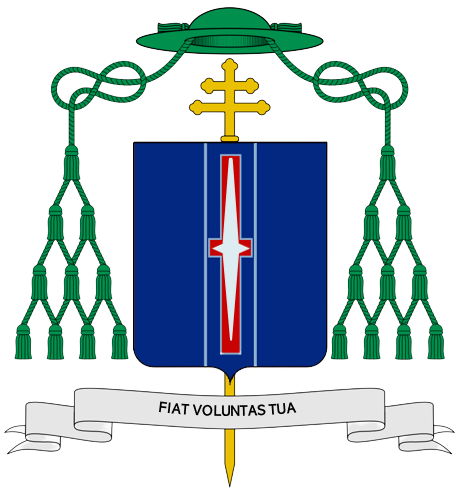
- Coat of arms

Styles of José Antônio Aparecido Tosi Marques
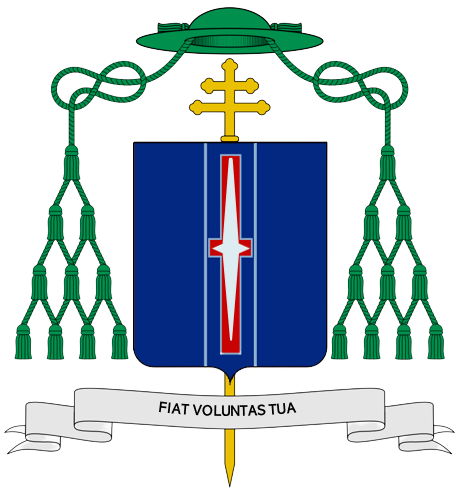
- Reference style: The Most Reverend
- Spoken style: Your Excellency
- Religious style: Monsignor

José Antônio Aparecido Tosi Marques (born 13 May 1948) is a Brazilian prelate of the Roman Catholic Church. He was the Archbishop of Fortaleza from 1999 to 2023.

== Biography ==
Born on 13 May 1948, the first of six brothers, he was ordained a priest in 1974.

He served as auxiliary bishop of the archdiocese of São Salvador da Bahia from 1991 to 1999.

Pope Francis accepted his resignation on 11 October 2023.

Catholic Church titles
Preceded by Murilo Sebastião Ramos Krieger	Titular Bishop of Lysinia; 1991–1999	Succeeded by Tadeusz Pikus
Preceded by Cláudio Hummes	Archbishop of Fortaleza; 1999–2023	Succeeded by Gregório Ben Lâmed Paixão
