= José Doth de Oliveira =

Brazilian Roman Catholic prelate

- Bishop of Iguatu
- Church: Catholic Church
- Diocese: Diocese of Iguatu
- In office: 26 July 2000 – 7 January 2009
- Predecessor: José Mauro Ramalho
- Successor: João José da Costa
- Previous posts: Coadjutor Bishop of Iguatu (1991-2000); Coadjutor Bishop of Palmares (1989-1991)

Orders
- Ordination: 13 December 1964
- Consecration: 13 May 1990 by José Mauro Ramalho

Personal details
- Born: 1 March 1938 Pedra Branca, Ceará, Republic of the United States of Brazil
- Died: 26 November 2017 (aged 79) Pedra Branca, Ceará, Brazil

José Doth de Oliveira (1 March 1938 – 26 November 2017) was a Brazilian Roman Catholic prelate.

Born in Pedra Branca, Ceará, Doth de Oliveira was ordained to the priesthood in 1964. He served as the Bishop of Iguatu from 2000 until he resigned in 2009. He died due to complications from Alzheimer's disease on 26 November 2017 in Pedra Branca, at the age of 79.
