= Diocese of Crateús =

Catholic ecclesiastical territory

Coordinates: 5.1744°S 40.6679°W

Diocese of Crateús Dioecesis Crateopolitana Diocese de Crateús

Catholic
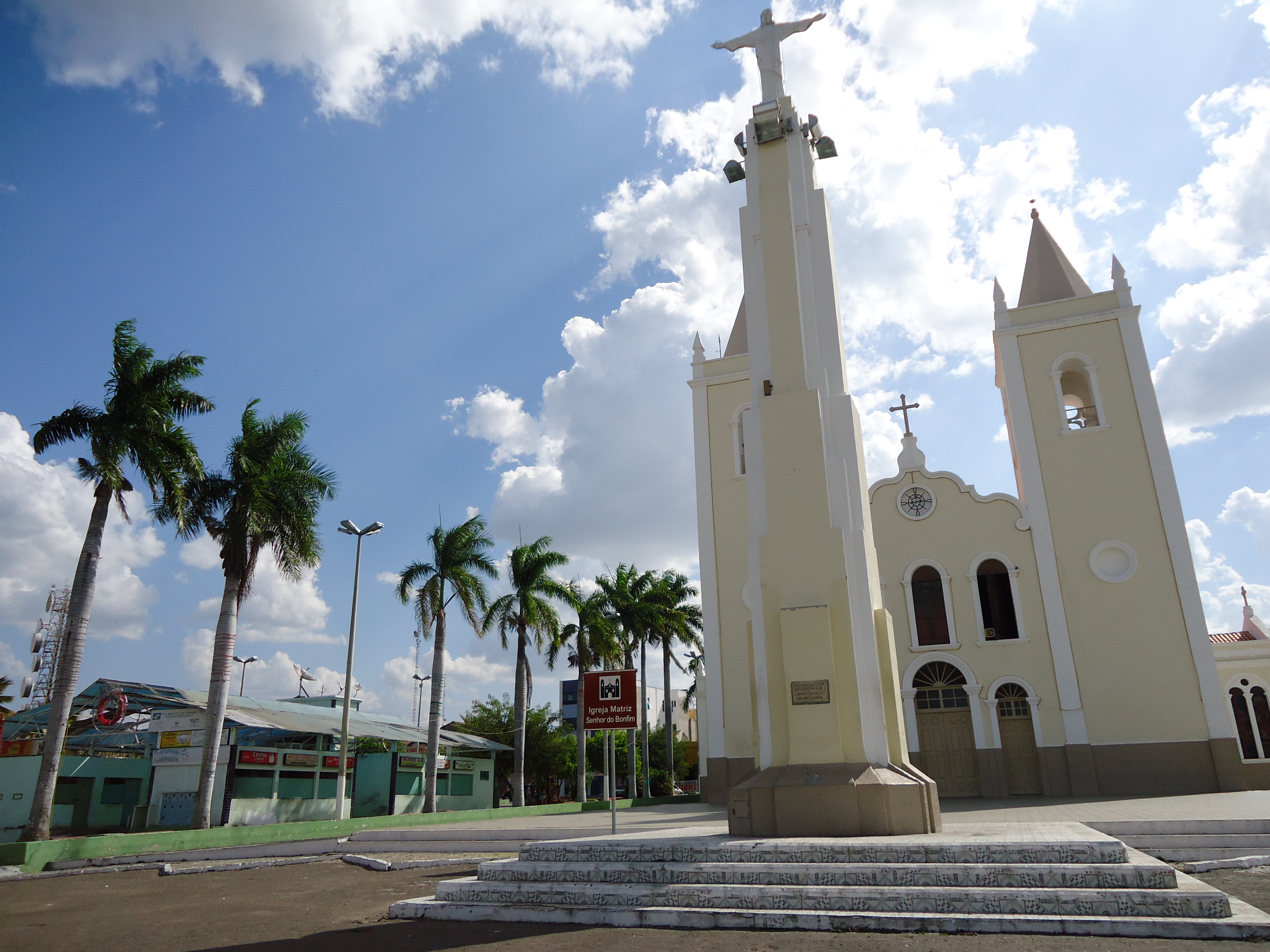
- Cathedral of Our Lord of the Good End in Crateús in 2010

- Coat of arms

Location
- Country: Brazil
- Ecclesiastical province: Fortaleza
- Metropolitan: Fortaleza

Statistics
- Area: 21,817 km^{2} (8,424 sq mi)
- Population: Total; Catholics: (as of 2006); 367,017; 336,317 (91.6%)

Information
- Rite: Latin Rite
- Established: 28 September 1963 (63 years ago)
- Cathedral: Cathedral of Our Lord of the Good End in Crateús

Current leadership
- Pope: Leo XIV
- Bishop: Ailton Menegussi
- Metropolitan Archbishop: José Antônio Aparecido Tosi Marques

Website
- Website of the Diocese

The Roman Catholic Diocese of Crateús (Latin: Dioecesis Crateopolitana) is a diocese located in the city of Crateús in the ecclesiastical province of Fortaleza in Brazil.

== History ==
- September 28, 1963: Established as Diocese of Crateús from the Diocese of Iguatu and Diocese of Sobral

== Leadership ==
- Bishops of Crateús (Roman rite)
  - Bishop Antônio Batista Fragoso (1964.04.28 – 1998.02.18)
  - Bishop Jacinto Furtado de Brito Sobrinho (1998.02.18 – 2012.02.22), appointed Archbishop of Teresina, Piaui
  - Bishop Ailton Menegussi (2013.11.06 − present)
