= Diocese of Tianguá =

Catholic ecclesiastical territory

Diocese of Tianguá Dioecesis Tianguensis Diocese de Tianguá

Catholic
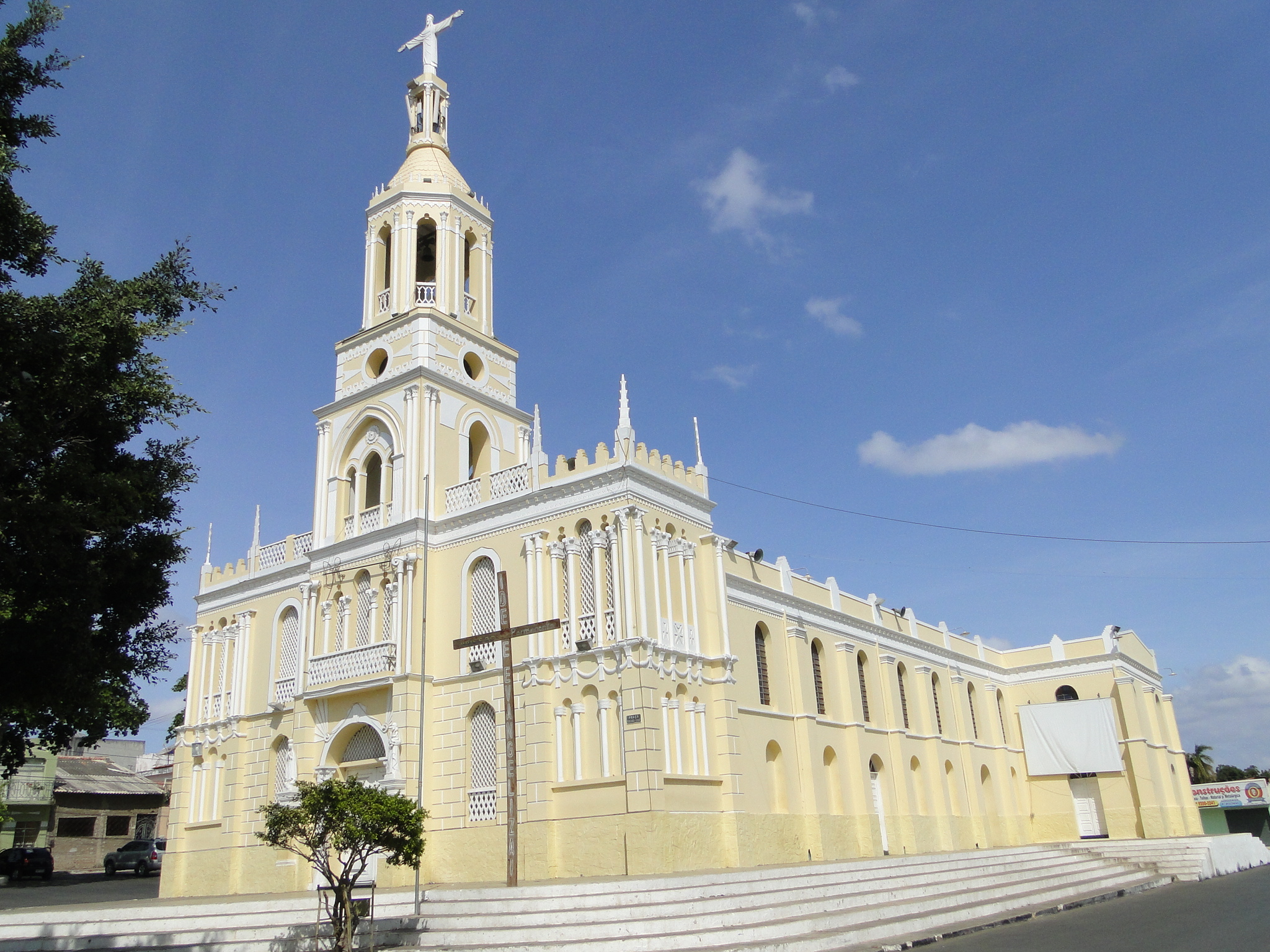
- Cathedral St Anne in Tianguá in 2012

Location
- Country: Brazil
- Ecclesiastical province: Fortaleza
- Metropolitan: Fortaleza
- Coordinates: 3°43′12″S 40°59′27″W

Statistics
- Area: 9,680 km^{2} (3,740 sq mi)
- Population: Total; Catholics: (as of 2010); 445,000; 409,000 (91.9%)

Information
- Rite: Latin Rite
- Established: March 13, 1971; 55 years ago
- Cathedral: Cathedral St Anne in Tianguá

Current leadership
- Pope: Leo XIV
- Bishop: Francisco Edimilson Neves Ferreira
- Metropolitan Archbishop: José Antônio Aparecido Tosi Marques
- Bishops emeritus: Francisco Javier Hernández Arnedo, O.A.R.

Website
- www.diocesedetiangua.org

The Roman Catholic Diocese of Tianguá (Latin: Dioecesis Tianguensis) is a diocese located in the city of Tianguá in the ecclesiastical province of Fortaleza in Brazil.

== History ==
- March 13, 1971: Established as Diocese of Tianguá from the Diocese of Sobral

== Leadership ==
- Bishops of Tianguá (Roman rite), in reverse chronological order
  - Bishop Francisco Edimilson Neves Ferreira (2017.02.15 - present)
  - Bishop Francisco Javier Hernández Arnedo, O.A.R. (1991.03.06 – 2017.02.15)
  - Bishop Timóteo Francisco Nemésio Pereira Cordeiro, O.F.M. Cap. (1971.03.13 – 1990.03.20)
