= Diocese of Iguatu =

Catholic ecclesiastical territory

Coordinates: 6.3592°S 39.2987°W

Diocese of Iguatuvinus Dioecesis Iguatuvinus Diocese de Iguatuvinus

Catholic
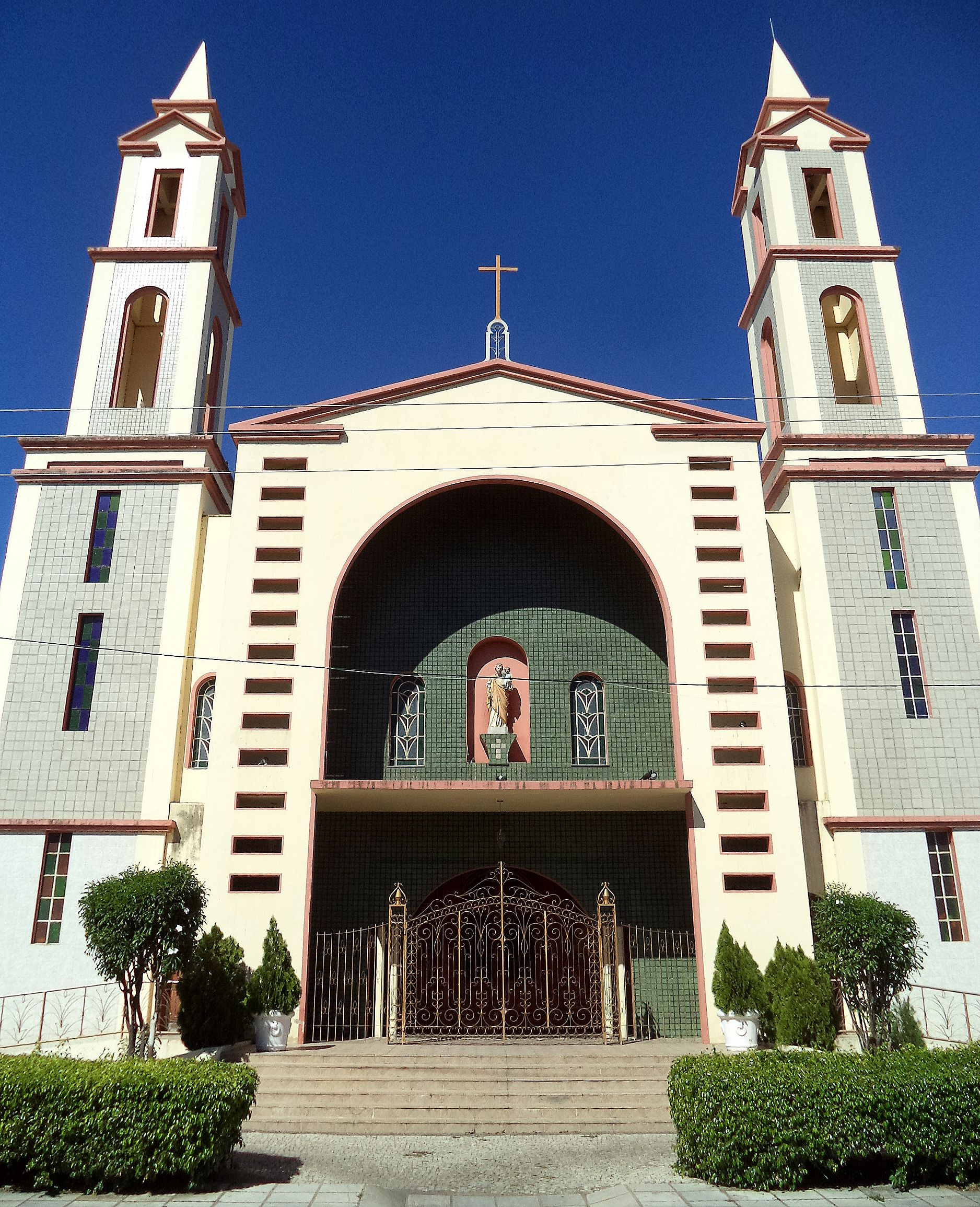

Location
- Country: Brazil
- Ecclesiastical province: Fortaleza
- Metropolitan: Fortaleza

Statistics
- Area: 21,904 km^{2} (8,457 sq mi)
- Population: Total; Catholics: (as of 2006); 525,000; 498,000 (94.9%)

Information
- Rite: Latin Rite
- Established: 28 January 1961 (65 years ago)
- Cathedral: Cathedral of St Anne in Iguatu

Current leadership
- Pope: Leo XIV
- Bishop: Geraldo Freire Soares, C.SS.R.
- Metropolitan Archbishop: José Antônio Aparecido Tosi Marques
- Bishops emeritus: Edson de Castro Homem

Website
- Website of the Diocese

The Roman Catholic Diocese of Iguatu (Latin: Dioecesis Iguatuvinus) is a diocese located in the city of Iguatu in the ecclesiastical province of Fortaleza in Brazil.

== History ==
- January 28, 1961: Established as Diocese of Iguatu from the Diocese of Crateús and Metropolitan Archdiocese of Fortaleza

== Bishops ==
- Bishop José Mauro Ramalho (1961.10.13 – 2000.07.26)
  - Bishop Coadjutor José Doth de Oliveira (1991–2000)
- Bishop José Doth de Oliveira (2000.07.26 – 2009.01.07)
- Bishop João José da Costa, O. Carm. (2009.01.07 – 2014.11.05)
- Bishop Edson de Castro Homem (2015.05.06 – 2021.02.24)
- Bishop Geraldo Freire Soares, C.SS.R. (2022.05.04 – ...)
