= Ariosto Holanda =

Brazilian politician (1938–2026)

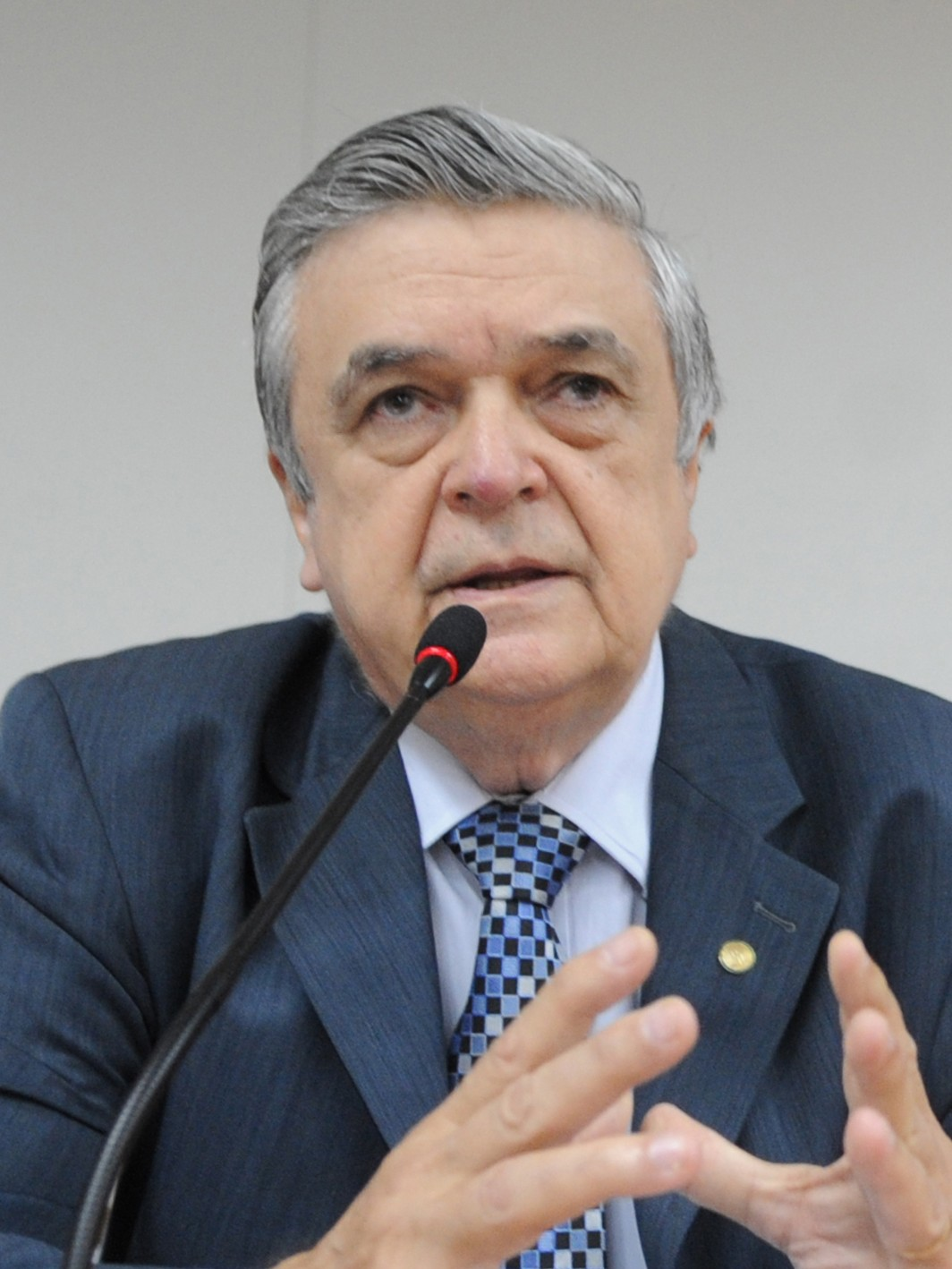
- Holanda in 2009

Member of the Chamber of Deputies of Brazil for Ceará
- In office 6 October 2015 – 21 March 2026
- In office 18 August 1995 – 31 January 2015
- In office 1 February 1991 – 31 January 1995

Personal details
- Born: Francisco Ariosto Holanda; 11 October 1938 Limoeiro do Norte, Ceará, Brazil
- Died: 21 March 2026 (aged 87) Fortaleza, Ceará, Brazil
- Party: PDT
- Education: Federal University of Ceará
- Occupation: Engineer

Francisco Ariosto Holanda (11 October 1938 – 21 March 2026) was a Brazilian politician and professor. A member of the Democratic Labour Party, he served in the Chamber of Deputies from 1991 to 1995, 1995 to 2015, and 2015 to 2026.

Holanda died in Fortaleza on 21 March 2026, at the age of 87.
