= Quixadá Airport =

Quixadá Regional Airport Aeroporto Regional de Quixadá
- IATA: QXD; ICAO: SNQX; LID: CE0010

Summary
- Airport type: Public
- Operator: Infraero (2023–2025); Visac Aeroportos (2025-present)
- Serves: Quixadá
- Time zone: BRT (UTC−03:00)
- Elevation AMSL: 225 m / 738 ft
- Coordinates: 04°58′44″S 038°59′16″W
- Website: www4.infraero.gov.br/aeroporto-quixada/

Map
- Location in Brazil

Runways
Direction	Length		Surface
Direction	m	ft	Surface
14/32	1,200	3,937	Asphalt

Statistics (2024)
- Passengers: 434
- Aircraft operations: 316
- Metric tonnes of cargo: 0
- Statistics: Infraero; Sources: airport website, ANAC, DECEA

Quixadá Regional Airport (IATA: QXD, ICAO: SNQX), is the airport serving Quixadá, Brazil.

It is managed by contract by Visac Aeroportos.

== History ==
Previously operated by Infraero, on April 22, 2025 the State of Ceará signed a one-year contract of operation with Visac Aeroportos.

== Airlines and destinations ==
No scheduled flights operate at this airport.

== Access ==
The airport is located 4 km (2 mi) from downtown Quixadá.

== See also ==
- List of airports in Brazil
