= Diocese of Limoeiro do Norte =

Catholic ecclesiastical territory

Diocese of Limoeiro do Norte Dioecesis Limoëirensis Diocese de Limoeiro do Norte

Catholic
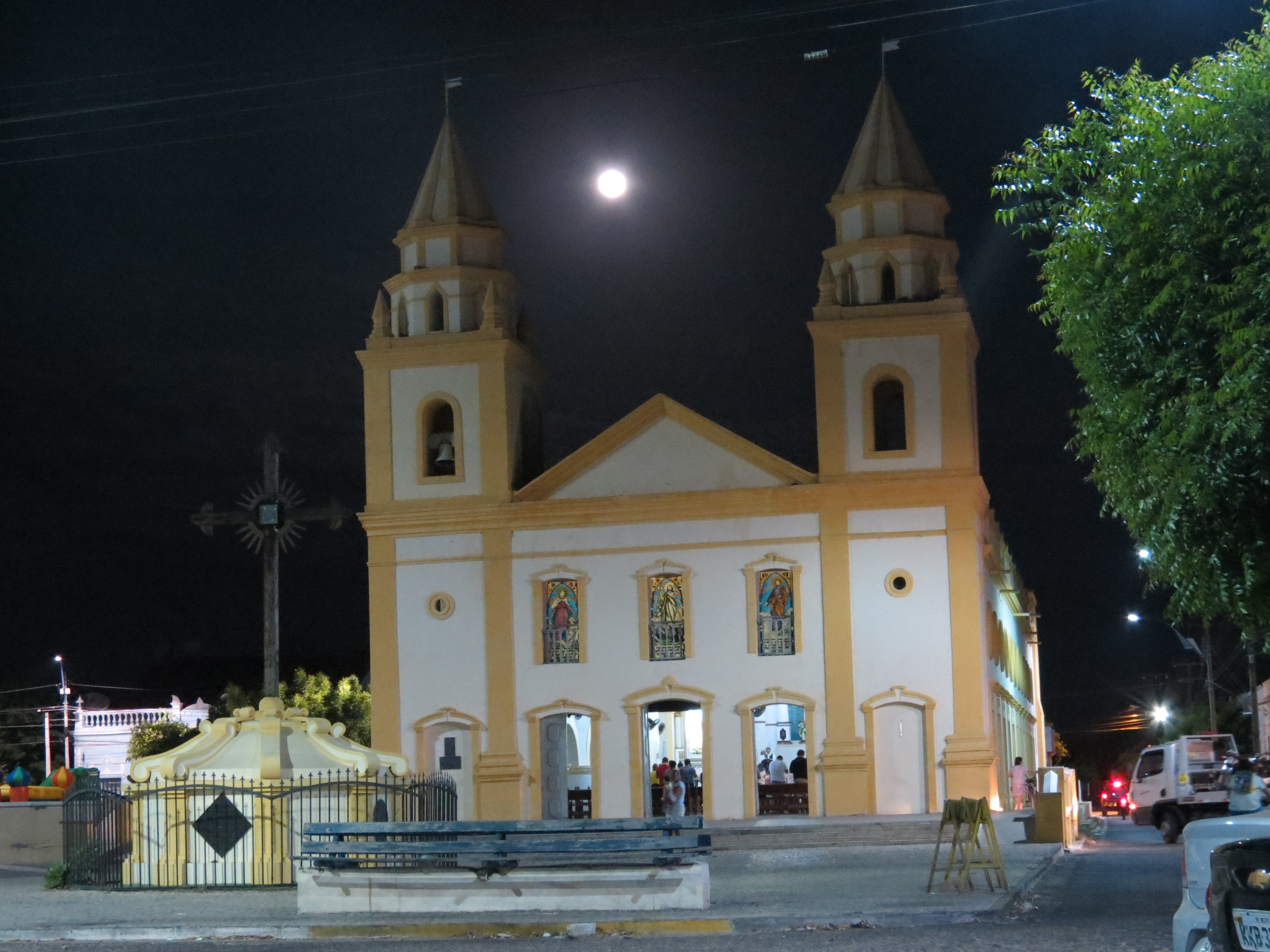
- Cathedral of the Immaculate Conception in Limoeiro do Norte

Location
- Country: Brazil
- Ecclesiastical province: Fortaleza
- Metropolitan: Fortaleza

Statistics
- Area: 18,316 km^{2} (7,072 sq mi)
- Population: Total; Catholics: (as of 2004); 484,111; 435,699 (90.0%)

Information
- Rite: Latin Rite
- Established: 7 May 1938 (88 years ago)
- Cathedral: Cathedral of the Immaculate Conception in Limoeiro do Norte

Current leadership
- Pope: Leo XIV
- Bishop: André Vital Félix da Silva, S.C.I.
- Metropolitan Archbishop: Gregório Ben Lâmed Paixão
- Bishops emeritus: Manuel Edmilson da Cruz

The Roman Catholic Diocese of Limoeiro do Norte (Latin: Dioecesis Limoëirensis) is a Latin Rite suffragan diocese in the ecclesiastical province of Fortaleza, both in Ceará state, northeast Brazil.

Its cathedral episcopal see is Catedral Nossa Senhora da Conceiçao, dedicated to Immaculate Conception, in the city of Limoeiro do Norte.

== History ==
- Established on 7 May 1938 as Diocese of Limoeiro do Norte by Pius XI's papal bulla Ad dominicum cuiusvis, on territory split off from its Metropolitan, the Archdiocese of Fortaleza.

== Statistics ==
As per 2014, it pastorally served 489,000 Catholics (90.4% of 541,000 total) on 18,440 km^{2} in 25 parishes and 1 mission with 41 priests (28 diocesan, 13 religious), 73 lay religious (18 brothers, 55 sisters) and 9 seminarians.

== Bishops ==
(all Roman rite)

=== Episcopal ordinaries ===
Suffragan Bishops of Limoeiro do Norte

- Aureliano de Matos (1940.01.30 – death 1967.08.19), no previous prelature
- José Freire Falcão (1967.08.19 – 1971.11.25), succeeding as previous Titular Bishop of Vardimissa (1967.04.24 – 1967.08.19) as Coadjutor Bishop of Limoeiro do Norte (1967.04.24 – 1967.08.19); later Metropolitan Archbishop of Teresina (Brazil) (1971.11.25 – 1984.02.15), Metropolitan Archbishop of Brasília (Brazil) (1984.02.15 – 2004.01.28), Second Vice-President of Latin American Episcopal Council (1987 – 1991), created Cardinal-Priest of S. Luca a Via Prenestina (1988.06.28 – ...)
- Pompeu Bezerra Bessa (1973.01.25 – death 1994.05.18), died 2000
- Manuel Edmilson da Cruz (1994.05.18 – retired 1998.05.06), previously Titular Bishop of Vicus Cæsaris (1966.08.08 – 1994.05.18) as Auxiliary Bishop of Archdiocese of São Luís do Maranhão (Brazil) (1966.08.08 – 1974.07.03) and as Auxiliary Bishop of Archdiocese of Fortaleza (Brazil) (1974.07.03 – 1994.05.18), also Apostolic Administrator sede plena of Limoeiro do Norte (1992 – 1994.05.18)
- José Haring, O.F.M. (2000.01.19 – retired 2017.05.10)
- André Vital Félix da Silva, Dehonians (S.C.I.) (2017.05.10 – ...).

=== Coadjutor bishop ===
- José Freire Falcão (1967); future Cardinal

=== Other priest of this diocese who became bishop ===
- José Mauro Ramalho de Alarcón Santiago, appointed Bishop of Iguatú, Ceara in 1961

== See also ==
- List of Catholic dioceses in Brazil

== Sources and external links ==
- GCatholic.org, with Google satellite photo - data for all sections
- Catholic Hierarchy
