= Geraldo Nascimento =

Brazilian Roman Catholic prelate (1936–2022)

His Excellency Geraldo Nascimento
- Auxiliary Bishop Emeritus of Fortaleza
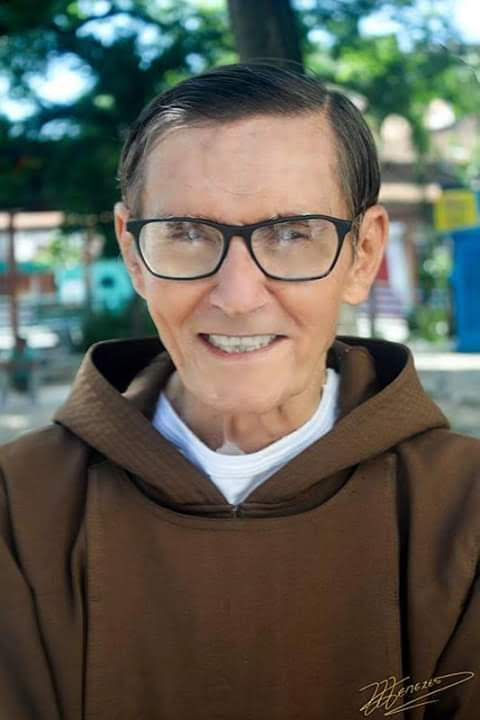
- Appointed: 10 September 1982
- Term ended: 22 January 1997
- Other post: Titular Bishop of Zama Major (1982–2022)

Orders
- Ordination: 29 June 1967
- Consecration: 22 December 1982 by Aloísio Leo Arlindo Lorscheider

Personal details
- Born: 18 May 1936 Senador Pompeu, Ceará, Brazil
- Died: 6 November 2022 (aged 86) Juazeiro do Norte, Ceará, Brazil

Geraldo Nascimento (18 May 1936 – 6 November 2022) was a Brazilian Capuchin and bishop of the Roman Catholic Church.

== Life ==
After studying at the Salesian College in Baturité and at the Marist College of Ceará in Fortaleza, Geraldo Nascimento entered the Capuchin order as a postulant. In 1959, he began his novitiate in Guaramiranga, where he made his first vows on 28 December, 1960. He was ordained a priest on 29 June, 1967 by José Medeiros Delgado, Archbishop of Fortaleza, and then completed further studies in theology and philosophy, becoming director and teacher in 1968.

On 10 September, 1982, Pope John Paul II appointed him Auxiliary bishop of Fortaleza and Titular bishop of Zama Major. The Archbishop of Fortaleza, Cardinal Aloísio Lorscheider OFM, consecrated Nascimento on December 22 of the same year; Co-consecrators were Manuel Edmilson da Cruz, Auxiliary Bishop of Fortaleza, and Timóteo Francisco Nemésio Pereira Cordeiro OFMCap, Bishop of Tianguá.

Pope Benedict XVI accepted Nascimento's retirement on January 22, 1997, at the age of 60 for health reasons. Since 2016 he has been a member of the Capuchin convent of Juazeiro do Norte and has served as confessor at the Sanctuary of São Francisco das Chagas. He died on November 6, 2022, in Juazeiro do Norte at the age of 86.

Catholic Church titles
Preceded by —	Auxiliary Bishop of Fortaleza; 1982–1997	Succeeded by —
Preceded by Eliseu Maria Coroli	Titular Bishop of Zama Major; 1982–2022	Succeeded by Giuse Vũ Công Viện
