= Ailton Menegussi =

Brazilian Roman Catholic bishop (born 1962)

- Bishop of Crateús
- Church: Catholic Church
- Diocese: Diocese of Crateús
- Appointed: 6 November 2013
- Predecessor: Jacinto Furtado de Brito Sobrinho

Orders
- Ordination: 22 November 1998
- Consecration: 21 December 2013 by Zanoni Demettino Castro

Personal details
- Born: 5 November 1962 (age 64) Nova Venécia, Espírito Santo, United States of Brzail

Ailton Menegussi (born 5 November 1962) is a Brazilian Roman Catholic bishop.

Ordained to the priesthood on 22 November 1998, Menegussi was named bishop of the Roman Catholic Diocese of Crateús on 6 November 2013.
