= Quixadá Monoliths Natural Monument =

- Monumento Natural dos Monólitos de Quixadá
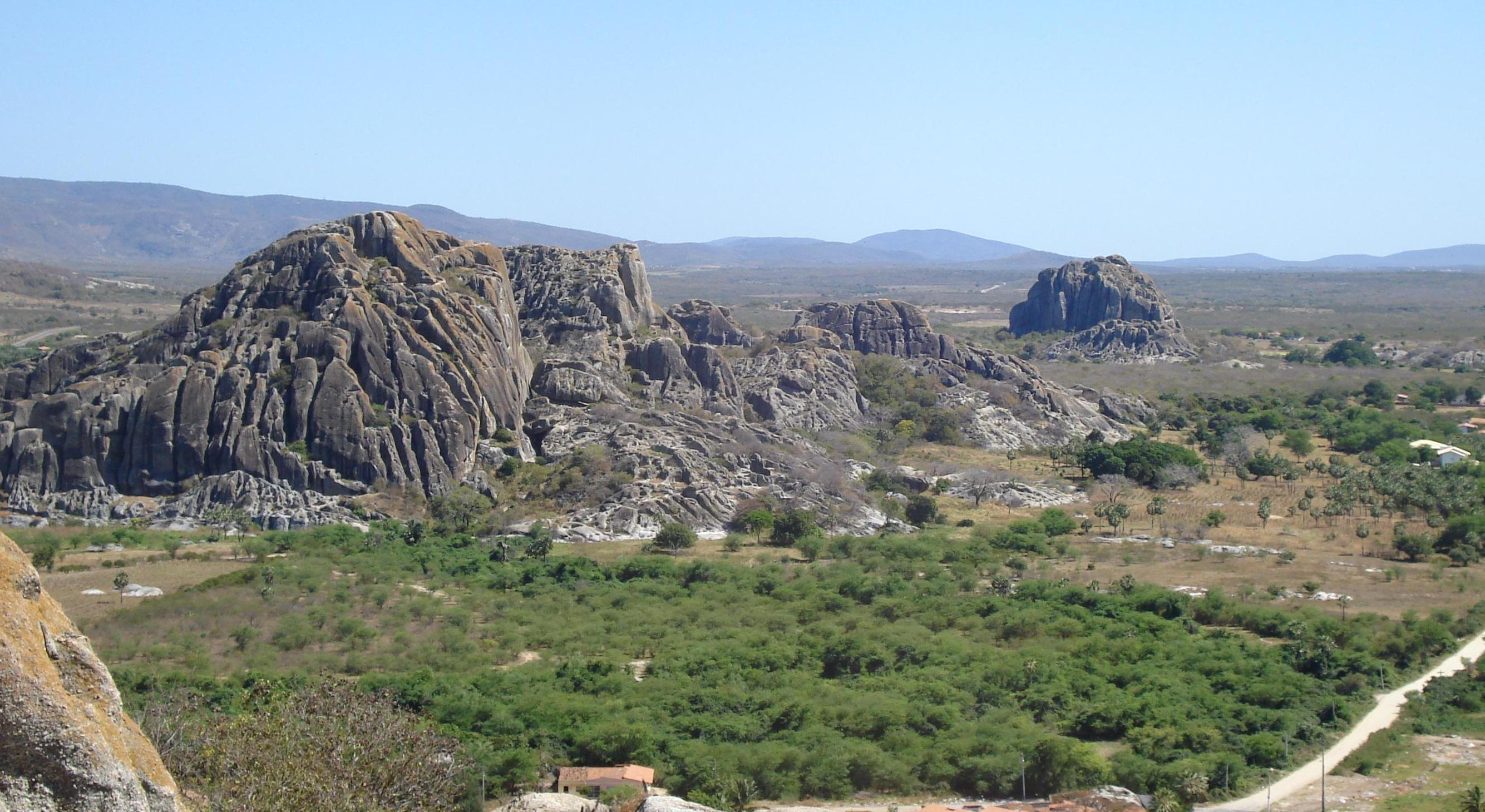
- Monoliths on the outskirts of Quixadá

- Location within Brazil
- Nearest city: Quixadá, Ceará
- Coordinates: 4°58′S 39°00′W
- Area: 16,635 hectares (41,110 acres)
- Designation: Natural monument
- Created: 25 October 2002
- Administrator: Semace

The Quixadá Monoliths Natural Monument (Portuguese: Monumento Natural dos Monólitos de Quixadá) is a formation of inselbergs in the state of Ceará, Brazil, that has been designated a natural monument.

== Location ==
The Quixadá Monoliths Natural Monument in the municipality of Quixadá is a fully protected conservation unit created through Ceará state decree 26805 of 25 October 2002. The natural monument was established to protect the rare and scenic inselbergs in the region, which have great ecological and tourist interest, and to protect the fragile ecology of the central Sertão against the risk of human intervention. It covers an area of 16,635 hectares (41,110 acres).

The inselbergs lie in the dry Caatinga biome. They are residual formations remaining after erosion in the semi-arid environment. There are cave paintings and other archaeological remains on the site that date to prehistoric times. The Barragem do Cedro (Cedar Dam) was built between 1890 and 1906 using stone masonry, cement and steel, at the foot of the Pedra da Galinha Choca (Brooding Hen Rock), the most famous of the monoliths. On 30 January 2015 the dam was placed on the tentative list as a UNESCO World Heritage Site.

== Conservation ==
The Quixadá Monoliths Natural Monument is classed as IUCN protected area categories III (natural monument or feature). The unit is administered by Superintendência Estadual do Meio Ambiente Ceará (Semace), the state environmental agency. The area is already partly under the legal responsibility of the National Institute of Historic and Artistic Heritage (IPHAN: Instituto do Patrimônio Histórico e Artístico Nacional), since it holds little-explored archaeological sites, so its status is under review.

It is prohibited to remove, dismantle or deface the rock formations, or to deploy equipment in the natural structures. Civil works, earthworks and opening and maintaining roads are prohibited if they would cause substantial ecological changes. The unit is vulnerable to human activities such as deforestation, burning and mining.

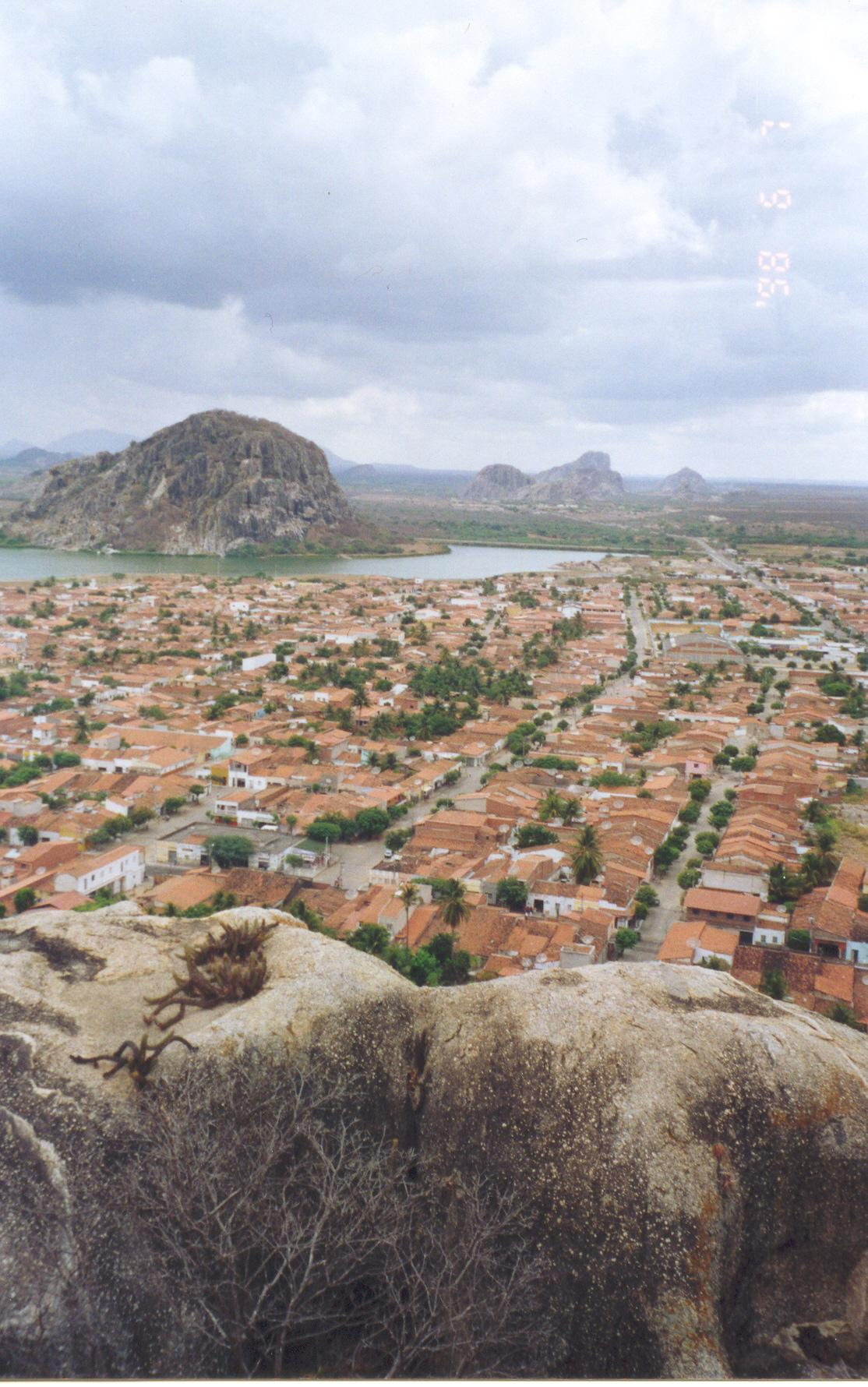
Town and inselbergs

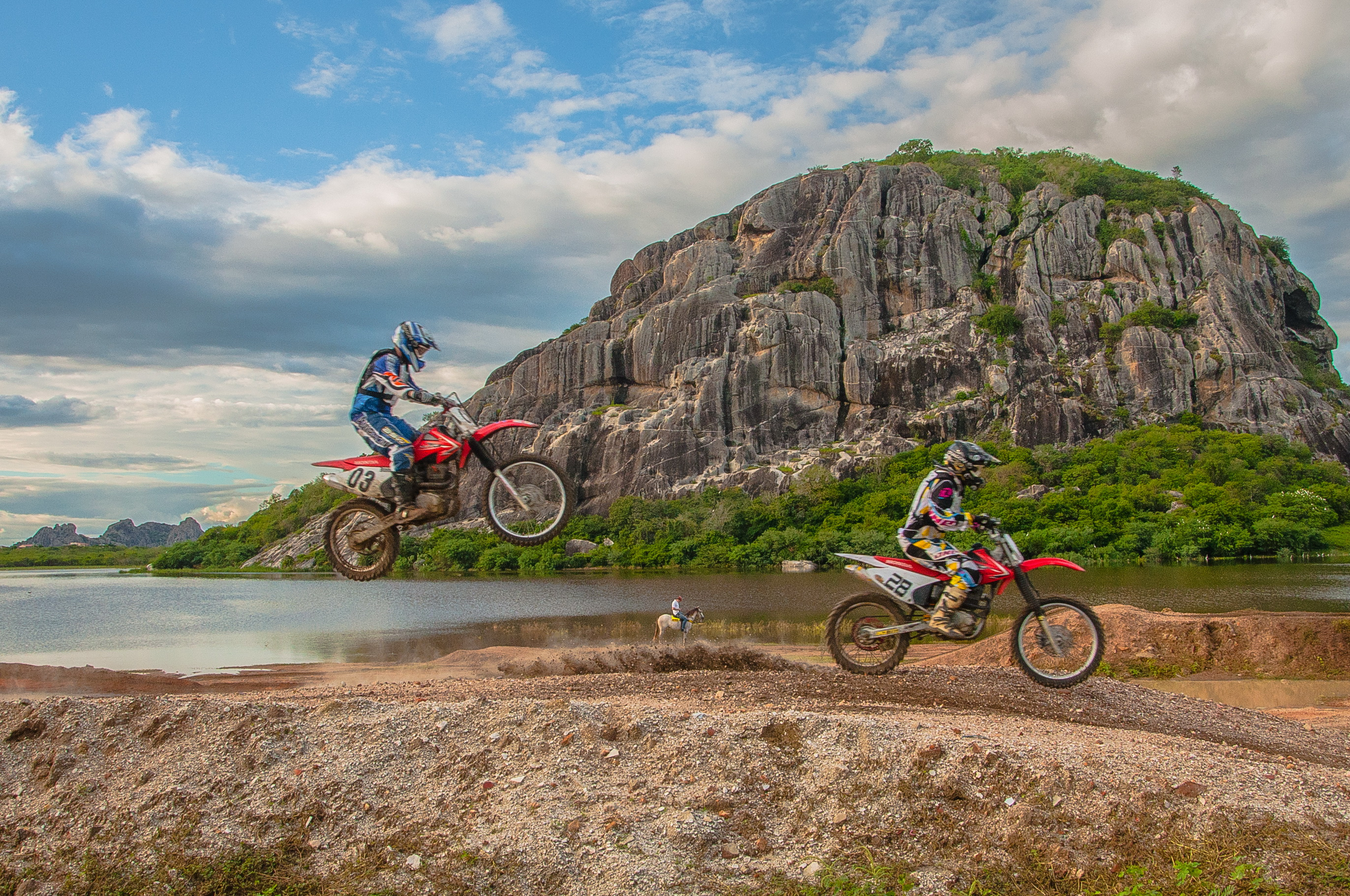
Bike riders beside monolith

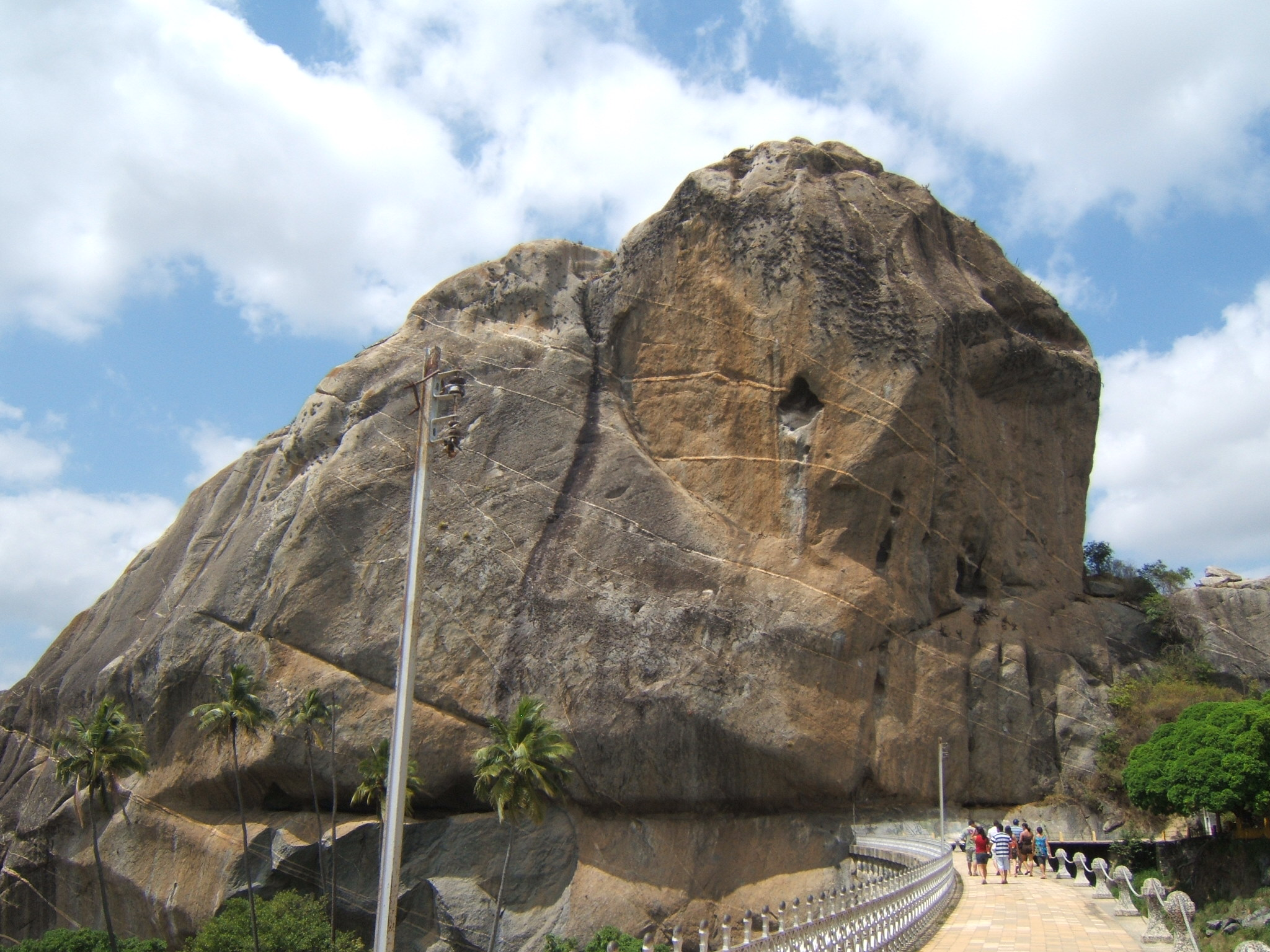
Dam's Rock

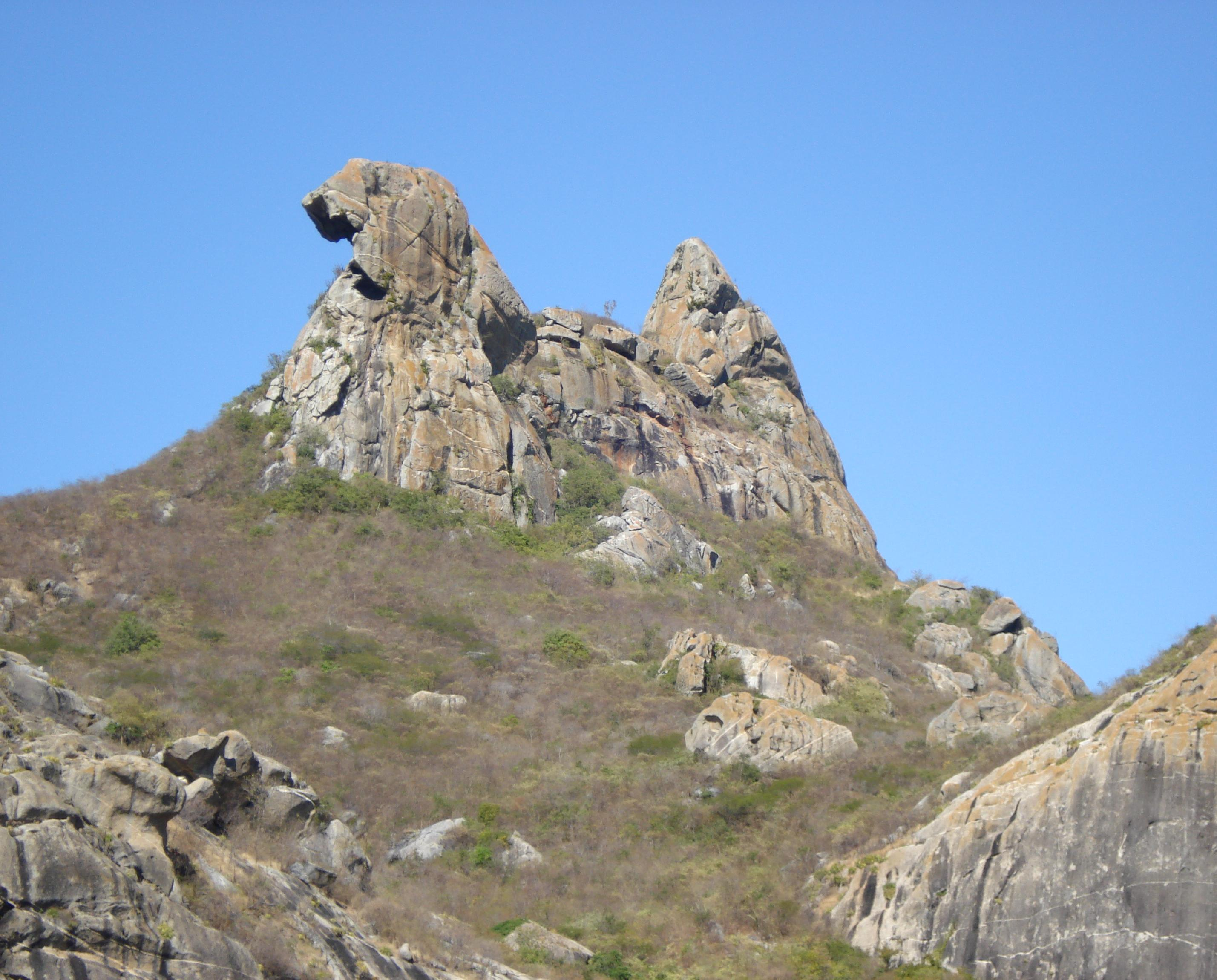
Pedra Galinha Choca

== Sources ==
- Cedro Dam in the Quixadá Monoliths, UNESCO
- MN Monólitos de Quixadá (in Portuguese), WWF, archived from the original on 2016-06-16
- Monumento Natural Monólitos de Quixadá (in Portuguese), Semace
