= Pedra da Galinha Choca =

Mountain in Brazil

Coordinates: 4°59′11″S 39°04′17″W

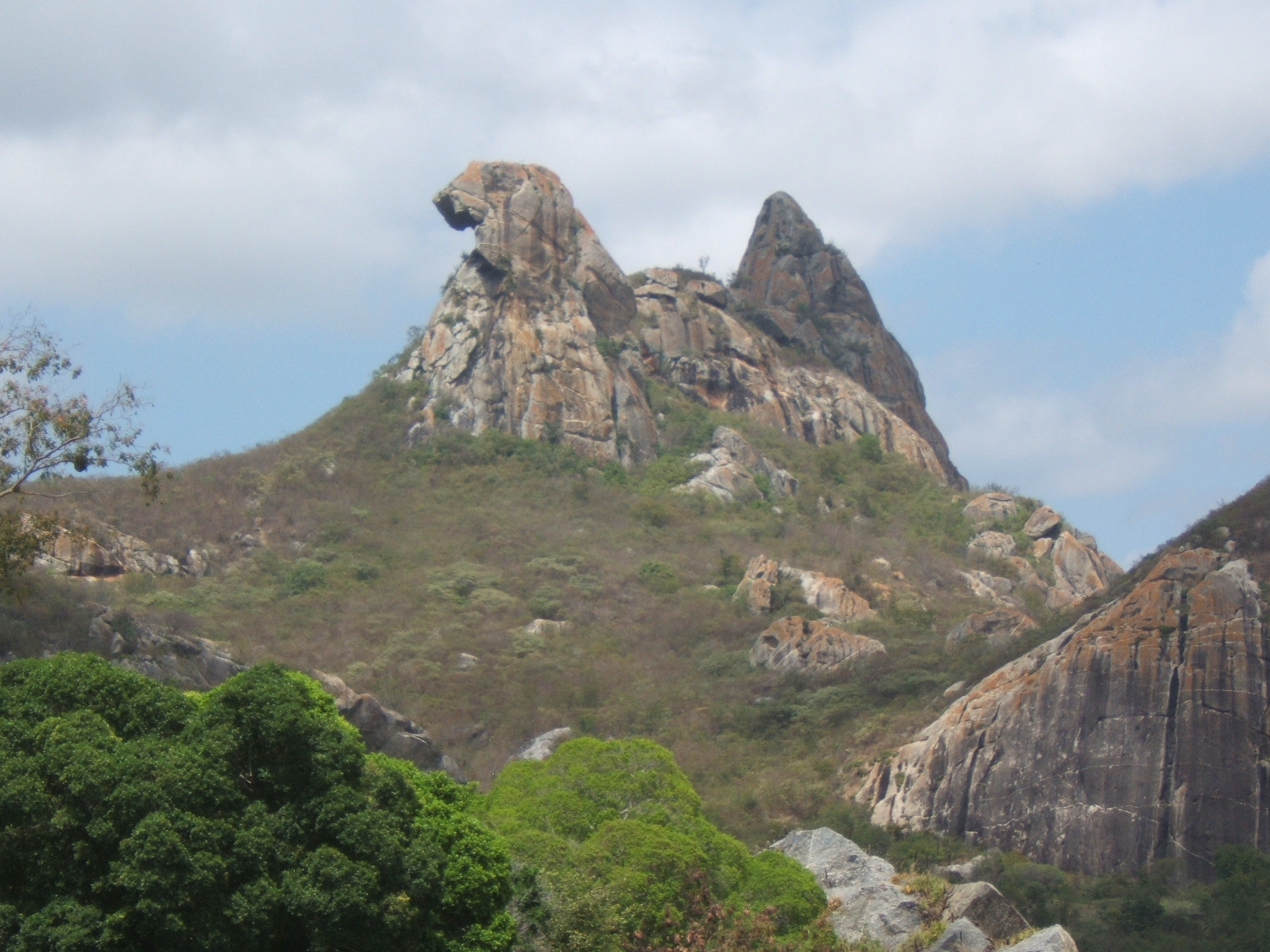
The Pedra da Galinha Choca is a major tourist destination of Quixadá. Photo of the stone in the dry season.

Pedra da Galinha Choca (Rock of the Brooding Hen) is a rock formation in the Brazilian city of Quixadá in Ceará, taking its name from its curious shape. It is located 5 km from the city center. The formation is in the Quixadá Monoliths Natural Monument, a fully protected area.

Until the early twentieth century was called the Pedra da Arara (Macaw's Stone). It consists of inselberg diorites and granites, which are igneous rocks, i.e., formed from cooling magma. Like other monoliths of the region, the Pedra da Galinha Choca is on a crystalline ground, i.e., consists of ancient and tough rocks that were formed during the Precambrian, and which with erosion eventually stood above the surface.

The Barragem do Cedro (Cedar Dam) was built between 1890 and 1906 using stone masonry, cement and steel, at the foot of the Pedra da Galinha Choca. On 30 January 2015 the dam was placed on the tentative list as a UNESCO World Heritage Site.
