= Manuel Edmilson da Cruz =

Brazilian Catholic bishop (born 1924)

His Excellency Manuel Edmilson da Cruz
- Bishop Emeritus of Limoeiro do Norte
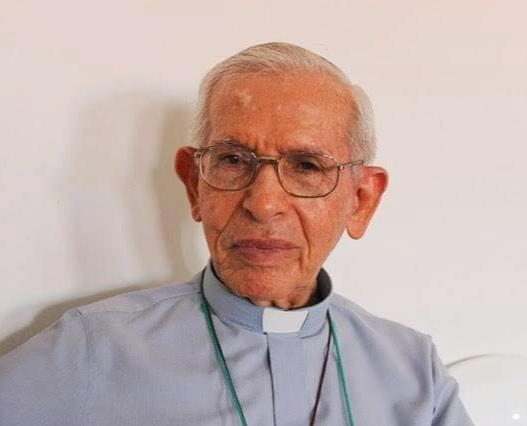
- Manuel Edmilson da Cruz in 2023
- Metropolis: Fortaleza
- Diocese: Limoeiro do Norte
- Appointed: 22 May 1992 (as Apostolic Administrator); 18 May 1994 (as Diocesan Bishop)
- Term ended: 6 May 1998
- Predecessor: Pompeu Bezerra Bessa
- Successor: José Haring
- Previous posts: Titular Bishop of Vicus Caesaris (1966–1994), Auxuliary Bishop of São Luís do Maranhão (1966–1974), Auxuliary Bishop of Fortaleza (1974–1994)

Orders
- Ordination: 5 December 1948 by José Tupinambá da Frota
- Consecration: 6 November 1966 by João José da Mota e Albuquerque

Personal details
- Born: 3 October 1924 (age 101) Acaraú, Brazil
- Motto: Verbum caro factum

Manuel Edmilson da Cruz (born 3 October 1924) is a Brazilian Roman Catholic prelate, who served as Titular Bishop of Vicus Cæsaris (8 August 1966 — 18 May 1994), Auxiliary Bishop of Archdiocese of São Luís do Maranhão (8 August 1966 – 3 July 1974), Auxiliary Bishop of Archdiocese of Fortaleza (3 July 1974 – 18 May 1994), Apostolic Administrator sede plena of Limoeiro do Norte (22 May 1992 – 18 May 1994) and the Diocesan Bishop of Limoeiro do Norte (18 May 1994 – 6 May 1998).

== Biography ==
Manuel Edmilson da Cruz was born in Acaraú in Brazil and was ordained priest in Sobral on 5 December 1948 for the Diocese of Sobral.

Pope Paul VI appointed him an auxiliary bishop of São Luís do Maranhão and at the same time titular bishop of Vicus Caesaris on 8 August 1966 and received the episcopal consecration on 6 November of the same year from archbishop of São Luís do Maranhão, João José da Mota e Albuquerque as a principal consecrator, and a co-consecrators Walfrido Teixeira Vieira, bishop of Sobral and José Mauro Ramalho de Alarcón Santiago, bishop of Iguatu.

On 3 July 1974, he was transferred as an auxiliary bishop of Archdiocese of Fortaleza and later, on 18 May 1994 he was appointed by Pope John Paul II as a diocesan bishop to the residential see of Limoeiro do Norte and on 6 May 1998 he renounced the pastoral governance of the diocese.
