= Limoeiro do Norte =

Municipality in Ceará, Brazil

Coordinates: 5°08′S 38°05′W

- Municipality
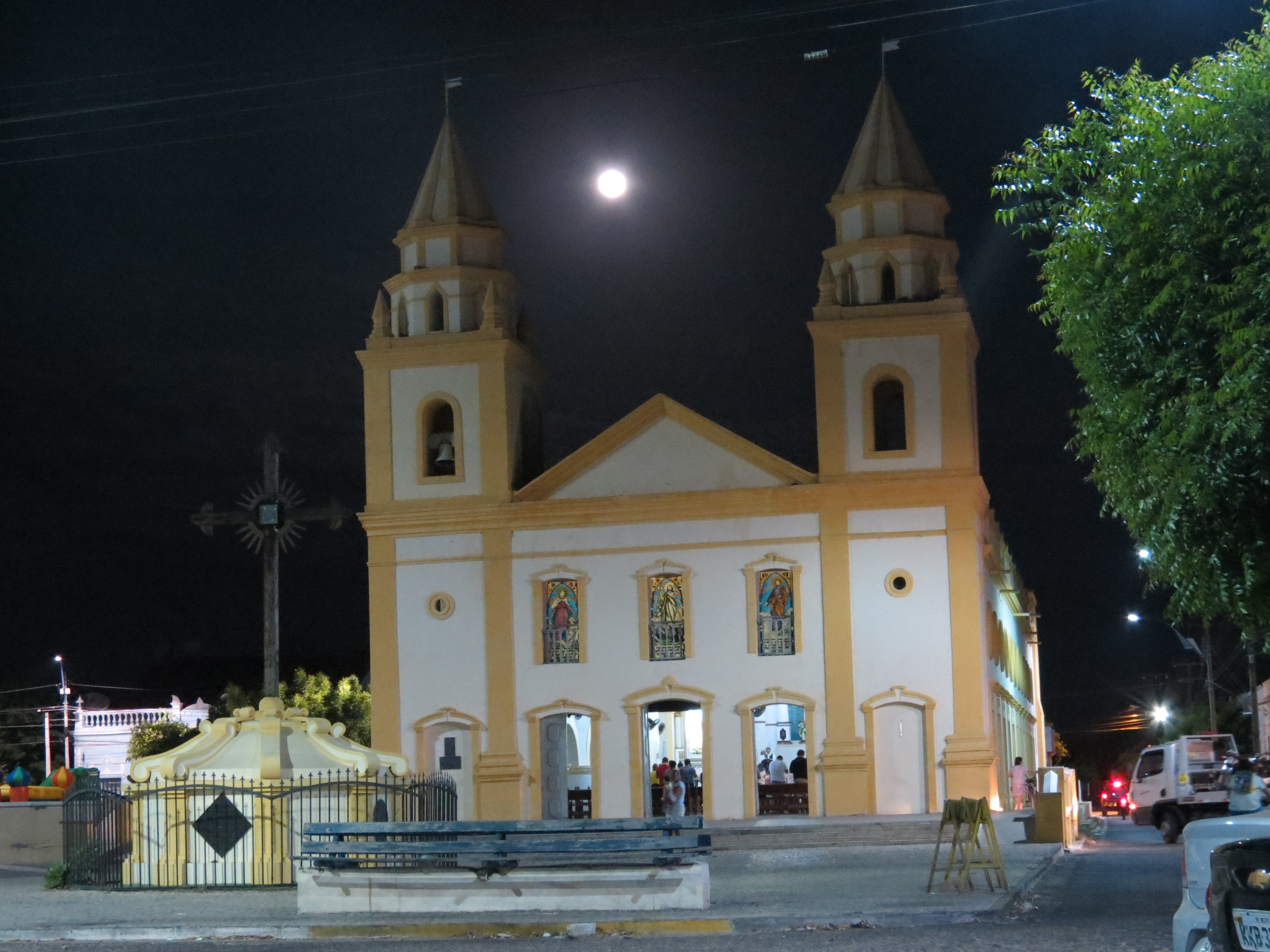

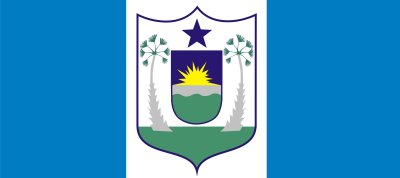
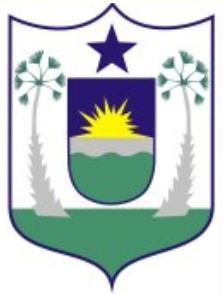
- Flag Coat of arms
- Interactive map of Limoeiro do Norte
- Country: Brazil
- Region: Nordeste
- State: Ceará
- Mesoregion: Jaguaribe

Population (2020)
  - Total: 59,890
- Time zone: UTC−3 (BRT)

Limoeiro do Norte is a municipality in the state of Ceará in the Northeast region of Brazil.

== Notable residents ==
- Márcia Mendonça (1949–1998), artist.
- Ariosto Holanda (1938-2026), professor and politician.

== See also ==
- List of municipalities in Ceará
