= Joaquim Rufino do Rêgo =

- Bishop of Parnaíba
- Church: Catholic Church
- Diocese: Diocese of Parnaíba
- In office: 25 March 1986 – 21 February 2001
- Predecessor: Edvaldo Gonçalves Amaral
- Successor: Alfredo Schäffler
- Previous post: Bishop of Quixadá (1971-1986)

Orders
- Ordination: 5 October 1952
- Consecration: 4 July 1971 by Umberto Mozzoni

Personal details
- Born: 14 January 1926 Picos, Piauí, Republic of the United States of Brazil
- Died: 10 August 2013 (aged 87)

Joaquim Rufino do Rêgo (14 January 1926 – 10 August 2013) was a Roman Catholic bishop.

Ordained in 1952, Rufino do Rêgo was named bishop in 1971 and in 1986 became bishop of the Diocese of Parnaiba, Brazil. He retired in 2001.
