= Quixadá =

Municipality in Ceará, Brazil

- Municipality
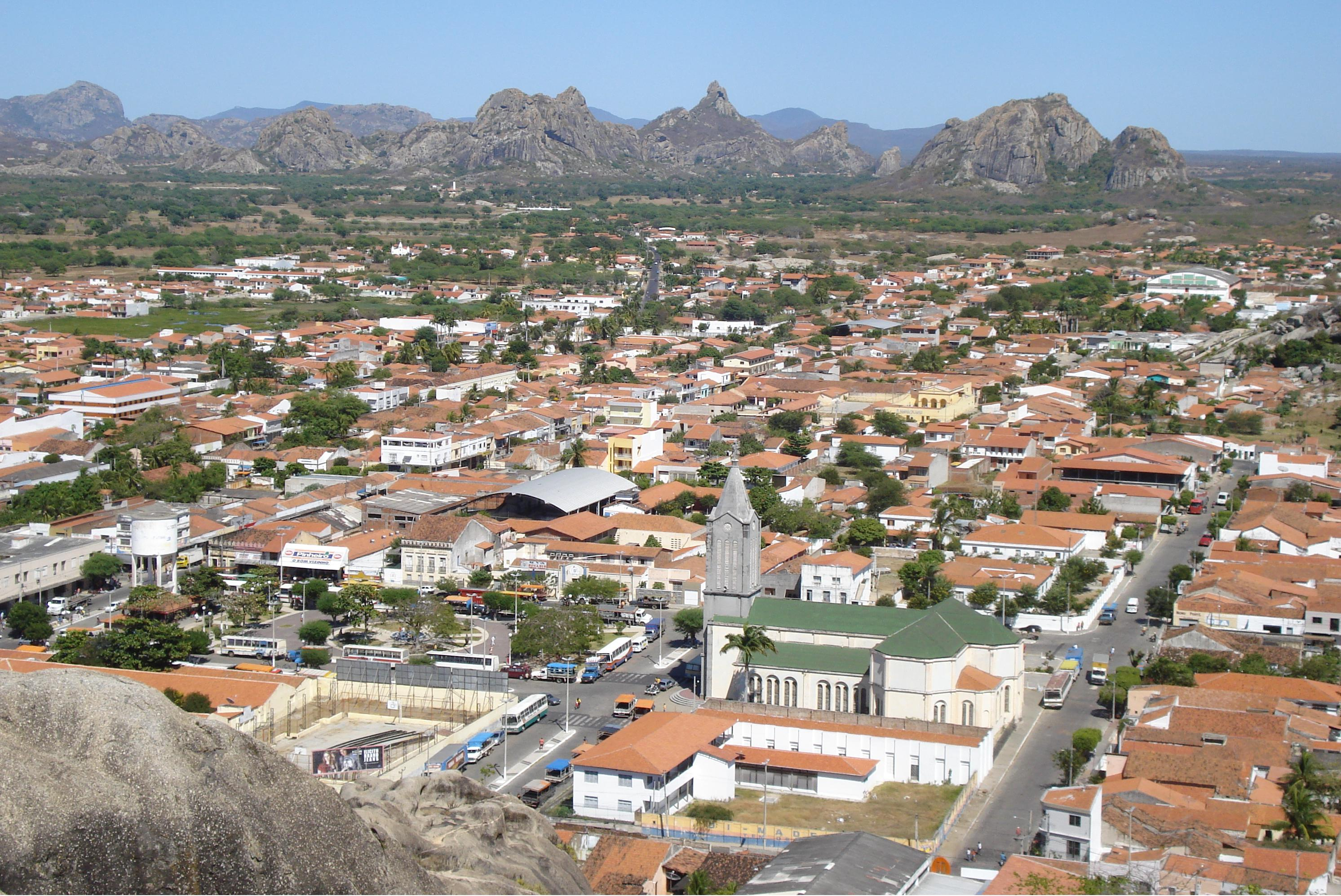
- View of Quixadá

- Flag Coat of arms

- Location within Brazil
- Coordinates: 4.969°S 39.013°W
- Country: Brazil
- State: Ceará

Population (2020)
  - Total: 88,321
- Time zone: UTC−3 (BRT)

Quixadá (Brazilian Portuguese pronunciation: [kiʃaˈda]) is a municipality in the state of Ceará in Brazil. It is known for its unusual rock formations, known locally as monoliths.

== Location ==
Quixadá is located at around 4°58′15″S 39°0′54″W. It was founded in 1870 and had a population of 80,605 residents in 2010, according to the Brazilian census. It is the seat of the Roman Catholic Diocese of Quixadá.

Pre-historic cave paintings and other archaeological remains have been found in the vicinity. The municipality contains the 16,635 hectares (41,110 acres) Quixadá Monoliths Natural Monument, a fully protected area around and containing the highly unusual inselbergs known locally as monoliths, which are of considerable tourist interest. The Barragem do Cedro (Cedar Dam) was built between 1890 and 1906 using stone masonry, cement and steel, at the foot of the Pedra da Galinha Choca (Brooding Hen Rock), the most famous of the monoliths. On 30 January 2015 the dam was placed on the tentative list as a UNESCO World Heritage Site.

== History ==
Until the 1760s, the indigenous tribes of Kanindé and Jenipapo populated the territory that is known as Quixadá. The fact that it used to be the land of indigenous explains why Quixadá does not have a Portuguese name. The conflicts between these groups and the Portuguese led to the indigenous peoples' extinction.

== Sports ==
Quixadá Futebol Clube is the town's soccer club.

Quixadá is a major paragliding spot in Brazil. It is famous for many flight distance world record breaks in the last years, and attracts pilots from around the world every November when potential record-breaking conditions prevail.

Hang gliding and climbing are other extreme sports popular in the area.

== Culture ==
The best-known figure from Quixadá is Rachel de Queiroz, a writer who portrayed the drought of 1915 in her novel "O Quinze (1930)," which later received national recognition. Queiroz was not born in Quixadá, but lived there for most of her life. In Quixadá, you can find three places dedicated to her: the Memorial Rachel de Queiroz, the former Chalé da Pedra; the Museu Rachel de Queiroz, which is located on her small farm, the Fazenda Não Me Deixes; and also the Rachel de Queiroz Cultural Center.

== Transportation ==
Quixadá is served by Quixadá Airport.

== Gallery ==
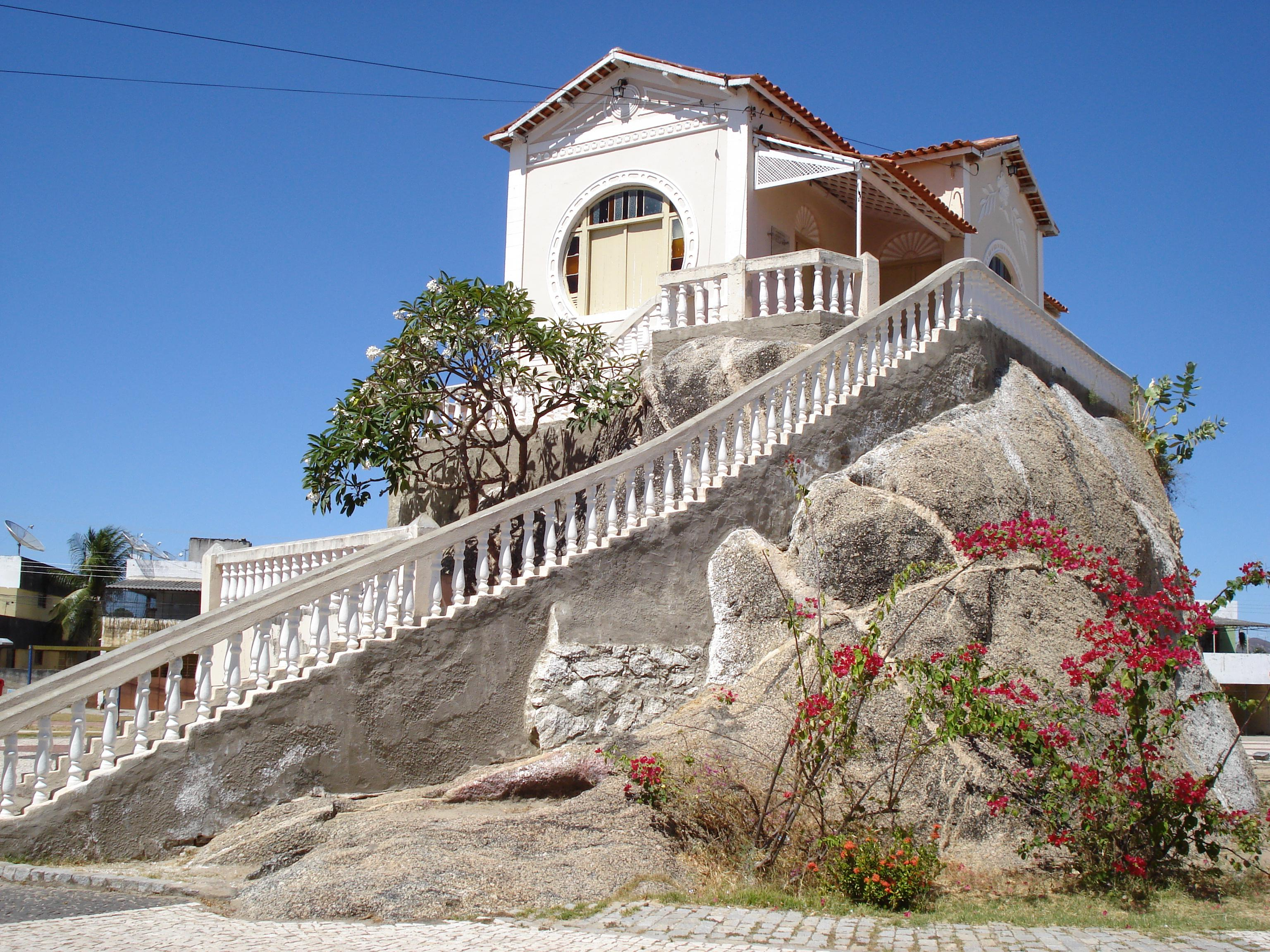
Chalet da Pedra

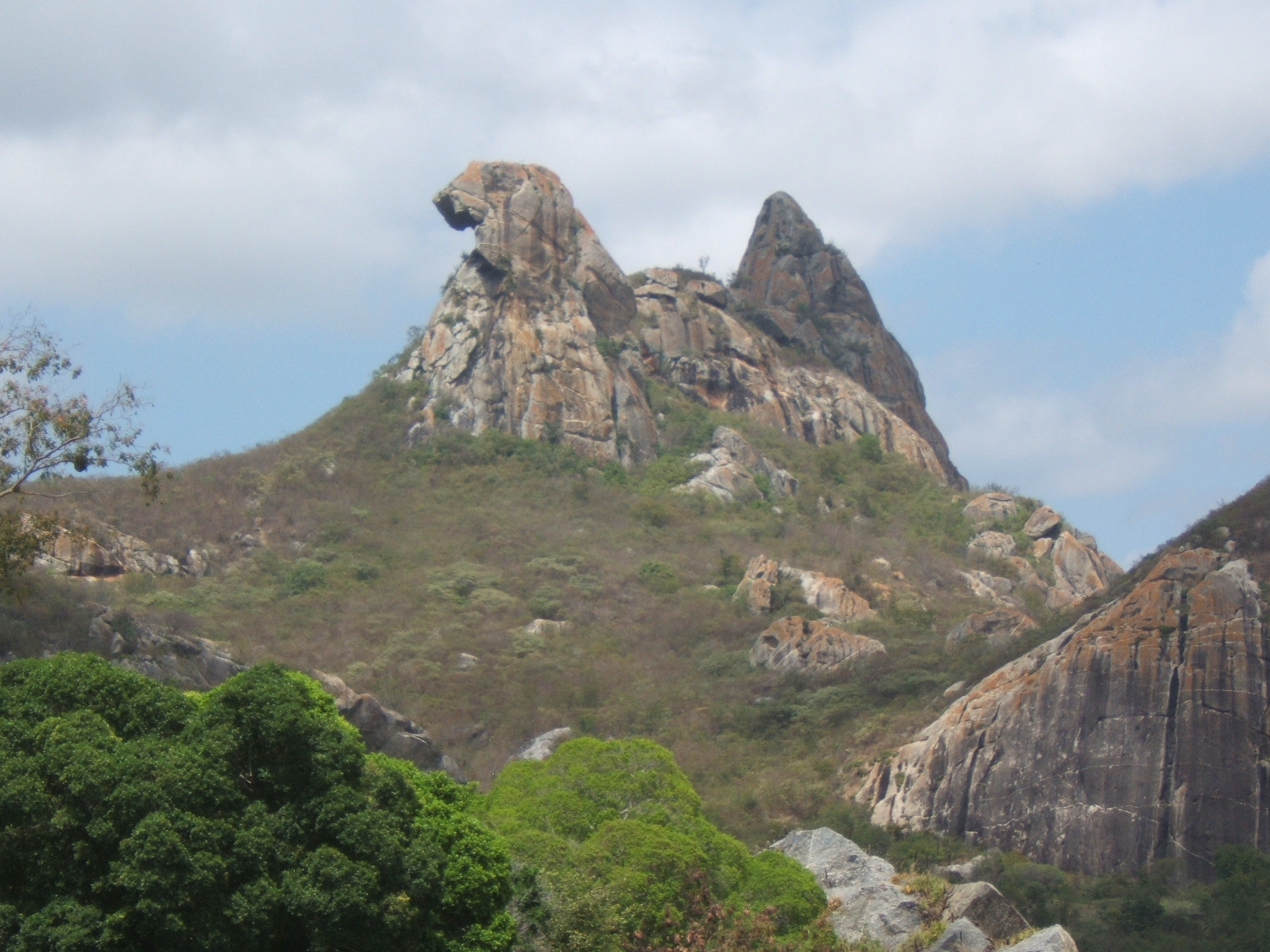
The Rock of the Galinha Choca

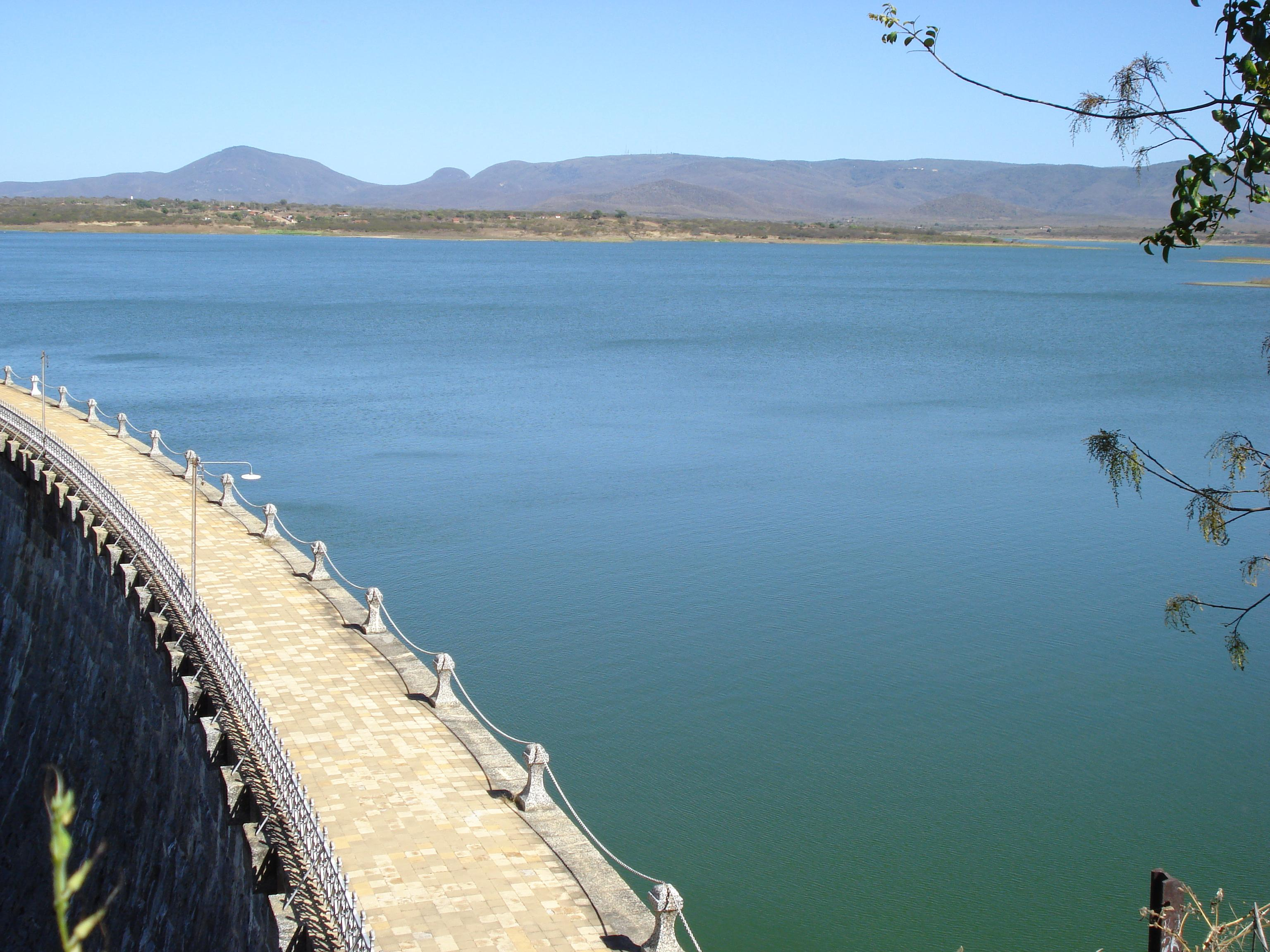
The historic Cedro dam

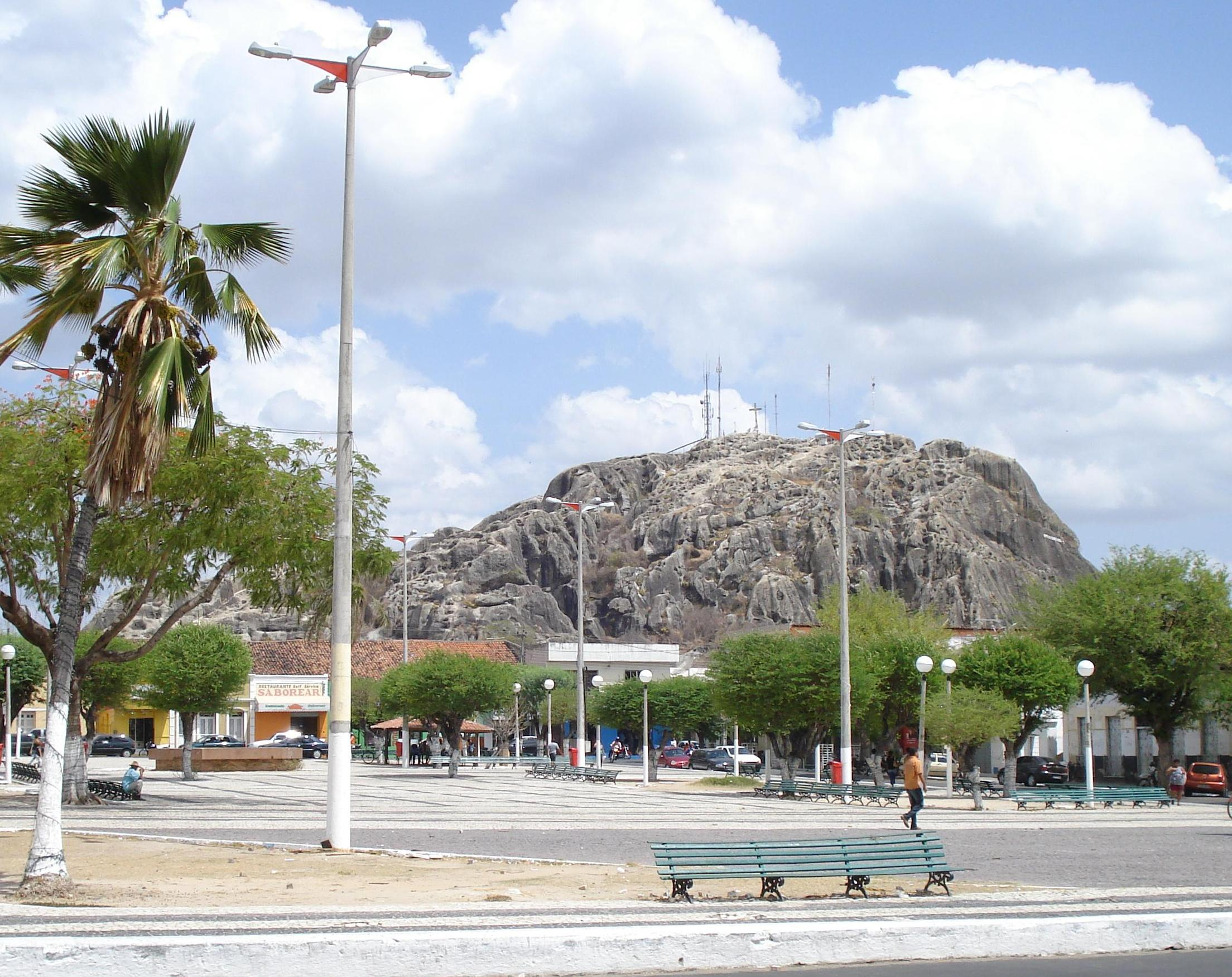
Pedra do Cruzeiro
