= José Mauro Ramalho =

Brazilian Roman Catholic bishop (1925–2019)

José Mauro Ramalho De Alarcón Santiago
- Bishop of Iguatu
- Church: Catholic Church
- Diocese: Diocese of Iguatu
- In office: 13 October 1961 – 26 July 2000
- Predecessor: Diocese erected
- Successor: José Doth de Oliveira

Orders
- Ordination: 5 December 1948 by Aureliano de Matos
- Consecration: 6 January 1962 by Aureliano de Matos

Personal details
- Born: 14 May 1925 Russas, Ceará, Republic of the United States of Brazil
- Died: 9 December 2019 (aged 94) Iguatu, Ceará, Brazil

José Mauro Ramalho De Alarcón Santiago (14 May 1925 – 9 December 2019) was a Brazilian Roman Catholic bishop.

Ramalho was born in Brazil and was ordained to the priesthood in 1948. He served as bishop of the Roman Catholic Diocese of Iguatu, Brazil from 1962 to 2000.
