= Pedra Branca, Ceará =

Municipality in Ceará, Brazil

Pedra Branca
- Municipality
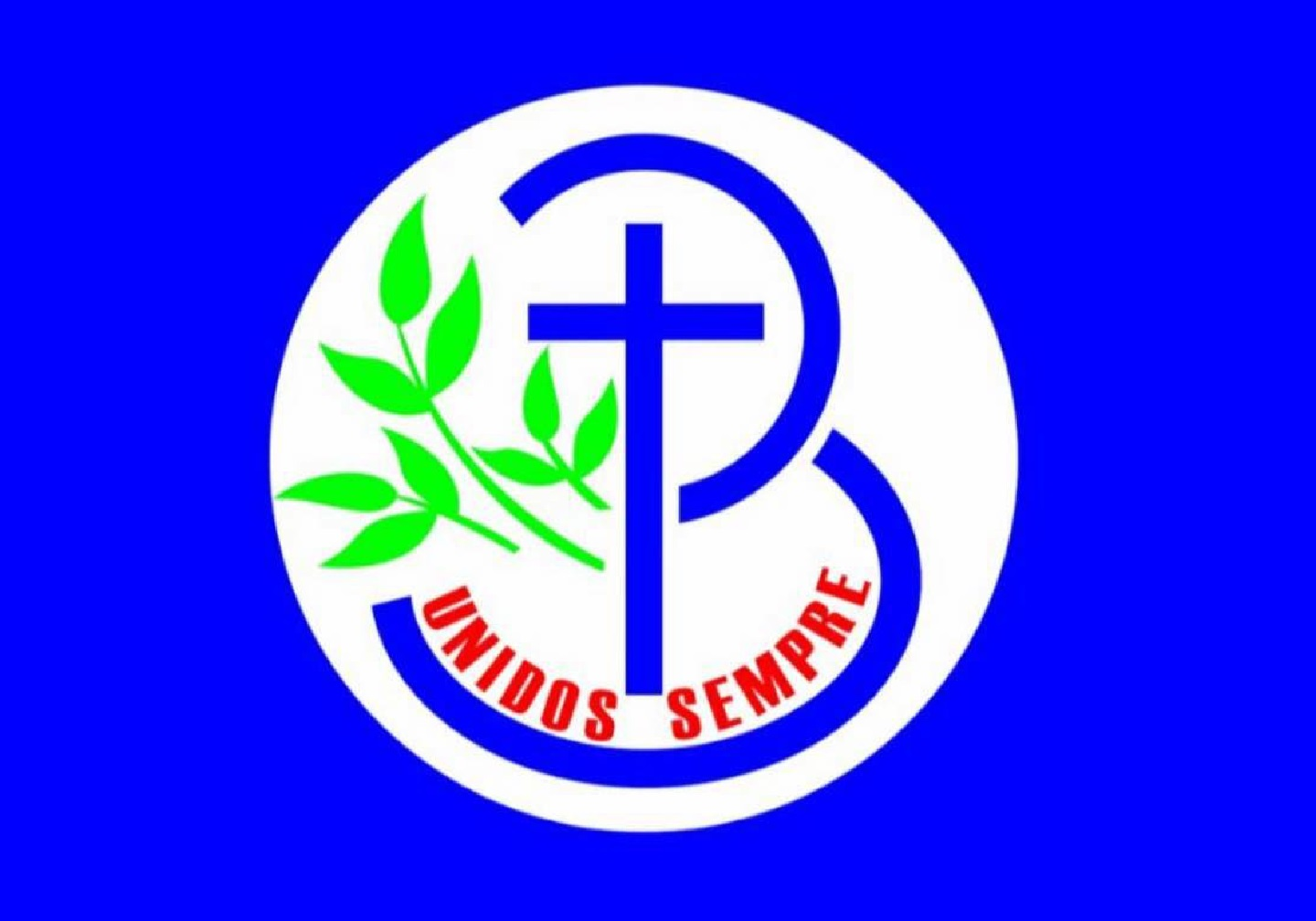
- Flag

- Location in Ceará state

- Location in Brazil
- Coordinates: 5°27′14″S 39°43′01″W
- Country: Brazil
- Region: Northeast
- State: Ceará

Population (2020)
  - Total: 43,309
- Time zone: UTC−3 (BRT)

Pedra Branca is a municipality in the state of Ceará, Brazil.
