= Gregório Leozírio Ben Lâmed da Paixão Neto =

20 & 21st century Brazilian Roman Catholic Archbishop

His Excellency, The Most Reverend, Monsignor. Dom. Gregório Leozírio Ben Lâmed da Paixão Neto, O.S.B.
- Metropolitan Archbishop of Fortaleza
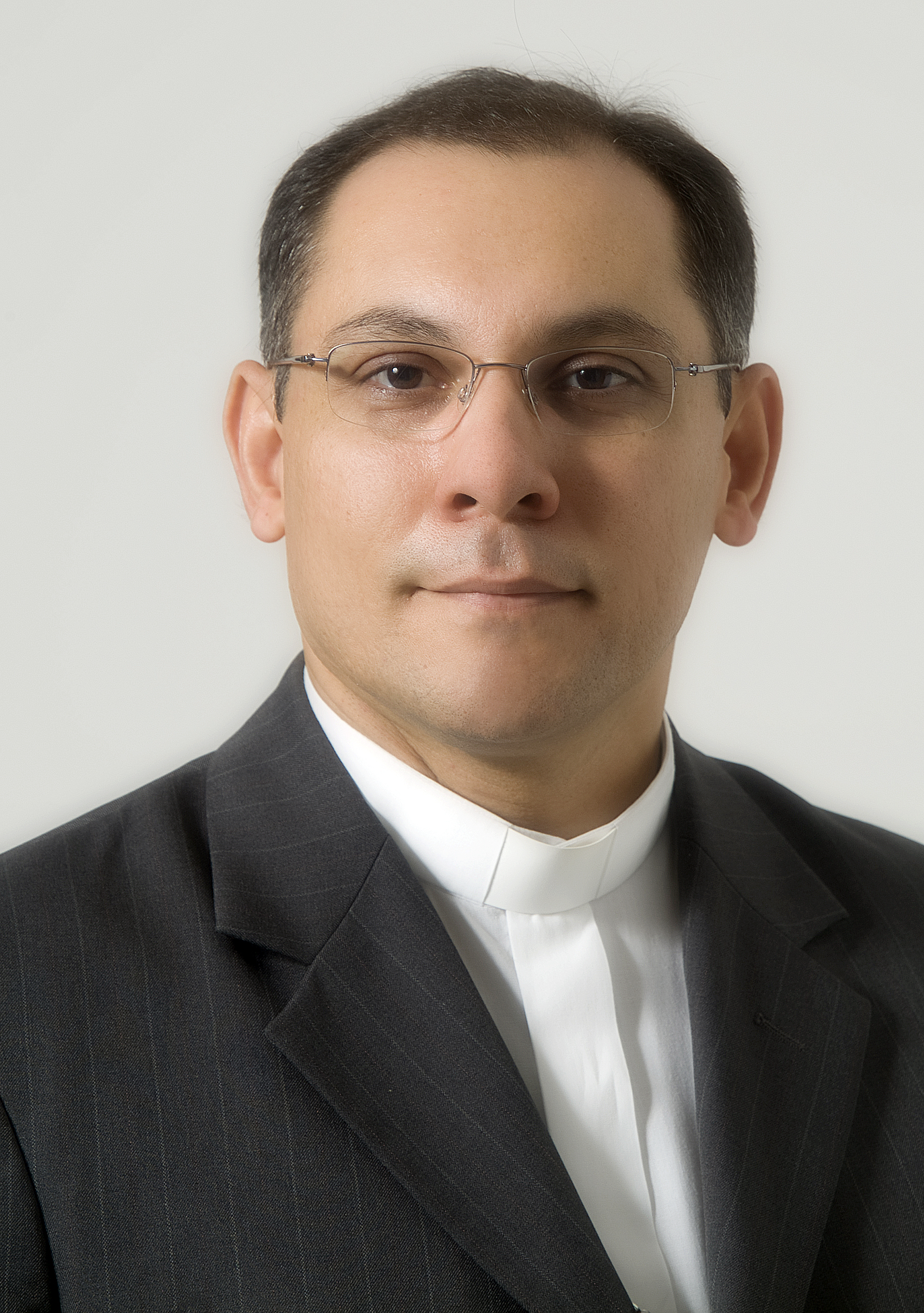
- Church: Roman Catholic Church
- Archdiocese: Fortaleza
- Province: Fortaleza
- Metropolis: Fortaleza
- Diocese: Fortaleza
- Appointed: 11 October 2023
- Installed: 15 December 2023
- Previous posts: Bishop of Petrópolis (2012-2023); Auxiliary Bishop of São Salvador da Bahia (2006-2012)

Orders
- Consecration: July 2006 by Geraldo Majella Agnelo
- Rank: Metropolitan Archbishop

Personal details
- Born: Gregóry Leozírio Ben Lâmed da Paixão Neto; November 3, 1964 (age 61) Aracaju, Brazil
- Denomination: Catholic Church
- Occupation: Archbishop, Prelate
- Education: Pontifical Gregorian University
- Motto: Parate Vias Domini

His Excellency, The Most Reverend, Monsignor. Dom. Gregório Leozírio Ben Lâmed da Paixão Neto, O.S.B.(born 3 November 1964) is a Brazilian prelate of the Catholic Church. He is a professed Benedictine monk. He has been appointed Metropolitan Archbishop of Fortaleza on 11 October 2023. He was previously the Bishop of Petrópolis (2012-2023) and Auxiliary Bishop of São Salvador da Bahia (2006-2012).

== Biography ==
Dom. Gregório Leozírio Ben Lâmed da Paixão Neto was born in Aracaju, Brazil, on 3 November 1964. He attended the Benedictine monastery in Rio de Janeiro, Brazil. There, He carried out his studies in philosophy and theology. In 1986 he gave his religious vows as the Benedictine monk, and in March 1993 he was ordained priest. He holds a doctoral degree in cultural anthropology from University of Amsterdam in Amsterdam, Netherlands.

He has served as Master of novices and prior of the Benedictine Monastery of Bahia; Director of the Colégio São Bento in Salvador-BA; Professor and director of the São Bento Faculty in Salvador-BA; Member of the Economic Board of the archdiocese of São Salvador da Bahia.

On 7 June 2006 he was appointed titular bishop of Fico and auxiliary of São Salvador da Bahia by Pope Benedict XVI, and received episcopal ordination on 29 July 2006. On 10 October 2012 he was transferred to Petrópolis as bishop. On 11 October 2023, Pope Francis named him as metropolitan archbishop of Fortaleza. His installation was held in December 2023.
