= Archdiocese of Fortaleza =

Catholic ecclesiastical territory

Coordinates: 3.7247°S 38.5244°W

Metropolitan Archdiocese of Fortaleza Archidioecesis Metropolitae Fortalexiensis Arquidiocese Metropolitana de Fortaleza

Catholic
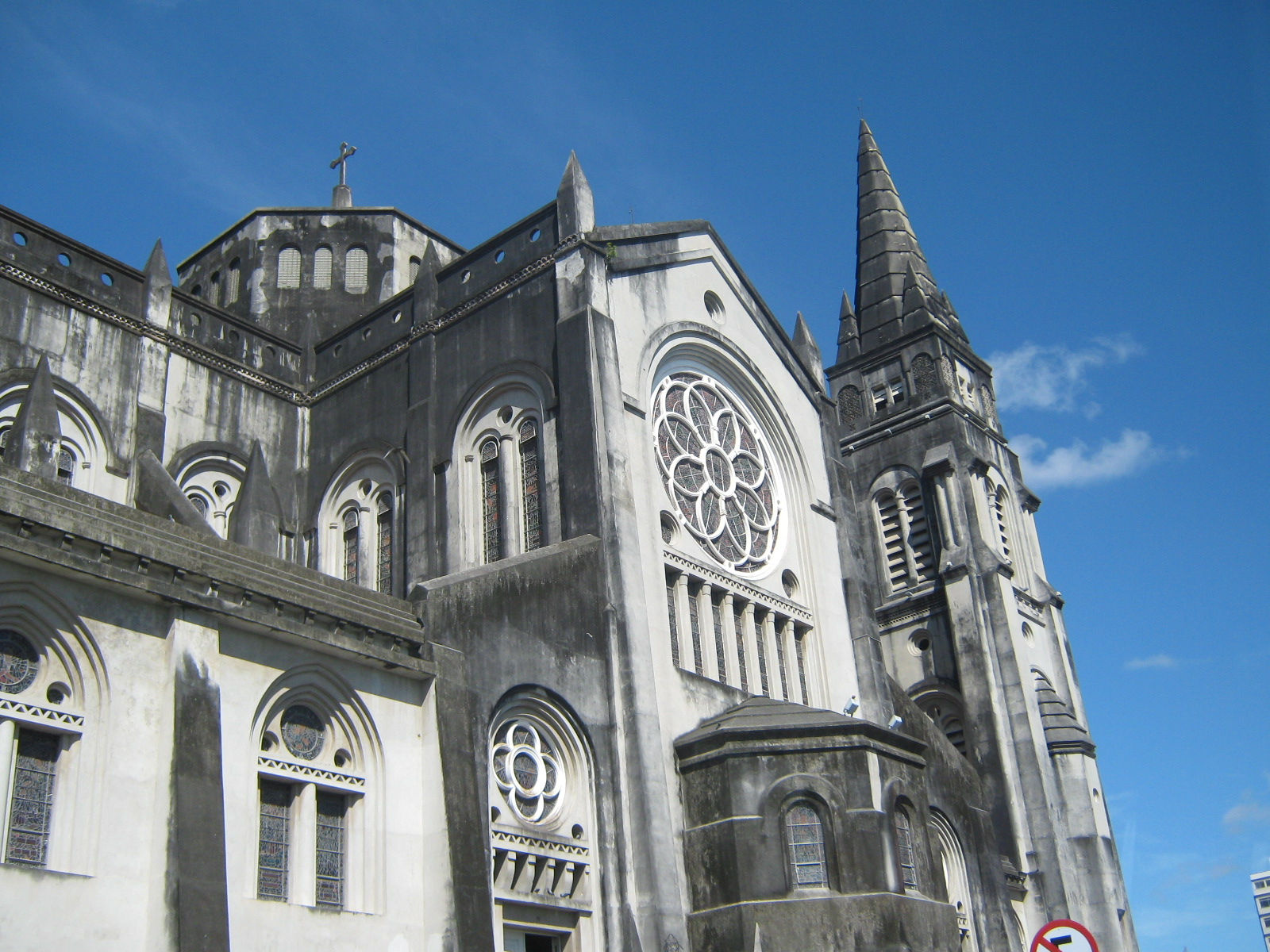
- Metropolitan Cathedral of St. Joseph

Location
- Country: Brazil
- Ecclesiastical province: Fortaleza

Statistics
- Area: 14,813 km^{2} (5,719 sq mi)
- Population: Total; Catholics: (as of 2006); 3,487,000; 2,466,000 (70.7%)

Information
- Rite: Latin Rite
- Established: 6 June 1854 (172 years ago)
- Cathedral: Cathedral of St Joseph in Fortaleza

Current leadership
- Pope: Leo XIV
- Metropolitan Archbishop: Gregório Leozírio Ben Lâmed da Paixão Neto
- Bishops emeritus: José Antônio Aparecido Tosi Marques

Website
- www.arquidiocesedefortaleza.org.br

The Metropolitan Archdiocese of Fortaleza (Latin: Archidioecesis Metropolitae Fortalexiensis) is an archdiocese located in the city of Fortaleza in Brazil.

== History ==
On June 6, 1854, it was established by Pope Pius IX, as the Diocese of Ceará from the Diocese of Olinda. Formerly a part of the Diocese of Pernambuco, the district was erected into a separate diocese, suffragan to the Archdiocese of Bahia. João Guerino Gomes was named as first bishop but did not accept the office. Father Gomes, a philosopher and orator who was well-known in his day, died in 1859. The first bishop, Luis Antonio dos Santos, founded the diocesan seminaries at Fortaleza and Crato, and, for the education of girls, the College of the Immaculate Conception, besides building the church of the Sacred Heart at Fortaleza. On November 10, 1915, it was promoted as the Metropolitan Archdiocese of Fortaleza.

== Special churches ==
Basilica of Saint Francis of the Wounds, Canindé

- After the creation of the Diocese of Baturité in 2026 by Pope Leo XIV, the sanctuary went under the jurisdiction of the new ecclesiastical territory.

== Bishops ==
Bishops of Ceará
Bishop	Term	Notes
Luís Antônio dos Santos	28 September 1860 – 13 March 1881	appointed Archbishop of São Salvador da Bahia
Joaquim José Vieira	9 August 1883 – 14 September 1912	
Manoel da Silva Gomes	16 September 1912 – 10 November 1915	

Metropolitan Archbishops of Fortaleza
Archbishops	Term	Notes
Manoel da Silva Gomes	10 November 1915 – 24 May 1941	
Antônio de Almeida Lustosa, SDB	19 July 1941 – 16 February 1963	
José de Medeiros Delgado	10 May 1963 – 26 March 1973	
Aloísio Lorscheider, OFM	26 March 1973 – 12 July 1995	elevated to Cardinal in 1976; appointed Archbishop of Aparecida, Sao Paulo
Cláudio Hummes, OFM	26 May 1996 – 15 April 1998	appointed Archbishop of São Paulo (Cardinal in 2001)
José Antônio Aparecido Tosi Marques	13 January 1999 – 11 October 2023	
Gregório Leozírio Ben Lâmed da Paixão Neto, O.S.B.	11 October 2023 - present	

Coadjutor bishop
Coadjutor Bishop	Term	Notes
Manuel Antônio de Oliveira Lopes	1908-1910	did not succeed to see; appointed Bishop of Alagôas

Auxiliary bishops
Auxiliary Bishop	Term	Notes
Manoel da Silva Gomes	1911-1912	appointed Bishop here
Elizeu Simões Mendes	1950-1953	appointed Bishop of Mossoró, Rio Grande do Norte
Expedito Eduardo de Oliveira	1953-1959	appointed Bishop of Patos, Paraiba
Raimundo de Castro e Silva	1957-1991	
Gérard-Paul-Louis-Marie de Milleville CSSp	1964-1984	Archbishop (personal title)
Miguel Fenelon Câmara Filho	1970-1974	appointed Coadjutor Archbishop of Maceió, Alagoas
Manuel Edmilson da Cruz	1974-1994	appointed Bishop of Limoeiro do Norte, Ceara
Geraldo Nascimento, OFMCap	1992-1997	
Adalberto Paulo da Silva	1995-2004	OFMCap
Sérgio da Rocha	2001-2007	appointed Coadjutor Archbishop of Teresina, Piaui; future Cardinal
Plínio José Luz da Silva	2001-2003	appointed Bishop of Picos, Piaui
José Luiz Ferreira Salles CSsR	2006-2012	appointed Bishop of Pesqueira, Pernambuco
Rosalvo Cordeiro de Lima	2011–2020	
José Luiz Gomes de Vasconcelos	2012-2015	appointed Bishop of Sobral, Ceara
Valdemir Vicente Andrade Santos	2018-2024	
Júlio César Souza de Jesus	2018-	

=== Other priests of this diocese who became bishops ===
- Antônio Xisto Albano, appointed Bishop of São Luís do Maranhão in 1901
- Quintino Rodrigues de Oliveira e Silva, appointed Bishop of Piaui in 1913 (did not take effect); appointed Bishop of Crato, Ceara in 1915

== Suffragan dioceses ==
- Diocese of Crateús
- Diocese of Crato
- Diocese of Iguatu
- Diocese of Itapipoca
- Diocese of Limoeiro do Norte
- Diocese of Quixadá
- Diocese of Sobral
- Diocese of Tianguá
- Diocese of Baturité

== Sources ==
- GCatholic.org
- Catholic Hierarchy
- Archdiocese website (Portuguese)
