= Immediate Geographic Region of Juiz de Fora =

Urban administrative region in Minas Gerais, Brazil

The Immediate Geographic Region of Juiz de Fora is one of the 10 immediate geographic regions in the Intermediate Geographic Region of Juiz de Fora, one of the 70 immediate geographic regions in the Brazilian state of Minas Gerais and one of the 509 of Brazil, created by the National Institute of Geography and Statistics (IBGE) in 2017.

== Municipalities ==
It comprises 29 municipalities:

- Andrelândia
- Aracitaba
- Arantina
- Belmiro Braga
- Bias Fortes
- Bocaina de Minas
- Bom Jardim de Minas
- Chácara
- Chiador
- Coronel Pacheco
- Ewbank da Câmara
- Goianá
- Juiz de Fora
- Liberdade
- Lima Duarte
- Matias Barbosa
- Olaria
- Oliveira Fortes
- Paiva
- Passa Vinte
- Pedro Teixeira
- Piau
- Rio Novo
- Rio Preto
- Santa Bárbara do Monte Verde
- Santa Rita de Jacutinga
- Santana do Deserto
- Santos Dumont
- Simão Pereira

== See also ==
- List of Intermediate and Immediate Geographic Regions of Minas Gerais
