= Paraibuna River (Minas Gerais) =

Rio Paraibuna
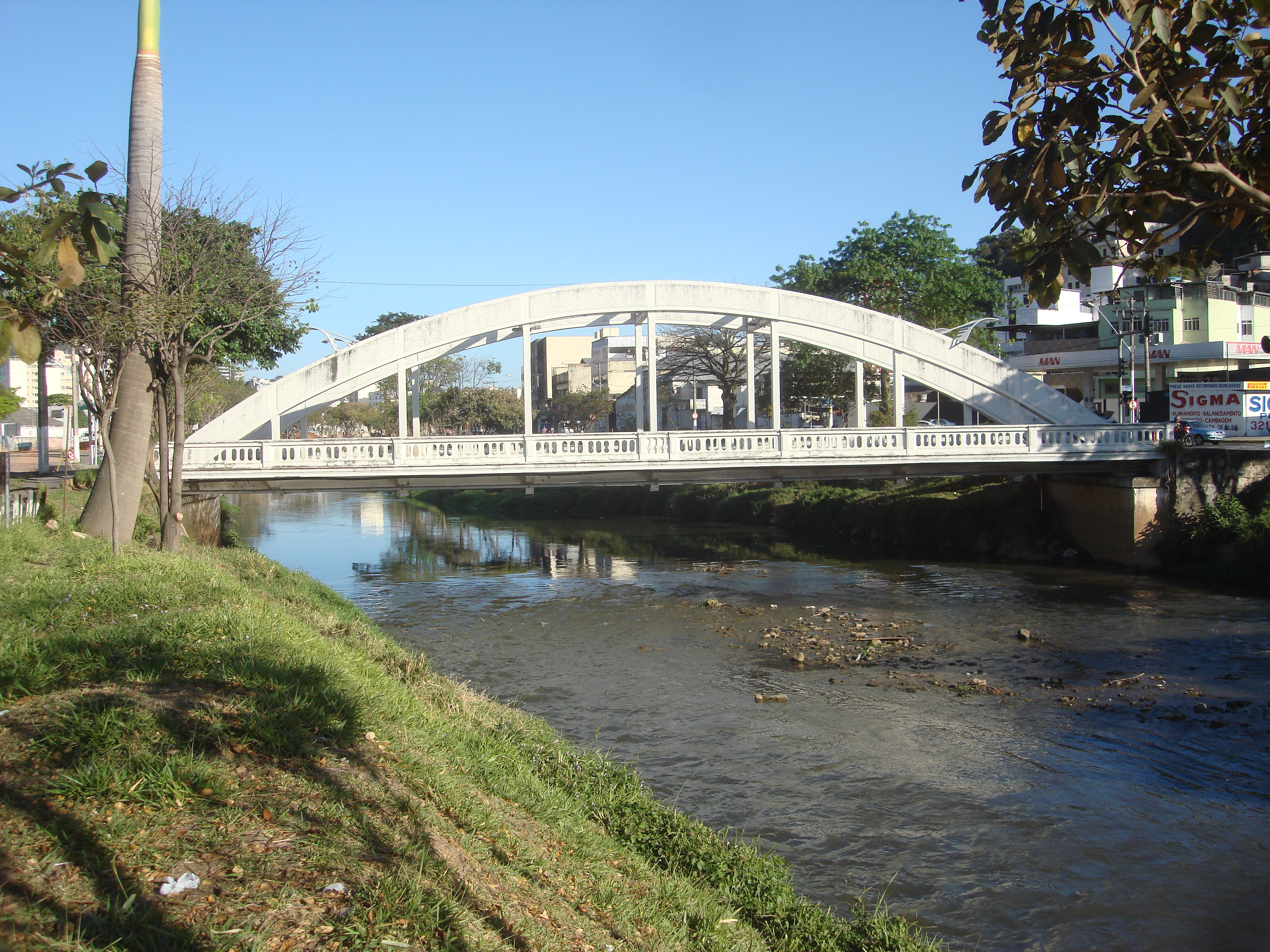

Location
- Country: Brazil
- State: Minas Gerais
- Cities: Antônio Carlos, Santos Dumont, Ewbank da Câmara, Juiz de Fora, Matias Barbosa, Simão Pereira, Belmiro Braga, Santana do Deserto, Chiador

Physical characteristics
- Source
  - location: Serra da Mantiqueira, Minas Gerais, Brazil
  - elevation: 1,200 m (3,900 ft)
- Mouth
  - location: Paraíba do Sul, Minas Gerais, Brazil
  - coordinates: 22°6′34″S 43°8′16″W
  - elevation: 250 m (820 ft)
- Length: 166 km (103 mi)

The Paraibuna is a river in Minas Gerais state, Brazil, and a major tributary of the Paraíba do Sul. It flows through the important commercial and industrial city of Juiz de Fora.

The name of the river probably comes from the Tupi "pará y b'una" signifying "great dark river".

The Paraibuna has its source near Antônio Carlos in the Serra da Mantiqueira at an elevation of 1,200 metres (3,900 ft). It then flows northwest to southeast for 166 kilometres (103 mi) through the cities of Antônio Carlos, Santos Dumont, Ewbank da Câmara, Juiz de Fora, Matias Barbosa, Simão Pereira, Belmiro Braga, Santana do Deserto and Chiador before joining the Paraíba do Sul at an elevation of 250 metres (820 ft). Its principal tributaries are the Preto, Peixe, and Cágado rivers. From its confluence with the Preto to its mouth on the Paraíba, it serves as the border between the states of Minas Gerais and Rio de Janeiro.

Along the valley of the Paraibuna were built the roads that opened up Minas Gerais and the Zona da Mata Mineira to settlement and development. Among these were the Caminho Novo das Minas in 1707, the Estrada União e Indústria in 1856 and also the Estrada de Ferro Central do Brasil railway.

The Marmelos Zero Power Plant, the first hydroelectric plant in South America, was built on the Paraibuna in 1889 by the industrial magnate Bernardo Mascarenhas. This first plant (Marmelos Zero) produced 250 KW, enough to supply 1,080 people at the time. Eight years later Usina 1 was inaugurated with an energy potential eight times greater. In 1915 came Usina 2, in 1935 Usina 3, and in 1950 Usina 4. Today 12.5% of the energy needs of Juiz de Fora comes from these plants.

== See also ==
- List of rivers of Minas Gerais
