= Bertante =

Bertante is a surname. Notable people with the surname include:

- Gabriela Bertante (born 1989), Brazilian model
- Glelberson Luís Leopoldino Bertante (born 1986), Brazilian footballer
