= Marmelo =

Marmelo (plural: marmelos) may refer to:

- the Portuguese word for the fruit quince
- Marcelo Marmelo da Silva (born 1972), a Brazilian former football player
- Marmelos Zero Power Plant, a decommissioned hydroelectric power plant on the Paraibuna River in Juiz de Fora, Minas Gerais, Brazil
- Dos Marmelos River, a river of Amazonas state in north-western Brazil
