= Eduardo Frieiro =

Brazilian food writer

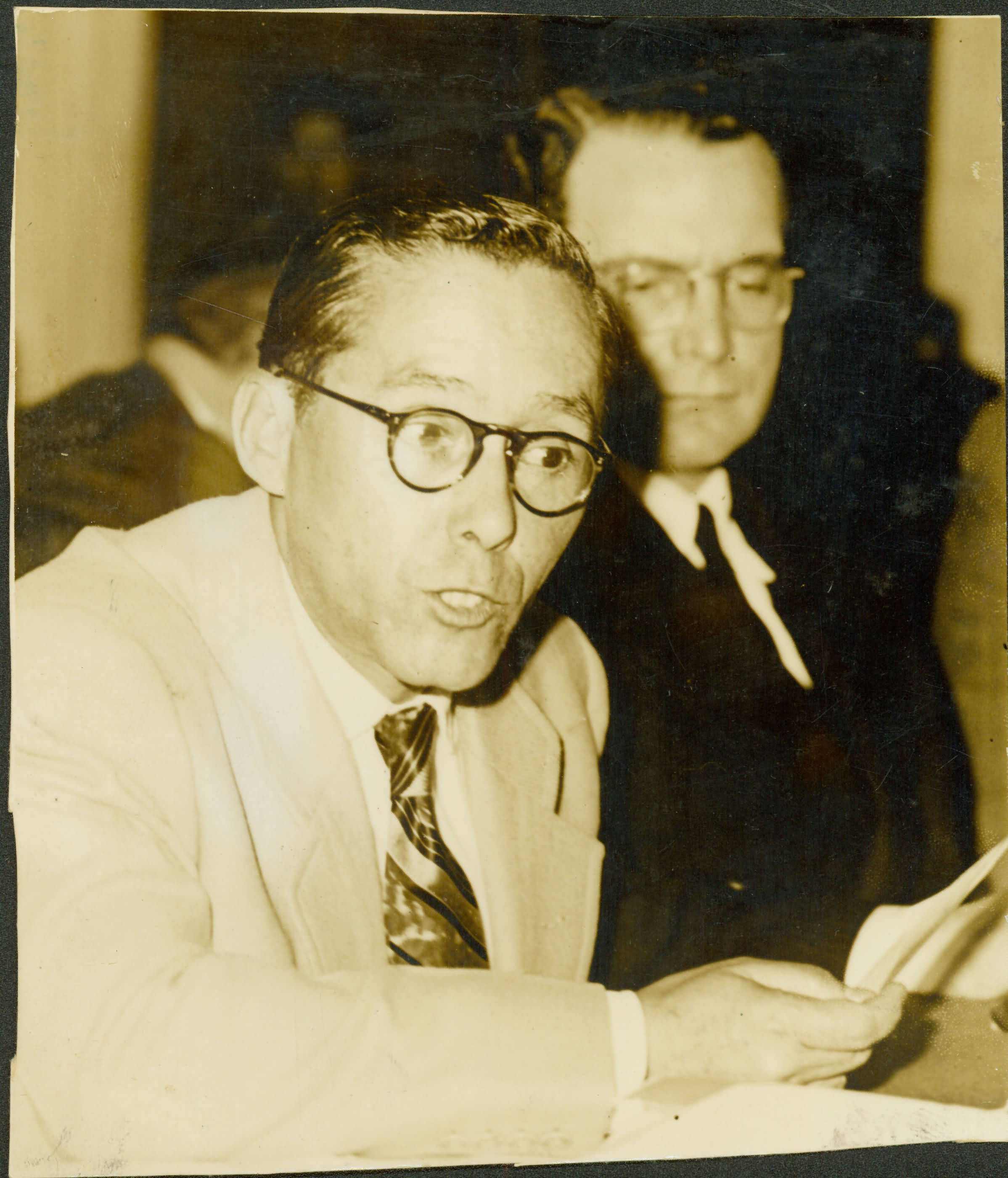
In 1950

Eduardo Frieiro (5 July 1889 – 24 March 1982) was a Brazilian novelist, literary critic, and professor. He is best known for the 1966 book Feijão, Angu e Couve, a study on the cuisine of Minas Gerais. In 1960, he received the Machado de Assis Prize for his body of work.

== Biography ==
Born in Matias Barbosa into a family of poor Galician immigrants, Frieiro had little formal education, having left school before completing his primary studies. He read widely across several languages, including French, Latin, Spanish, Italian, and English. A football player in his youth, he joined the local press to work as a typographer and later became a copyeditor at the newspaper Minas Gerais. He began his journalistic career contributing anonymous articles to Avante! and in 1927 he published the novel O clube dos grafômanos.

In 1930, he founded the house Sociedade Editora Amigos dos Livros, which published books by Carlos Drummond de Andrade. He was the founder and first director of the Biblioteca Pública Estadual Luiz de Bessa, one of the largest libraries in Belo Horizonte. He was among the earliest professors of the Faculty of Philosophy of Minas Gerais (now part of the Federal University of Minas Gerais), where he taught Hispano-American and Spanish Literature.

A bibliophile who collected books, documents, and newspapers, he corresponded with several intellectuals, including Manuel Rodrigues Lapa and Otto Maria Carpeaux, and assisted them in their research. He was a member of the Academia Mineira de Letras. In 2012, the state of Minas Gerais declared July 5 as the state's gastronomy day, in honor of Frieiro.
