= Cágado River (Minas Gerais) =

Coordinates: 22.0289°S 43.1317°W

Location
- Country: Brazil

Physical characteristics
- Source
  - location: Serra da Mantiqueira, state of Minas Gerais
- Mouth
  - elevation: 290 metres (950 ft)
- Length: 101 km (63 mi)

The Cágado River is a river of Minas Gerais state in southeastern Brazil. It rises in Chácara in the Serra da Mantiqueira and flows 101 kilometres (63 mi) to its mouth on the Paraibuna between Santana do Deserto and Chiador.

== See also ==
- List of rivers of Minas Gerais
