= Cágado River =

Cágado River may refer to rivers in Brazil:

- Cágado River (Minas Gerais)
- Cágado River (Sergipe)
- Cágado river, a river in the Brazilian state of Minas Gerais
