= Luís Gueguel =

Brazilian footballer

Personal information
- Full name: Glelberson Luís Leopoldino Bertante
- Date of birth: September 14, 1986 (age 40)
- Place of birth: Cotegipe-BA, Brazil
- Height: 1.90 m (6 ft 3 in)
- Position: Striker

Team information
- Current team: América de Teófilo Otoni

Youth career
- 2004: Tupi

Senior career*
Years	Team	Apps	(Gls)
2005	Atlético Araçatuba		
2006	Noroeste		
2006	América-SP		
2006	Rio Branco		
2007–2011	Palmeiras	13	(3)
2008	→ Ituano (loan)		
2008	→ Juventude (loan)		
2009	→ Barueri (loan)	6	(2)
2010	→ Boavista (loan)		
2010	→ Santo André (loan)	5	(0)
2011	→ Bragantino (loan)	13	(1)
- * Club domestic league appearances and goals

Glelberson Luís Leopoldino Bertante (born September 14, 1986 in Matias Barbosa), or simply Luís Gueguel, is a Brazilian football striker. His younger sister Gabriela Bertante has appeared in Indian regional films.
