= Balwinder Singh Famous Ho Gaya =

- Theatrical release poster
- Directed by: Sunil Agnihotri
- Screenplay by: Rajan Agarwal; Sanjeev Soni; Shrikant Vishvakarma
- Story by: Rajan Agarwal
- Produced by: Mika Singh; Sunil Agnihotri; Vandana Jain
- Starring: Shaan; Mika Singh; Gabriela Bertante; Anupam Kher; Rajpal Yadav; Asrani; Vindu Dara Singh
- Cinematography: Nirmal Jani
- Edited by: Aseem Sinha
- Music by: Mika Singh; Lalit Pandit
- Release date: 26 September 2014
- Running time: 136 minutes
- Country: India
- Language: Hindi

Balwinder Singh Famous Ho Gaya (transl. Balwinder Singh has become famous) is a 2014 Indian Hindi-language comedy drama film, directed by Sunil Agnihotri and produced by Sunil Agnihotri Productions and Vandana Motion Pictures Pvt Ltd.

== Plot ==
Balwinder Singh Famous Ho Gaya is about two central characters Mika Singh and Shaan and the confusion they create to win the heart of the girl of their dreams because of their same name 'Balwinder Singh'.

== Cast ==
- Shaan as Balwinder Singh Ludianewale
- Mika Singh as Balwinder Singh Patialewale
- Gabriela Bertante as Jenny / Lakshmi / Madame Maya
- Anupam Kher
- Rajpal Yadav
- Asrani
- Vindu Dara Singh
- Manjot Singh as real Balwinder "Ballu" Singh (cameo)
- Sunny Leone and Ganesh Acharya in a special appearance in the song "Shake that booty"

== Soundtrack ==
The soundtrack was composed by Lalit Pandit.

=== Track listing ===
No.	Title	Singer(s)	Length
1.	"Shake That Booty"	Mika Singh	2:49
2.	"Kenny Ji"	Shaan	2:19
3.	"Bhopu"	Mika Singh, Shaan	2:23
4.	"Kaun Samjhaye"	Mika Singh	2:25
5.	"Main Tera Hoon"	Mika Singh	2:28
Total length:			11:44

== Reception ==
Renuka Vyavahare of The Times of India rated the film 2/5 stars and wrote, "While the first half decently entertains, things go haywire as the story progresses. Barring a scene or two, the writing is neither clever nor funny enough to make you laugh. The length of the film is another issue." Vinayak Chakravorty of India Today gave it 1/5 stars and wrote, "BSFHG makes humour seem like an agony, so when the film is finally over you are scurrying for the exit door happy to have forgotten all of it even before you have left the hall."

Rachit Gupta of Filmfare wrote, "It’s funny in parts, foolish all throughout and at times, thanks to its unpleasant sexual humour, it even becomes cringe worthy. And it never abandons its stereotypical or caricatured nature. [...] Director Sunil Agnihotri it seems is still making films in the ’90s. It’s a technical disaster." Sudhish R. Kamath of The Hindu wrote, "the catchy songs (most of them feature women in bikini tops) sung by the two talented leads, Balwinder Singh Famous Ho Gaya has absolutely no other redeeming factor. This is the kind of fare people may find funny only on TV — sitting at a bar, late at night." Rahul Desai of Mumbai Mirror wrote, "Brainless comedies can be fun to watch, what with the infinite characters, goofy plots and toilet humour. But the buck stops with lazy filmmaking—a crime that can ruin the best of punch lines."
