= Cameraman Gangatho Rambabu =

2012 film by Puri Jagannadh

- Theatrical release poster
- Directed by: Puri Jagannadh
- Written by: Puri Jagannadh
- Produced by: D. V. V. Danayya; S. Radha Krishna (presenter)
- Starring: Pawan Kalyan; Tamannaah Bhatia; Gabriela Bertante; Prakash Raj; Kota Srinivasa Rao
- Cinematography: Shyam K. Naidu
- Edited by: S. R. Shekhar
- Music by: Mani Sharma
- Production company: Universal Media
- Distributed by: Sri Venkateswara Creations (Nizam); Bunny Vasu (West Godavari); 14 Reels Entertainment (Krishna)
- Release date: 18 October 2012
- Running time: 154 minutes
- Country: India
- Language: Telugu
- Budget: ₹25 crore

Cameraman Gangatho Rambabu (transl. Rambabu with Cameraman Ganga) is a 2012 Indian Telugu-language political action comedy film written and directed by Puri Jagannadh. The film stars Pawan Kalyan, Tamannaah Bhatia, and Gabriela Bertante, Prakash Raj and Kota Srinivasa Rao. Mani Sharma composed the soundtrack and background score, while Shyam K. Naidu and S. R. Shekhar handled the cinematography and editing. It was the second collaboration between Pawan and Puri after 12 years since Badri (2000).

Cameraman Gangatho Rambabu was theatrically released worldwide on 18 October 2012, garnering positive reviews from critics.

== Plot ==
Rambabu is a short-tempered mechanic who has a kind heart as well as a tendency to react to various social incidents shown or published in the electronic media. After studying and observing his personality, Ganga, a cameraman from NC Channel, offers him a job as a journalist, which he accepts. Jawahar Naidu, who is the state's ex-CM, tries to collapse the current government headed by Chandrasekhar Reddy and regain the post of CM, where he is strongly supported by his son, Rana "Ranababu" Naidu, a newbie to politics.

Dasaradh Ram is a reputed journalist who supplies proof of the scams and atrocities committed by Jawahar Naidu to NC channel, only to be brutally murdered by Ranababu. Although everyone, including the police, is aware that Ranababu is behind this, they remain silent out if fear. Rambabu valiantly opposes him and gets him arrested. However, Ranababu is released from prison with the help of his political contacts, and he challenges Rambabu to become the CM by using the media. A war ensues between Rambabu and Ranababu, where Rambabu enters politics. For gaining political mileage, Ranababu starts a movement opposing the presence of non-Telugu people in Andhra Pradesh. It gains huge traction and he even injures Rambabu severely, but he is rescued by Smitha, who works for a rival news channel.

Rambabu later joins Smitha's news channel after getting discharged from the hospital. He tricks Ranababu into making some controversial statements on air, thus destroying the momentum of his movement. To gain sympathy votes, Ranababu makes Jawahar Naidu deliver his last speech and kills him, which is secretly recorded by Ranababu's driver, who later calls Rambabu and Smitha to show them the video. After this, Smitha arrives and shoots Rambabu, where she steals the video and makes a deal with Ranababu to disclose the whole for a hefty price.

After Rambabu recuperates, he makes a dispassionate and successful appeal to the youth of Andhra Pradesh, who get influenced by his speech. The following day, Rambabu, along with a huge crowd, reaches the building where Ranababu is hosting a party for his colleagues. Rambabu sends a message to the Commissioner that Ranababu's guests should vacate the building to avoid being killed by the people along with Ranababu. Before leaving, Smitha orders to telecast the video, only to be murdered by Ranababu. Ranababu arrives outside with his pistol and shoots Rambabu, but he is killed in a stampede and Rambabu reaches an ambulance, accompanied by Ganga.

== Cast ==
- Pawan Kalyan as Rambabu, a mechanic-turned-journalist
- Tamannaah Bhatia as Ganga, NC Channel cameraman
- Gabriela Bertante as Smitha, rival news channel worker
- Prakash Raj as Rana "Ranababu" Naidu, Jawahar Naidu's son
- Kota Srinivasa Rao as ex-Chief Minister Jawahar Naidu, the opposition leader
- Brahmanandam as Bobby
- Nassar as Chandrasekhar Reddy, the Chief Minister of Andhra Pradesh
- Surya as Dasaradh Ram
- Ali as SRK
- Dharmavarapu Subramanyam as the MD of NC channel
- M. S. Narayana as Narayana, Rambabu's uncle
- Tanikella Bharani as Narayana Murthy, Rana's uncle
- Prudhvi Raj as an MLA
- Mukhtar Khan as a police officer
- Dhanraj as a blind beggar
- Syed Sohel as Rambabu's supporter (uncredited role)

Cameo appearance

- Scarlett Mellish Wilson in the song "Joramochindhi"

== Production ==
=== Development ===
Pawan Kalyan previously worked with Puri Jagannadh on Badri, which was Puri's debut film. On 18 January 2012, Puri announced on Twitter that Pawan had agreed to do another film with him, with filming set to begin in mid-2012. On 25 January 2012, Puri revealed that the film would be produced by D. V. V. Danayya under the Universal Media banner and that shooting would commence in May 2012 after Pawan completed Gabbar Singh. On 10 February 2012, Puri announced on Twitter that he was in Bangkok and had finished writing the first half of the film. He announced the film's title, Cameraman Gangatho Rambabu, and shared its logo on Twitter, marking it as his 25th film.

=== Casting ===
It was announced on 14 March 2012 that Prakash Raj, Brahmanandam, Ali, Tanikella Bharani, and Kota Srinivasa Rao were cast for vital roles in the film. It was reported that Pawan Kalyan would be seen in the role of a news reporter and the female lead will be played by Tamannaah Bhatia. Gabriela Bertante, who performed an item number in Puri Jagannadh's Devudu Chesina Manushulu (2012), was chosen to play the second female lead role. Scarlett Wilson has been roped for an item song.

=== Filming ===
Principal photography for the film commenced in mid-June, predominantly in Hyderabad, and wrapped-up by late-September.

== Music ==
The music of the film was composed by Mani Sharma, collaborating with Puri Jagannadh and Pawan Kalyan for the second time. The album consists of six songs, with all lyrics penned by Bhaskarabhatla. The audio songs of the film were well received by the audience.

== Release ==
Cameraman Gangatho Rambabu was released on 18 October 2012 in over 1500 screens. On the second day of its release following protests by Telangana supporters against objectionable scenes which they claimed hurt their sentiments and allegedly belittling the pro-Telangana movement, the screening of the film was stopped in many theatres across Telangana region. As the controversy surrounding objectionable scenes in the film continues to affect its screening in several Telangana districts, a committee constituted by the Government has recommended cuts and modifications of nine scenes.

=== Distribution rights ===
Dil Raju secured the film's theatrical distribution rights for the Nizam region. Bunny Vasu acquired the rights for West Godavari, while 14 Reels Entertainment obtained the rights for Krishna District.

=== Home media ===
The VCD's, DVD's and Blu-ray discs of the film were released into the market through Aditya Video company on 17 January 2013.

== Reception ==
=== Critical response ===
The film received positive reviews from critics.

Karthik Pasupulate of The Times of India gave the film 3.5/5 stars and mentioned, "Well, it’s cheesy alright, but there’s enough entertainment value in it provided you leave your brains at home." Radhika Rajamani of Rediff.com gave the film 2.5/5 stars and wrote, "With Cameraman Gangatho Rambabu, Puri Jagannadh is trying to look for an idealistic situation. If one is fond of movies with a political backdrop and is a fan of Pawan Kalyan, CGR may make for a one-time watch." Way2movies gave it 3.25/5 stars and stated, "A sincere attempt by Puri Jagannadh. Watch Pawan Kalyan's terrific on-screen presence in Cameraman Gangatho Rambabu." Jeevi of Idlebrain gave 3.25/5 stars and expressed that the strengths of the film are Pawan Kalyan's explosive performance and Puri Jagan's superb characterization/dialogues. On the flip side, the holistic approach and strong villain characterization are missing in the film. There is enough firepower in the movie to make it commercially work.

Mahesh S. Koneru of 123telugu gave 3.25/5 stars and stated, "Cameraman Gangatho Rambabu is a movie that works primarily due to Pawan Kalyan's sheer force and powerful on-screen presence. A good second half, solid punch dialogues, and a terrific performance from Pawan elevate the movie. A better script and more involving characters would have helped the movie. The film will be a great watch for those who are interested in politics, and a decent one for regular movie lovers." SuperGoodMovies review gave 3.25/5 stars and stated, "Go and watch Cameraman Gangatho Rambabu for Powerstar Pawan Kalyan's best performance. Cameraman Gangatho Rambabu is packaged with full of entertainment. A hit for Pawan Kalyan this year." Shekhar from Oneindia Entertainment gave 3.5/5 stars and stated that what strikes viewers is the way Puri has presented this subject on screen. Pawan Kalyan's performance stands out in it. It is a good treat for both class and mass audiences, and it is a must-watch film for Powerstar fans. NaChaKi from Telugu Cinema rated the film 3.25/5 stars and wrote, "Cameraman Gangatho Rambabu is a treat for Pawan Kalyan's fans and for Puri's fans, with its central theme actually going above and beyond the star and the star-director."

=== Box office ===
Cameraman Gangatho Rambabu had a successful start, earning ₹13.5 crore on its opening day domestically and grossing ₹59.8 crore worldwide in theaters and became an above average.

== Controversy ==
The film sparked significant political tension in Andhra Pradesh, as its characters were likened to leaders from the Telangana movement. Telangana Rashtra Samithi leader D. Sravan insisted that merely deleting certain scenes wouldn't appease the people and called for a complete ban on its screening. The Telugu Desam Party (TDP) also pushed for a ban, alleging that it not only portrayed their leaders unfavourably but also mocked N. Chandrababu Naidu and his son Nara Lokesh. TDP activists staged protests demanding the movie's prohibition. In an attempt to quell the controversy, the producers of Cameraman Gangatho Rambabu were compelled to eliminate objectionable content from the film.

== Accolades ==
2nd South Indian International Movie Awards

- SIIMA Award for Best Female Playback Singer – Telugu – Geetha Madhuri for "Melikalu"
