= Fernando Cedrola =

Brazilian footballer (born 1986)

Personal information
- Full name: Fernando Cedrola de Souza
- Date of birth: December 27, 1986 (age 39)
- Place of birth: Juiz de Fora, Brazil
- Height: 1.88 m (6 ft 2 in)
- Position: Defender

Team information
- Current team: Club Aurora

Senior career*
Years	Team	Apps	(Gls)
?–2008	Juventude	10	(0)
2008	Tupi	-	
2008–2010	C.D. Nacional	-	
2010–2011	Benevento Calcio	-	
2011–2013	Club Aurora		
- * Club domestic league appearances and goals as of 12:07, 1 December 2008 (UTC)

Fernando Cedrola de Souza (born December 27, 1986) is a Brazilian footballer currently playing for Club Aurora who signed him as a free transfer in 2011.

He previously played for clubs including Benevento.
