= Cabangu Museum =

Museum in Minas Gerais, Brazil

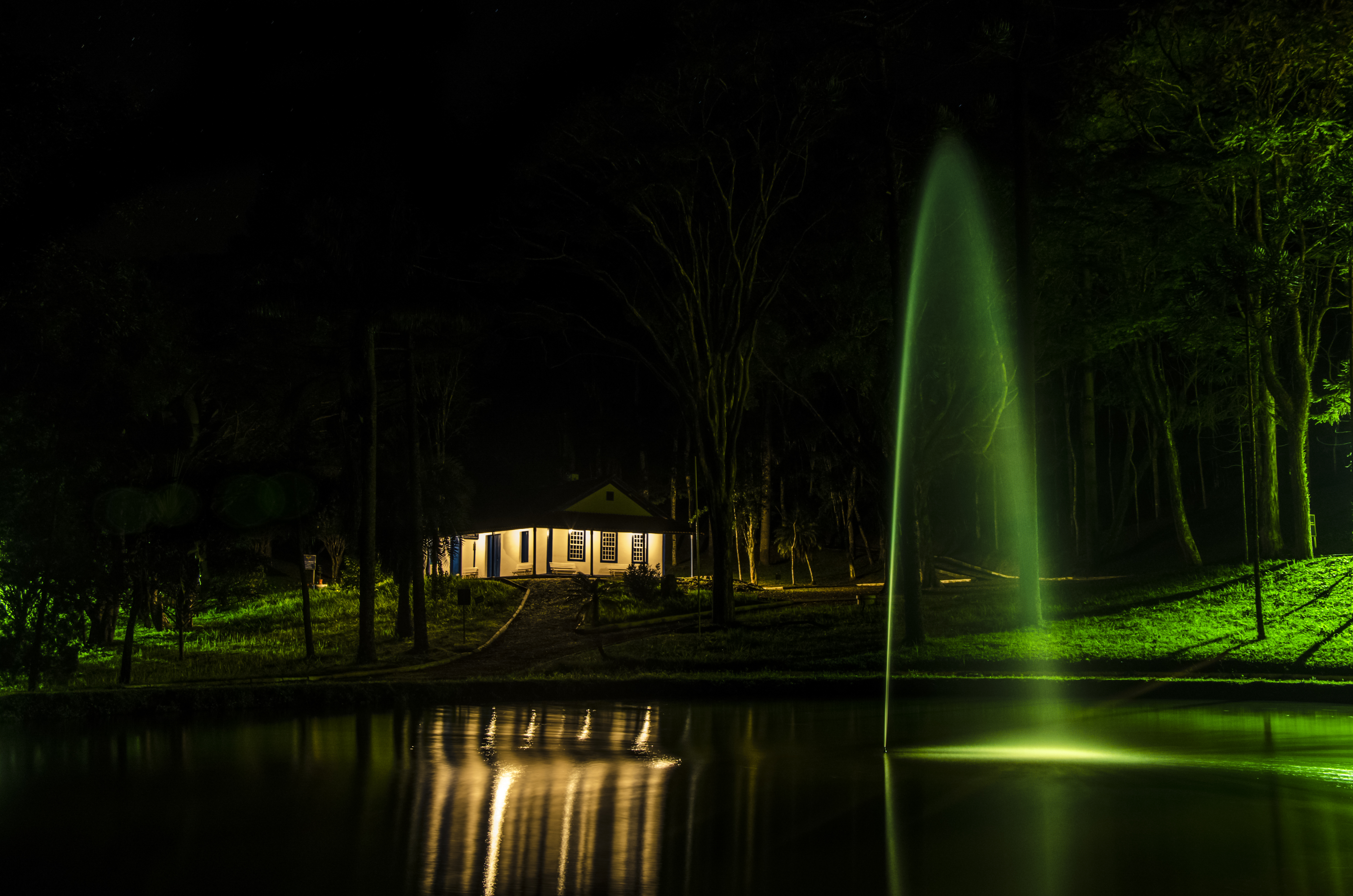
- Established: 1973 (53 years ago)
- Location: Santos Dumont, Minas Gerais, Minas Gerais, Brazil
- Coordinates: 21°25′30″S 43°40′28″W

The Cabangu Museum (Portuguese: Museu de Cabangu) is a museum in the town of Santos Dumont, Brazil. It is dedicated to the memory of Alberto Santos-Dumont, the "Father of Aviation".

In the house, personal objects, photos and the aviation museum are still preserved. In the Museum are also deposited the ashes of the first woman pilot of the Brazilian aviation, Anésia Pinheiro Machado.

== Cabangu ==
There are three versions for the meaning of the word "Cabangu":

- The first, somewhat folkloric, comes from the transformation of the phrase "The angu is over" (in Portuguese: Acabou o angu), used by the old residents at the time of the construction of the railroad in the region, that with the passage of time became Cabangu.
- The second, would be a place where, at the time of the Inconfidência Mineira, a caboclo lived with the surname "Cabangu".
- The third, whose etymology would originate in the Tupi-Guarani, name of the beginning of the Mantiqueira region: "Caa (woods) / bangu (dark).

== Financial problems ==
The Museum has been suffering from lack of cash, labor debts and inability to maintain and restore content. The institution even tried to make crowdfunding, but has been closed a few times for lack of funds.

== See also ==
- Timeline of aviation
