= Gabriela Bertante =

Brazilian model and actress

- Born: Gabriela Bertante; Matias Barbosa, Minas Gerais, Brazil
- Occupations: Actress, dancer, model
- Years active: 2012–2014

Gabriela Bertante is a Brazilian former model and actress who appears in Indian films, mainly in Telugu, Hindi and Tamil-language films.

== Early life and career ==
Gabriela Bertante notes that as a teenager aged 17, she used to help her parents at their store in her hometown in Matias Barbosa, Minas Gerais, Brazil before she moved to São Paulo to begin a career in modelling. Bertante also took her football seriously and played in regional soccer leagues, while her brother Glelberson Luís Leopoldino Bertante has played football professionally for several Brazilian teams including Palmeiras. She moved to India in 2010 and took part in the Lakme Fashion Week and was featured in several magazines which caught the attention of MTV who cast her as a VJ in MTV Grind.

She made her lead debut with the Telugu film Cameraman Gangatho Rambabu (2012) and was a part of the Hyderabad schedule. She debuted in Bollywood with the movie Balwinder Singh Famous Ho Gaya alongside Shaan and Mika Singh.

== Filmography ==
Year	Film	Role	Language	Notes
2012	Billa II		Tamil	Special appearance in the song "Yedho Mayakkam"
2012	Devudu Chesina Manushulu		Telugu	Special appearance in the song "Disturb Chettanade"
2012	Cameraman Gangatho Rambabu	Smitha	Telugu	
2014	Balwinder Singh Famous Ho Gaya	Jenny / Lakshmi / Madame Maya	Hindi	
