= Arantina =

- Municipality
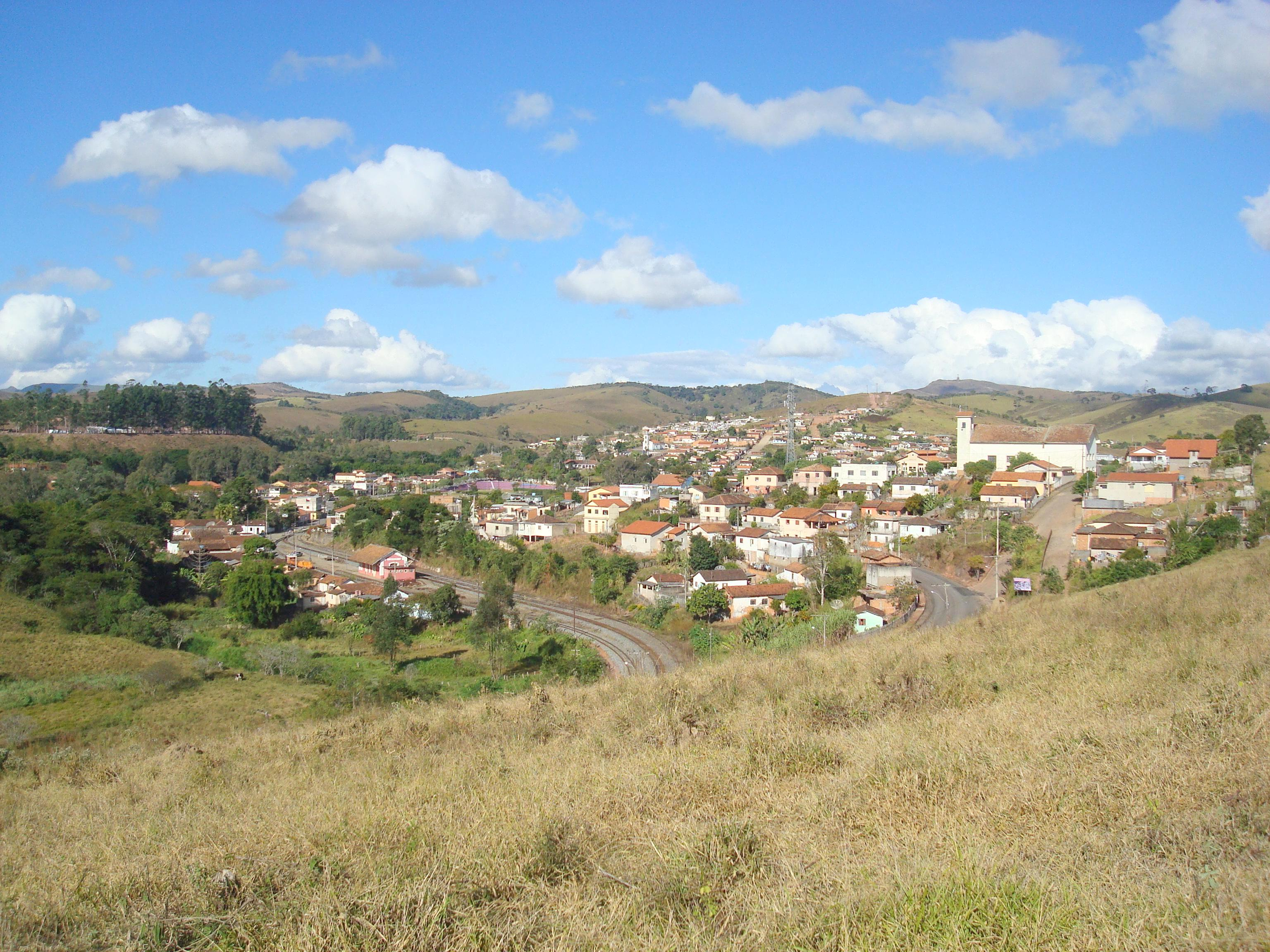
- Partial view of Arantina

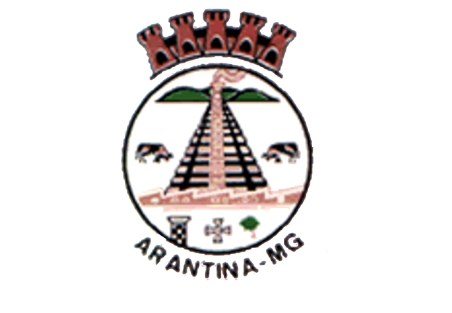
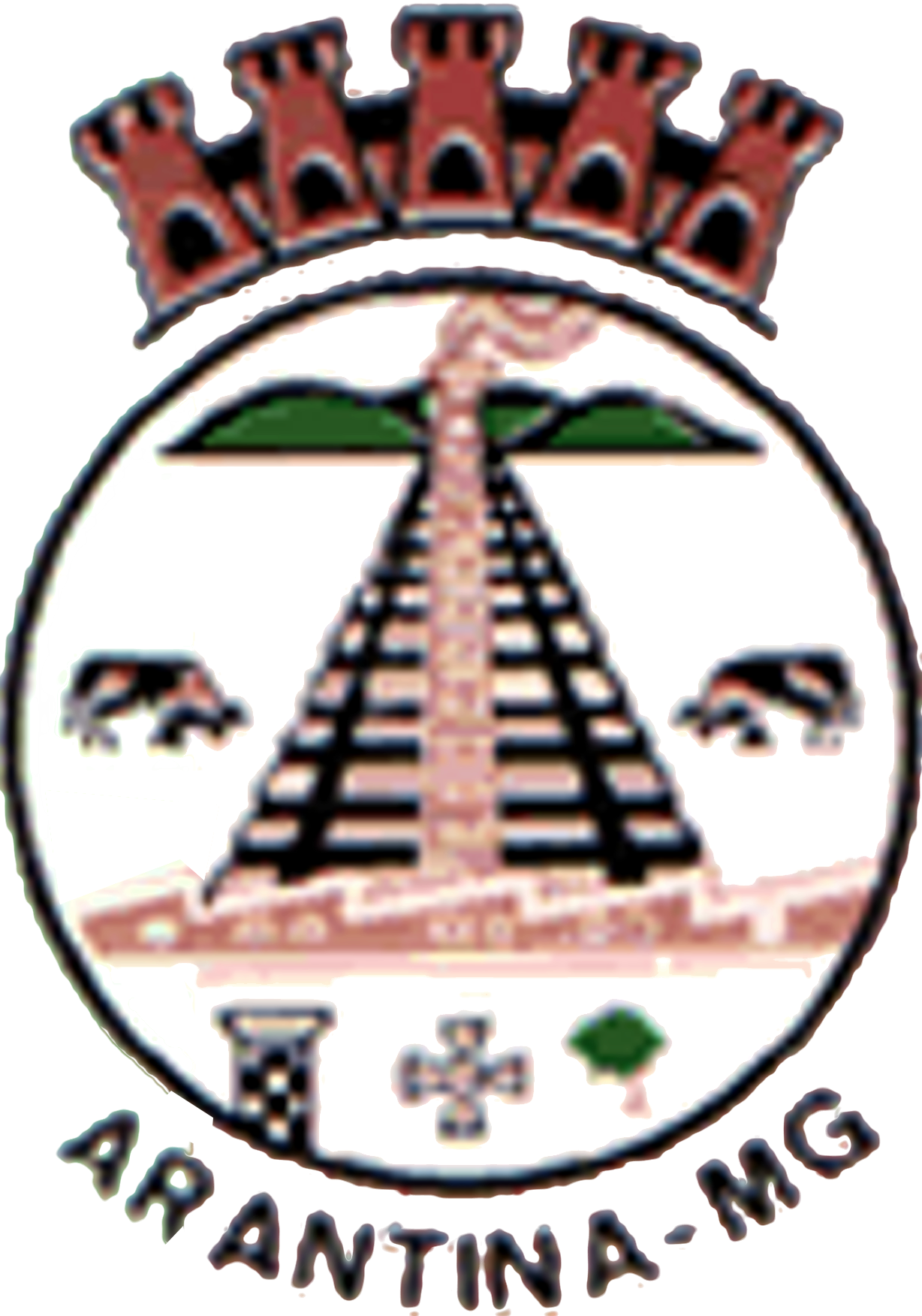
- Flag Coat of arms

- Location of Arantina within Minas Gerais

- Localization in Brazil
- Coordinates: 21°54′39″S 44°15′21″W
- Country: Brazil
- State: Minas Gerais
- Founded: 1 March 1963

Government
  - Type: Mayor
  - Mayor: Francisco Carlos Ferreira Alves (DEM)

Area
  - Total: 89.42 km^{2} (34.53 sq mi)
- Elevation: 1,050 m (3,440 ft)

Population (2020)
  - Total: 2,787
  - Density: 31.17/km^{2} (80.72/sq mi)
- Demonym: Arantes
- Time zone: UTC−3 (BRT)
- Postal Code: 37360-000 to 37369-999
- Website: www.arantina.mg.gov.br

Arantina is a Brazilian municipality located in the state of Minas Gerais. Its population as of 2020 is estimated to be 2,787 people living in a total area of 89.382 km^{2} (34.511 sq mi). The city belongs to the mesoregion of Sul and Sudoeste de Minas and to the microregion of Andrelândia.

The municipality has an average annual median temperature of 21.2 °C and the vegetation is predominantly that of the South American Atlantic Forest. With 98% of the population living within the urban area, the city had two health facilities in 2009. The Human Development Index (HDI) of the municipality is 0.736, considered average in relation to the state.

The settlement of the municipality first began in the second half of the 19th century, with the construction of a stretch of the Estrada de Ferro Oeste de Minas railway. Notable features of the municipality include the handcrafts it produces and annual events such as the Carnival of Arantina.

== History ==
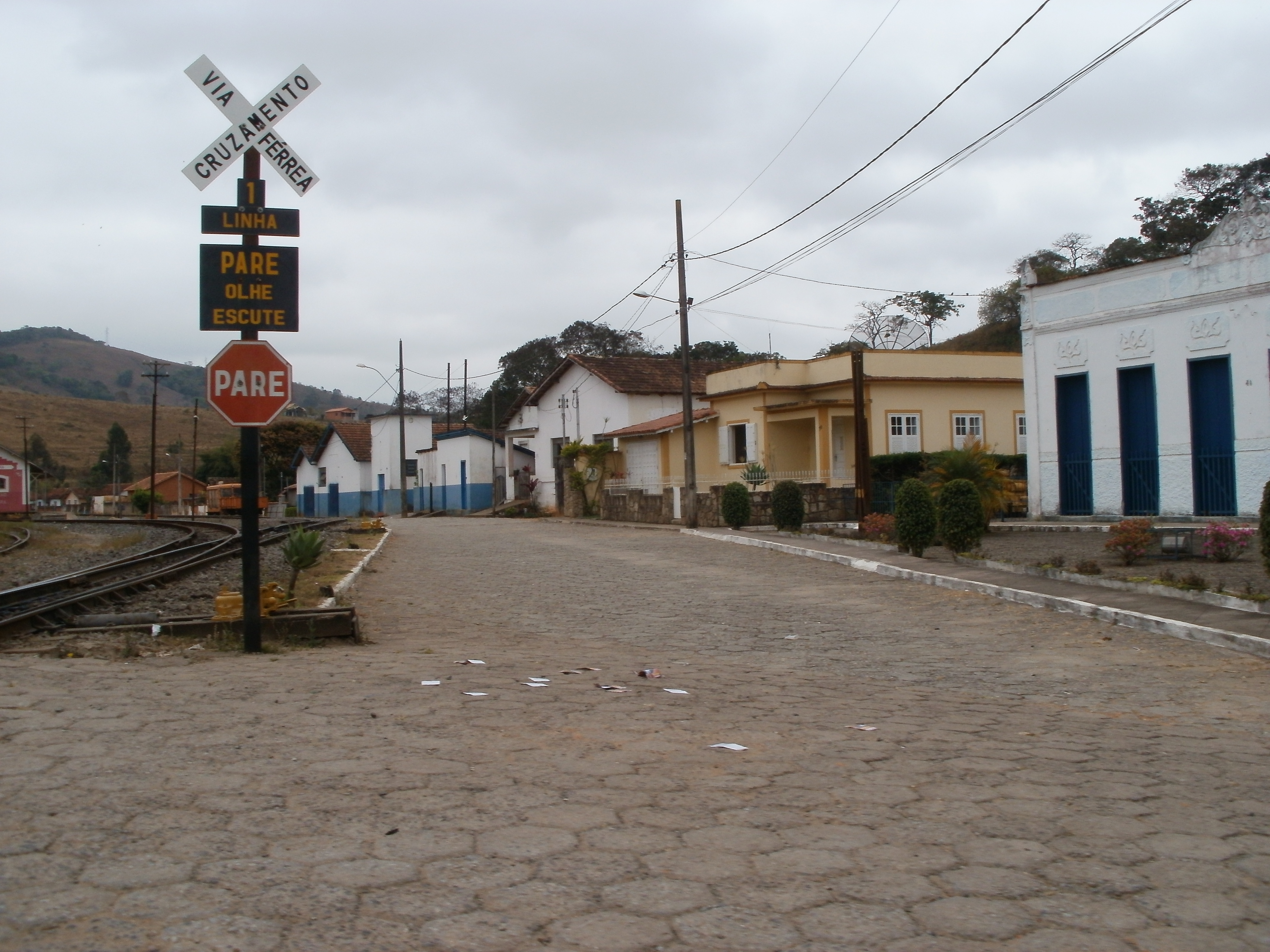
Level crossing in Arantina.

The area of the current municipality first began to be settled during the 19th century, when the Estrada de Ferro Oeste de Minas (EFOM) railroad was being constructed. The railroad was intended to link the south of Goiás state with the Angra dos Reis municipality in Rio de Janeiro state, passing through Barra Mansa, RJ and operating both passenger and cargo trains. In Arantina there was a junction between the EFOM line and the Barra Line (the name is derived from Barra do Piraí municipality), connecting Bom Jardim de Minas municipality to the Barra Mansa line, now defunct.

A small town emerged around the Arantes railway station, then situated in the municipality of Mantiqueira (today Bom Jardim de Minas). For several years the town that is today Arantina belonged to Bom Jardim de Minas. The town was known as Várzea do Paiol. In the current seat of the municipality there was a storehouse to store the corn harvested by farmer Juca Pereira, owner of much of the municipality's land.

The town consolidated itself with the manufacturing of ceramics. Given the economic growth, by state law no. 1058 of 31 December 1943, the district of Bom Jardim de Minas was created, which received its name from the railway station. Arantina was emancipated by state law no. 2764 of 30 December 1962, being officially incorporated on 1 March 1963.

== Geography ==
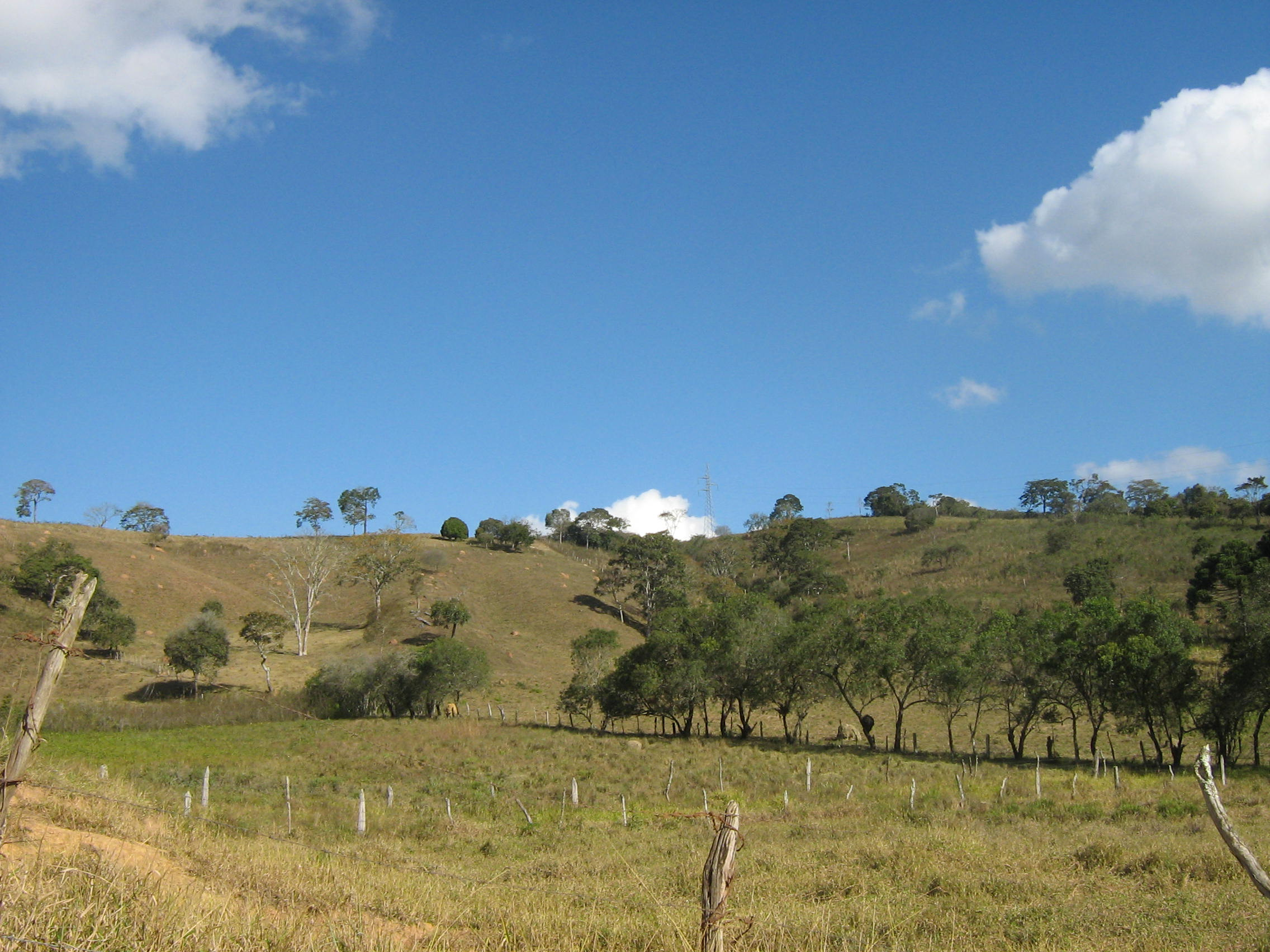
Hilly terrain in the rural zone.

The area of the municipality, according to the Brazilian Institute of Geography and Statistics (IBGE) is 89.42 km², with 0.3682 km² constituting the urban area. It is situated at a latitude of 21°54'40"S and a longitude of 44°15'21"W and is 323 km south of Belo Horizonte, the state capital of Minas Gerais. Its neighboring municipalities are Bom Jardim de Minas to the east, Andrelândia to the northwest, and Liberdade to the south.

According to the regional division of 2017, instituted by the IBGE, the municipality belongs to the Immediate and Intermediate Geographic Region of Juiz de Fora. Before this time, the municipality was included in the Microregion of Andrelândia and the Mesoregion of South and Southwest Minas.

=== Terrain and Hydrography ===
The terrain of the municipality of Arantina is predominantly hilly. Approximately 60% of the territory is covered in hilly areas, while about 30% is more mountainous, and the remaining 10% is generally flat. The highest elevation is 1,379 m found at the Serra do Caxambu and the lowest elevation is 1,030 m at the base level of the Capixingui stream in the Turvo Pequeno river. The central part of the town is at 1,050 m.

The territory is covered in various small rivers and streams, principally the Capixingui stream and the Turvo Pequeno river, making up part of the Rio Grande river basin. The Turvo Pequeno divides the municipality, and there are drainage projects for its sub-basin. Much of the water extracted from it is supplied to the towns of Arantina and Andrelândia.

=== Climate ===
The climate of Arantina is characterized, according to the IBGE, as tropical (type Cwb according to the Köppen climate classification). It has an average annual temperature of 21.2 °C with dry and cool winters and rainy summers with mild temperatures. The hottest month, January, has an average temperature of 24.1 °C, average high temperature of 29.4 °C and average low temperature of 18.9 °C. The coldest moth, July, has an average temperature of 17.3 °C, with 24.8 °C and 9.8 °C as the average high and low temperatures respectively. Autumn and spring are transitional seasons.

The average annual precipitation is 1412.9 mm, with August being the driest month when there is only 13.9 mm of rainfall. In December, the rainiest month, the average rainfall is 259.8 mm. In recent years, however, hot and dry days during the summer have become more frequent and it is not rare for the temperature to exceed 28 °C, especially between July and September. In August of 2010, for example, the precipitation in Arantina was 0 mm. During the dry season and long Indian summers in the rainy season, brush fires are commonly recorded in the hills, principally in the rural zone of the municipality, which contribute to deforestation and to the release of pollutants into the atmosphere, harming the quality of the air.

Climate data for Arantina
Month	Jan	Feb	Mar	Apr	May	Jun	Jul	Aug	Sep	Oct	Nov	Dec	Year
Mean daily maximum °C (°F)	29.4 (84.9)	29.4 (84.9)	29.4 (84.9)	27.6 (81.7)	25.8 (78.4)	24.8 (76.6)	24.8 (76.6)	26.0 (78.8)	26.8 (80.2)	27.5 (81.5)	28.2 (82.8)	28.5 (83.3)	27.3 (81.1)
Mean daily minimum °C (°F)	18.9 (66.0)	18.8 (65.8)	18.2 (64.8)	15.9 (60.6)	12.9 (55.2)	10.8 (51.4)	9.8 (49.6)	11.2 (52.2)	13.9 (57.0)	16.0 (60.8)	17.2 (63.0)	18.2 (64.8)	15.1 (59.2)
Average precipitation mm (inches)	248.6 (9.79)	223.2 (8.79)	173.2 (6.82)	66.5 (2.62)	37.1 (1.46)	22.5 (0.89)	14.7 (0.58)	13.9 (0.55)	51.6 (2.03)	118.0 (4.65)	183.8 (7.24)	259.8 (10.23)	1,412.9 (55.65)

=== Flora and Fauna ===
The vegetation of the town is divided into two classes of native ecological formations: the forest (Atlantic Forest) and the open clearings. Exotic vegetation and monocultures also occur. These classes, associated with the rugged topography, result in a diverse vegetation cover. In the Atlantic Forest, trees such as the Tabebuia, Brazilian rosewood, angico, manacá-da-serra, Brazilian pine, and cedar stand out.

== Demographics ==
Historical population
Year	Pop.	±%
1970	2,590	—
1980	2,911	+12.4%
1991	2,638	−9.4%
2000	2,906	+10.2%
2010	2,823	−2.9%
Est. 2018	2,804	−0.7%
Source: Brazilian Institute of Geography and Statistics

In 2010, the population of the municipality was calculated by the Instituto Brasileiro de Geografia e Estatística (IBGE) (Brazilian Institute of Geography and Statistics) to be 2,823 inhabitants. According to the census of that year, 1,415 inhabitants were men and 1,408 were women. Also according to the same census, 2,633 inhabitants lived in the urban zone and 190 in the rural zone. According to statistics divulged in 2018, the municipal population was 2,804 inhabitants.

In 2010, according to data from the IBGE census of that year, the racial composition of Arantina was 2,196 white (77.79%), 216 black (7.65%), 1 yellow (Asian) (0.04%), and 410 brown (multiracial) (14.52%). As for the region of birth, 18 were born in the Northeast Region (0.63%), 2,792 in the Southeast Region (98.91%), and 5 in the South Region (0.18%). 2,404 inhabitants were native to the State of Minas Gerais (90.3%) and, of this total, 1,382 were born in Arantina (48.96%). Among the 367 natives of other units of the federation, Rio de Janeiro was the state with the greatest presence at 270 people (9.58%). Following was São Paulo, with 60 residents (2.13%), and Espírito Santo with 6 residents (0.20%).

The Human Development Index (HDI) of Arantina is considered medium by the United Nations Development Programme (UNDP), being a value of 0.697 (the 240th highest in the state of Minas Gerais). Most of the town's indices are close to or above the national average according to the UNDP. The education index was 0.641, life expectancy was 0.834, and the median income was 0.633. According to the IBGE, in the year 2003, the Gini coefficient, which measures economic inequality, was 0.39, with 1.00 being the worst number and 0.00 being the best. In that year, the incidence of poverty as measured by the IBGE was 42.15% with the lower limit of the incidence of poverty being 29.79%, the higher limit of incidence being 27.35%, and the subjective incidence being 36.50%.

According to the data of the 2010 census released by the IBGE, the population of Arantina is composed of: 2,553 Catholics (90.42%), 214 Protestants (7.58%), 35 non-religious (1.24%), 7 spiritualists (0.26%), and 0.5% divided among other religions.

== Politics and Administration ==
The administration of the municipality is carried out by executive and legislative powers. The executive power is exercised by the Mayor, aided by his cabinet of secretaries. The current mayor of Arantina is Francisco Carlos Ferreira Alves, of the Democrats (DEM), elected in the municipal elections of 2016 with 52.14% of the vote and sworn in on 1 January 2017 with Deputy Mayor Adriano by his side. The legislative power, on the other hand, is constituted by the Municipal Chamber composed of nine Aldermen. It is up to this body to draft and vote on laws fundamental to administration and to the executive, especially the participatory budget.

In addition to the legislative process and secretary work, there are also active municipal councils, among which are the rights of children and adolescents (created in 1995) and guardianship (2005). Arantina is governed by its organic law, which was enacted on 18 March 1990, and is a term of the district of Andrelândia of the state judiciary first jurisdiction. The municipality possessed, in February 2019, 2,560 voters according to the Tribunal Superior Eleitoral (TSE) (Superior Electoral Court), which represents 0.016% of the Minas Gerais electorate.

== See also ==
- List of municipalities in Minas Gerais
