= Belmiro Braga =

City in Minas Gerais, Brazil

Coordinates: 21°57′S 43°25′W

- Municipality
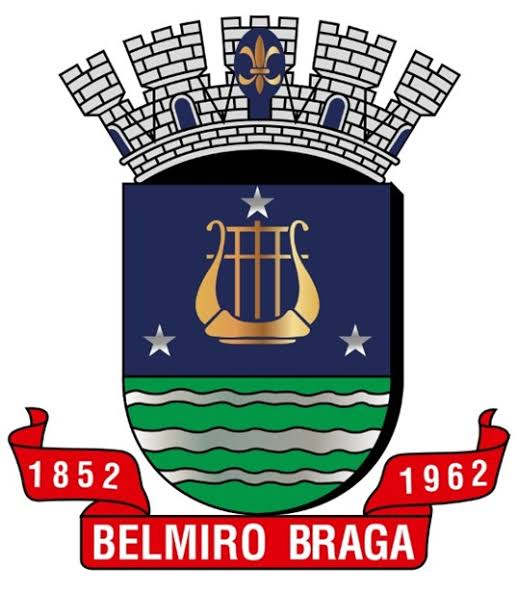
- Flag Coat of arms
- Interactive map of Belmiro Braga
- Country: Brazil
- State: Minas Gerais
- Region: Southeast
- Time zone: UTC−3 (BRT)

Location of Belmiro Braga within Minas Gerais

Belmiro Braga is a city in the Brazilian state of Minas Gerais, close to the border with Rio de Janeiro state. It was emancipated from Juiz de Fora in 1962. As of 2020, the estimated population was 3,425 inhabitants.

== Geography ==
The municipality is located 295 km (by road) from the capital, Belo Horizonte.

=== Highways ===
- BR-040
- MG-353

=== Climate ===
The average annual temperature around 19 °C (66 °F), with a mean minimum of 14 °C (57 °F) and a mean maximum of 24 °C (75 °F). The municipality is in the basin of the Paraíba do Sul river.

== Demographics ==
- Total Population : 3425
- Urban: 950
- Rural: 2477
- Men: 1734
- Women: 1693
- (Source: AMM )
- Population density (inhabitants per km^{2}): 8.7
- Infant mortality up to 1 year (per thousand): 24.1
- Life expectancy (years): 71.6
- Fertility rate (children per woman): 2.9
- Literacy Rate : 83.4%

(Source: UNDP / 2000)

== See also ==
- List of municipalities in Minas Gerais
