= Chácaras =

Type of castanets from the Canary Islands

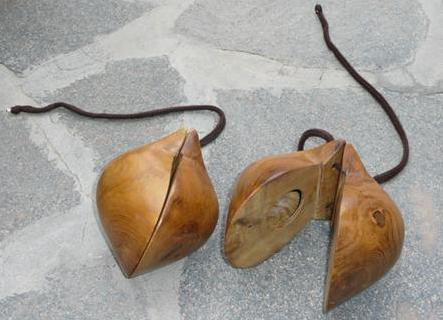
A set of chácaras

Chácaras are a type of castanets from the Canary Islands. They are an idiophonic and chattering instrument, with an interior cavity. It is typically made of moral wood.

Chácaras are used in the traditional music of the islands of El Hierro and La Gomera, the latter being bigger than the hands of the player. They are often accompanied by tambor drums and chanting, and by dancers performing the baile de tambor (drum dance).

When playing, a pair of chácaras is held in each hand, secured by the cord, and the hands are shaken. The macho (male) chácara, with a deeper sound, held in one hand, sets the rhythm, and the hembra (female) chácara, in the other hand, is the one that chimes.

In the other islands there are similar smaller instruments, but they are called castañuelas (castanets).

Despite not appearing in the archaeological record, etymological analysis suggests a pre-colonial Guanche origin for this instrument, its name possibly related to Berber words such as šakar, meaning "hoof".
