= Santos Dumont, Minas Gerais =

Santos Dumont
- Municipality
- Municipality of Santos Dumont
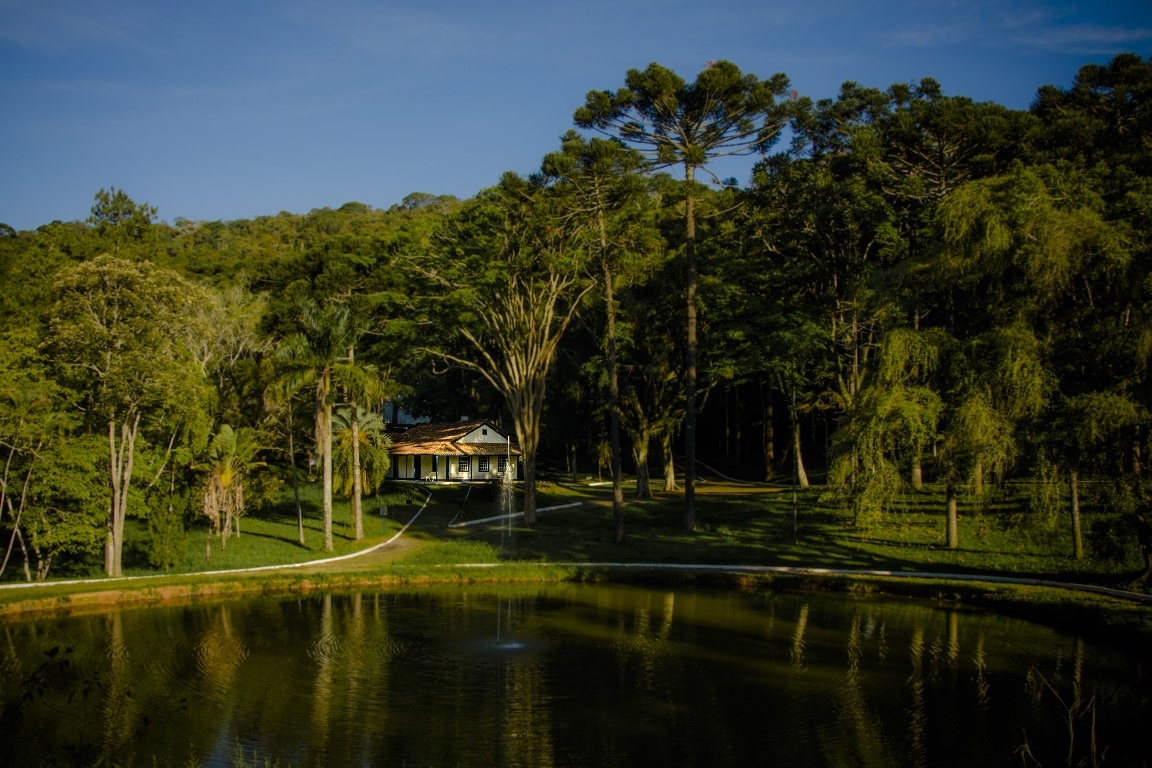

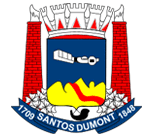
- Flag Coat of arms
- Nickname: Terra do Pai da Aviação
- Location in Brazil
- Coordinates: 21°27′S 43°33′W
- Country: Brazil
- Region: Southeast
- State: Minas Gerais
- Founded: July 27, 1889

Government
  - Mayor: Carlos Alberto de Azevedo
- Elevation: 839 m (2,753 ft)

Population (2020)
  - Total: 46,421
- Time zone: UTC−3 (BRT)
- Postal Code: 36240-000
- HDI (2010): 0.741 – high
- Website: www.santosdumont.mg.gov.br

Santos Dumont (formerly known as Palmira) is a municipality in southern Minas Gerais state, Brazil. The population (2020) is estimated to be 46,421 and the total area of the municipality is 639.1 km^{2} (246.8 mi^{2}). It lies at an elevation of 839 m (2,753 ft) just off the main interstate highway, BR040, between the urban centers of Barbacena (north) and Juiz de Fora (south). It is 240 km (150 mi) from the state capital, Belo Horizonte, and 220 km (140 mi) from Rio de Janeiro. It became a city in 1889.

== Geography ==
=== Climate ===
The average annual temperature is approximately 20 °C (68 °F), with the average maximum of 21 °C (70 °F), and the average minimum of 19 °C (66 °F).

== Economy ==
=== Agriculture ===
Livestock raising is the main economic activity with approximately 30,000 head of cattle and an annual production of milk of about 15,000,000 L (3,300,000 imp gal).

The region produces corn, strawberries, guava, nectaries, manioc, beans, oranges, coffee, peach and banana.

=== Industry ===
Santos Dumont has the Companhia Brasileira de Carbureto de Cálcio, (CBCC), which produces silicone iron and metallic silicone, exporting to several countries.

== History ==
Prior 1889 it was known as Freguesia de São Miguel e Almas de João Gomes, from 1889 to 1932 it was known as Palmyra. In 1932 it was renamed Santos Dumont in honour of aviation pioneer Alberto Santos-Dumont, who was born in the Cabangu fazenda nearby the city. The Cabangu museum, located 16 km (9.9 mi) from the centre of the city (21°25′32″S 43°40′27″W) is dedicated to his memory. It is located in the house where he was born and has personal objects, photos and an aviation museum.

== Demographics ==
Since the 1980s the municipality has been experiencing a period of slight demographic standstill. Between the census held in 1996 and the census held in 2000 the population increased at the rate of 0.32% per annum which is much lower than other places in the country. This is partially explained by the economic attraction of the nearby city of Juiz de Fora, making it the destination of many immigrants.

According to the 2000 census, the average income of the workers of the municipality was calculated at R$450 (237 USD at that time), but workers earning less than the national minimum wage (R$151, 80 USD) accounted for 38.8% of the total employees, meanwhile only 1.00% of them earned more than the equivalent to 20 minimum wages (R$3,020 or 1,590 USD).

== Tourism ==
Santos Dumont has a rich tourism. It includes the Estrada Real (Royal Road, a set of colonial-era roads in Brazil), associated to an ecological tourism. There are 10 Kilometers of road until the division with the town of Antônio Carlos. During the route, it is possible to observe a nice natural landscape, old farms and two fountains, from the time of their construction, also well some rock records. Theses fountains were used for a parade of drovers while came from the interior of Minas Gerais, bringing gold to Rio de Janeiro, at the time of Colonial Brazil.

Besides that, in the city stand out the Cabangu Museum birthplace of Alberto Santos Dumont, in the district of Mantiqueira, 16 km from the city center.

The Ponte Preta Dam, in the neighborhood of Ponte Preta, allows leisure activities where people go swimming, boating, fishing, camping and spending the day free for leisure. From September to January, the dam is empty, but on-site leisure activities are possible such as campgrounds and events like “Off Road”.

== Sports ==
The local football club, Mineiro Futebol Clube play in a small stadium north of the city center.

== See also ==
- List of municipalities in Minas Gerais
