= Juiz de Fora =

- Municipality
- Municipality of Juiz de Fora
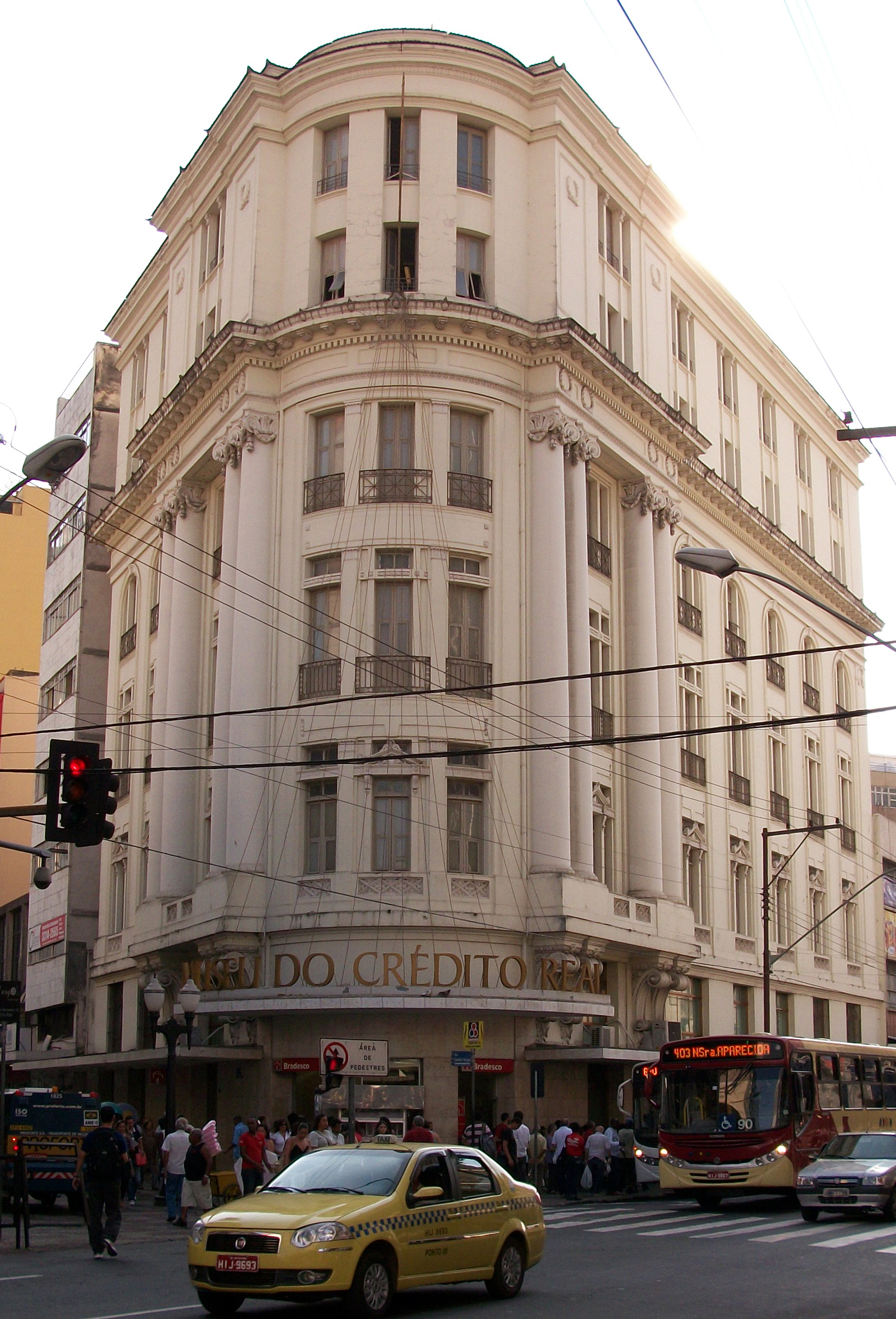
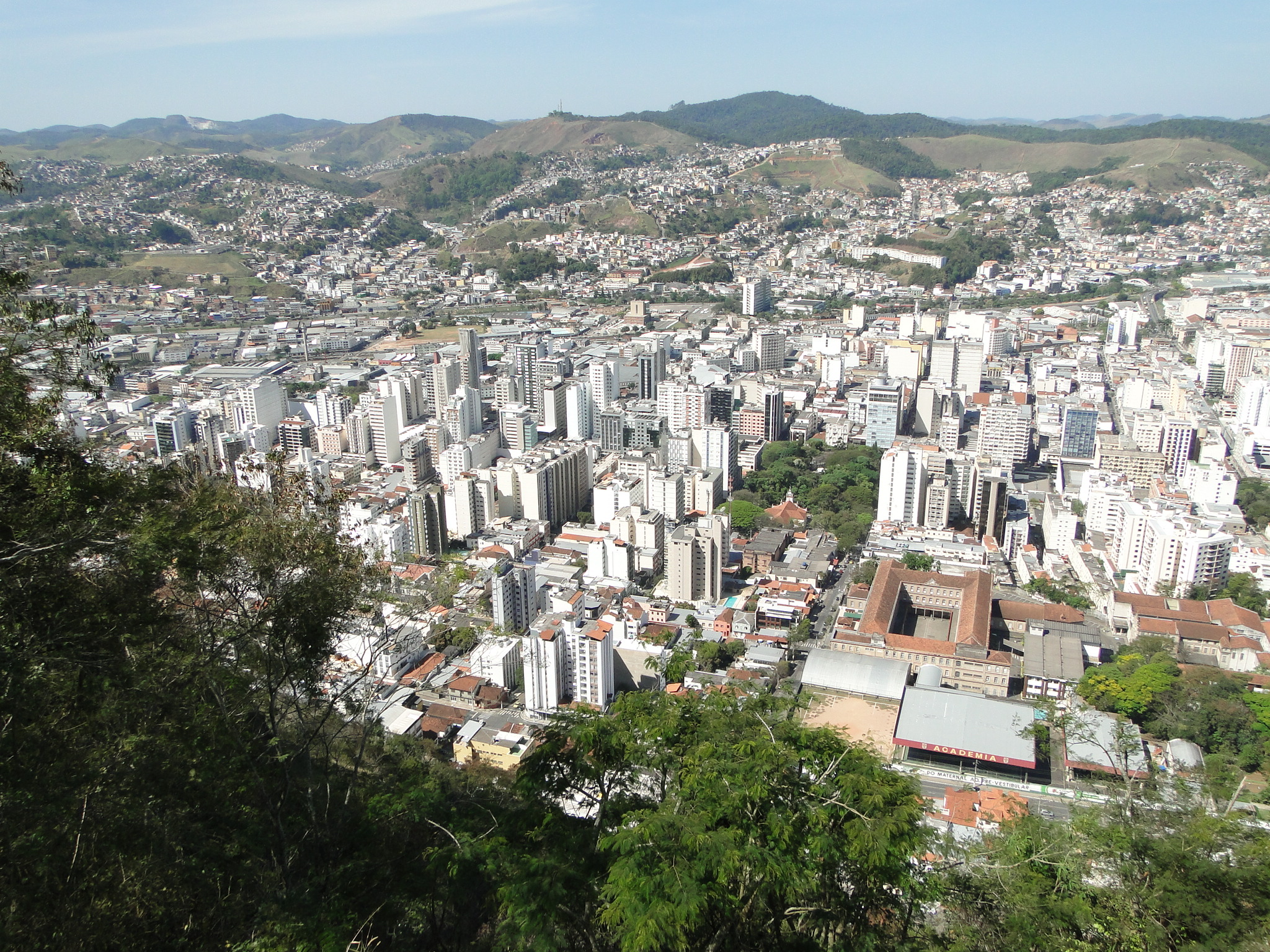
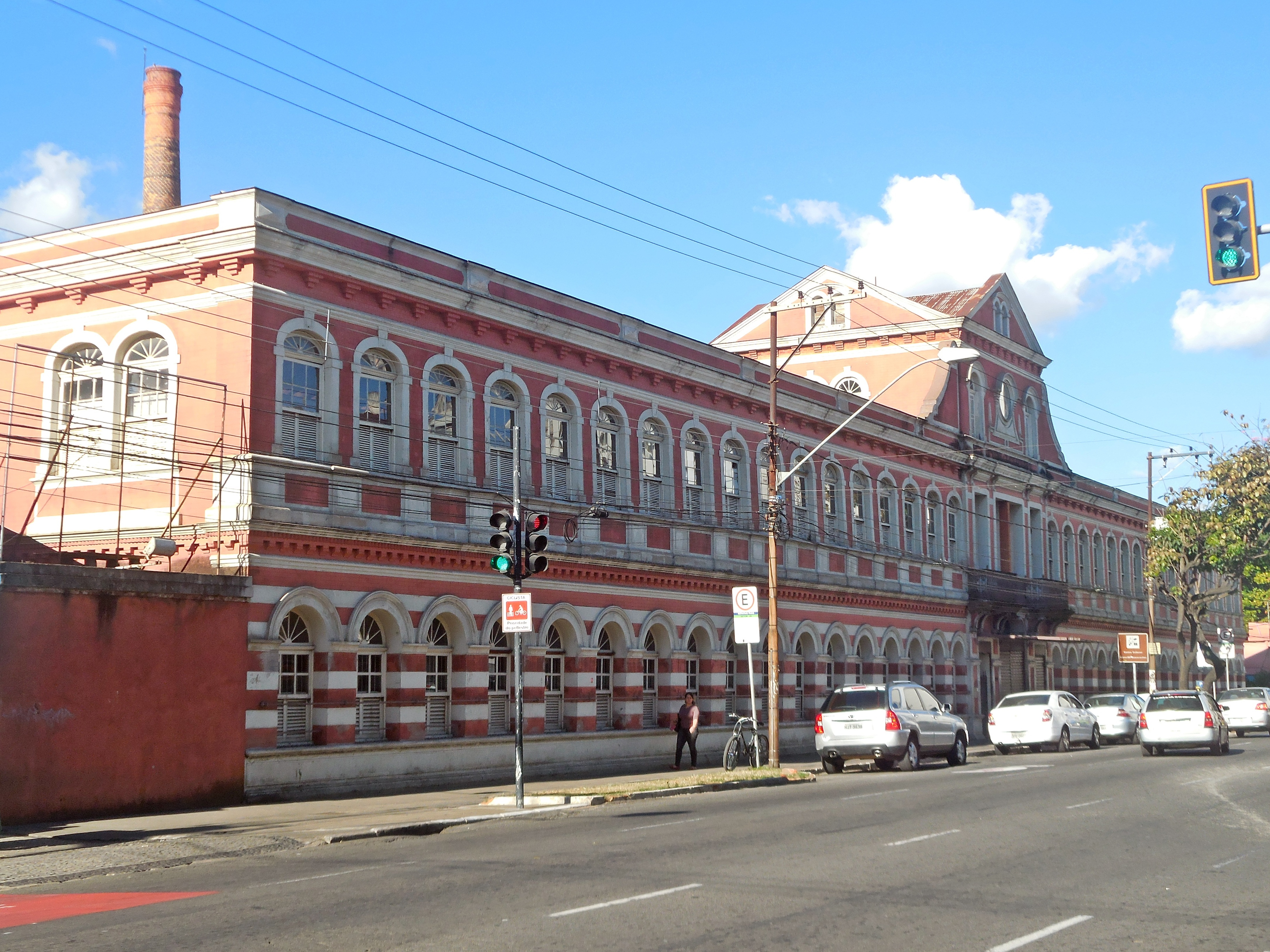
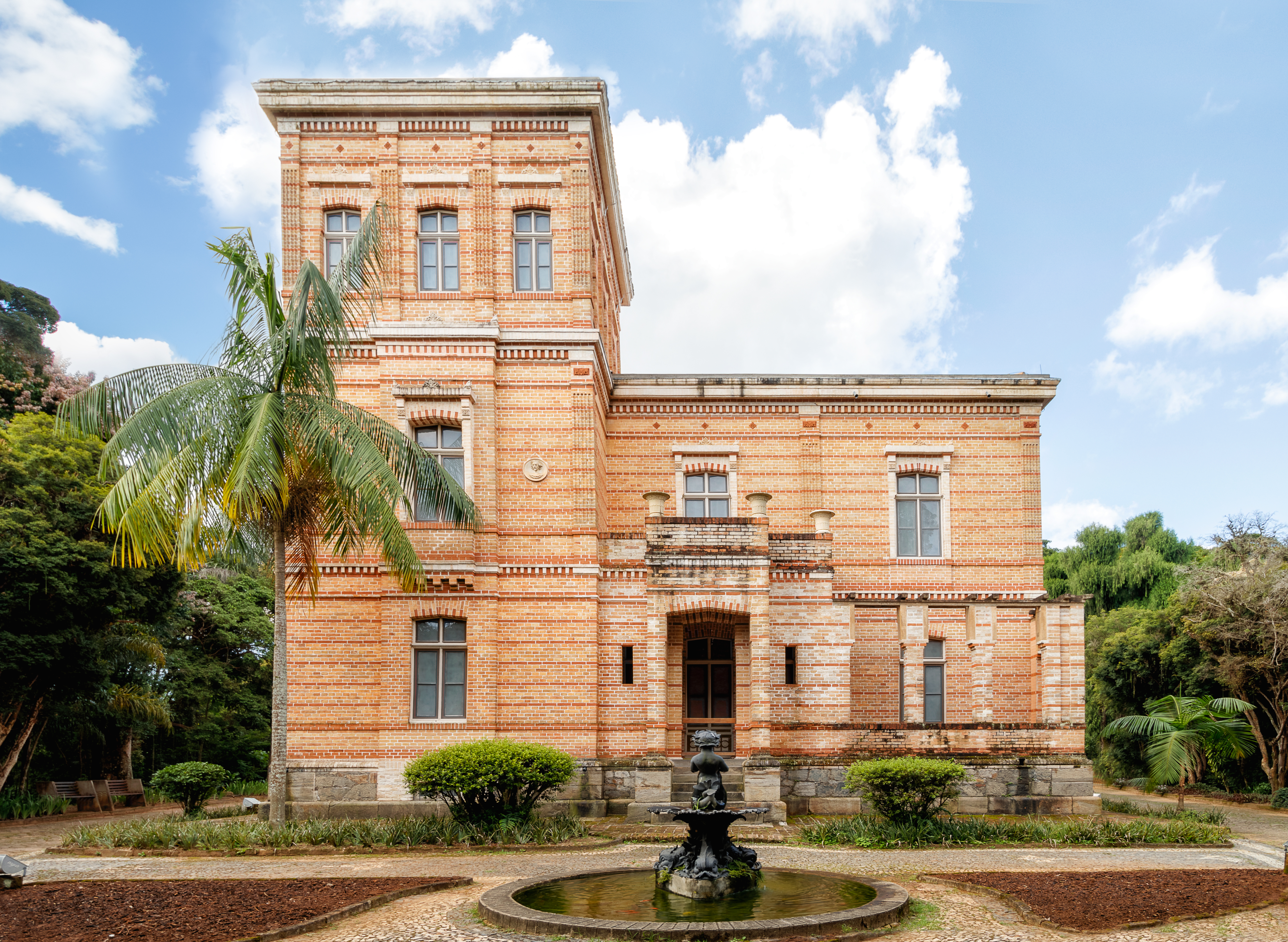
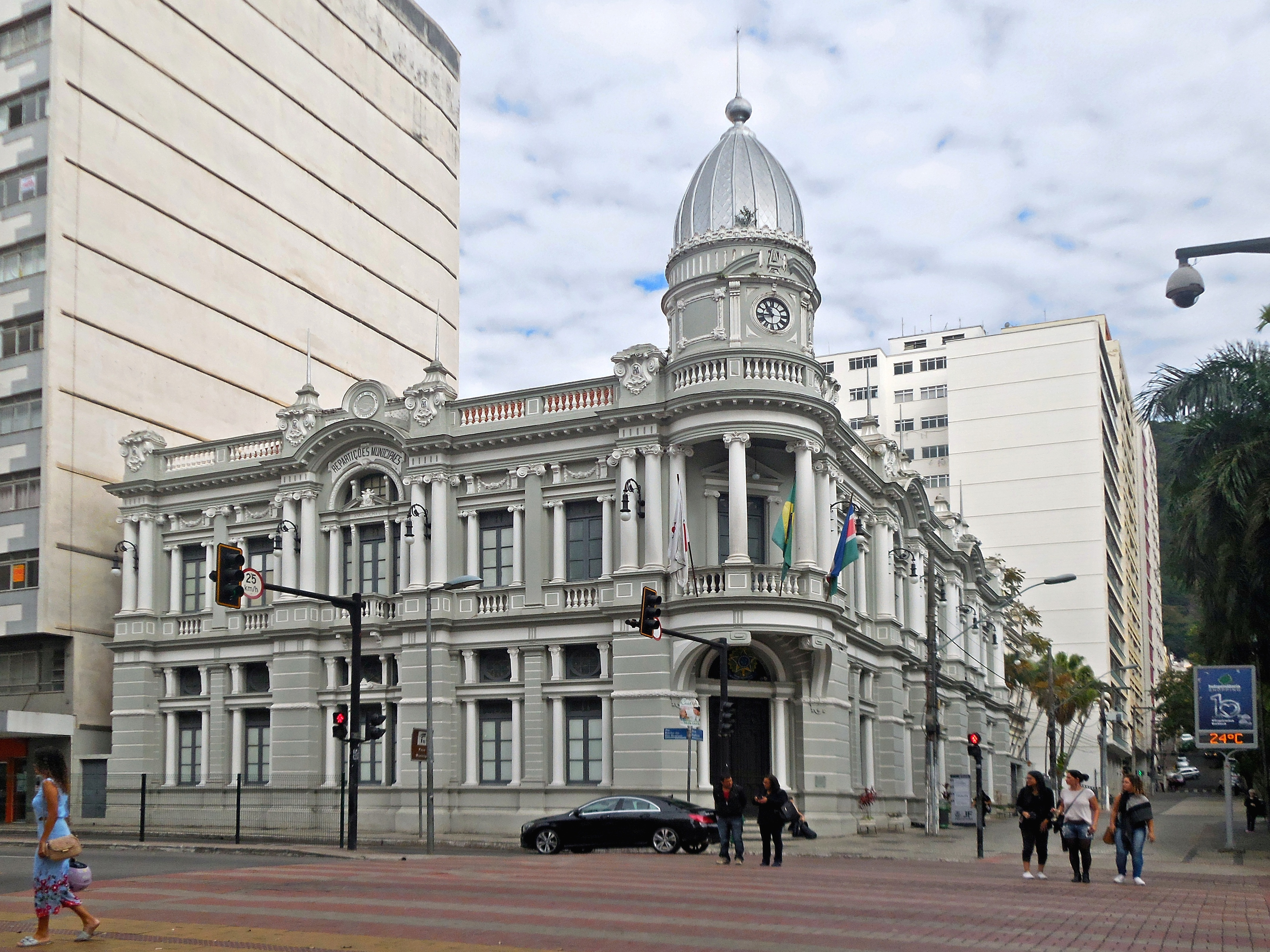
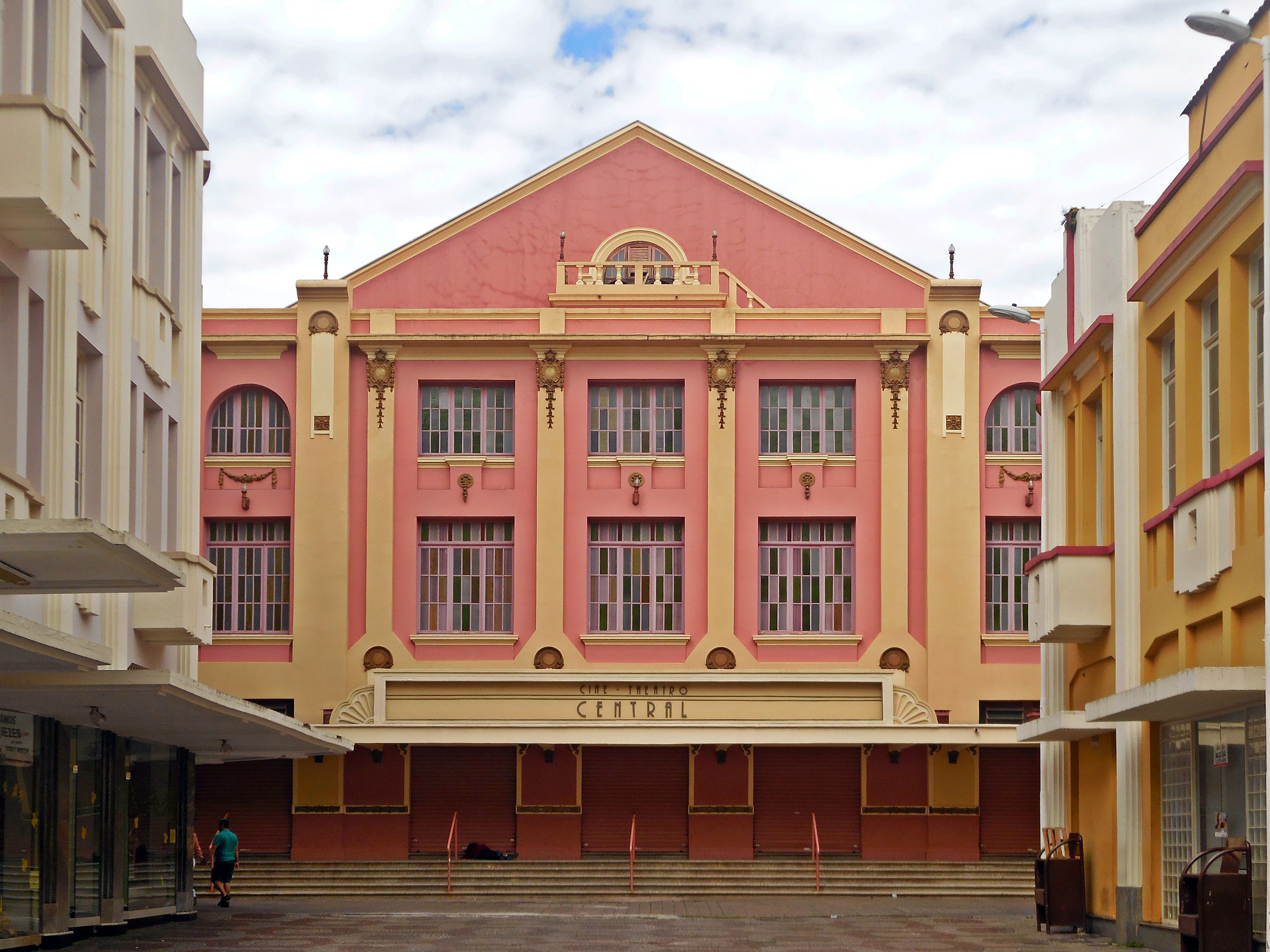
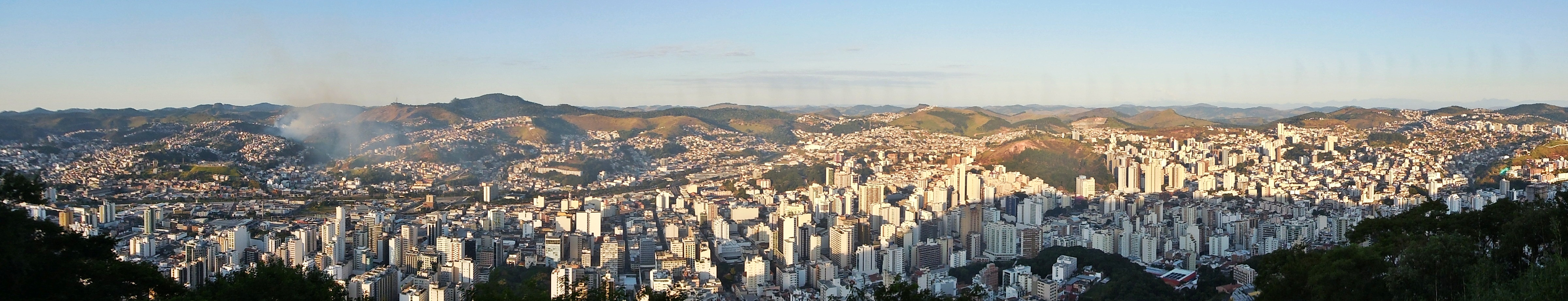

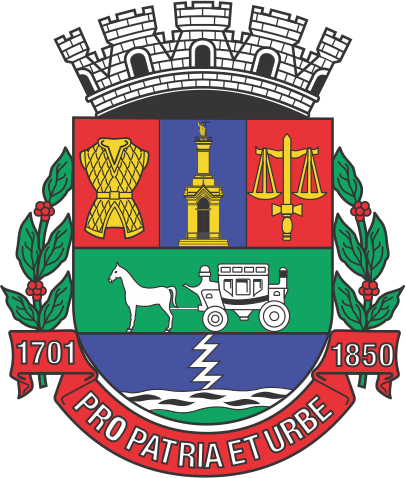
- Flag Coat of arms
- Nickname: JF
- Motto(s): Pro Patria et Urbe "For the homeland and the city"

- Location of Juiz de Fora, Minas Gerais, Brazil
- Coordinates: 21°45′43″S 43°20′58″W
- Country: Brazil
- Region: Southeast
- State: Minas Gerais
- Incorporated: 30 May 1850

Government
  - Mayor: Margarida Salomão (PT)

Area
  - Total: 1,436 km^{2} (554 sq mi)
- Elevation: 678 m (2,224 ft)

Population (2022)
  - Total: 540,756
  - Density: 376.64/km^{2} (975.5/sq mi)
- Time zone: UTC-3 (UTC-3)
  - Summer (DST): UTC-2 (UTC-2)
- Postal Code: 36000-000
- Area code: +55 32
- HDI (2010): 0.778 – high
- Website: www.pjf.mg.gov.br

Juiz de Fora (Brazilian Portuguese pronunciation: [ˈʒwiz dʒi ˈfɔɾɐ]; lit. 'Outsider Judge'), also known as J.F., is a city in the southeastern Brazilian state of Minas Gerais, approximately 40 kilometres (25 mi) from the state border with Rio de Janeiro. As of the 2022 census the population was 540,756. The geographical area of the municipality is 1,437 km^{2} (555 sq mi).

The city's location was a key factor in its economic and demographic development since it is situated between the three most important financial and economic metropolises of southeast Brazil (and also the three largest urban sprawls of the country): Rio de Janeiro (189 km (117 mi)), Belo Horizonte (260 km (160 mi)) and São Paulo (486 km (302 mi)). Major highways connect Juiz de Fora with these three metropolitan areas. The most important is the BR 040 which connects Brasília with Rio de Janeiro via Belo Horizonte. The city is built on the Paraibuna, a major tributary of the Paraíba do Sul river.

== History ==
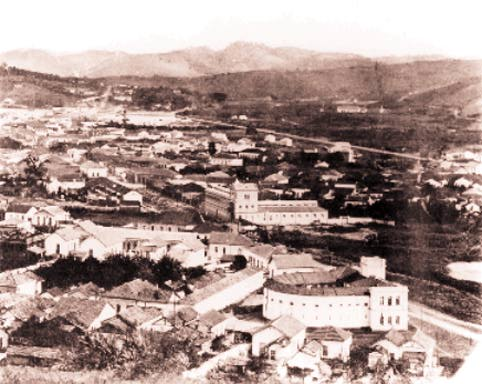
Juiz de Fora in 1893.

The origins of Juiz de Fora can be traced back to the beginnings of the 18th century, when the Caminho Novo (New Way) road was opened linking Rio de Janeiro to the gold rush area of Minas Gerais around Vila Rica (now Ouro Preto). The region was covered with dense forest (hence its name; "Zona da Mata", Forest Zone). Despite the opening of the new route the area remained largely uninhabited and most of its scarce settlement was centered on the road itself. The first permanent inhabitants of the municipality were merchants and farmers who supplied the travelers' needs on the long road between the coast and the gold region.

Further development would only take place after the decline of gold mining in the central zone of Minas Gerais. The capital previously invested in the mines was now invested in coffee plantations, and the region of Zona da Mata became a fertile ground to invest in. The position of the village then called Santo Antônio do Paraibuna was favourable due to the road connection with the capital of the country and its harbour.

In 1850 the small village was officially elevated to city status. Progress continued in 1861 with the completion of the first macadamized road in Latin America, the Estrada União e Indústria (Union and Industry), replacing the Caminho Novo. Its name reflected the newfound wealth of the city, for industry replaced coffee-related agriculture as its economic heart. Five years later a new railway, the Estrada de Ferro Dom Pedro II, reached the city and in 1889 the first hydroelectric powerplant of Latin America (Marmelos Zero) was built on the Paraibuna river on the outskirts of the city along the Estrada União e Indústria.

As both foreign and domestic capital fueled the industrial boom the city became a major centre (becoming the largest urban area of the state). By first decade of the 20th century Juiz de Fora was among the main textile and industrial producers in South America and in Brazil particularly. The city's wealth was second only to major cities such as São Paulo and Rio de Janeiro. But as the coffee rush frontier moved southwestwards it reached the state of São Paulo and its immensely fertile plateaus which became the richest in the federation and industry flourished there as it had in Juiz de Fora itself. The city of Juiz de Fora became the major industrial centre in a state that was being much surpassed by São Paulo in industrial output, and worse still much of the wealth generated by the state (a large bulk by Juiz de Fora itself) was being used in the building of the new state capital Belo Horizonte (replacing Ouro Preto at the centre of the gold region), founded at the end of the 19th century and which, in the Brazilian and Latin-American tradition of centralization, was intended to be the largest city of the state. The Great Depression of the 1930s worsened the city's decay which would only be overcome five decades later. By the 1940s the city had lost its nationwide influence due to the continued growth of Belo Horizonte and the loss of industry.

The city's decay can be seen in the figures for its population which remained stagnant from the early 1930s to the late 1960s. By the mid-1970s, the city started to experience new growth, which continues to this day. This new era began with the establishment of a federal university (UFJF) in the city and the decision by the Brazilian military junta (1964–1985) to promote the city as a major military centre. This sparked a phenomenon rarely experienced by post-industrial towns: the industrial rebirth of the city, this time following Brazilian industrialization itself, based on heavy-industry such as steel and engineering.

Recently, the city seems to be experiencing a new era in its history, again following a boom in Brazilian economy, and is reinventing itself as a major centre for services (such as telecommunications, with an important call centre) and education (following the federal university, private colleges have been established in the city).

Today Juiz de Fora is an important commercial centre for the surrounding region and is the core of an unofficial metropolitan area of more than 1 million inhabitants.

== Geography ==
According to the modern (2017) geographic classification by Brazil's National Institute of Geography and Statistics (IBGE), the city is the main municipality in the Intermediate Geographic Region of Juiz de Fora.

=== Location ===
Juiz de Fora is located in southeast of Minas Gerais state. It is in a strategic location close to the important metropolitan areas of Rio de Janeiro, Belo Horizonte and São Paulo and on the main route from Rio de Janeiro to Belo Horizonte and Brasília. The distance of Juiz de Fora to important cities is:

- Rio de Janeiro: 184 kilometres (114 mi)
- Belo Horizonte: 272 kilometres (169 mi)
- São Paulo: 506 kilometres (314 mi)
- Vitória: 519 kilometres (322 mi)
- Brasília: 992 kilometres (616 mi)

=== Hydrography ===
The municipality of Juiz de Fora is located in the Middle Paraibuna Basin, part of the Paraíba do Sul River basin, and its urban perimeter is drained by 156 sub-basins of various sizes. The main rivers that flow through the municipality are the Paraibuna, its tributaries the Cágado and Peixe Rivers, and the Monte Verde and Grão-Mogol rivers, tributaries of the Peixe River. The Paraibuna River receives the untreated discharge of domestic sewage and industrial effluents produced in the city.

The Middle Paraibuna Basin has tributaries with relatively steep longitudinal profiles, which flow into the main river at a somewhat low gradient. The Paraibuna River has a fairly variable average slope throughout its course, with a moderate slope of approximately 1.0 m/km in the urban area of Juiz de Fora. The latest straightening of approximately 30 km, in the Industrial District I region, was designed to accommodate the regulating function of the recently completed Chapéu D'Uvas Dam. The dam was built to mitigate flooding and increase the city's water supply potential.

=== Climate ===
Although lying within tropical latitudes the climate is relatively mild. The altitude of 700 to 900 m (2,300 to 3,000 ft) makes the weather usually cooler and rainier than the lower surrounding areas. Under the Köppen climate classification Juiz de Fora's climate is classified as a humid subtropical climate with two distinct seasons, one hotter and rainier (October to April) and one cooler and drier (May to September). The average annual temperature is around 19 °C (66 °F) with an average high of 24 °C (75 °F) and an average low of 15 °C (59 °F). It is very humid with average humidity of 80%. The annual rainfall varies between 1,300 and 1,500 mm (51 and 59 in).

Climate data for Juiz de Fora (1991–2020 normals, extremes 1961–present)
Month	Jan	Feb	Mar	Apr	May	Jun	Jul	Aug	Sep	Oct	Nov	Dec	Year
Record high °C (°F)	36.0 (96.8)	36.2 (97.2)	33.6 (92.5)	31.7 (89.1)	30.7 (87.3)	30.4 (86.7)	31.0 (87.8)	34.3 (93.7)	35.8 (96.4)	37.4 (99.3)	36.8 (98.2)	35.4 (95.7)	37.4 (99.3)
Mean daily maximum °C (°F)	27.3 (81.1)	28.0 (82.4)	26.9 (80.4)	25.4 (77.7)	22.7 (72.9)	22.2 (72.0)	22.3 (72.1)	23.3 (73.9)	24.4 (75.9)	25.4 (77.7)	25.3 (77.5)	26.7 (80.1)	25.0 (77.0)
Daily mean °C (°F)	21.8 (71.2)	22.1 (71.8)	21.3 (70.3)	20.0 (68.0)	17.6 (63.7)	16.9 (62.4)	16.7 (62.1)	17.3 (63.1)	18.5 (65.3)	19.6 (67.3)	19.9 (67.8)	21.2 (70.2)	19.4 (66.9)
Mean daily minimum °C (°F)	18.1 (64.6)	18.2 (64.8)	17.7 (63.9)	16.4 (61.5)	14.1 (57.4)	13.2 (55.8)	12.8 (55.0)	13.1 (55.6)	14.3 (57.7)	15.5 (59.9)	16.2 (61.2)	17.5 (63.5)	15.6 (60.1)
Record low °C (°F)	12.0 (53.6)	11.6 (52.9)	10.6 (51.1)	7.9 (46.2)	4.4 (39.9)	3.1 (37.6)	3.3 (37.9)	4.8 (40.6)	5.0 (41.0)	8.6 (47.5)	7.7 (45.9)	10.3 (50.5)	3.1 (37.6)
Average precipitation mm (inches)	297.4 (11.71)	170.3 (6.70)	207.5 (8.17)	78.5 (3.09)	38.6 (1.52)	17.3 (0.68)	14.4 (0.57)	18.8 (0.74)	57.8 (2.28)	117.6 (4.63)	236.2 (9.30)	310.4 (12.22)	1,564.8 (61.61)
Average precipitation days (≥ 1.0 mm)	15.8	11.0	13.1	6.8	4.6	2.9	2.5	3.0	5.9	9.9	14.9	17.0	107.4
Average relative humidity (%)	81.4	79.1	82.2	81.9	81.8	80.6	77.6	73.8	74.3	77.5	83.3	82.9	79.7
Average dew point °C (°F)	18.9 (66.0)	18.9 (66.0)	18.7 (65.7)	17.3 (63.1)	15.0 (59.0)	14.0 (57.2)	13.1 (55.6)	13.0 (55.4)	14.3 (57.7)	16.0 (60.8)	17.4 (63.3)	18.6 (65.5)	16.3 (61.3)
Mean monthly sunshine hours	150.7	162.2	146.9	154.8	160.2	166.1	184.5	182.5	145.3	136.7	118.0	142.8	1,850.7
Source 1: NOAA
Source 2: Instituto Nacional de Meteorologia

== Economy ==
Juiz de Fora is the third most important industrial center in the state of Minas Gerais, despite being the fourth largest in terms of population. It was once the state's largest city, a position which was held up until the beginning of the 20th century (it held the second position until the 1980s). There are important steel mills and automotive factories (Mercedes-Benz being the most famous) in the city, along with several textile factories.

The city is also an important trade center with a considerable area of influence, being considered the capital of the Zona da Mata region of the state. It has four big shopping malls, several hyper-marts and many smaller shops.

== Transport ==
=== Major Roads ===
- BR-040, linking JF to north–south cities in the middle part of the states of Minas Gerais and Rio de Janeiro, such as Belo Horizonte, Congonhas, Conselheiro Lafaiete, Barbacena, Santos Dumont, Sete Lagoas, Três Rios, Petrópolis, Rio de Janeiro and Brasília.
- BR-267, linking JF to east–west cities in the southern part of Minas Gerais, such as Leopoldina, Bicas, Lima Duarte, Bom Jardim de Minas, Liberdade and Caxambu.
- MG-353, linking JF to southwest and northeast in the southern part of Minas Gerais, such as Rio Preto, Santa Bárbara do Monte Verde, Coronel Pacheco, Goianá, Rio Novo, Guarani and Piraúba.
- AMG-3085, Linking the BR-040 to the MG-353 and being used as a connection to get to the Itamar Franco Airport. It is also an important way to get to the borough Reprêsa.

=== Railways ===
- MRS Logística. Freight only.

=== Airports ===
- Francisco Álvares de Assis Airport, known popularly as "Serrinha", located within the city limits, approximately 7 km (4.3 mi) to the southwest of the centre in the district of "Aeroporto". Currently, the airport doesn't have any operation of commercial flights.

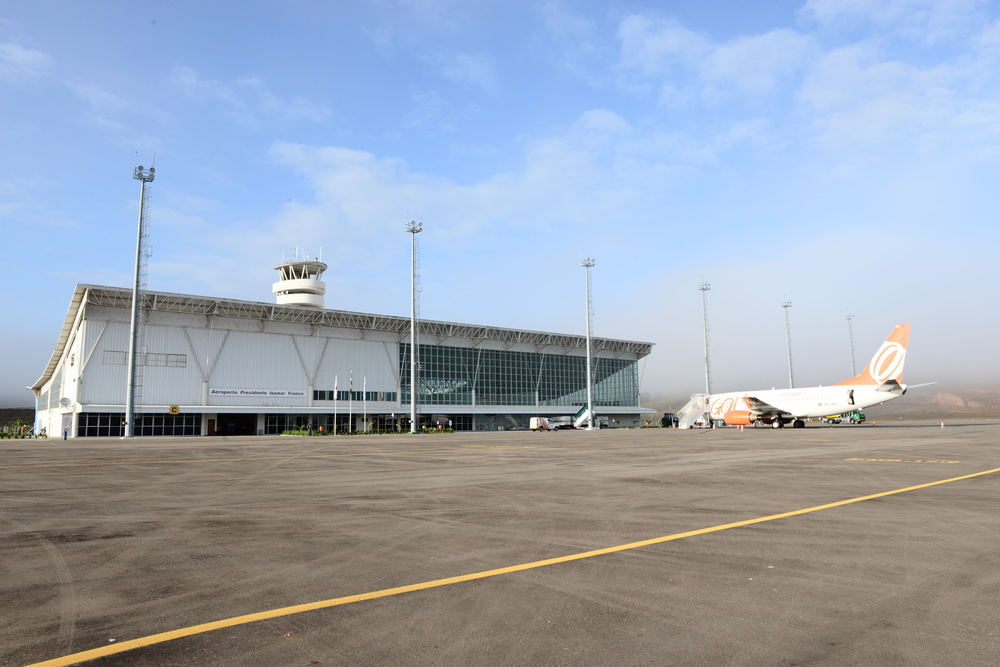
Itamar Franco Airport

- Pres. Itamar Franco Airport located 35 km (22 mi) north in the municipality of Goianá. Azul Linhas Áereas Brasileiras operates flights to Campinas (VCP) and GOL Linhas Áereas Inteligentes to Belo Horizonte (PLU) and São Paulo-Congonhas (CGH).

== Culture ==
The presence of immigrants – especially from Portugal, Italy, Germany, Syria and Lebanon and more recently China – throughout its history has given the city a cosmopolitan spirit and diverse cuisine. Typical German, Italian, Arabic, Portuguese and Oriental restaurantes, as well as traditional Brazilian cuisine, can be found at the prominent Rio Branco Avenue.

Juiz de Fora is an important regional cultural center, one of the few towns in south-east Minas Gerais to have permanently functional cinemas, theatres, music venues and light entertainment. There is a nationally important museum (Museu Mariano Procópio) and a Philharmonic Orchestra (Orquestra Filarmônica Pró-Musica). The city also hosts a yearly classical music festival, the Festival Internacional de Música Brasileira Colonial e Música Antiga (International Festival of Brazilian Colonial Music and Early Music). It is home to the "Meninos Cantores da Academia" the second oldest choir in this category in Brazil and to the Coral Universitário da Universidade Federal de Juiz de Fora an eclectic and neat choir with a remarkable musical legacy of 50 years in the city. Cultural life is also boosted by many cinema, gastronomic and rock festivals like: "Primeiro Plano Juiz de fora Cinema Festival", "JF Sabor", "Deutsches Fest" (The festival celebrates and preserves the cultural customs, the gastronomy and everything related to the German traditions. In 2018, the party celebrated 160 years of the German immigration to Juiz de Fora), "Comida di Buteco JF" and "Festival de Bandas Novas". The rock festival has been supporting the local music scene and promoting countless new bands since 1999.

The Federal University and several private-owned colleges in Juiz de Fora turn it in a highly sought destination for students. Some of the courses at the Universidade Federal de Juiz de Fora are reputedly among the best in Brazil, considered the second best university in the state of Minas Gerais and 14th position among Brazilian universities according to international ranking in 2018. The cultural life of Juiz de Fora is marked by great eclecticism, which can be seen in its architecture. Art Nouveau buildings dating from the first decade of the 20th century are intermingled with those in Art Deco style from the mid-20th century, and many modern concrete edifices including one building by Oscar Niemeyer.

== Sport ==
=== Football ===
Juiz de Fora is the home of Tupi and Tupynambás. Tupi was the 1932 runner-up of Campeonato Mineiro, and has won several city championships. Tupi won the Campeonato Mineiro Módulo II in 2001, was 3rd place in 2008 Campeonato Mineiro and won Taça Minas Gerais in 2008. It is widely regarded as one of the most important teams of the state, despite lacking national prestige. They won the 2011 Campeonato Brasileiro Série D (national fourth division) after beating Santa Cruz in both legs of the final, having qualified for the tournament after América de Teófilo Otoni withdrew before the start of the competition. In 2015, they finished 3rd place at the 2015 Campeonato Brasileiro Série C, achieving promotion for the Brazilian second tier for the first time in the team history. However, they finished 18th in the 2016 Campeonato Brasileiro Série B and was relegated back to Série C. After missing promotion in the final stage in 2017, the next year saw Tupi relegated to Série D due to goal difference.

Meanwhile, after the 60s, Tupynambás had sporadically played at Campeonato Mineiro Módulo II with their football department closed most of the years. They returned to professional football in 2016 after receiving a percentage fee from sale of Danilo, who started his youth career at the club, from Porto to Real Madrid and were promoted from the third division of Campeonato Mineiro in the same year. In 2018, Tupynambás finished in 2nd place at the second division of Campeonato Mineiro, earning promotion to the 2019 Campeonato Mineiro.

In 2019, with both teams together in Minas Gerais first division since 1970, Tupi had a disappointing campaign after failing to win a single match and being relegated after finishing in the last place; meanwhile Tupynambás won their first match by 5–1 against Villa Nova, defeated their city rivals in the second match by 1-0 and finished in the 8th place, being beaten by Atlético Mineiro in the quarter-finals.

=== Volleyball ===
In 2011, UFJF volleyball team won promotion to Superliga Brasileira de Voleibol for the first time. In its first season, UFJF finished 11th from 12 teams and is pending invitation to stay at the top division for 2012/13 season. Later on the team changed its name to JF Vôlei and it was ranked # 7 in the superliga 2016/2017, the team's best performance so far.

== Demography ==
Ethnic groups found in Juiz de Fora include: Portuguese, Italians, Africans, Germans, Lebanese, Syrians, others Arabs, Japanese, Romani and more recently Venezuelans, Chinese and Koreans.

The population was 238,510 in 1970 with 7.6% living in rural areas.

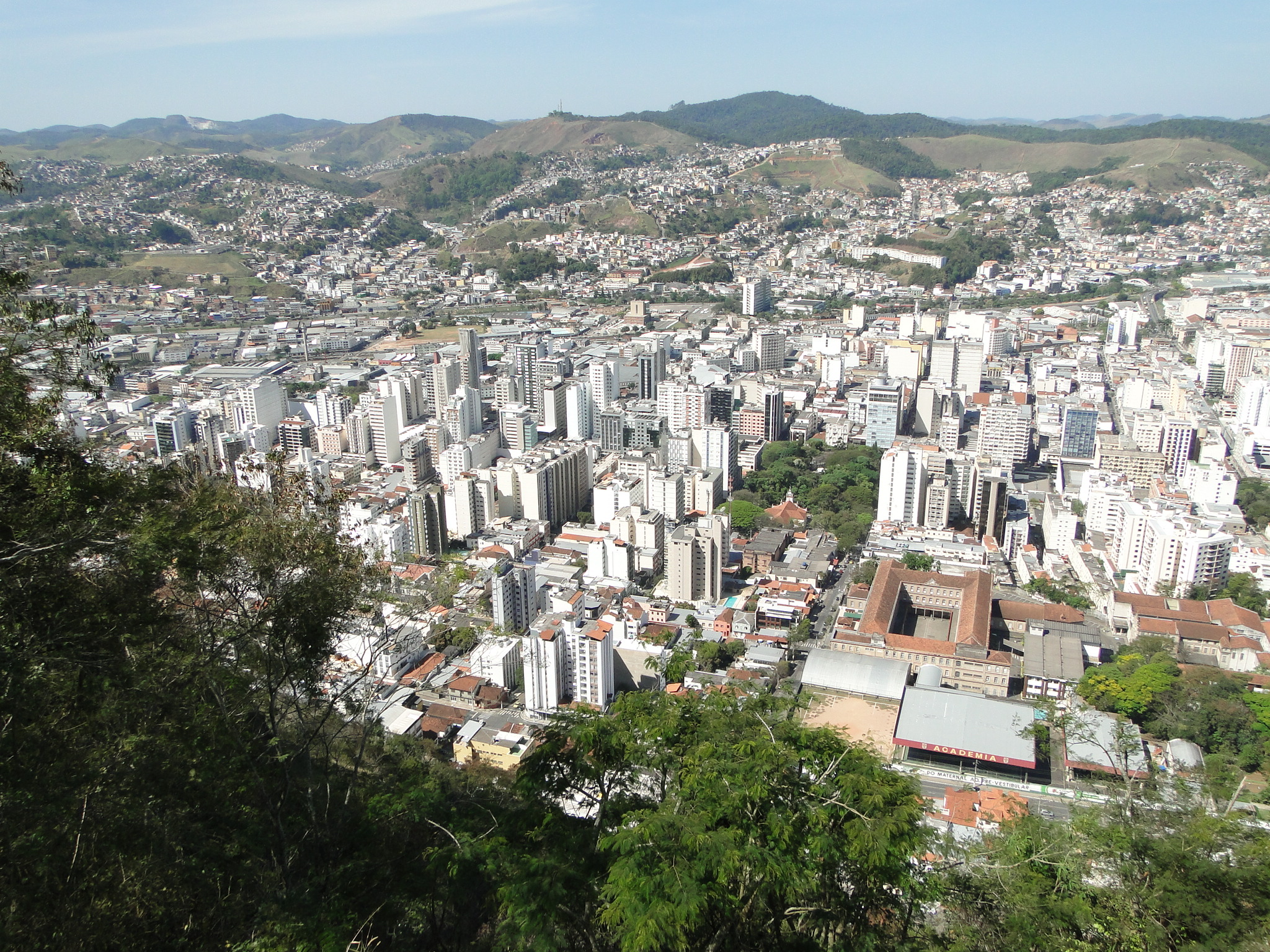
Juiz de Fora downtown.

As of the 2022 census, there were 540,756 people living in Juiz de Fora. The racial composition of the city in 2010 was:

Color/Race	Number	Percentage
White	294,080	56.9%
Mixed	144,153	27.9%
Black	73,942	14.3%
Asian	837	0.1%
Amerindian	538	0.1%

The population of Juiz de Fora since the first census, in 1872 (also including estimates):

Year	Population
1872	18,800
1890	22,600
1920	118,500
1940	118,400
1950	111,300
1960	125,000
1970	238,500
1980	305,800
1991	385,100
1996	424,000
2000	456,400
2002	471,693
2005	501,153
2006	509,109
2007	513,348
2008	520,612
2009	526,706
2014	550,710
2017	563,769
2020	573,285
2022	540,756

== Notable people ==
- Geraldo Majella Agnelo (cardinal and papabile) in the 2013 papal conclave
- Felipe Roque (volleyball player)
- Scheila Carvalho (model, dancer)
- Fernando Cedrola (footballer)
- Daniel (former professional footballer, murdered in 2018)
- Bernardo Faria (Brazilian jiu-jitsu world champion)
- Cafuringa (former professional footballer)
- Itamar Franco (former Brazilian President and former mayor of the city)
- Márcia Fu (former Brazilian female volleyball player)
- Larissa Oliveira (former Brazilian female swimmer)
- Giovane Gávio (former Brazilian volleyball player)
- Natália Guimarães (Miss Brazil 2007, 1st runner up Miss Universe 2007)
- Zé Carlos, Brazilian football player.
- Júlia Horta (Miss Brasil 2019)
- Andrade, former footballer
- Hudson (professional footballer, currently at São Paulo)
- Marcelo (former footballer and one of the victims of Chapecoense plane crash)
- Fab Melo (former NBA basketball player)
- Murilo Mendes (poet)
- Guilherme Marques (beach volleyball player, world champion)
- Heitor Canalli, the first football player from Minas Gerais to participate in a World Cup.
- Lara Rodrigues (actress)
- Thomás (professional footballer)
- Wesley (professional footballer, currently at English club Aston Villa)

== See also ==
- List of municipalities in Minas Gerais
