= Pedro Teixeira, Minas Gerais =

Coordinates: 21°43′S 43°44′W

- Municipality
- Interactive map of Pedro Teixeira, Minas Gerais
- Country: Brazil
- Region: Southeast
- State: Minas Gerais
- Mesoregion: Vale do Rio Doce

Population (2020)
  - Total: 1,806
- Time zone: UTC−3 (BRT)

Pedro Teixeira, Minas Gerais is a municipality in the state of Minas Gerais in the Southeast region of Brazil.

== See also ==
- List of municipalities in Minas Gerais
