= Marmelos Zero Power Plant =

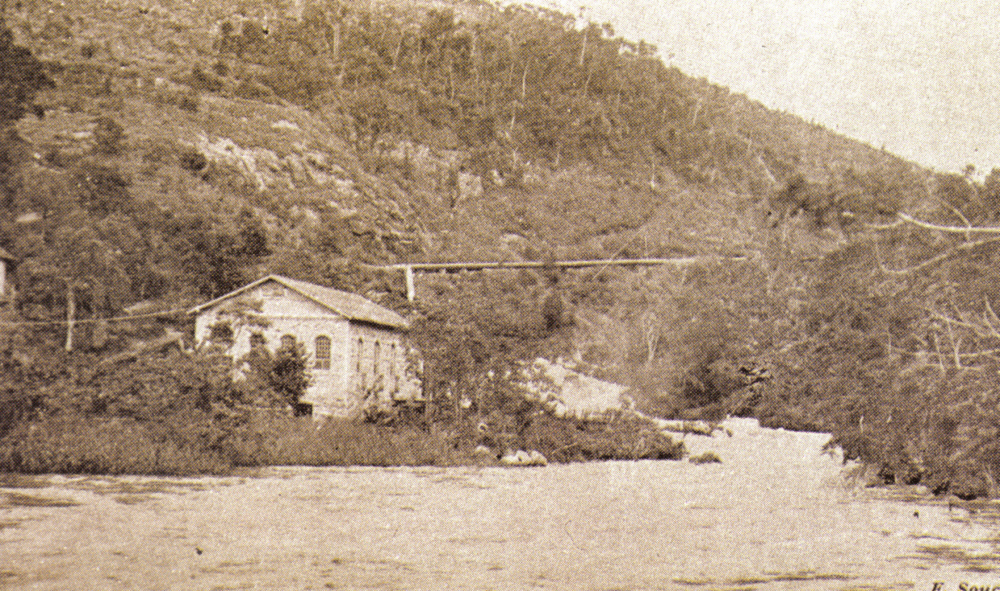
- The power plant in 1903

- Location within Brazil
- Official name: Usina de Marmelos Zero
- Country: Brazil
- Location: Juiz de Fora, Minas Gerais
- Coordinates: 21°47′12″S 43°18′30″W
- Status: Decommissioned
- Owner: CEMIG

Dam and spillways
- Impounds: Paraibuna River

Power Station
- Commission date: 1889
- Decommission date: 1896
- Type: Conventional
- Turbines: 2 (125 kW)
- Installed capacity: 250 kW (340 hp)

The Marmelos Zero Power Plant is a decommissioned hydroelectric power plant on the Paraibuna River in Juiz de Fora, Minas Gerais, Brazil. Inaugurated in 1889, plant was the first major hydroelectric power plant constructed in South America, specifically for public use. It was purchased by CEMIG in 1980 and now serves as a museum. The Marmelos IA and II downstream are still in operation and are serviced by the original dam.

== History ==
Bernardo Mascarenhas (1846-1899) became a resident of Juiz de Fora and as an adult became interested in providing electricity for the city. In 1886, Mascarenhas and banker Francisco Batista de Oliveira received approval from the city to use the Marmelos Falls for electric production and they subsequently incorporated the Minas Electricity Company. In February 1889, construction on the power plant began and by August, it began to produce initial electricity. The plant was inaugurated on September 5, 1889.

The power plant was supported by a 51-metre (167 ft) long and 2.4-metre (7 ft 10 in) high dam which diverts water into a canal on the river's southern bank that supplies the power station downstream. At first, the power plant utilized two 125 kW (168 hp) generators which operated single-phase alternators at a frequency of 60 hertz. In the next year, the plant powered 180 light-bulbs. In the following years, a third generator was added to the plant and it powered over 700 light-bulbs and contributed to industrial and public use in the city. By 1896, the power plant was decommissioned as new and improved plants such as the Marmelos I, IA and II were built that could better utilize the Marmelos Falls. Marmelos I is also decommissioned while IA and II continue operations with a capacity of 4 MW (5,400 hp).

In 1980, CEMIG purchased the power plant and renovated it. It became licensed as a museum in 1983 and as of 2000 it is maintained by Universidade Federal de Juiz de Fora under an agreement with CEMIG.
