= Ewbank da Câmara =

Ewbank da Câmara "Ewbank"
- Municipality
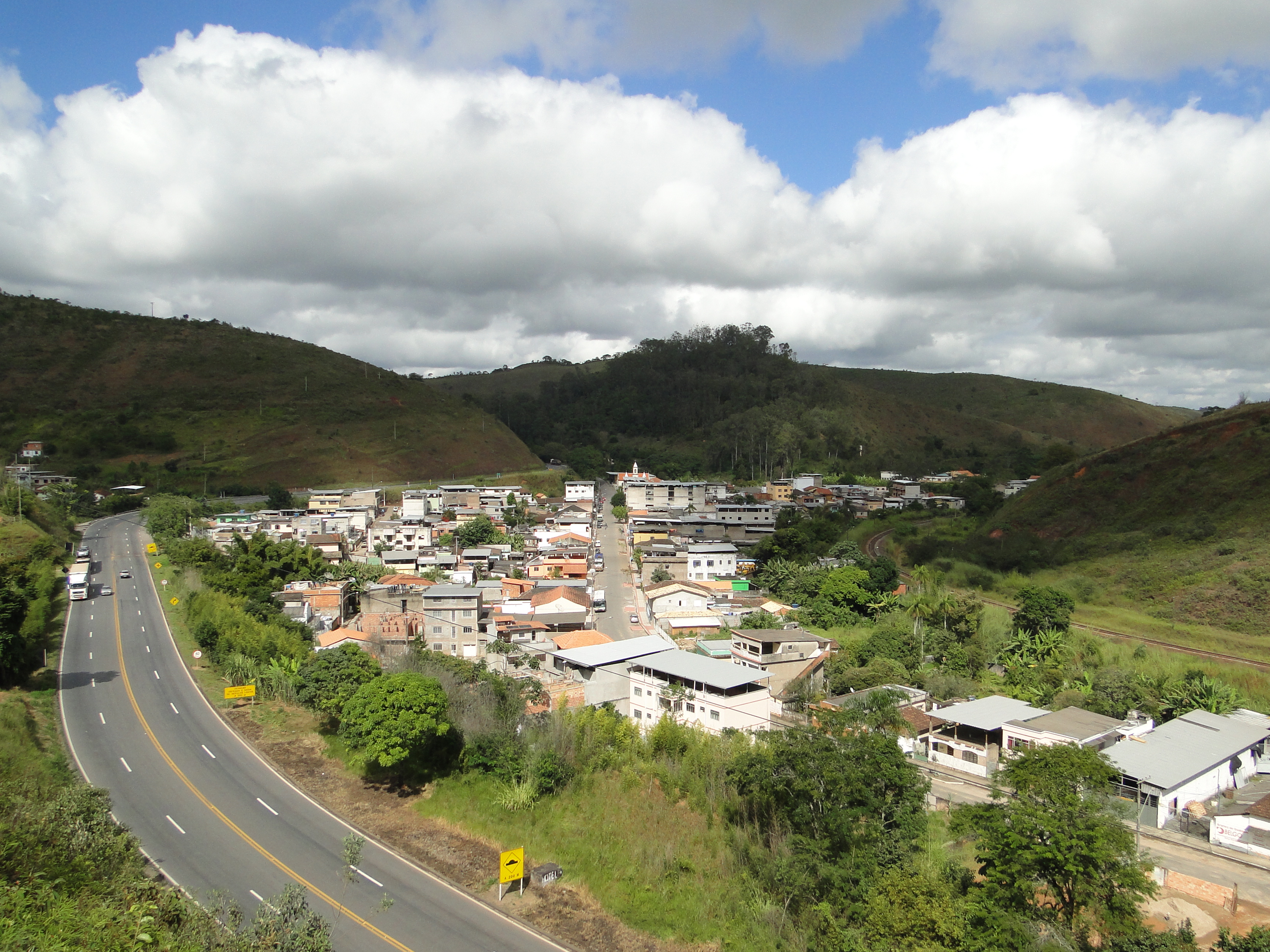
- Partial view of Ewbank (facing south)

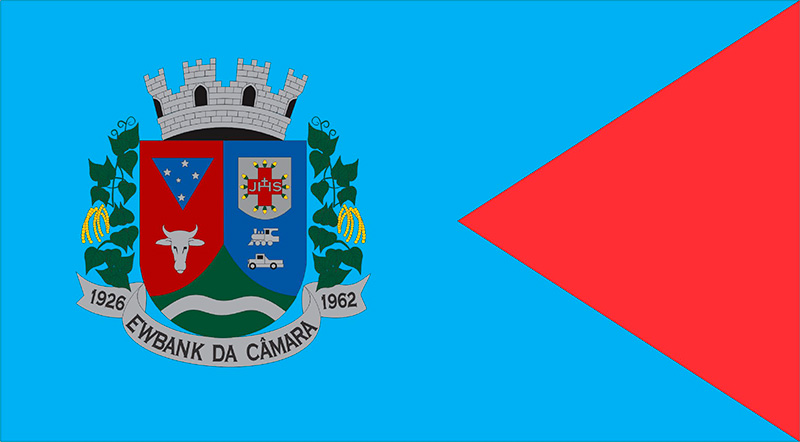
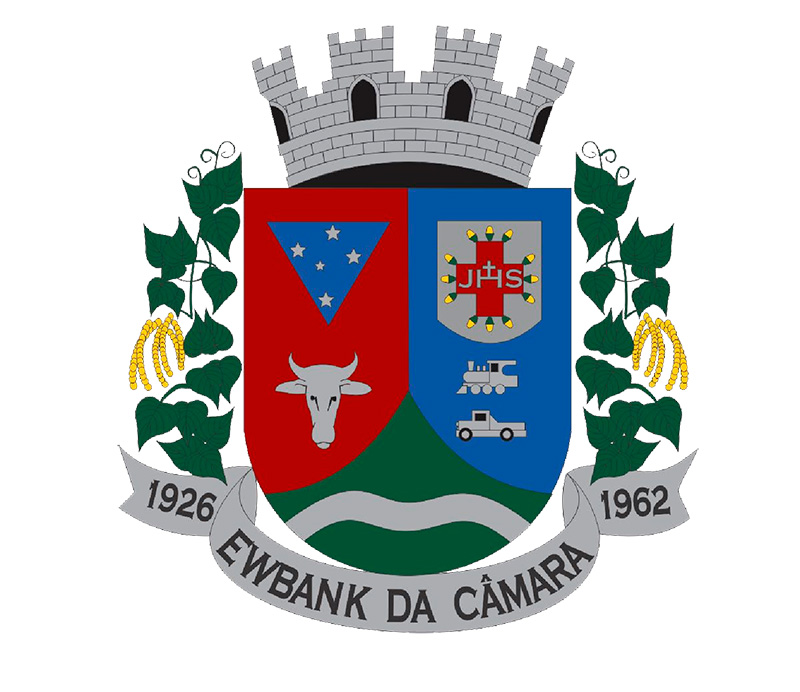
- Flag Coat of arms

- Location of Ewbank da Câmara in Minas Gerais

- Location in Brazil
- Coordinates: 21°33′03″S 43°30′36″W
- Country: Brazil
- Region: Southeast
- State: Minas Gerais
- Mesoregion: Zona da Mata
- Microregion: Juiz de Fora
- Incorporated: 30 December 1962

Government
  - Type: Executive and (Single-Chamber) Legislative Branches
  - Mayor: Mauro Luiz Martins Mendes

Area
  - Total: 103.834 km^{2} (40.091 sq mi)
- Elevation: 783 m (2,569 ft)

Population (2020)
  - Total: 3,923
  - Density: 37.69/km^{2} (97.6/sq mi)
- Time zone: UTC−3 (BRT)
- CEP: 36108-000
- Area code: +55.32
- Demonym: Ewbankense
- Website: Ewbank da Câmara, Minas Gerais

Ewbank da Câmara is a municipality in the state of Minas Gerais, Brazil. Belonging to the mesoregion of the Zona da Mata and the microregion of Juiz de Fora, the municipality is located some 241 km to the southeast of the state capital, Belo Horizonte. In 2020, its population was 3,923, according to the Brazilian Institute of Geography and Statistics. It occupies an area of 103.834 km^{2}. The urban area of the municipality constitutes a small part of the total. The rural area, predominantly in the municipality, has Atlantic rainforest vegetation.

The city has its origin connected to the railway station Ewbank da Câmara of the railway Dom Pedro II transformed into Brazil's Central Railroad. The railway station opened on 12 October 1890 in the village of Tabuões. Around the station, the small town developed and was elevated to district on 7 September 1923, being it inaugurated on 6 January 1926, and to municipality on 30 December 1962, emancipated from Santos Dumont. The name of the municipality was a tribute to the engineer José Felipe Neri Ewbank da Câmara, then director of the railroad. The first municipal administration took office on 1 September 1963 with the mayor Mr. Jair Antonio da Silva. In 2010, the Municipal Human Development Index (MHDI) was 0.676 which is considered as an average index in relation to the state. The city is part of the commercial, industrial and services axis of nearby towns connected by BR 040, to the North, Santos Dumont, and to the South, Juiz de Fora.

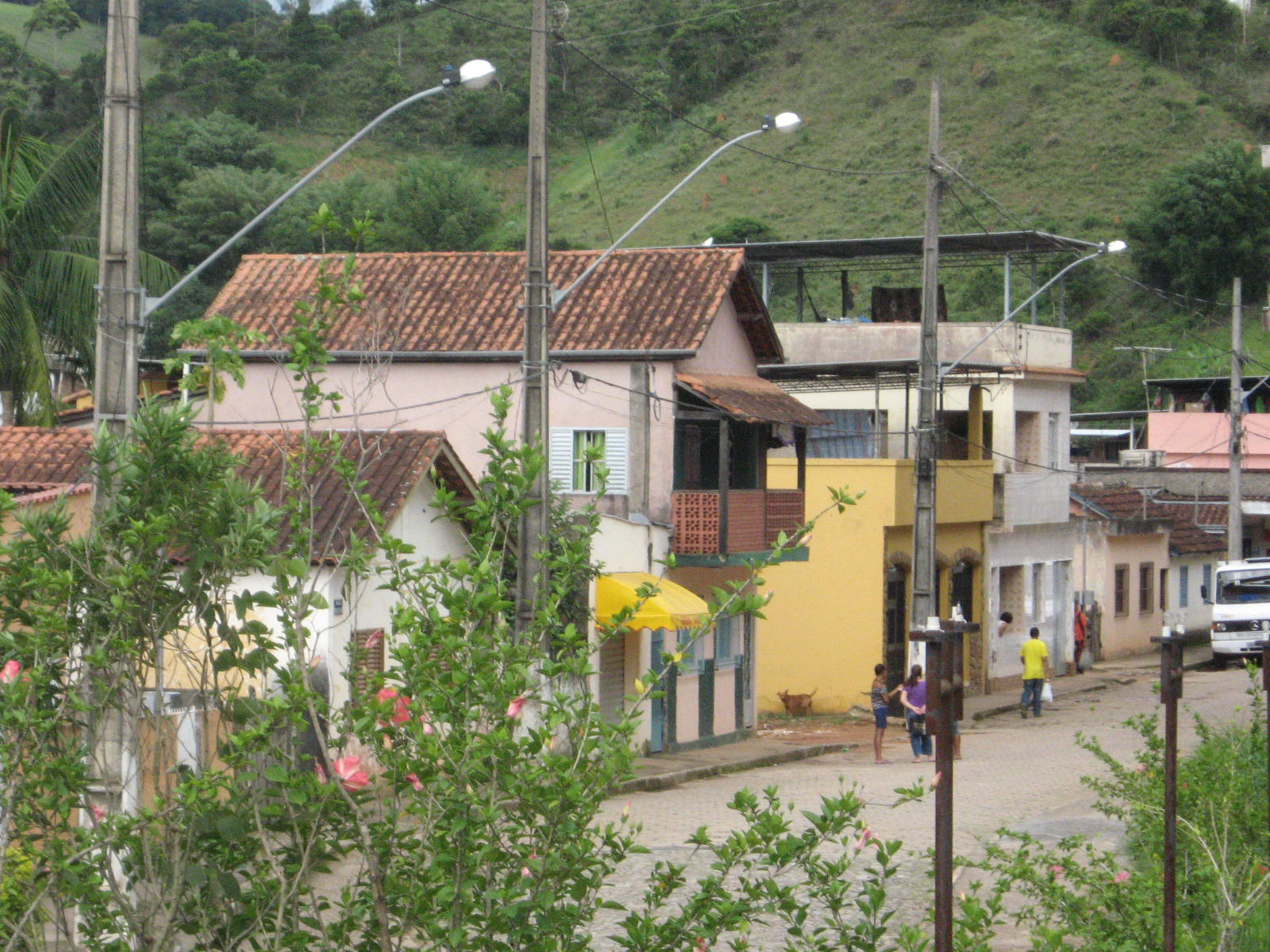
Ewbank da Câmara

The municipality has evolved from a rural culture (agriculture and animal husbandry), which is still present in the city life, to an urban culture. In 2009, its GDP reached R$19.5 million with a GDP per capita of R$5,307.42. Even having local commercial, industrial, and services activities, it serves as a dormitory town for those who work and study mainly in Juiz de Fora. The highlight is tourism for visitors interested in exploring historical trails of the Royal Road and the living nature with the tranquility of the lake that was formed from the Chapéu D’Úvas Dam. Its main football team is the Ewbankense Sport Club, founded in 1947. One of the main events is the festival of St. Anthony, the patron of the city.

== See also ==
- List of municipalities in Minas Gerais
