= Paiva, Minas Gerais =

Coordinates: 21°18′S 43°25′W

- Municipality
- Interactive map of Paiva, Minas Gerais
- Country: Brazil
- Region: Southeast
- State: Minas Gerais
- Mesoregion: Vale do Rio Doce

Population (2020)
  - Total: 1,523
- Time zone: UTC−3 (BRT)

Paiva, Minas Gerais is a municipality in the state of Minas Gerais in the Southeast region of Brazil.

== See also ==
- List of municipalities in Minas Gerais
