= Chácara, Minas Gerais =

Chácara
- Municipality
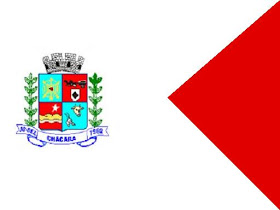
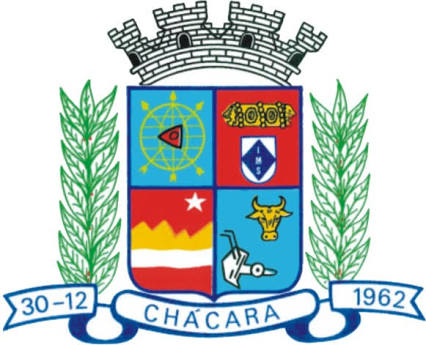
- Flag Coat of arms

- Location of Chácara within Minas Gerais
- Coordinates: 21°40′19″S 43°13′19″W
- Country: Brazil
- State: Minas Gerais
- Region: Zona da Mata
- District: Juiz de Fora
- Founded: 30 Dec 1962

Government
  - Mayor: Jucelio Fernandes de Oliveira

Population (2020)
  - Total: 3,186
- Time zone: UTC−3 (BRT)

Chácara is a municipality in the Brazilian state of Minas Gerais. Its population was estimated at 3,186 as of 2020.

== See also ==
- List of municipalities in Minas Gerais
