= Meninos Cantores da Academia =

Brazilian choir

Meninos Cantores da Academia is a Brazilian choir that was founded on July 11, 1953 by the priest José Maria Wisniewski of the SVD. Wisniewski had the intention of keeping the 500-year-old European tradition of boys' choirs alive in Brazil. His dream was to turn the Meninos Cantores da Academia into the "Music Ambassadors of Brazil."

Currently, the choir is made up of 47 members who vary from nine to twenty years of age. The choir is under the direction and regency of Fernando Benedito Vieira who trained with several choirs of Meninos Cantores from Europe. The group meets daily for two hours for musical studies, including vocal technique and repertoire rehearsals.

The choir has made five recordings, two LPs (in 1983 and 1991), and three CDs (in 1993, 1997, and 2003) .
