= Santana do Deserto =

Municipality in Minas Gerais, Brazil

Coordinates: 21°57′0″S 43°9′57″W

- Municipality
- Interactive map of Santana do Deserto
- Country: Brazil
- State: Minas Gerais
- Region: Southeast
- Time zone: UTC−3 (BRT)

Location of Santana do Deserto within Minas Gerais

Santana do Deserto is a municipality located in the state of Minas Gerais, Brazil. It is part of the Zona da Mata region, known for its mountainous terrain and rich history. The municipality, with its rural landscape, is also recognized for its agricultural activity, particularly the cultivation of crops suited to the area's temperate climate.

The town's name, Santana do Deserto, refers to the patron saint Santana and the term Deserto, which may indicate its historical isolation in the desert-like areas of the region. It offers a glimpse into rural Brazilian life, with an emphasis on small-scale farming and the preservation of local traditions..

== See also ==
- List of municipalities in Minas Gerais
