= Liberdade, Minas Gerais =

- Municipality
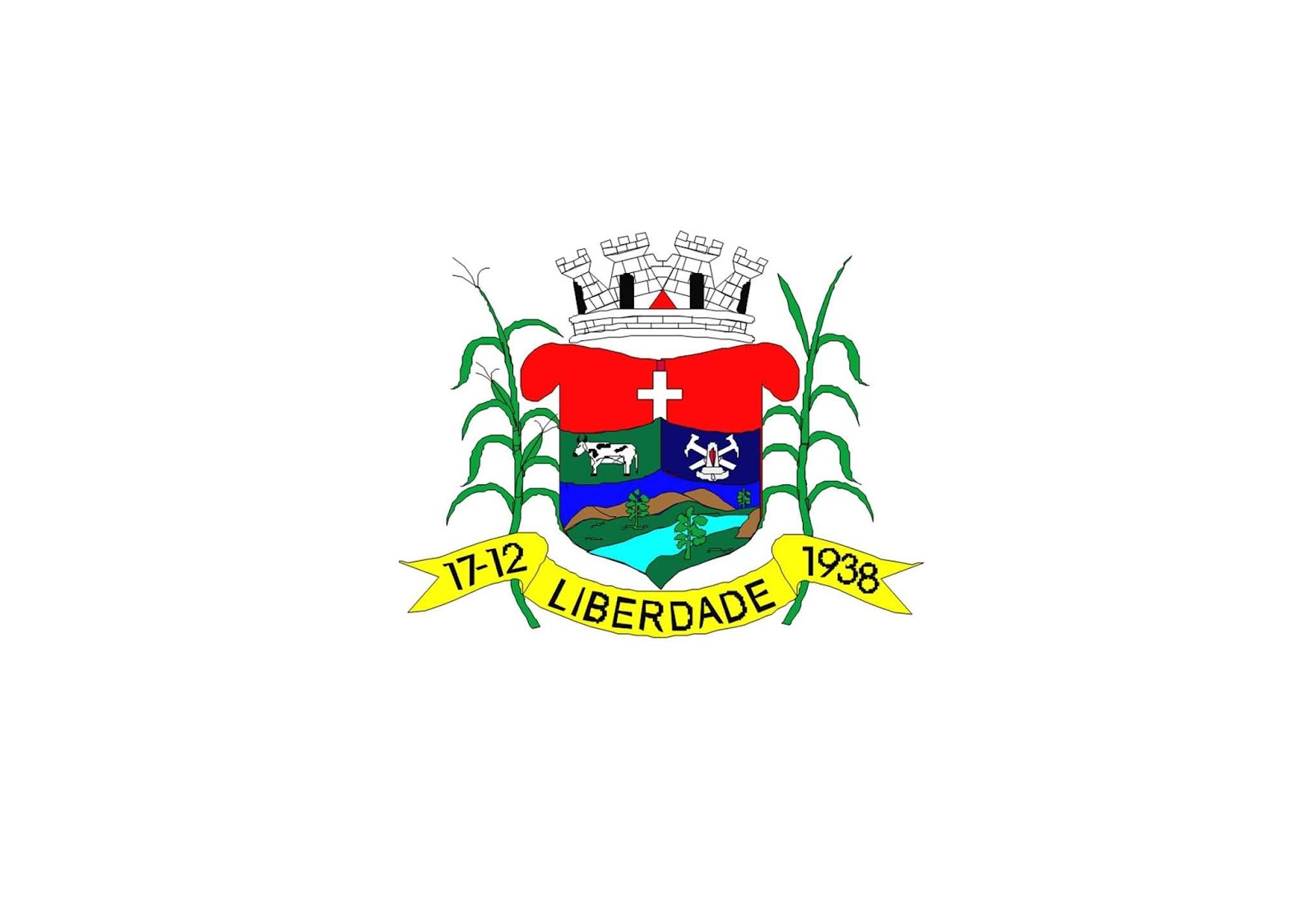
- Flag

- Location in Brazil
- Coordinates: 22°01′44″S 44°19′12″W
- Country: Brazil
- Region: Southeast
- State: Minas Gerais
- Mesoregion: Oeste de Minas

Government
  - Mayor: Walter de Assis Toledo Junior

Population (2020)
  - Total: 5,031
- Time zone: UTC−3 (BRT)

Liberdade, Minas Gerais is a municipality in the state of Minas Gerais in the Southeast region of Brazil.

== See also ==
- List of municipalities in Minas Gerais
