= Chiador =

Municipality in Minas Gerais, Brazil

Coordinates: 22°00′S 43°04′W

Chiador, Minas Gerais
- Municipality
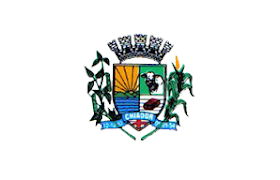
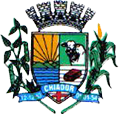
- Flag Coat of arms
- Interactive map of Chiador, Minas Gerais
- Country: Brazil
- Region: Southeast
- State: Minas Gerais
- Mesoregion: Vale do Rio Doce

Population (2020)
  - Total: 2,671
- Time zone: UTC−3 (BRT)

Chiador is a municipality in the state of Minas Gerais in the Southeast region of Brazil.

== See also ==
- List of municipalities in Minas Gerais
