= Matias Barbosa =

Coordinates: 21°52′S 43°19′W

- Municipality
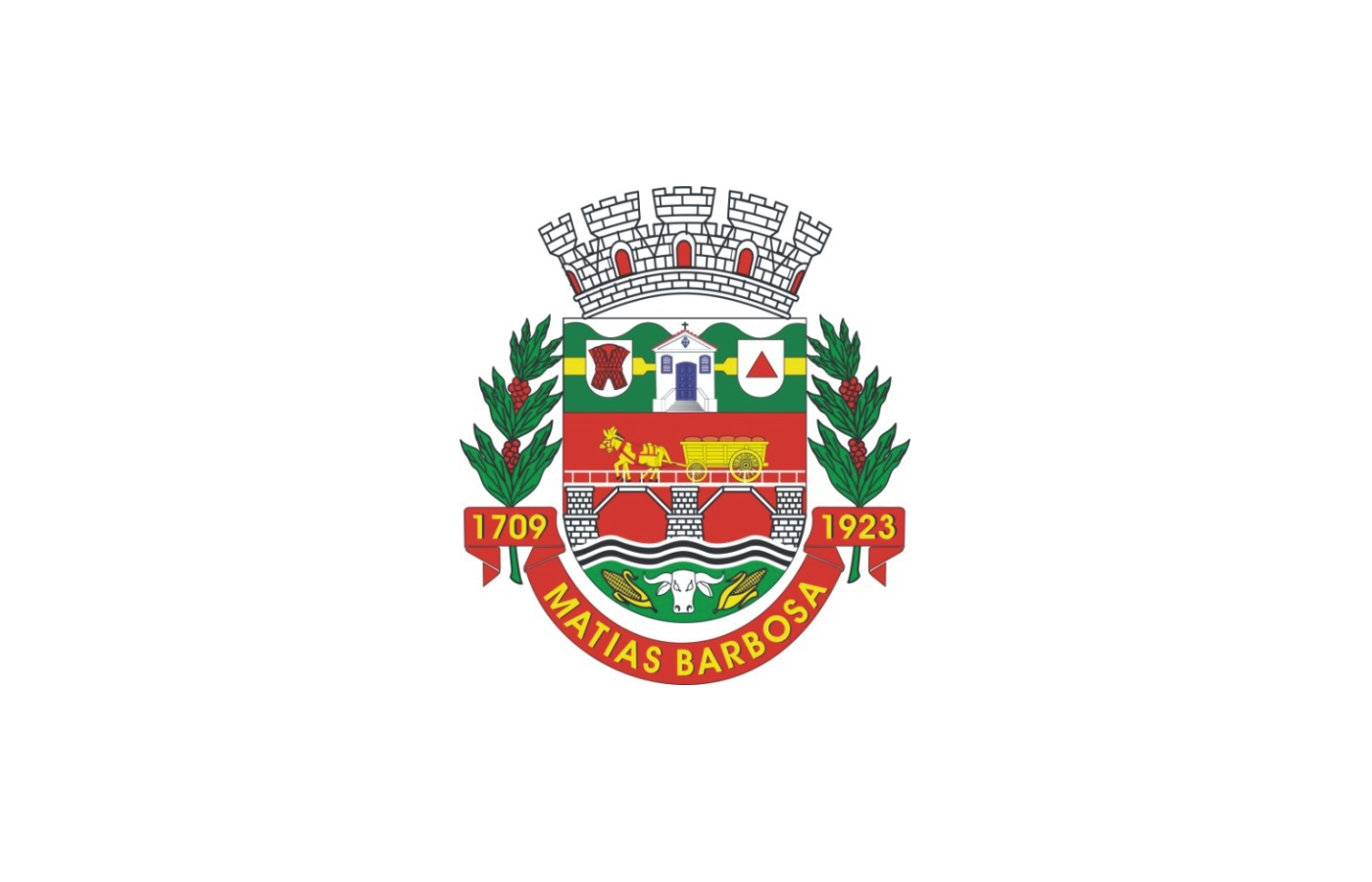
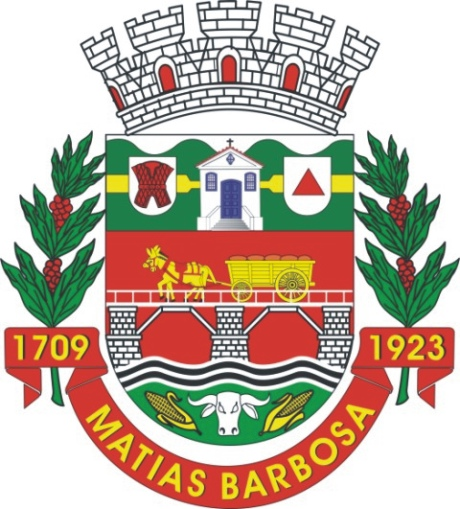
- Flag Coat of arms
- Interactive map of Matias Barbosa
- Country: Brazil
- Region: Southeast
- State: Minas Gerais
- Mesoregion: Zona da Mata

Population (2020)
  - Total: 14,548
- Time zone: UTC−3 (BRT)

Matias Barbosa is a municipality in the state of Minas Gerais in the Southeast region of Brazil.

== See also ==
- List of municipalities in Minas Gerais
