= Andrelândia =

Municipality in the state of Minas Gerais, Brazil

- Municipality
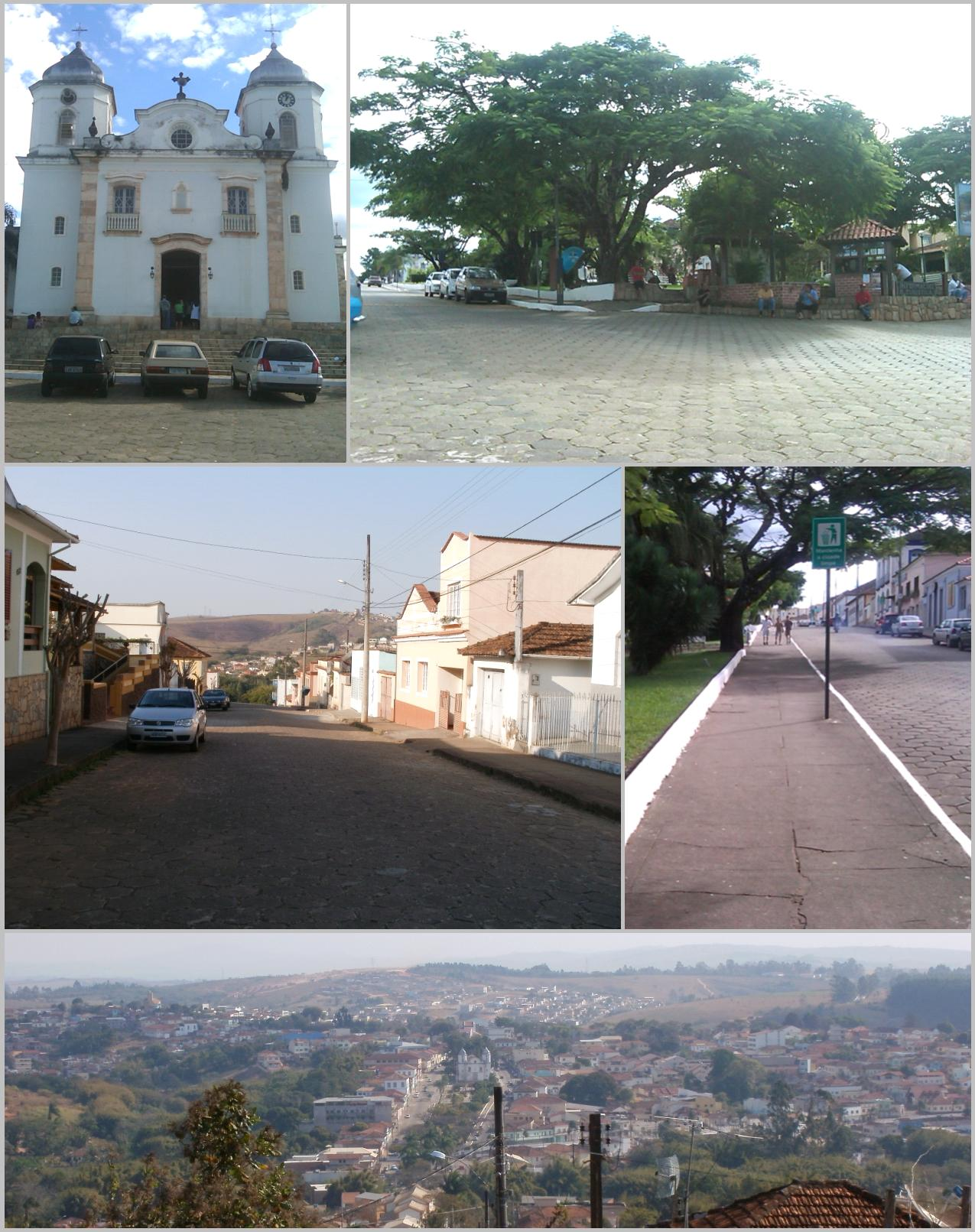
- Above left, the Mother Church; above right, Andrelândia's center; middle left, Doutor Antônio Juracy de Oliveira street; middle right, Mother Church Square; below, partial view of the city.

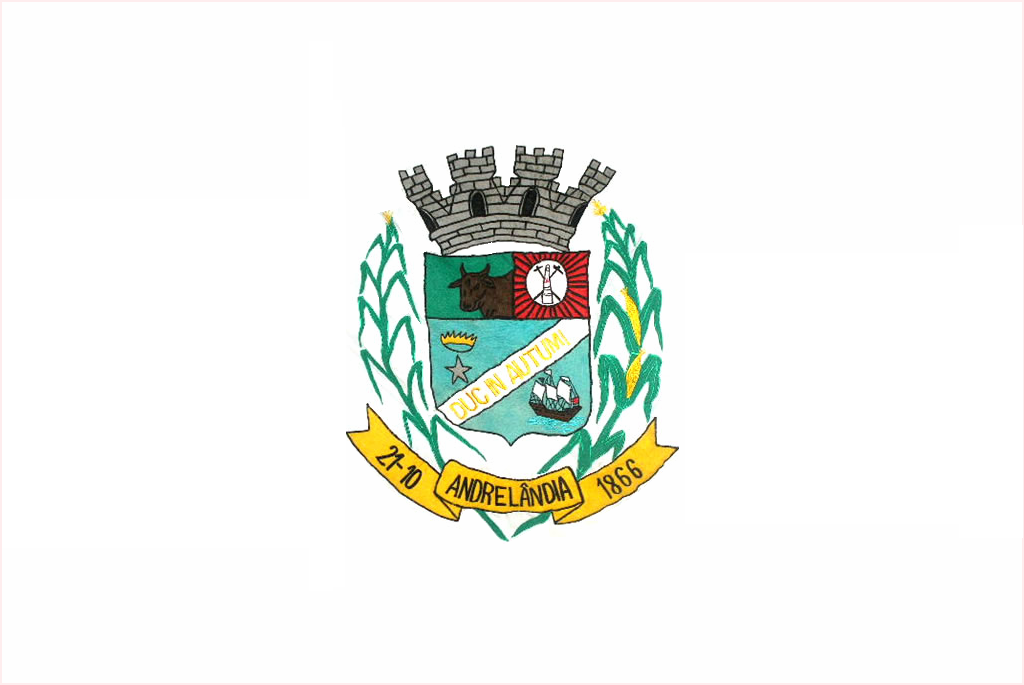
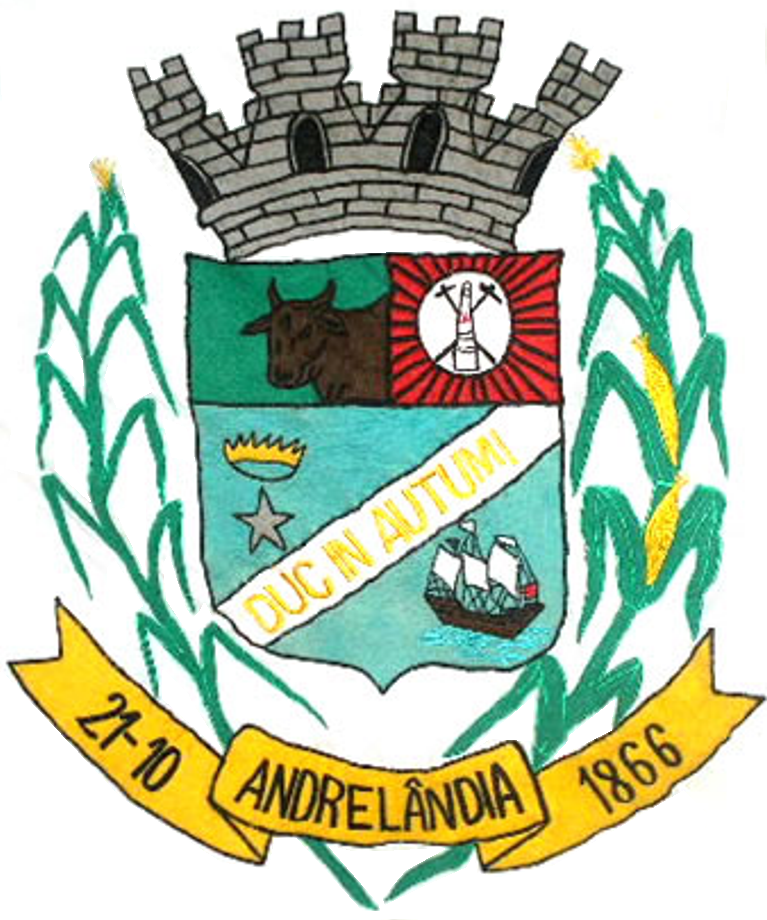
- Flag Coat of arms
- Nicknames: "Municipality of Turvo" "André's land" "Andrepolis
- Motto: Duc In Altum! _{"Launch yourself upwards!"}

- Location of Andrelândia, Minas Gerais, Brazil
- Coordinates: 21°44′24″S 44°18′32″W
- Country: Brazil
- Region: Southeast
- State: Minas Gerais
- Established: 07 July 1868

Government
  - Mayor: Francisco Reginaldo Nogueira (PSD)

Area
  - Total: 1,004.536 km^{2} (387.854 sq mi)
- Elevation: 1,000 m (3,300 ft)

Population
  - Total: 12,507
- Time zone: UTC-3
  - Summer (DST): UTC-2 (UTC-2)
- Postal Code: 37300-000 to 37304-999
- Area code: +55 35
- HDI (2010): 0.700 – high
- GDP: R$ 127.669
- GDP per capita: R$ 10.505,13
- Website: www.andrelandia.mg.gov.br

Andrelândia is a Brazilian municipality in the state of Minas Gerais that is located in the Mesoregion of South and Southwest of Minas and hosts the Microregion of Andrelândia. It is 300 km away from the state capital, Belo Horizonte and occupies an area of approximately 1 005 km^{2}. In 2014 its population was estimated at 12 507 inhabitants, being the 296th most populous municipality in the state of Minas Gerais and the second of its microregion.

It was founded on July 20, 1868, under the name Vila Bela do Turvo and consisted of five districts: Turvo, Arantes, Bom Jardim, Madre de Deus do Rio Grande and San Vicente Ferrer. Over the years the districts turned into cities, leaving only Andrelândia only the municipal seat. Throughout its history, the municipality had several denominations but has had its current name since state law 1160, of September 19, 1930.

The city has a great tradition in tourism and many of its old houses are considered historical municipal patrimonies. Other highlights are the religious festivals, such as the Feast of Saint Sebastian, the Feast of Kings, the Holy Week, the Feast of San Benedict, Corpus Christi and the feast of the patron saint, Our Lady of Porto, in August.

The city is known for being the hometown of the internationally known professor, historian, and academic José Murilo de Carvalho.

== Etymology ==
It was renamed Vila Bela do Turvo, its first name, when it was elevated to the category of village by provincial law No. 1191 of July 27, 1864. It was elevated to the status of city, with the name Turvo, on July 20, 1868. Two years later, by provincial law No. 1644 of September 13, the municipality of Turvo was renamed Porto do Turvo. By state law No. 2 of September 14, 1891, the municipality of Porto do Turvo was renamed again as Turvo. By state law No. 556 of August 30, 1911, the then district of Nossa Senhora da Piedade do Rio Grande (belonging to Andrelândia) was renamed Arantes.

After state law nº 1 160, of September 19, 1930, the municipality of Turvo was renamed Andrelândia, the name that prevails today. Its toponymy is in honor of farmer André da Silveira, who was one of the first to settle in the region. André's concern was to establish a place of worship for the development of the city and its population, which culminated in the current municipality of Andrelândia.

== History ==
=== Colonization and Development ===
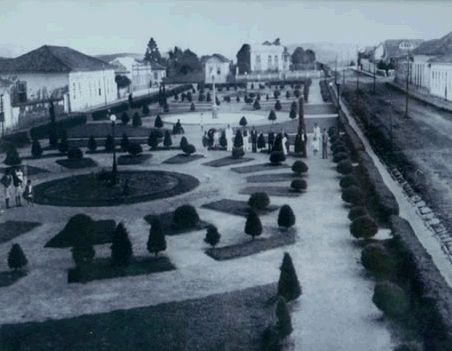
Visconde de Arantes Square in 1927

The beginning of the colonization of European origin in the region of the current city of Andrelândia was a consequence of the gold exploitation in the south of the state of Minas Gerais. In the mid-eighteenth century, the region where the city is today was already fully populated by explorers who came to the region in search of fortune.

Around 1740, the population flow in the region increased considerably. Many people demarcated an extension of wasteland, settled there and later took care of the legalization of possession through the granting of a letter of sesmaria, which was given by the governor of the Captaincy of Minas Gerais. The "Congonhal" region, which extends over a large area of fertile land on the right bank of the Turvo Grande River and received this name due to the abundance of trees, was one of the most populated areas.

In 1749, the farmer André da Silveira, feeling the need for religious assistance, asked the Bishop of Mariana for permission to build a church dedicated to Our Lady of Porto in the place called Turvo Pequeno. Heeded by the ecclesiastical authority, the chapel was built, receiving the Catholic blessing in 1755. Around the small temple, many houses were built, and soon the Arraial do Turvo, primitive name of the settlement, was formed. After the construction of the chapel, in 1827, the Arraial do Turvo was already in conditions to be elevated to parish, which in fact occurred, having, from then on, a progressive growth, until it was transformed into a village in 1864, by law nº 1.191 of July 27 of this year.

=== Ethnic Development ===
In the ethnic aspect, the population of Andrelândia has not suffered much miscegenation. A large part of the city has Portuguese ancestry, due to the first inhabitants who came along with the bandeirantes from São Paulo and founded the old farms, the first habitational centers, from which the city was born. The closest indigenous tribe was found farther south in Minas Gerais, in the region surrounding the springs of the Verde and Baependi rivers, near the Papagaio Mountain, around 1700. However, it was only between the 19th and 20th centuries that the first foreigners began to arrive in Andrelândia, mostly Lebanese who came to Brazil in search of wealth. Besides the foreigners who arrived and integrated the population of Andrelândia, many other families, from other cities and regions of Brazil, were also attracted by the riches of the place. From Italy came the D'Alessandro and Rivelli families; from Spain, Laredo, Casas Martins, and Garrido, and from Portugal, Gaspar and Pereira. Almost all of them were motivated by the construction of the West of Minas Railroad, inaugurated on June 14, 1914, or were tempted to progress with the benefits resulting from its operation.

There was a small group of people in the city, mainly of European origin, who frequented the market of Andrelândia in the early twentieth century and who, as attested by the elders, were the first street sellers of the current city. These people lived in a region not far from the town, called Congonhal, near the Bandeira Mountain, and for this reason they were called Congonheiras. They traveled around the city selling the harvest of their small crops and were known for not accepting the jobs that were offered to them. The Congonheiros still exist, and in much larger numbers, but they have diversified their way of life: they lost the distinction that marginalized them and many moved to the city. They married into other families, learned and dedicated themselves to the most varied trades and professions.

=== Administrative evolution ===
There was one detail missing to elevate the village to the status of municipality. According to the legislation in force, this could only happen if the population founded, with its own resources, the building of the public jail and the town hall. Then, with the collaboration of Antônio Belfort de Arantes and his son, Antônio Belfort Ribeiro de Arantes, the works could be executed and the small village was raised to the category of municipality on October 21, 1866. On July 20, 1868, the emancipation of Andrelândia took place officially, under the name of Turvo, by provincial law no. 1518.

Under state law No. 2 of September 14, 1891 the district of Nossa Senhora da Piedade do Rio Grande was created and attached to the then municipality of Turvo. By state law No. 556 of August 30, 1911, the district of Nossa Senhora da Piedade do Rio Grande was renamed Arantes, having then five districts: Turvo, Arantes, Bom Jardim, Madre de Deus do Rio Grande and São Vicente Ferrer. By state law No. 843 of September 7, 1923, the Madre de Deus do Rio Grande district was renamed Cianita and Senhor do Bom Jesus do Jardim was renamed Bom Jardim. By State Law No. 148, of December 17, 1938, the district of São Vicente Ferrer was dismembered from Andrelândia and raised to the category of municipality under the name of Francisco Sales. Under the same law, the district of Bom Jardim de Minas was dismembered from the municipality of Andrelândia, and became a municipality with the same name. By law No. 1039 of December 12, 1953, the districts of Arantes and Cianita were dismembered and elevated to the category of municipalities with the names, respectively, Piedade do Rio Grande and Madre de Deus de Minas, remaining until today only the municipal seat.

=== Economic Growth ===
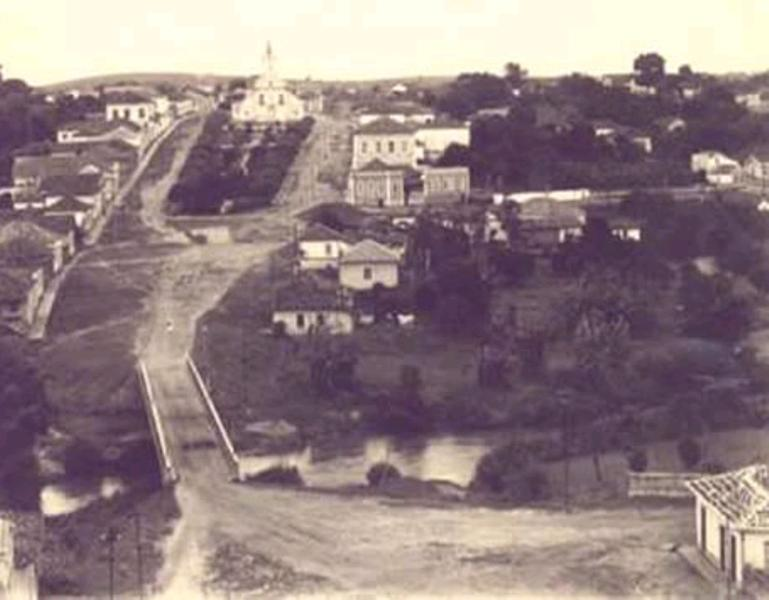
Andrelândia in 1930

In 1982, the Brazilian Institute of Geography and Statistics (IBGE) verified that there were 71 commercial establishments in the city. This was quite a considerable number for a city of low income and low consumption. Considering the momentum of the first three decades of the 20th century, the city lost in productive activity and monetary circulation, both in the urban and rural areas, due to the rural exodus that, consequently, decreased the labor force that is very difficult in this rugged and hard to reach region. With the low value of production and the high price of seeds and inputs, a natural consequence of a government policy that was not interested in the small producer, the man from the countryside was forced to abandon his work and look for the big urban centers, where he hoped to find some kind of work to maintain himself, or end up increasing the rate of unemployed, underemployed, slum dwellers, hungry, and even criminals.

Another event that marked and still reflects the history of the municipal economy is the fact that many industries installed at the end of the 19th century and the first half of the 20th century disappeared, without any plausible explanation. However, the commercial movement in Andrelândia has developed considerably, especially since the early 1990s, which was a visible sign of the city's economic growth and modernization.

=== Recent History ===
With the growth of Andrelândia and nearby cities, the Microregion of Andrelândia was created, gathering, besides the municipality, twelve other cities: Aiuruoca, Arantina, Bocaina de Minas, Bom Jardim de Minas, Carvalhos, Cruzília, Liberdade, Minduri, Passa Vinte, São Vicente de Minas, Seritinga and Serranos. In 2006 its population was estimated at 75,631 inhabitants, by the Brazilian Institute of Geography and Statistics, in a total area of 5,034.106 km^{2}. Its Human Development Index (HDI) was 0.740 and the GDP per capita was R$3,796.46 in 2003. It is located in the Mesoregion of South and Southwest of Minas Gerais.

Currently, the town has been standing out in its tourism, with many of its old houses built in the 17th and 18th centuries becoming part of the town's historical heritage. Many of its squares and churches also preserve the baroque style from the time of the clearing of the region. Besides this, Andrelândia has also been developing its rural tourism, where the main attractions are the old farms, many from the 18th century.

== Geography ==
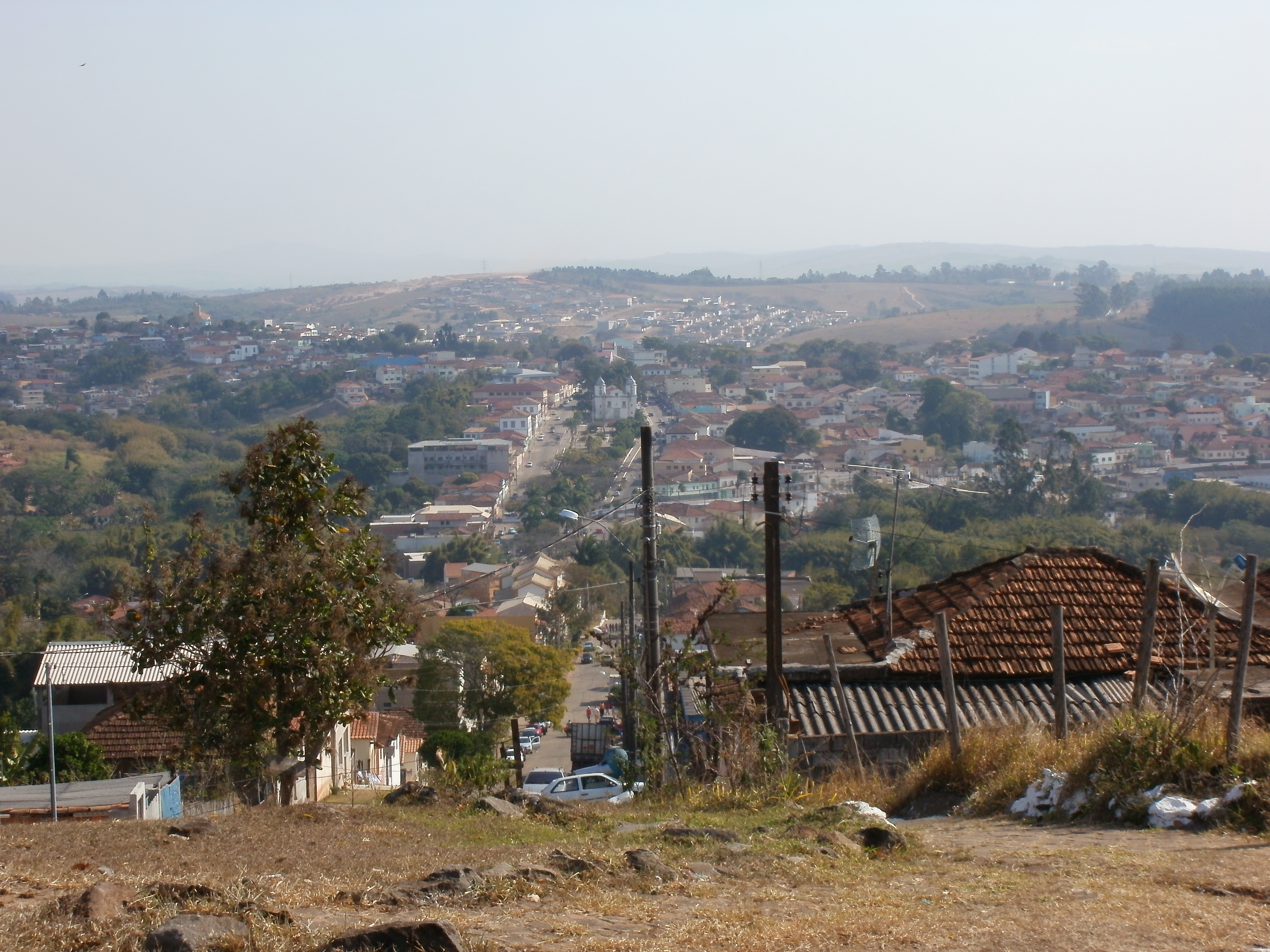
Partial view of Andrelandia

The geography of Andrelândia is homogeneous, with an undulating relief and Atlantic vegetation. The area of the municipality is 1,004.536 km^{2}, which represents 0.1713% of the Minas Gerais territory, 0.1087% of the area of the Southeast region of Brazil and 0.0118% of the whole Brazilian territory. The relief of Andrelândia is very rugged, corresponding geomorphologically to the Desiccated Plateau of the Upper Rio Grande, the Compartment of the Mantiqueira Mountains and the Aiuruoca River Depression, in the so-called Southern Minas Plateau. The confluence of its waters to the Rio Grande is defined between the north-left slope of the Mantiqueira Mountains range and the south of the municipality. The maximum altitude is 1 535 m. at Natureza Mountains and the minimum altitude is 934 m at Aiuruoca River; the headquarters is at an altitude of 1 000 m. In the municipality, the relief varies between hilly and undulating, where about 20% of the territory is flat, 20% of the land is hilly, and the remaining 60% is a sea of hills and mountains.

Andrelândia is located in the Mesoregion of Southeastern Minas and Microregion of Andrelândia, with an area of approximately 1,000 km^{2}. The municipality is bordered to the north by Madre de Deus de Minas and Piedade do Rio Grande; to the northeast by Santana do Garambéu; to the east by Lima Duarte; to the southeast by Bom Jardim de Minas; to the south by Arantina, Liberdade and Seritinga; to the southwest by Serranos and to the northwest by Sao Vicente de Minas. Andrelândia is 299 kilometers away from Belo Horizonte, in an axis almost equidistant from São Joao Del-Rei, Barbacena, Juiz de Fora and Caxambu, which allows it to be located, for tourism references, in a delta between the Vertentes Region, Zona da Mata-Sul (English: Forest South Zone) and Circuito das Águas (English: Water Circuit).

=== Geographic region ===
According to the most modern geographic classification (2017) of IBGE, Andrelândia is a municipality of the Immediate Geographic Region of Juiz de Fora, in the Intermediate Geographic Region of Juiz de Fora.

=== Hydrography ===
Its waters all flow northward, towards the Rio Grande Valley, forming the headwaters of the Platine Basin, through the following courses, which are the main ones: the Rio Grande, which northizes the municipality, coming from Bom Jardim de Minas towards Lima Duarte, Santana do Garambéu, Piedade do Rio Grande and Madre de Deus de Minas and receives directly, as tributaries, a multitude of streams, and the Capivari River that is born in Andrelândia and flows into the border of Santana do Garambéu with Piedade do Rio Grande.

On the other side of the municipality is the Aiuruoca River, calmer and with muddy waters, coming from Serranos, through a little uneven region, which has as its most voluminous affluent, by the right margin, the Turvo Grande River, after receiving the waters of the Turvo Pequeno River, also the Barra, Sardinha and Vacas creeks, besides many streams. The Aiuruoca River flows into the Rio Grande, outside the lands of Andrelândia, into the large artificial lake of the Camargos Hydroelectric Power Plant.

=== Climate ===
The climate of Andrelândia is characterized as subhumid temperate climate (type Cwb according to Köppen), with reduced rainfall in the winter and an average annual temperature around 19 °C, with dry and cold winters, often with frost in some areas, and humid summers with higher temperatures. January and February are the warmest months of the year, and June and July the coldest. Fall and spring are transition seasons. The annual rainfall is more than 1,500 millimeters (mm), with December being the month with the highest precipitation, which can occur in the form of rain and, on some occasions, hail.

The highest precipitation accumulation in less than 24 hours recorded in Andrelândia was 183 mm recorded on January 14, 2011. Other large accumulations were 154 mm on January 24, 1992; 146 mm on December 9, 1999; 144 mm on January 17, 1985; 143 mm on October 31, 1973; 138 mm on January 23, 1992; 137 mm on December 1, 1984; 126 mm on January 25, 1985; 122 mm on December 4, 1968; 115 mm on January 23, 1985 and January 19, 1977; 113 mm on December 8, 1981; 112 mm on March 23, 1999, and 111 mm on January 20, 1967.

Climate data for Andrelândia
Month	Jan	Feb	Mar	Apr	May	Jun	Jul	Aug	Sep	Oct	Nov	Dec	Year
Mean daily maximum °C (°F)	27.1 (80.8)	27.1 (80.8)	26.4 (79.5)	25 (77)	23.5 (74.3)	22.7 (72.9)	23 (73)	24.5 (76.1)	25.3 (77.5)	25.5 (77.9)	25.9 (78.6)	25.8 (78.4)	25.2 (77.4)
Mean daily minimum °C (°F)	16.4 (61.5)	16.4 (61.5)	15.5 (59.9)	13.6 (56.5)	10.9 (51.6)	9 (48)	8.6 (47.5)	9.8 (49.6)	12.2 (54.0)	14.1 (57.4)	15.1 (59.2)	15.5 (59.9)	13.1 (55.6)
Average precipitation mm (inches)	267 (10.5)	223 (8.8)	191 (7.5)	75 (3.0)	36 (1.4)	23 (0.9)	14 (0.6)	18 (0.7)	60 (2.4)	129 (5.1)	190 (7.5)	290 (11.4)	1,516 (59.7)
Source: Climate-data

=== Fauna and Flora ===
The native vegetation of the municipality belongs to the Atlantic Forest domain (Portuguese: Mata Atlântica), where trees such as trumpet trees, Brazilian rosewood, lenten trees, candelabra trees, and cedars stand out. The soil is acidic and with little organic matter, together with the dry climate, do not favor the quick growth of vegetation. The main economic activity in the rural area is dairy farming, and the annual burning of pastures is the usual management practice. As a consequence, the region has a high rate of destruction of its original vegetation cover.

The lack of forests and the poverty of the vegetation reduce the fauna to small rodents, very few mammals and wild animals, and small birds. Species of wolves, foxes, field dogs, ocelots, wild cats, deer, coatis, paca, capybara and marmosets can still be found, although in much reduced numbers, thanks to the invasion of their habitat by man. Predatory hunting has also contributed greatly to the disappearance or reduction of certain wild animals. The deer, the otter, the coati, the porcupine, and the capybara are examples of this: they were very common in the region, but are about to become extinct due to predatory hunting. The tinamou, the toucan and the penelope may be included in the list of birds doomed to extinction. Of the birds that inhabit the region, the largest are the seriema, the vulture, the hawk, the wild duck, the teal, the paturi, the white heron and the stork. The waters of Andrelândia, free of excessive pollution due to the absence of industry, are very good for amateur fishing. The most common fish in its streams and rivers are the astyanax and its many varieties, the sooty albatrosses or piaba, the mandi and its relatives (sallows, catfish and frogfish), the tabarana, the capinheiro, the timburé, the pirapetinga, the gilded catfish, the traíra, the angelfish and the tilapia, the last three, present in the natural lagoons and artificial dams.

To avoid greater environmental problems, the city government, together with other organizations and institutions in the municipality, has been organizing several environmental awareness campaigns, especially in the city's schools. Some, besides stimulating reading, also aim to make students aware of their responsibility for the environment in which they live.

== Demography ==
Population growth of Andrelândia
Year	Inhabitants
1970	13 231
1980	12 013
1991	12 497
2000	12 310
2010	12 146
Est. 2014	12 507

In 2010, the population of the municipality was estimated by the Brazilian Institute of Geography and Statistics at 12,146 inhabitants, being the 294th most populous municipality in the state, with a population density of 12.09 inhabitants per km^{2}. According to this same census, 49.90% of the population are men (6,061 inhabitants) and 50.10% are women (6,085 inhabitants). 80.67% of the population (9,798 inhabitants) live in the urban area while 19.33% (2,348 inhabitants) live in the rural area. According to the IBGE, Andrelândia had 8 834 voters in 2004. In 2008, 143 live births were registered in the municipality, 43 marriages, 8 separations, and 16 divorce requests were granted in the first instance. The municipality has one of the lowest child labor vulnerability rates in the state of Minas Gerais.

Its Municipal Human Development Index (HDI-M) of 0.700 is classified as high by the United Nations Development Program (UNDP). Considering only the education value, the index is 0.811 (high), while Brazil's is 0.849. Its longevity index is 0.725 (Brazil's is 0.638), and its income index is 0.663 (Brazil's is 0.723). The city has most of its indicators high and all above the national average according to the UNDP. The GDP per capita is 7,096.56 reais and the adult literacy rate is 16.060%. The Gini coefficient, which measures social inequality, is 0.46, with 1.00 being the worst number and 0.00 being the best. The incidence of poverty, measured by the IBGE, is 38.78%, the lower limit of incidence is 29.35%, the upper limit is 48.20%, and the incidence of subjective poverty is 30.98%. In 2000 the population of Andrelândia was composed of 8,353 whites (73.52%), 1,962 browns (17.27%), 965 blacks (8.49%), 10 yellows (0.09%), 5 indigenous (0.04%) and 67 undeclared (0.59%).

=== Religion ===
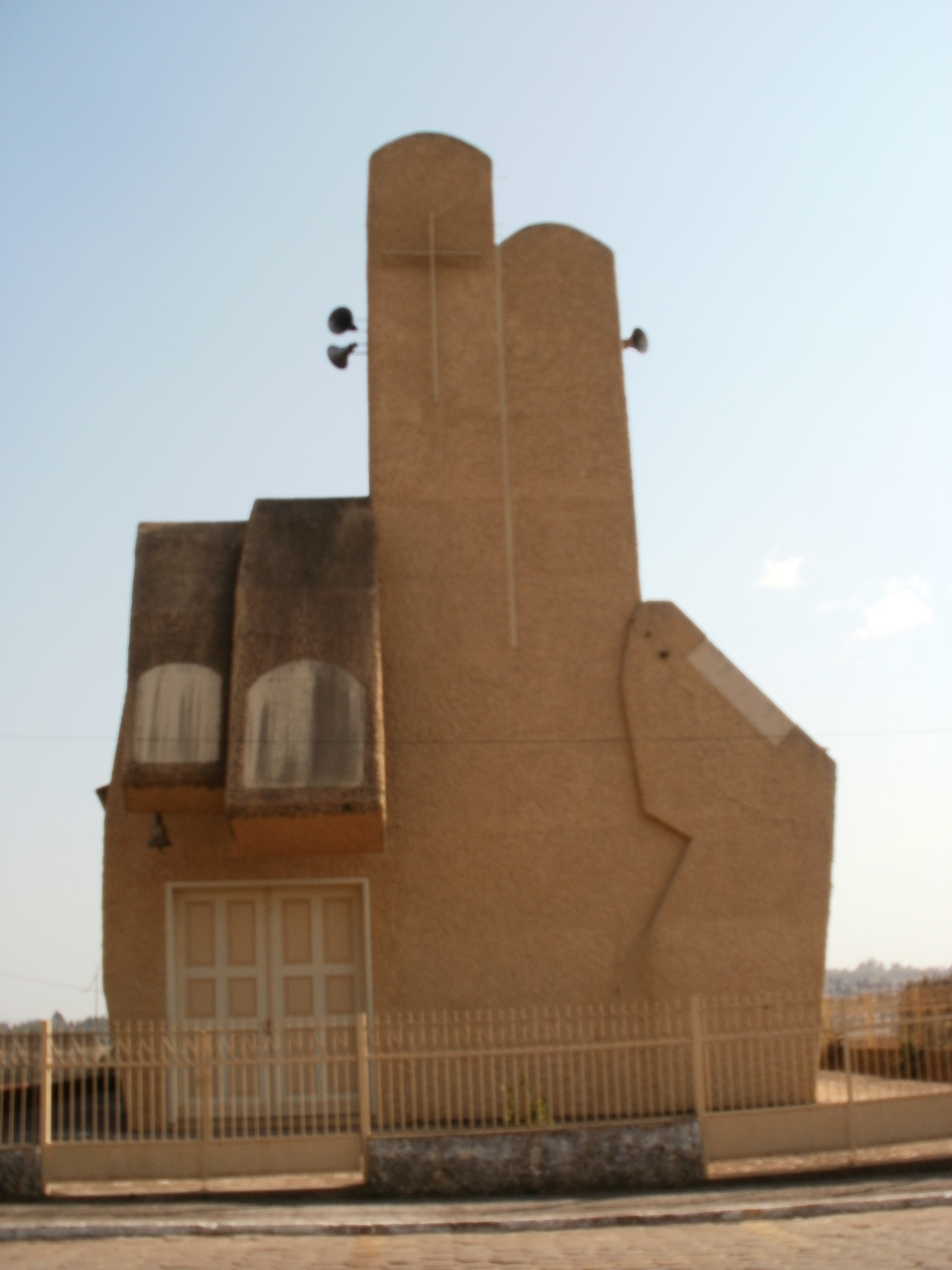
Church of Saint Benedict, located in the Areão neighborhood

Catholicism in Andrelândia not only interferes in its socio-political-administrative life, but has also accompanied its history since its origins. André da Silveira felt the need to build a chapel where people could gather, together with their families, to participate in the liturgical acts of the Catholic faith. The chapel of Our Lady of Porto do Turvo, as it had been baptized, was blessed in 1755, by the vicar of Aiuruoca, Father Francisco de Cerqueira Campos.

There are several religious manifestations present in the city. Although in recent years the growth of other religious beliefs has been noticed, the municipality still has an eminently Catholic social matrix and 89% of the population shares this faith. The city of Andrelândia is located in the most Catholic country in the world in absolute numbers. The Church had its legal status recognized by the federal government in October 2009, even though Brazil is currently an officially secular state.

According to 2010 census data, the population of Andrelândia is composed of:

- Roman Catholic Church: 89% - 10 681
- Evangelical Churches (Protestants): 9% - 1 081
- Atheists, agnostics, no religion and not determined: 1.5% - 182
- Other religions: 0.5% - 49

==== Ecclesiastical circumscription ====
The municipality is part of the Roman Catholic Diocese of São João del-Rei.

===== Catholic missionary =====
The African American priest Martin de Porres Ward was missionary in Andrelândia until his death, in 1999. Ward was given the title of honorary citizen in 1995. The bishop of the Roman Catholic Diocese of São João del-Rei, José Eudes Campos do Nascimento, gave start to the process of recognition of santity of Ward in 2020.

== Politics ==
=== Administration ===
According to the 1988 Constitution, Andrelândia is located in a presidential federal republic inspired by the American model. However, the Brazilian legal system follows the Roman-Germanic tradition of positive law, where municipal administration takes place through the executive and legislative branches.

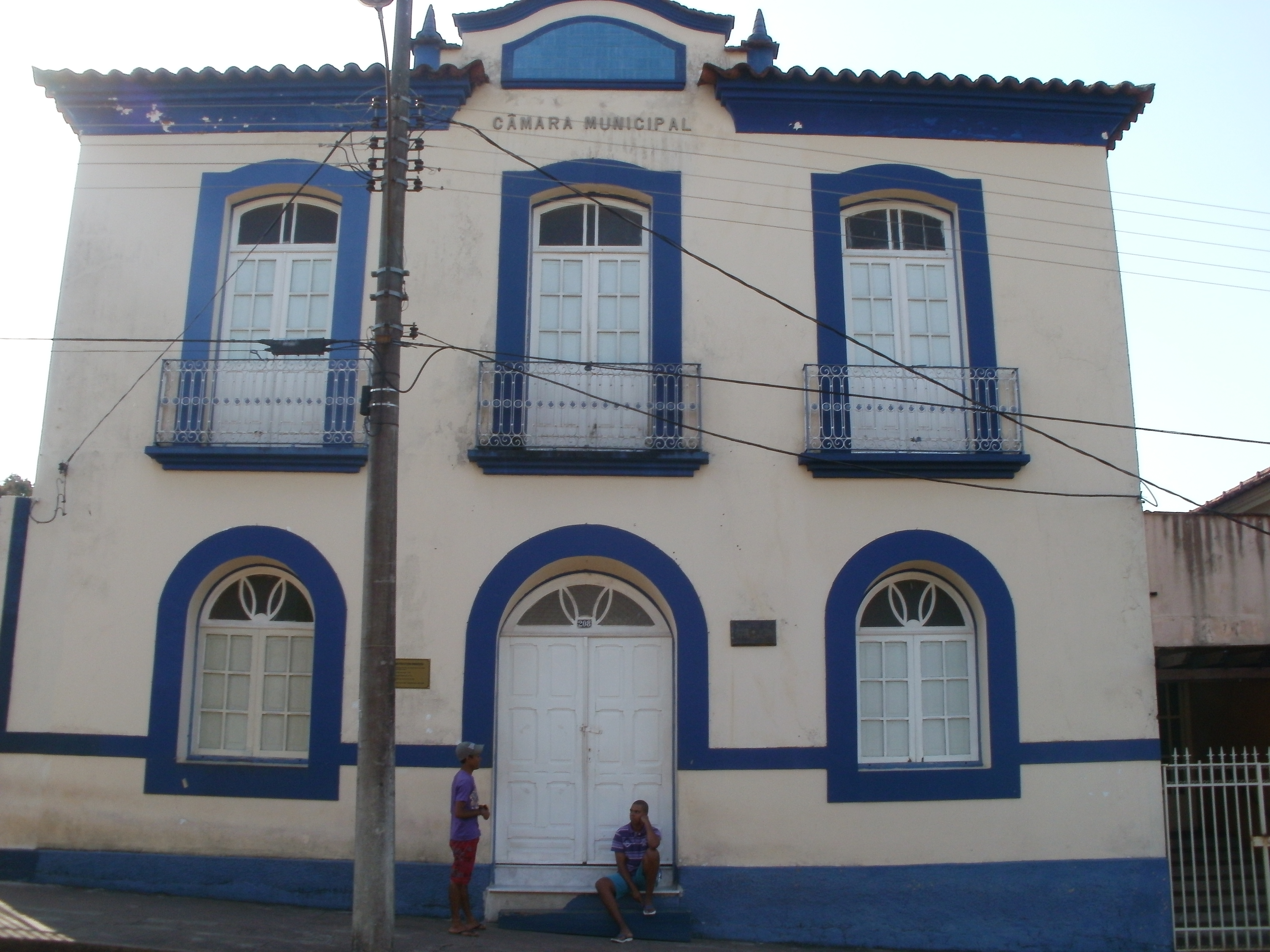
Headquarters of the City Hall and City Council

Before 1930, the municipalities were run by the presidentes of the town councils, also called executive agents. Municipal powers were separated into executive and legislative only after the Revolution of 1930. In 14 terms of office, 16 mayors passed through the mayoralty. In recent years the position was held by Samuel Isac Fonseca, of the Brazilian Social Democracy Party (PSDB), elected in Brazil's municipal elections in 2008 with 60.71% of the valid votes (4,624 votes) and reelected in the 2012 elections with 45.02% of the intentions (3,392 votes). Since the municipality has less than 200,000 voters, there was no second round.

The legislative branch consists of the city council, composed of nine councilmen elected for four-year terms (in compliance with the provisions of Article 29 of the 1988 Constitution) and is composed as follows: three seats from the Brazilian Social Democracy Party (PSDB), two seats from the Brazilian Labor Party (PTB), two seats from the Workers' Party (PT); one seat from the Brazilian Democratic Movement Party (PMDB); and one seat from the Green Party (PV). It is up to the house to elaborate and vote on fundamental laws for the administration and the Executive, especially the participatory budget (Budget Guidelines Law). The municipality of Andrelândia is governed by an organic law, which was revised to adapt to the Constitutional Amendment no. 101 of 2000. The city is also the seat of a judicial district. According to the TRE-MG (Regional Electoral Court of Minas Gerais), the municipality had in 2006 9,315 voters.

=== "Deer" and "Crabs ===
In the political history of the town, two local parties stood out: "Deer" and "Crabs" The political rivalry between them in Andrelândia has already exceeded a century of existence and remains alive in the minds of most of the inhabitants. Their origins are closely related to two great figures in history: Colonel José Bonifácio de Azevedo on the one hand and Visconde de Arantes on the other.

For a long time, Viscount Arantes was the absolute and undisputed leader of Turvo, relying on the totality of its electorate. In 1887 the first rebels and the first subtraction in his votes appeared. In 1890 hundreds of votes appeared against the Viscount, the second and more significant subtraction. In 1894 the supporters of the PRT outnumbered the supporters of the Viscount's party. Tradition has it that one of the majorities of the Viscount's faction, unhappy with this defeat, made the following remark in public: "It is not possible that our votes have diminished so much! We are going backwards! We look like Crabs!". This fact was humorously glossed over in the newspapers of the time. On the other hand, the PRT members were euphorically celebrating the massive vote they managed to get. A real leap, as the deer does when it is being chased. In 1889 José Bonifácio de Azevedo, João Zuquim de Figueiredo Neves and José Ribeiro Salgado, three of the major PRT's leaders, founded in Bahia Farm, municipality of Turvo, the second butter factory in Brazil, called "Deer Butter Factory - Azevedo & Cia", which established the nickname of the supporters of Colonel José Bonifácio's party.

Even today, although there are countless political parties of imposing acronyms in the municipality, in the municipal elections they irreducibly form two blocks: the "deer" and the "crabs", which rival. Such a struggle, however, lost its meaning long ago due to the city's lack of great resources, as the division of its community leads it to stagnation and retrogression.

== Subdivisions ==
The municipality of Andrelândia does not have administrative regions. When it was founded it was composed of five districts: Turvo (Headquarters), Arantes, Bom Jardim, Madre de Deus do Rio Grande and São Vicente Ferrer. However, as the years went by, all of them became cities, leaving to Andrelândia only the headquarters, currently its only district.

Some of the poorest neighborhoods are Santos Dumont and Vila Zamoura, where the city government needed to build houses for victims of a heavy rainfall at the end of 2008. Other less developed neighborhoods are also benefiting from the paving of their streets, such as Nossa Senhora de Fátima, Cruzeiro and Santa Clara. One of the main neighborhoods is Rosário, which, besides being one of the oldest, is where the municipal unit of the Family Health Program (PSF) is located, which also benefits the neighborhoods Vila Mariana, Serrinha, São José, Cruzeiro, Fábrica, Pedreira, Belo Horizonte I and II, and Santa Clara.

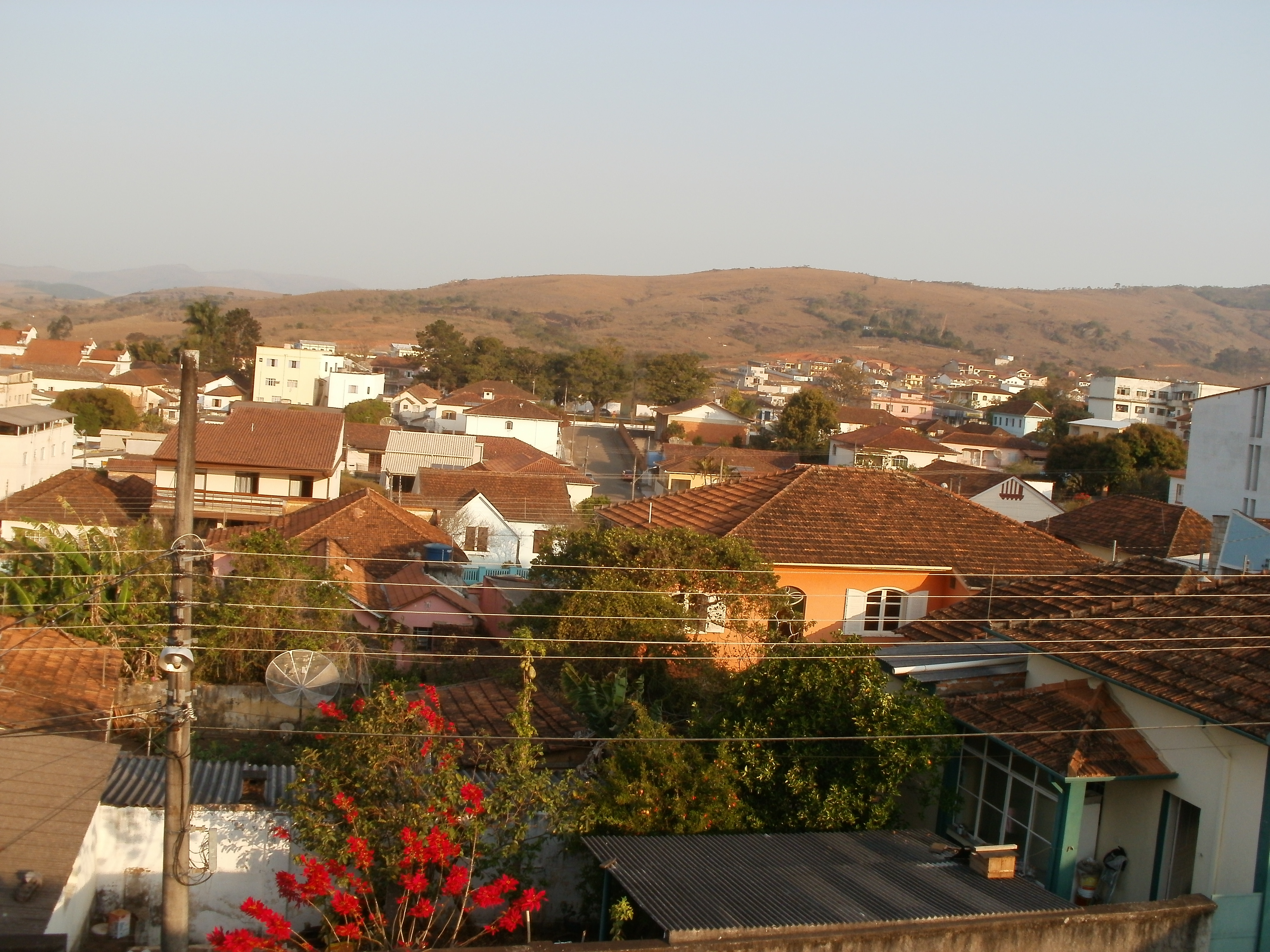
Partial view of the Center

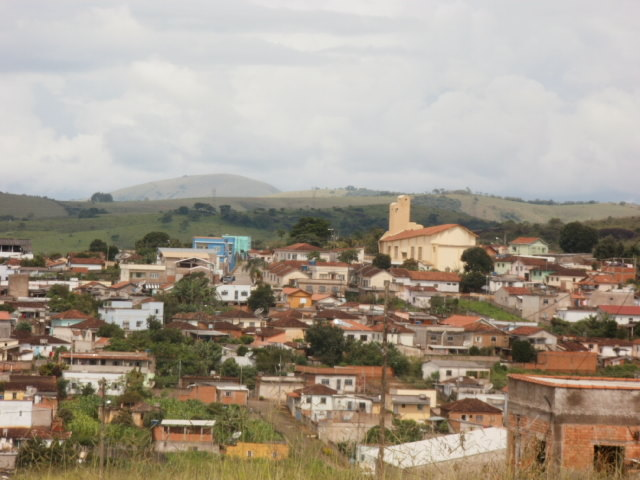
Nossa Senhora de Fátima and Areão neighborhoods

=== Neighborhoods ===
- Areão
- Belo Horizonte I
- Belo Horizonte II
- Bem Viver
- Centro
- Chácara
- Cruzeiro
- Fábrica
- Nossa Senhora de Fátima
- Parque das Pedreiras
- Quincas Tibúrcio
- Rosário
- Roseiral
- São Dimas
- São José
- Santa Clara
- Santa Tereza
- Santos Dumont
- Seminário
- Serrinha
- Vargem
- Vila Mariana
- Vila Zamoura

== Economy ==
The Gross Domestic Product - GDP of Andrelândia is the second largest of its microregion, with emphasis on the area of services. In the IBGE data of 2008, the municipality had R$87 812,889 in its Gross Domestic Product. Of this total, R$3,659 were from taxes on products net of subsidies. The GDP per capita was R$7,096.56.

=== Primary Sector ===
Corn, sugarcane and beans production (2008)
Product	Harvested area (Hectares)	Production (Ton)
Corn	3 000	15 600
Sugarcane	20	1 600
Beans	800	960

Agriculture has reasonable importance in Andrelândia. Of the entire gross domestic product of the city, R$16,990 is the gross added value of agriculture and cattle raising. The most important crops are rice, beans and corn. According to the Brazilian Institute of Geography and Statistics, in 2008 the municipality had a herd of 25 253 cattle, 3 093 pigs, 1 065 horses, 98 sheep, and 21 059 birds, among these 12 465 chickens, 8 594 roosters, chickens and chicks and 161 quails. In 2008, the city produced 18,709 liters of milk from 10,274 cows. There were 83,000 dozen hen eggs, 2,000 dozen quail eggs, 3,319 kilos of honeybee, and 40 kilos of wool.

The city's permanent farming produces mainly coffee (358 tons), grapes (140 tons), guava (88 tons) and tangerines (64 tons). In temporary farming, mainly corn (15,600 tons), beans (960 tons) and sugar cane (1,600 tons) are produced, the latter being cited as the main agricultural product in Brazil, being cultivated since the time of colonization of the country.

=== Secondary Sector ===
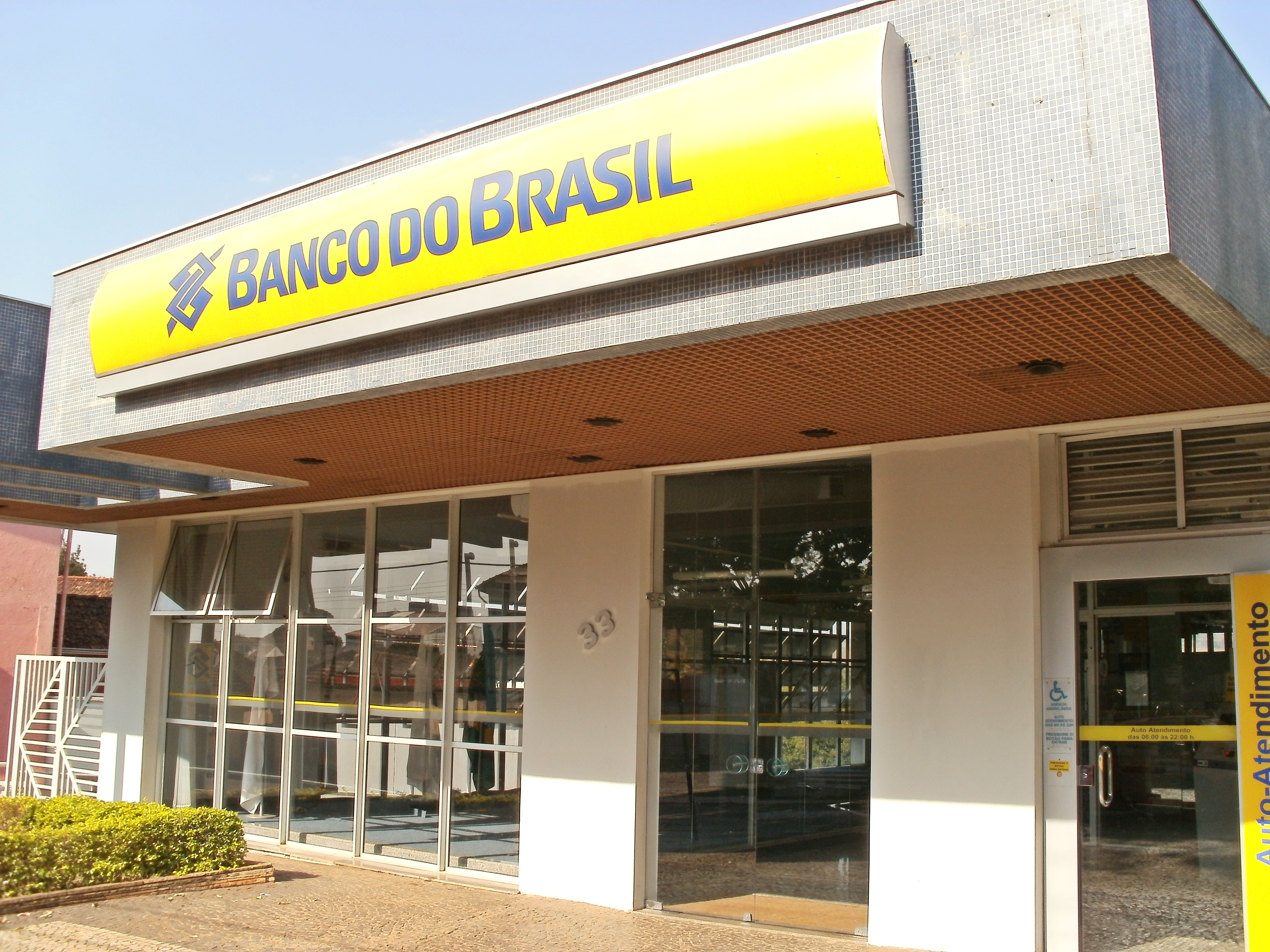
Banco do Brasil branch in Andrelândia

Industry is still very incipient in the municipality, even though it is starting to show signs of improvement, it is mainly limited to the production of dairy products. R$8,352 of the municipal GDP are from the gross added value of industry (secondary sector). In 2000, the main industrial companies classified according to the number of employees were Flor de Andrelândia Dairy products LTDA (manufacture of food products and beverages) and Seixas Pre-molded Industry and Commerce LTDA (manufacture of non-metallic mineral products). In the same year, 816 people were employed in the industrial sector.

=== Tertiary sector ===
R$43,512 of the municipal GDP is from services (tertiary). The tertiary sector is currently the main generator of Andrelândia's GDP. According to the IBGE, in 2008 the city had 402 companies and 2,781 workers, of which 1,617 were total employees and 1,164 were salaried employees. Salaries along with other remunerations totaled 9,584 reais and the average monthly salary of the whole municipality was 1.6 minimum wages.

The commercial movement in Andrelândia has expanded greatly since the early 1990s. It was a visible sign of the city's economic growth, modernization, and consequently, progress, despite the slow pace with which it developed before the 1990s. Currently the city's commerce still attracts consumers from neighboring towns for purchases of basic necessities, furniture and household appliances, with only the absence of car dealerships and other highly complex services.

=== Technology ===
Some companies in the technology area, mainly service providers, have established their bases in Andrelândia as internet providers and developers of online systems, from where they serve companies from all over Brazil, Europe and Latin America, such as Dream Net, Futura Web, and others.

== Urban structure ==
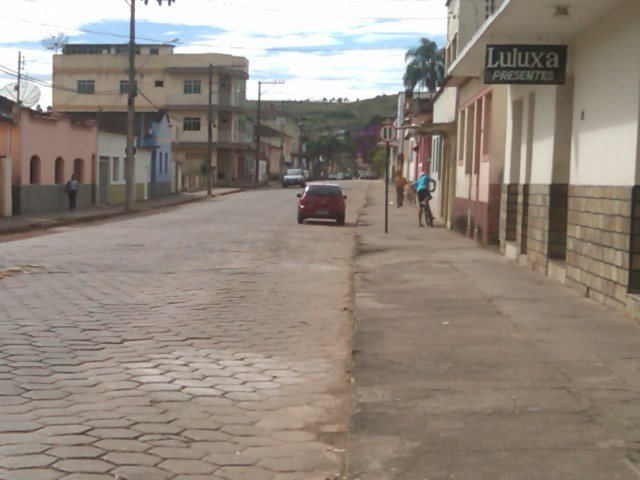
São João del-Rei Street, paved with cobblestones, typical of Andrelândia

Andrelândia has a good infrastructure. In 2000, the city had 3,442 houses, including apartments, houses and rooms. Of this total, 2,569 were owned properties, of which 2,551 were already paid for (74.11%), 18 were being acquired (0.52%), 349 were rented (10.14%), 507 properties were given away, of which 203 were given away by an employer (5.90%), 304 were given away in another way (8.83%) and 17 were given away in another way (0.49%).

The municipality has treated water, electricity, sewage, urban cleaning, fixed and cellular telephony. In 2000, 76.70% of the houses were served by the general water supply network, 68.65% of the houses had garbage collection, and 77.24% of the houses had a sanitary drain. Its Gini Index is 0.46, one of the 40 highest in the state of Minas Gerais.

In security, Andrelândia does not have such high rates of serious crime occurrences because it does not have many inhabitants. Between 2002 and 2006 the average homicide rate in the municipality was 5.4%. There were no occurrences of firearm-related deaths during this same period. The rate of traffic accident deaths, which was 8.2 increased to 32.5 in 2004, decreasing to 8.6 in 2006 and presenting an average of 13.6% between 2002 and 2006.

=== Education ===
Andrelândia has schools in all regions of the municipality. Due to intense urbanization, rural residents have easy access to schools in nearby urban neighborhoods. Education in state schools has a higher level than in municipal schools, but the municipality is creating programs to make state public education better, in order to achieve better results in the Basic Education Development Index. The municipality, in 2008, had approximately 2,676 enrollments, 167 teachers and 16 schools in the public and private networks.

In 2007, the administration expanded the infrastructure of the schools, which currently have improved service capacity for students. As a result, new transfers and investments from the federal and state governments arrived in the municipality, such as the construction of the first municipal daycare center, the expansion of the João Narciso de Oliveira Municipal School, the creation of the Agroforestry Technical School, and the construction of multi-sports courts.

Education in Andrelândia in numbers
Level	Registration	Teachers	Schools (total)
Preschool	240	22	4
Elementary School	668	107	10
Secondary education	556	24	1
Higher education	44	14	1

=== Health ===
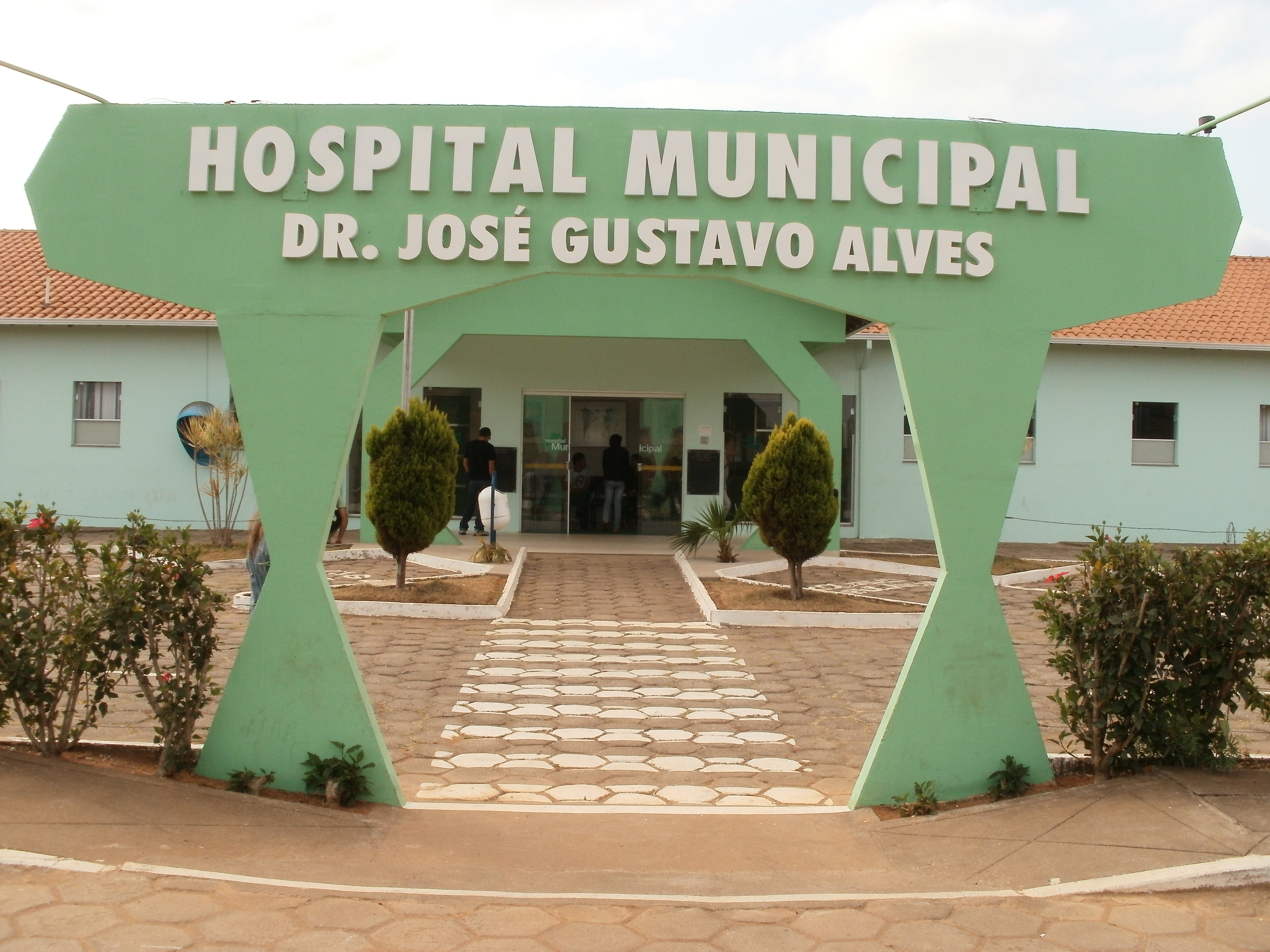
Doctor José Gustavo Alves Municipal Hospital

Until 2000, before the administration of Francisco Rivelli (2001-2008), the city had two units of the Family Health Program, both without dental care, one in the city center and the other in the Rosário neighborhood, but the service was not enough to serve the entire population. In view of this, a third unit was built in the Santos Dumont neighborhood, which today serves about 4,000 people who live in the Santos Dumont, Vila Zamoura, Chácara, Areão, and Santa Tereza neighborhoods. To further optimize the service to the population, renovations and expansions were made to the two existing units, which needed urgent maintenance.

The inauguration of the second block of the Doctor José Gustavo Alves Mixed Health Unit, which occurred on October 26, 2007, alleviated the needs of the population of Andrelândia in low and medium complexity care, urgencies and emergencies, besides care related to pregnancy and maternity. Today there are few cases referred to other locations and the Mixed Health Unit has the capacity to solve most of the pathologies that need medical care, including providing 24-hour care. According to IBGE data in 2005, the city had seven health care facilities, three of them private and four municipal, including hospitals, emergency rooms, health posts, and dental services. The city has 57 beds for hospitalization in health facilities.

=== Services and Communications ===
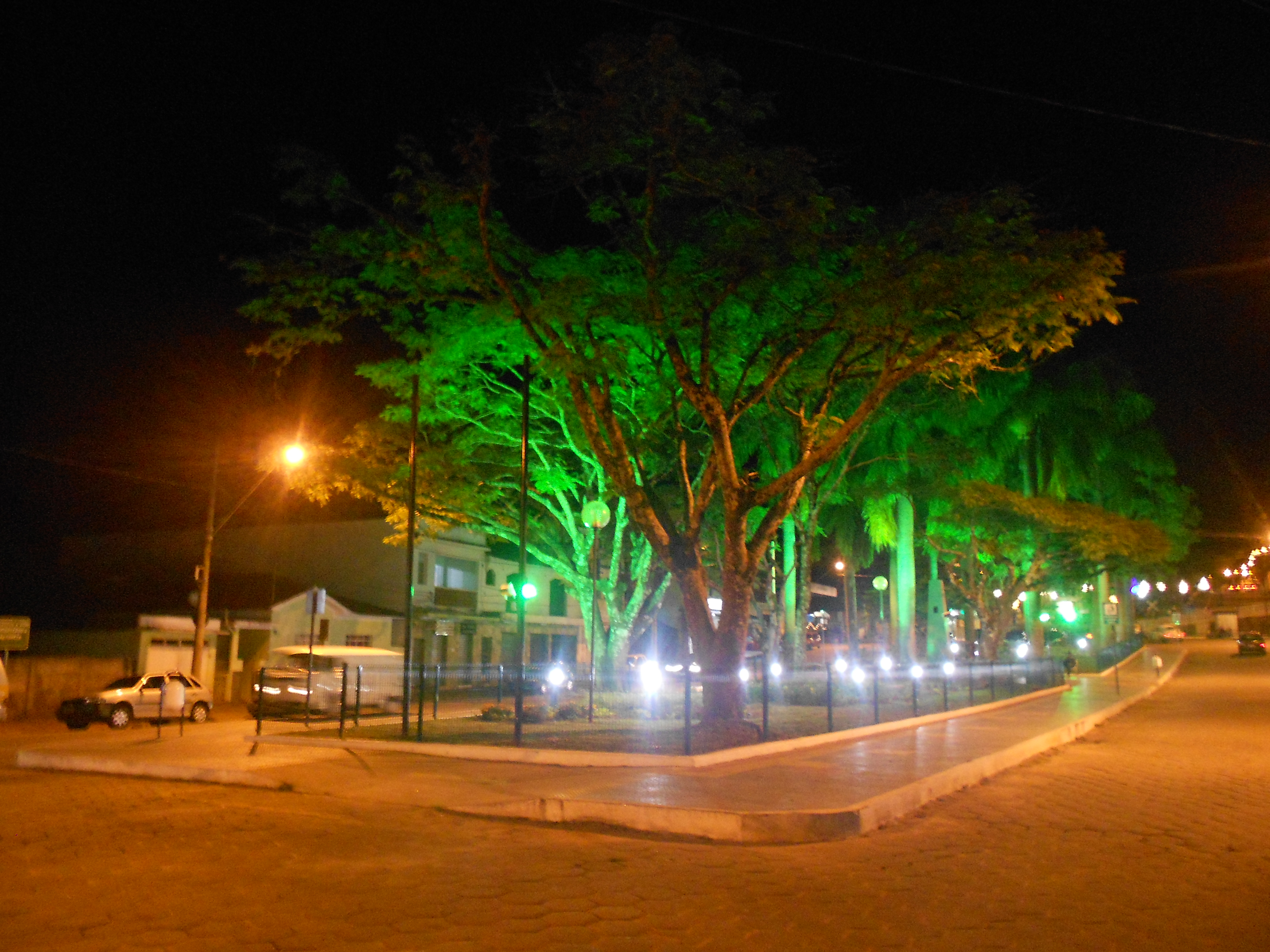
Nighttime lighting at Gabriel Ribeiro Salgado Square: the power supply is provided by Minas Gerais Energy Company (Cemig)

The water supply service, as in most of the state of Minas Gerais, is provided by the Minas Gerais Sanitation Company (Copasa). Sewage collection, on the other hand, is done by the city government itself.

In Andrelândia, as in most of the old cities of the state, the castor oil lamp was used for the internal lighting of the residences and, in the streets, it was used only on festive days, when all the windows were illuminated. The oldest reference to a public lighting system in this city is from 1881. On November 22, 1927, the Turvense Light and Power Company was bought for 90 contos de réis by the South Minas Gerais Electricity Company, which extended the transmission line to Bom Jardim de Minas, passing through Arantina. Later it was replaced by the Minas Gerais Energy Company (Cemig) which, even today, as in practically the whole state, is responsible for the city's electricity supply service. In 2003 there were 4 378 consumers and 7 173 289 KWh of energy were consumed.

There are still dial-up and broadband (ADSL) internet services being offered by various free and paid ISPs. The area code (direct distance dialing) of Andrelândia is 35 and the ZIP code of the city is 37300–000. On January 12, 2009 the city started to be served by telephone number portability, just like the other cities of area code 35. Portability is a service that makes it possible to change the operator without the need to change the number of the cell phone. In 2001 there was only one radio station according to the Minas Gerais Association of Radio and TV and Telecommunications of Minas Gerais S.A, but this number has increased over the years. Currently the main ones are Andrelândia FM and Cultura FM Radio.

=== Transports ===
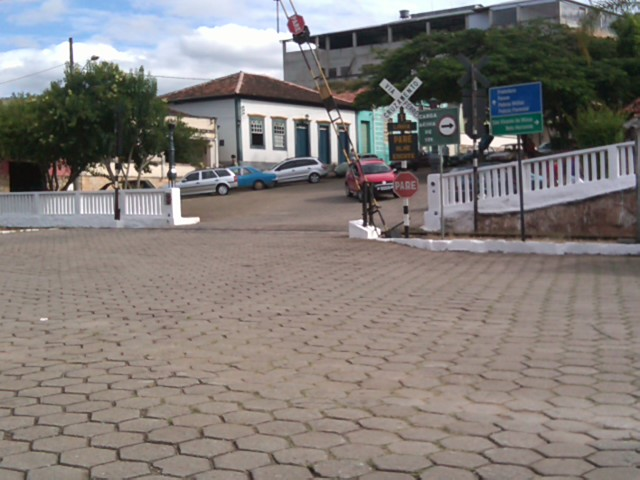
Level crossing in the City Center

As the city does not have an abundance of rivers, it does not have much tradition in waterway transport. The closest airport to Andrelândia is Major-Brigadeiro Doorgal Borges, located in Barbacena, 121 km away from the city. The municipal fleet in the year 2009 was 2,414 vehicles, being 1,648 cars, 120 trucks, four tractor trucks, 198 pickup trucks, 26 minibuses, 378 motorcycles, twenty-four scooters and sixteen buses.

The first roads in the area of the municipality appeared in the beginning of the 20th century, being only a few stones of roads that cut the territory. During the administration of Gabriel Ribeiro Salgado (1923-1926), the construction of the first road for automobiles in Andrelândia began, connecting the city to São João del-Rei. Currently, the only paved road that serves the city is BR-494 which, passing through Arantina, joins BR-267 (Juiz de Fora-Caxambu). BR-494 was paved thanks to the determination of President João Baptista de Oliveira Figueiredo, who ordered the Railway Engineering Company S/A (ENGEFER) to proceed with the paving work, when, on April 30, 1981, he was in Andrelândia to inspect the works of the Steel Railroad. A small unpaved stretch until São Vicente de Minas connects the city to the Presidente Tancredo Neves Highway, paved in almost its entire length, connecting the Historical Circuit to the Water Circuit.

Visconde de Arantes provided Andrelândia with the passage of the West of Minas Railroad, which linked São João del-Rei to the Sítio station, currently the city of Antônio Carlos. On June 14, 1914, the first locomotive of the West arrived in the city. From the 1950s on, the railroad system in the region began to feel, as in other parts of the state, the effects of the greater expansion of highways, which absorbed almost all the traffic of passengers and light freight, leaving the railroad practically limited to the transport of ore.

Andrelândia is cut by the Trunk Line of the old West of Minas Railroad, which connects the city to Araguari, northbound, and to the Rio de Janeiro cities of Barra Mansa and Angra dos Reis, southbound.

Through the railroad, besides transporting ores, for many years the city was also served by passenger transportation. Until August 1996, the Trem Mineiro of the old RFFSA, operated its trips on weekends, always presenting a great demand of passengers in the connection with Ribeirão Vermelho and Barra Mansa, causing an intense movement of them in the railway station of Andrelândia.

After the privatization of the railroad that same year, the long-distance passenger trains stopped circulating in the region and since then, there is only freight train traffic.

== Culture and leisure ==
=== Royal Road ===
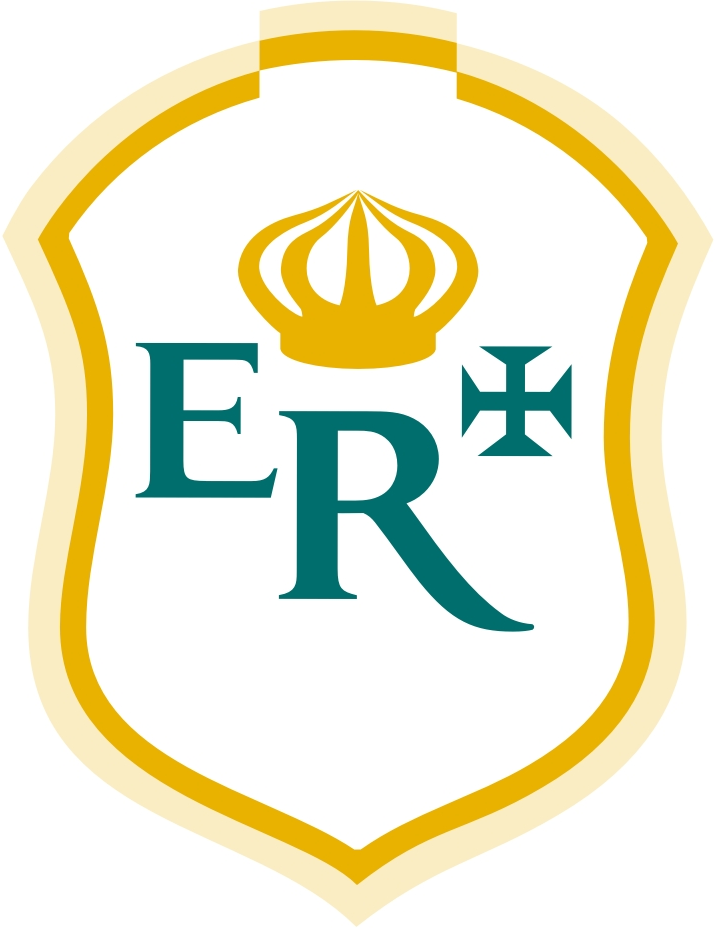
Shield for the "Estrada Real" Project

An important stretch of the Royal Road, but still little researched and explored for tourism purposes, is the Trade Path or Black River Path, a variant that was opened around the year 1813 to facilitate the transit of traders and muleteers between São João del-Rei and Rio de Janeiro. This route, which started from New Path in a stretch between the present municipalities of Paty do Alferes and Paraíba do Sul, headed towards Valença in the state of Rio de Janeiro, then went through the old mining villages of Rio Preto, Bom Jardim de Minas, Turvo (now Andrelândia), Madre de Deus de Minas, Santo Antônio do Rio das Mortes Pequeno and finally reached the village of São João del-Rei. The Trade Path is a very important variant of the Royal Road and along it there is a huge and varied number of cultural and scenic attractions, besides several places for the practice of the so-called ecotourism: The beautiful waterfalls and trout breeding ponds in the region between Rio Preto and Bom Jardim de Minas; the colonial architecture, the archaeological sites, the typical sweets and cheese and the quality cachaça produced in the region of Andrelândia; the century-old farms and churches, the mountain ranges and the folkloric traditions of the Madre de Deus de Minas region.

Recently a project of law included Andrelândia in the route of the Royal Road. To demarcate the location, several totems were placed in the municipality.

=== Architecture ===
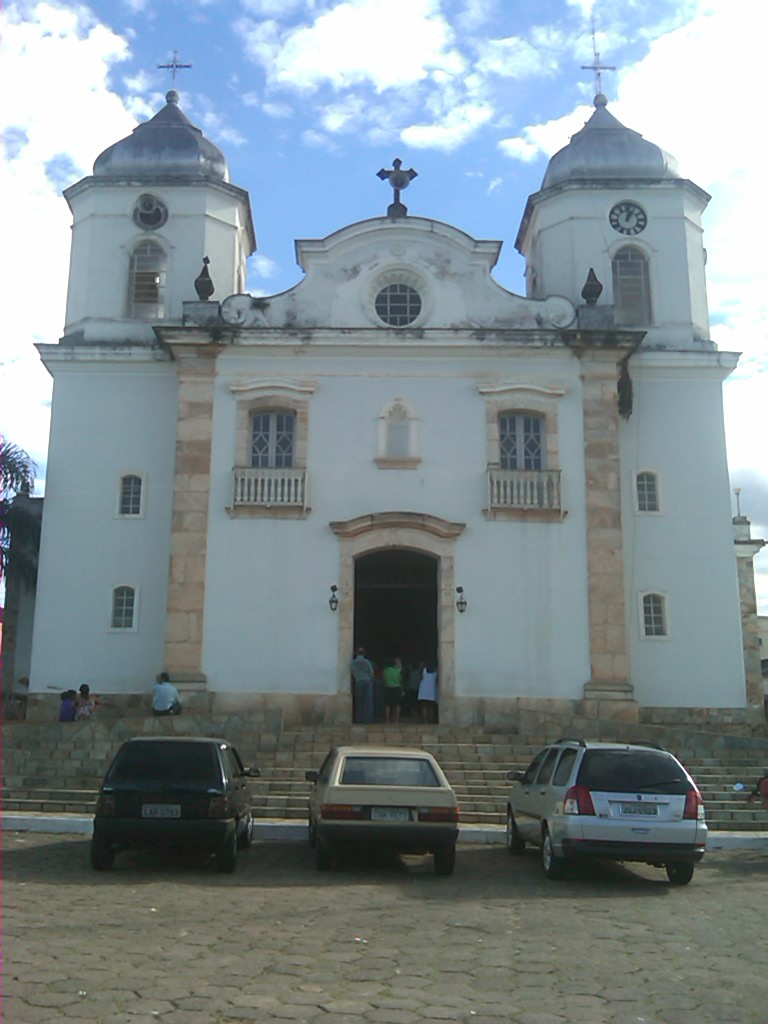
Entrance of the Mother Church of Andrelândia, Minas Gerais, Brazil

The colonial architectural complex of Andrelândia is significant, although it has already suffered very important losses such as the town hall and jail, the town house that belonged to the Baron of Cajurú, the "Passos", among many others. A serious problem is the decharacterization of many colonial houses due to the substitution of the primitive roof tiles by modern French tiles, forming a mixture of styles that has already occurred in the residences that belonged to Major Gustavo Ernesto Alves, to the Viscount of Arantes, and even with the oldest specimen of the city's colonial residential architecture, today represented by a simple remnant, with its worn stone sills denouncing the antiquity of its existence.

The city's architecture is highlighted in its centennial mansions, through the actions of the city hall and other agencies, which are concerned with the preservation of the city's history. Among its old buildings, the churches and chapels stand out, many built in the baroque style. Below is a list of the churches:

- Church of Our Lady of Porto of the Eternal Salvation: is a baroque-style Catholic church, built by André da Silveira in the center of the city. It was planned by architect Lucio Costa at the end of the 18th century. In 1890 Father Francisco Severo Malachias made the first change in the church's architecture; until that year it had no tower. A low tower was built, placed to the left of the building, which lasted until 1918. Between 1904 and 1913, some repairs were made, but only for conservation. In 1991, the last modifications were made: the replacement of the woodwork, renewal of the general painting, and some touch ups necessary for the conservation of the temple.
- Church of Our Lady of the Rosary: there is a lot of conjecture about the time when the church was built, but it is possible to believe that it didn't happen before 1817, when D. João VI, king of the United Kingdom of Portugal, Brazil and the Algarves, who was staying in Rio de Janeiro with the royal family, fleeing the Napoleonic invasions in Europe, granted permission for the slaves to build the church.
- Church of Saint Benedict: is located in the Areão neighborhood. It was built under the guidance of Father José Tibúrcio and its history can be accurately known through the words of the vicar himself in a text that he prepared on the eve of the consecration of this temple. It was inaugurated on September 27, 1936, when the image of the patron saint, Saint Benedict, was transferred from the Mother Church to this church, where it remained until the chapel was torn down and the current church was built. It has modern architecture, imitating the welcoming gesture of Jesus Christ.

=== Handicraft ===
Handicraft is one of the most spontaneous forms of cultural expression in Andrelândia. In various parts of the city, it is possible to find a differentiated handicraft production, made with regional raw materials and created according to the local culture and way of life. This diversity makes the local handicrafts rich and creative. The Association of Artisans of Andrelândia brings together several artisans from the region, making space available for making, exhibiting and selling their handmade products. They produce especially crocheted bedspreads and table runners, flowers produced with dry corn leaf, and pieces produced with looms, among others.

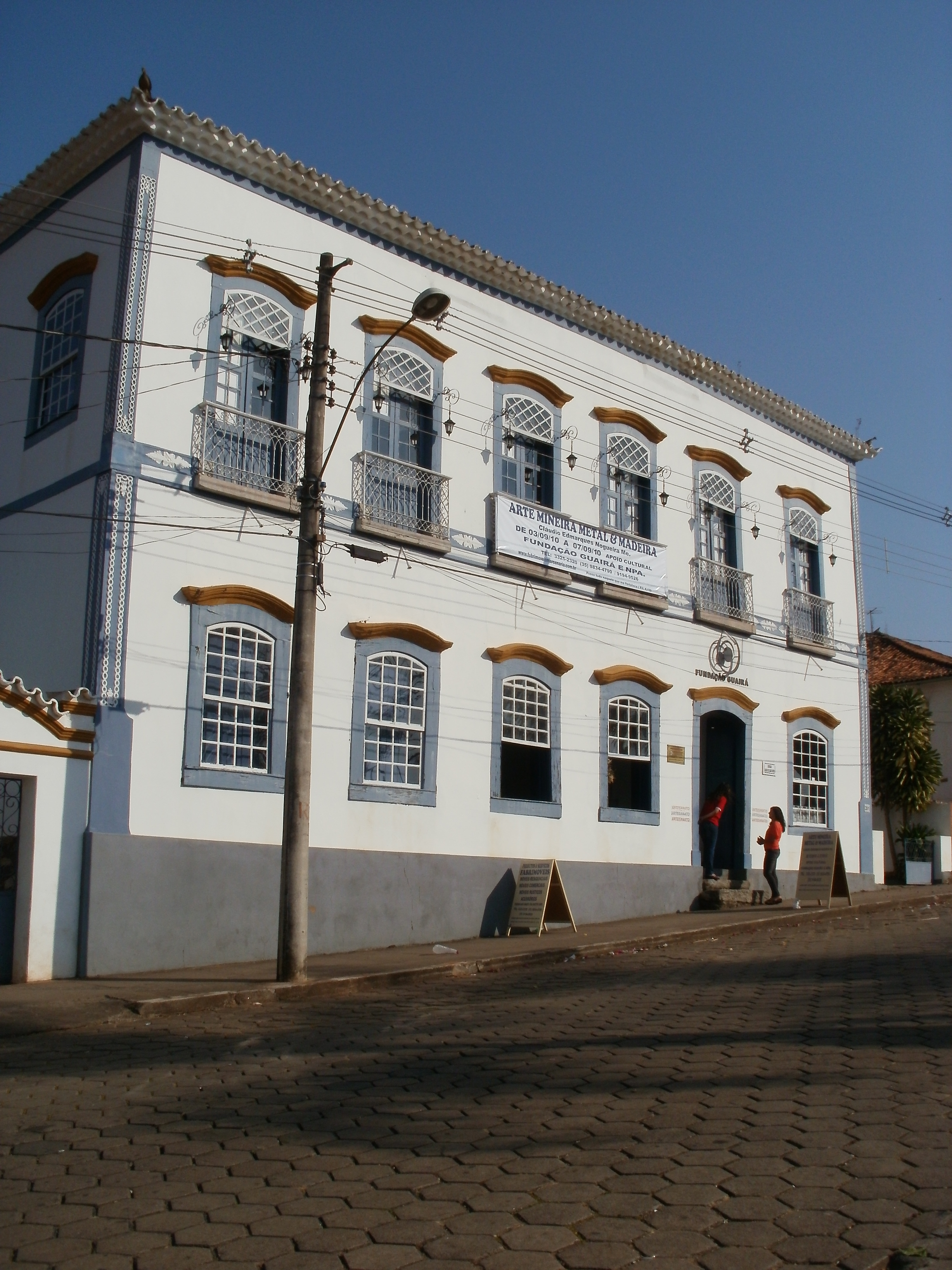
Guairá Foundation, home of handcrafted artifacts in Andrelândia

Usually these pieces are sold at fairs, exhibitions or craft stores. The "Casa do Artesanato" (English: House of Handicraft) represents the point of exhibition and sale of various pieces produced by Andrelândia's artisans. An important sponsor of handicrafts in the municipality is the Social Assistance Reference Center, a project organized by the municipality involving families at risk, who work to strengthen family and community ties. It offers courses in handicrafts, cold porcelain and recycling projects using newspapers, garlic and onion peelings and vegetable fibers.

=== Music ===
The music of Brazil was formed mainly from the fusion of European and African elements, brought by the Portuguese colonizers and slaves respectively. The first records of consistent musical activity in Brazil come from the activity of the Jesuit priests, established in the country since 1549. In Andrelândia, besides the most common musical styles in Brazil, classical music also stands out.

In Andrelândia, throughout the years, several bands based in the city have stood out regionally, with emphasis on the classical style groups, such as the 15 de Agosto, Santa Cecília, the Musical Corporation "Irmãos Leite", besides the Andrelandense Musical Society Saint Pius X, today known as Saint Pius X Band, founded by maestro Rufino on March 4, 1955, and exists until today, being conducted by maestro Wilson Pereira. It was declared of Municipal Public Utility by Municipal Law No. 716 of October 14, 1985 and entity of State Public Utility, according to Law No. 9.203 of June 24, 1986. The corporation has always been present in various cultural, historical, civil and religious moments of Andrelândia and region.

=== Events ===
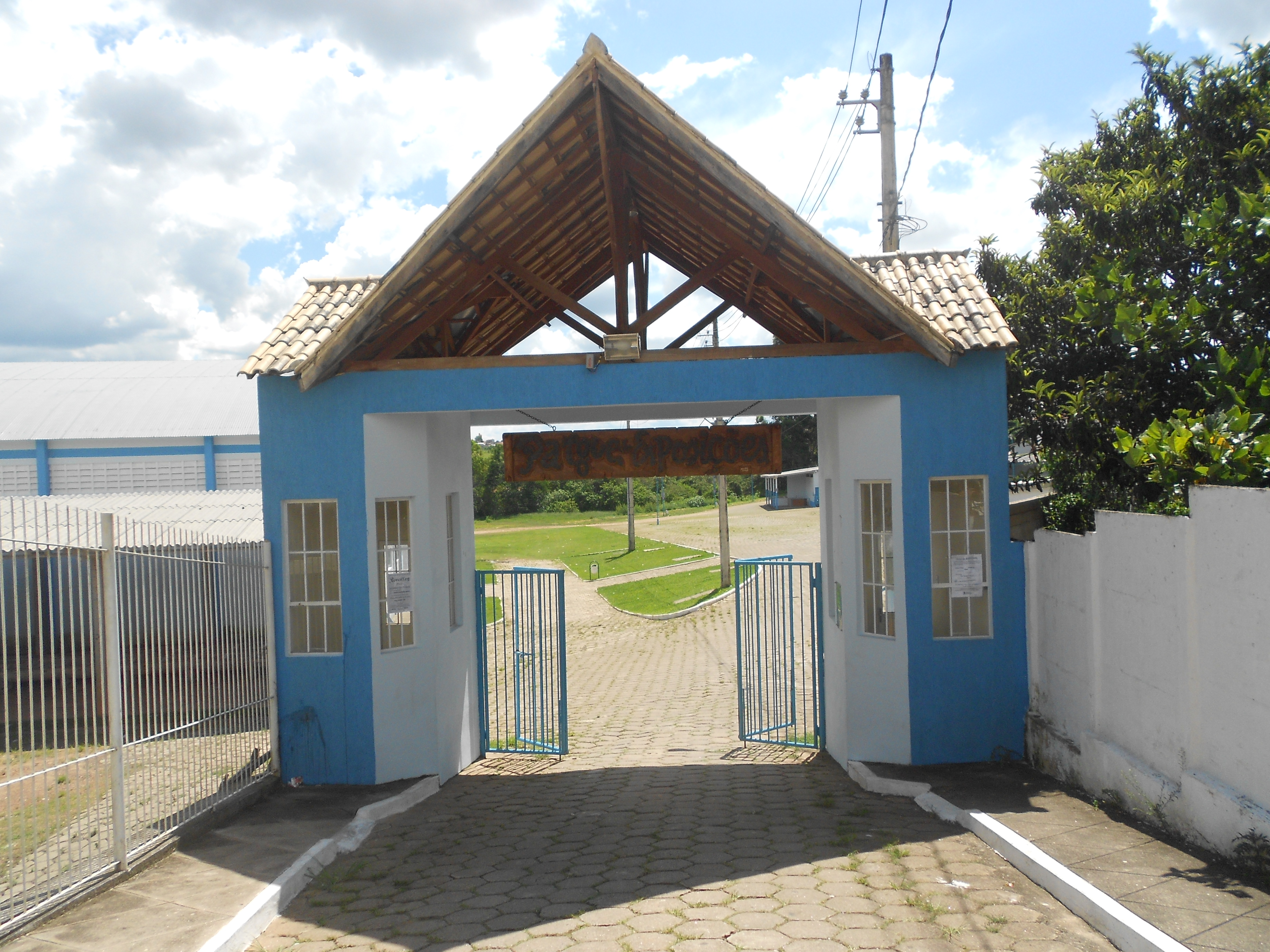
Entrance to the Exhibition Park of Andrelândia, where the city's main events are usually held

To stimulate the local socioeconomic development, the Andrelândia City Hall, together or not with local companies, invests in the parties and events segment. These parties often attract people from other cities, requiring a better infrastructure in the municipality and stimulating the professionalization of the sector, which is beneficial not only to tourists, but also to the entire population of the city. The activities take place throughout the year, especially during religious holidays.

==== Religious celebrations ====
They are held during the periods of religious celebrations throughout the year. The main religious events in Andrelândia are the Feast of Saint Sebastian and the Feast of Kings, in January; Holy Week, in March or April; the Feast of Saint Benedict, in May; Corpus Christi, in June and the Patron Saint's Feast, in August.

==== Andrefolia ====
The Andrelândia Carnival is the most popular festival in the city. It is celebrated in the Visconde de Arantes Square, popularly known as the forum square, with matinês (parade of carnival blocks), music shows and the Saint Pius X Band. Andrefolia takes people through the streets and makes the revelers happy. The most traditional blocks in the municipality are: Nem Ligo do Areão, Unidos do São Dimas, Confetes ao Vento, and Das Virgens. In some editions, it has attracted more than 10,000 people.

==== Visconde de Arantes Commandery ====
Established by Municipal Law 1 311/2002, the Commandery honors annually, on July 20, the anniversary of the city's foundation, up to ten citizens in the political, business, social, and cultural fields, who have rendered exceptional services to the local community. The commandery ceremony brings together several local personalities.

==== Farming and Cattle Raising Exhibition of Andrelândia ====
It is held annually on September 7 at the José Athaíde de Oliveira Exhibition Park. It is the largest festival in the city, with an average attendance of about 30,000 people. In the last few years, the structure of the Exhibition Park has been remodeled and expanded to receive a larger number of tourists and more exhibitors. The party lasts five days and has as its trademark, shows by big names in the Brazilian music scene.

=== Sports ===
As in most of the cities in the country, the most popular sport is soccer, despite its little tradition. In fact, only in schools is sport given its due value as integration and health, even then in a very restricted scope, in physical education classes. Throughout the year small soccer clubs in the city or region, in partnership with the city hall and with the sponsorship of local companies, organize amateur competitions, such as the Regional Soccer Championship, which is the championship with the greatest scope and breadth of participation. Usually, there are a total of 20 teams from several cities in the region.

In schools, the city government, together with the State Secretariat of Sports and Youth (SEEJ) and the Municipal Secretariat of Industry, Commerce and Tourism organize several multi-sport events involving children and teenagers from several schools. The goal of these activities is social inclusion through sports, expanding the integral formation and ensuring access to sports, pedagogical, and recreational practices, in addition to health promotion and nutritional complementation.

=== Holidays ===
In Andrelândia, there are three municipal holidays, eight national holidays and four optional points. The municipal holidays are: Corpus Christi, always held on the Thursday following Holy Trinity Sunday, the anniversary of the emancipation of Andrelândia on July 20, and the Assumption of Our Lady on August 15. According to law Nº 9.093 of September 12, 1995, municipalities can have a maximum of four municipal holidays, including Good Friday.

== See also ==
- List of municipalities in Minas Gerais
