= Immediate Geographic Region of Caxambu-Baependi =

Urban administrative region in Minas Gerais, Brazil

The Immediate Geographic Region of Caxambu-Baependi is one of the 10 immediate geographic regions in the Intermediate Geographic Region of Pouso Alegre, one of the 70 immediate geographic regions in the Brazilian state of Minas Gerais and one of the 509 of Brazil, created by the National Institute of Geography and Statistics (IBGE) in 2017.

== Municipalities ==
It comprises 8 municipalities.

- Aiuruoca
- Baependi
- Carvalhos
- Caxambu
- Cruzília
- Minduri
- Seritinga
- Serranos
