= Madre de Deus (disambiguation) =

Madre de Deus was a Portuguese treasure ship captured by English privateers in 1592.

Madre de Deus (Portuguese for Mother of God) may also refer to:

== Municipalities in Brazil ==
- Madre de Deus, Bahia
- Madre de Deus de Minas, Minas Gerais
- Brejo da Madre de Deus, Pernambuco

== Buildings and landmarks ==
- Monastery of Madre de Deus, a location of the National Azulejo Museum in Lisbon, Portugal
- Madre de Deus Convent, a former convent and church, now the National Museum of the Azulejo in Lisbon, Portugal
- Madre de Deus Manor, a landmark in the Azores, Portugal
- Mother of God Church, Vettukad, Kerala, India

== Other ==
- Filipe da Madre de Deus (ca.1630–1688x90) Portuguese composer
- An alternate name for the Portuguese ship Nossa Senhora da Graça

== See also ==
- Madredeus, a Portuguese musical ensemble
- Madre de Dios (disambiguation) same title in Spanish
