= Bom Jardim de Minas =

- Municipality
- The Municipality of Bom Jardim de Minas
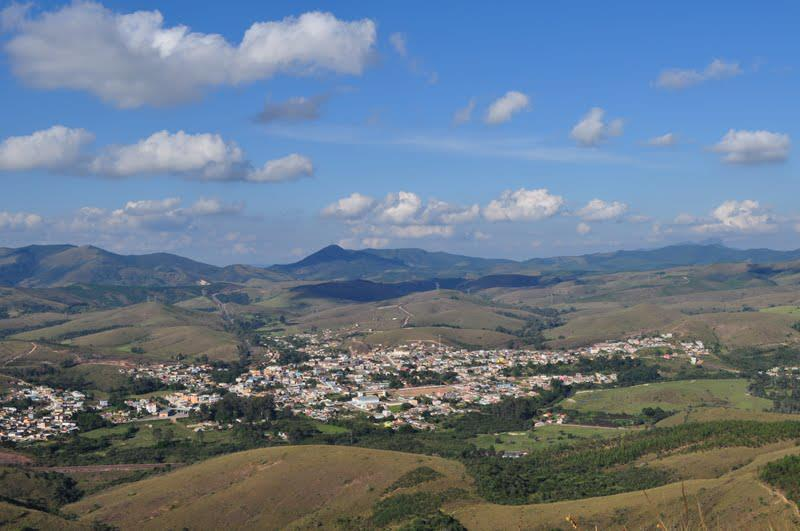
- View of Bom Jardim de Minas

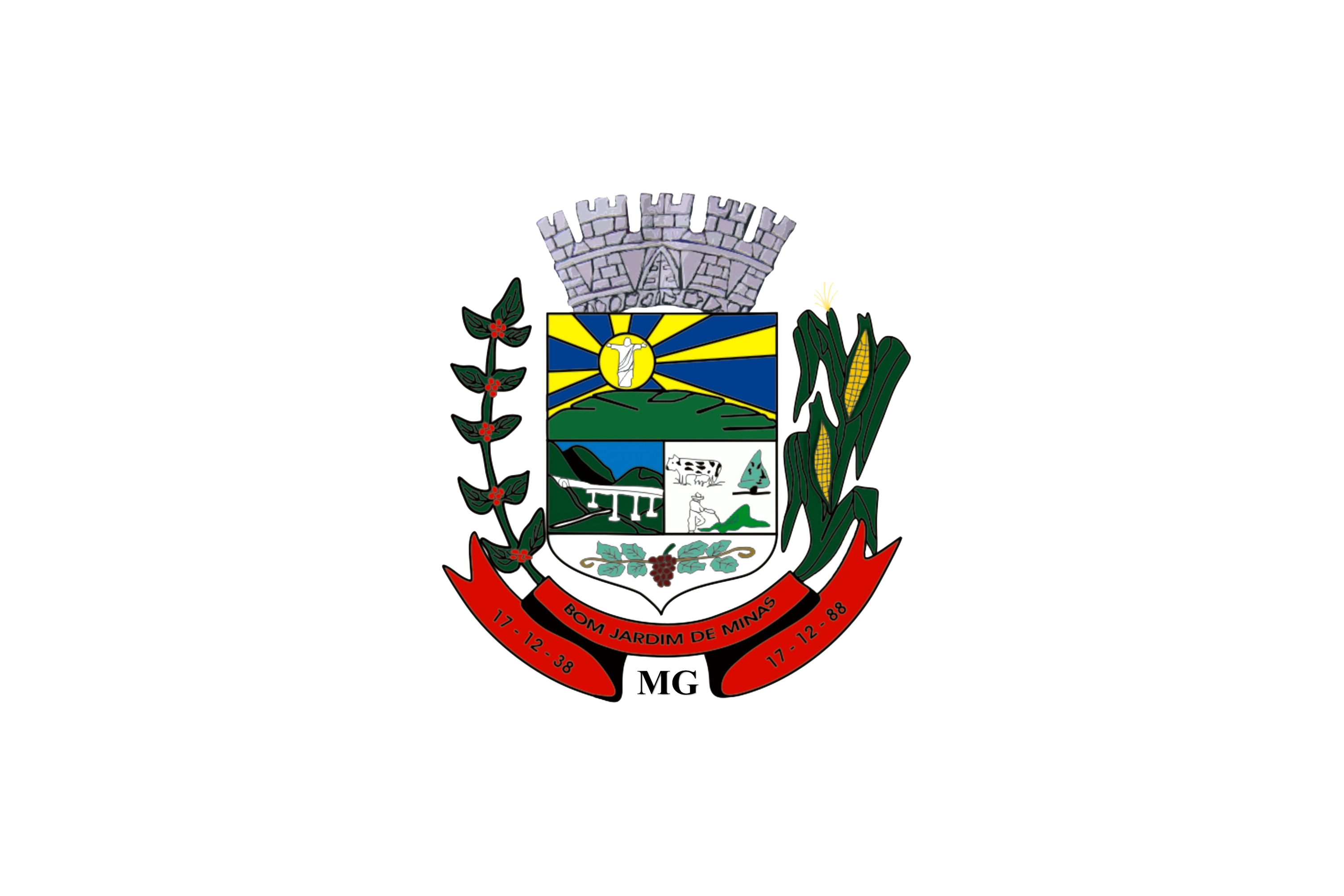
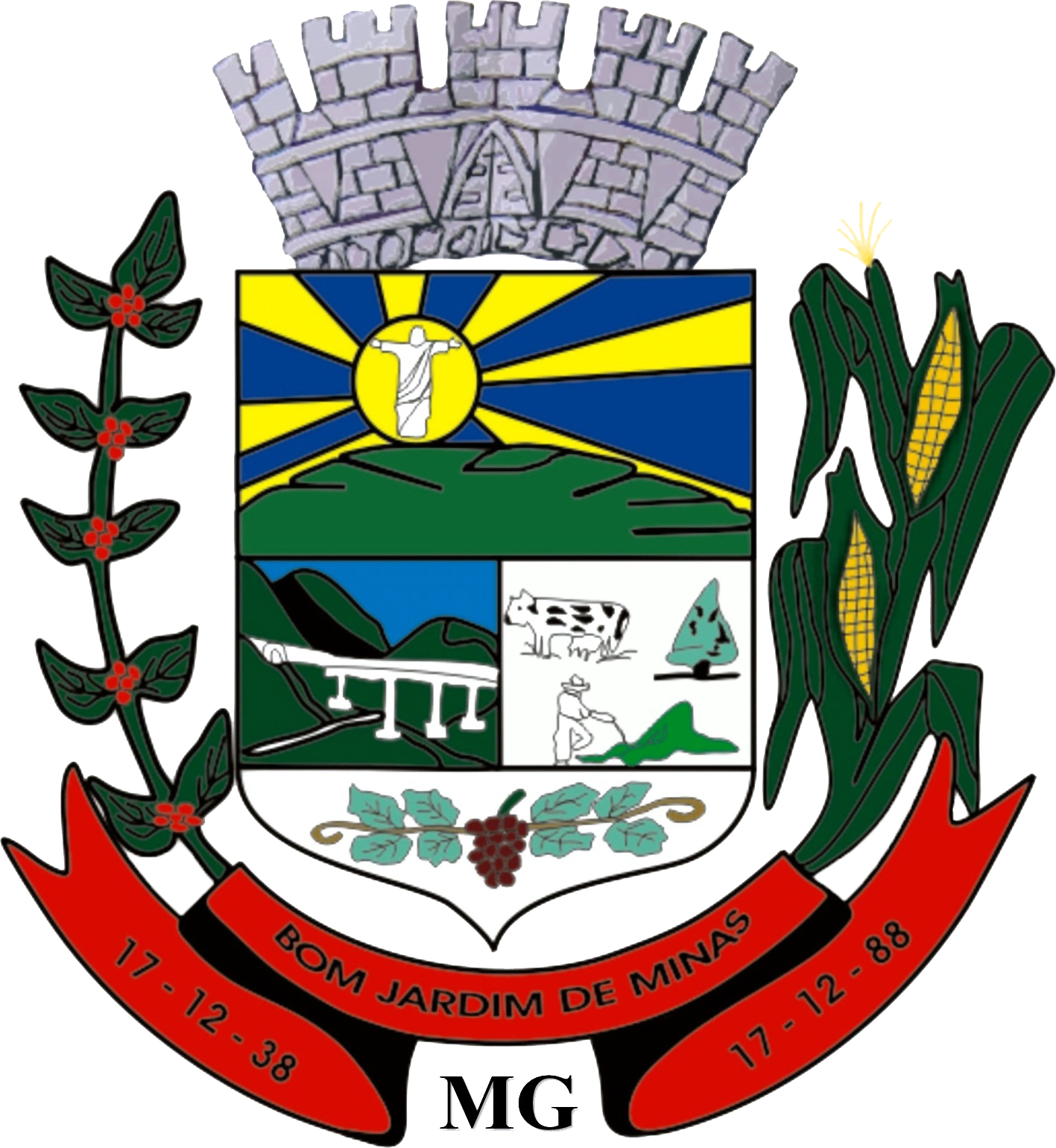
- Flag Coat of arms
- Nickname: BJM
- Motto: Omnis gloriam Dei
- Location in Brazil
- Coordinates: 21°56′15″S 41°00′58″W
- Country: Brazil
- Region: Southeast
- State: Minas Gerais
- Incorporated: December 17, 1937

Government
  - Mayor: José Francisco Matos e Silva, PSD

Area
  - Total: 395 km^{2} (153 sq mi)
- Elevation: 1,119 m (3,671 ft)

Population (2020)
  - Total: 6,459
  - Density: 15/km^{2} (39/sq mi)
- Time zone: UTC−3 (BRT)
- Postal Code: 37310-000
- Area code: +55 32
- Website: Bom Jardim de Minas, Minas Gerais

Bom Jardim de Minas is a city of the state of Minas Gerais, Brazil.

The name means Good Garden of Minas (Gerais).

It is situated in the southern part of Minas Gerais and in the middle of the Mantiqueira Mountains, at 1,200 meters high, which gives the city a mild climate.

The only paved road that reaches Bom Jardim de Minas is the BR-267, which connects the city to the southern part of the State of Minas Gerais and the region of Juiz de Fora.

Population: 6,459 inhabitants.

It was founded in 1770 with the formation of a farm land in current city. When it came near the farm houses, became a parish and then the district with the installation of the chapel on May 2, 1856. And finally, in 1938, the district was upgrade to city, with two districts, headquarters and Taboão.

Currently, the city has been increasing in the festivities such as Carnival. An agricultural exhibition in May, and a feast in honour of Jesus Christ in August. Along with the natural attractions of waterfalls and mountain scenery these contribute to the tourism industry of the city.

== History ==
In 1770 Arriaga Manoel de Oliveira, accompanied by his wife and six children, founded the Colony of Campo Vermelho near the current city. They were attacked by a tribe of Indians who inhabited the region and during the attack one of his sons was killed. Manoel Arriaga, very saddened by the fact, turned away from the colony and settled on the banks of the Milho Branco stream where he set up a farm which in time became the city.

Years later, Manoel Arriaga was visited by the illustrious Captain Antonio Correia de Lacerda and his family. He joined with Manoel Arriaga in expanding the farm and beginning the cultivation of land on a large scale.

At the request of Captain Lacerda the chapel of Bom Jardim, today the old parish church, was erected in the village centre.

Some years later, with the union of families Arriaga and Lacerda, the farm received the name "Fazenda do Bom Jardim". The origin of the name was due to a well maintained garden near the farmhouse.

In 1856 the village of Senhor Bom Jesus do Bom Jardim was instituted by provincial Law No. 761 of May 2 as belonging to the municipality of Turvo.

The effect of State Law No. 843 of 7 September 1923 was to rename the District to "Bom Jardim" but continuing to belong to the municipality of Turvo. Soon after, under State Law No. 1160, the City of Turvo had its name changed to Andrelândia. The Municipality with the name of Bom Jardim, was created by Decree-State Law No. 148 of December 17, 1938. It consisted of two districts: the headquarters, originally part of the Municipality of Andrelândia, and Taboão from the city of Rio Preto. By Decree-State Law No. 1058 of 31 December 1943 the City of Bom Jardim changed its name to Bom Jardim de Minas and included the new district of Arantina, split off from the District Headquarters. In 1962 Arantina was emancipated and Bom Jardim de Minas reverted to having the two districts of Headquarters and Taboão.

== Geography ==
The area of the municipality is 395 square kilometers (153 mi^{2}), representing 0.07% of the state, the region 0.045% and 0.005% of the entire Brazilian territory. Located on the banks of the Rio Grande in the southern region of the state of Minas Gerais, and the Serra da Mantiqueira.

It is located 281 kilometers (175 miles) from Belo Horizonte, the state capital. The relief of the municipality consists of plateaus, with an average elevation of 1,100 meters, however, this average decreases toward the Rio Grande, to form the lowland rain that is circumvented by the "sea of hills and mountains," with higher topographic level. The highest point is the Serra da Bandeira in Taboão at elevation of 1733 meters.

The region consists of many Taboão high elevation mountains with many water springs, which means that there are several waterfalls in the region. The headwaters of the Rio do Peixe, one of the largest rivers in the region, located in the hills district Taboão.

=== Climate ===
The city has mesothermal highland tropical climate, with cold and dry winter rains and higher, taking into account the situation of latitude and elevation ranging from 990 m to 1733 m. According to regional averages, the winter is hardly unpleasant unless one or the other day, the coldest month, July, has averaged approximately 55 °F and 61 °F, daily maximum of 71 °F and 73 °F and minimum of 41 °F to 50 °F and may reach even with minimum absolute in Celsius Scale up to 0 °C (32 °C), and may even gear.

== Mayors of Bom Jardim de Minas ==
This list composes all the mayors of the city of Bom Jardim de Minas, with their respective years since the birth of the city in 1938.

Mayors of Bom Jardim de Minas
Term no.	Mayor name	Term span
1	Americo Ferreira Pena	1939–1946
2	Joaquim A. Souza Correia	1946–1948
3	Assis Rodrigues da Silva	1948–1951
4	Geraldo Andrade	1951–1955
5	José Landim (1st term)	1955–1959
6	Octaviano Nardy Ribeiro	1959–1963
7	José Landim (2nd term)	1963–1967
8	Orlando Altomare de Carvalho	1967–1971
9	José Bougleux de Andrade	1971–1972
10	Itacy Bougleux de Andrade	1972–1973
11	Dimas Abbud	1973–1977
12	Octaviano Nardy Ribeiro (2nd term)	1977–1982
13	Sebastiao Delgado de Almeida	1983–1988
14	Manoel Rodrigues	1989–1992
15	Valtencir de Paula Nunes (1st term)	1993–1996
16	Genivaldo Marques de Paula	1997–2000
17	Valtencir de Paula Nunes (2nd term)	2001–2024
18	Carlos Roberto Marques	2005–2008
19	Joaquim Laercio Rodrigues (1st term)	2009–2012
20	Joaquim Laercio Rodrigues (2nd term)	2013–2016
21	Sérgio Martins	2017–2020
22	Joaquim Laercio Rodrigues (3rd term)	2021–2023
23	José Francisco Matos e Silva	2023

== See also ==
- List of municipalities in Minas Gerais
