= José Murilo de Carvalho =

Brazilian historian (1939–2023)

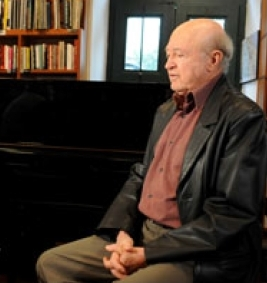
- Carvalho in 2011
- Born: 8 September 1939; Andrelândia, Minas Gerais, Brazil
- Died: 13 August 2023 (aged 83); Rio de Janeiro, Brazil
- Education: Federal University of Minas Gerais
- Occupations: Writer; historian

José Murilo de Carvalho (8 September 1939 – 13 August 2023) was a Brazilian historian and professor.

He obtained his PhD in political science from Stanford University, defending a thesis on the Brazilian Empire. He was professor emeritus at the Federal University of Rio de Janeiro and also taught at the Federal University of Minas Gerais.

He was a visiting professor and researcher at the universities of Oxford, Leiden, Stanford, California (Irvine), London, Notre Dame, at the Institute for Advanced Study in Princeton, New Jersey, and at the Ortega y Gasset Foundation in Madrid.

Carvalho published and organized 19 books and more than 100 magazine articles. He was a member of the Brazilian Academy of Sciences and the Brazilian Academy of Letters, where he was the sixth occupant of Chair 5. He was elected to the Brazilian Academy of Letters on 11 March 2004, in succession to Rachel de Queiroz and was received on 10 September 2004 by the academic Affonso Arinos de Mello Franco.

José Murilo de Carvalho died of COVID-19 in Rio de Janeiro, on 13 August 2023, at the age of 83.
