= Madre de Dios =

Madre de Dios may refer to:

- Spanish for Mother of God, Christian title for Mary, the mother of Jesus
- Madre de Dios Province, Bolivia
- Madre de Dios Island, Chile
- Madre de Dios Terrane, Chile
- Madre de Dios Mine, Chile
- Madre de Dios Department, Peru
- Madre de Dios River, Peru
- Madre de Dios (album), a 2001 album by Dozer

== See also ==
- Madre de Deus (disambiguation), same title in Portuguese
