= Passa-Vinte =

- Municipality
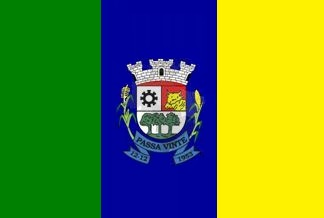
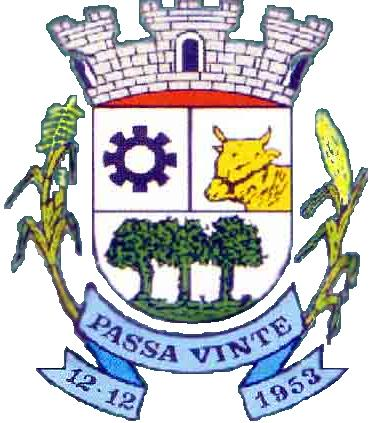
- Flag Coat of arms

- Location in Brazil
- Coordinates: 22°12′32″S 44°14′2″W
- Country: Brazil
- Region: Southeast
- State: Minas Gerais
- Mesoregion: Sudoeste de Minas

Government
  - Mayor: Lucas Nascimento de Almeida (PV)

Population (2020)
  - Total: 2,031
- Time zone: UTC−3 (BRT)

Passa-Vinte is a municipality in the state of Minas Gerais in the Southeast region of Brazil.

== See also ==
- List of municipalities in Minas Gerais
