= Bocaina de Minas =

- Municipality
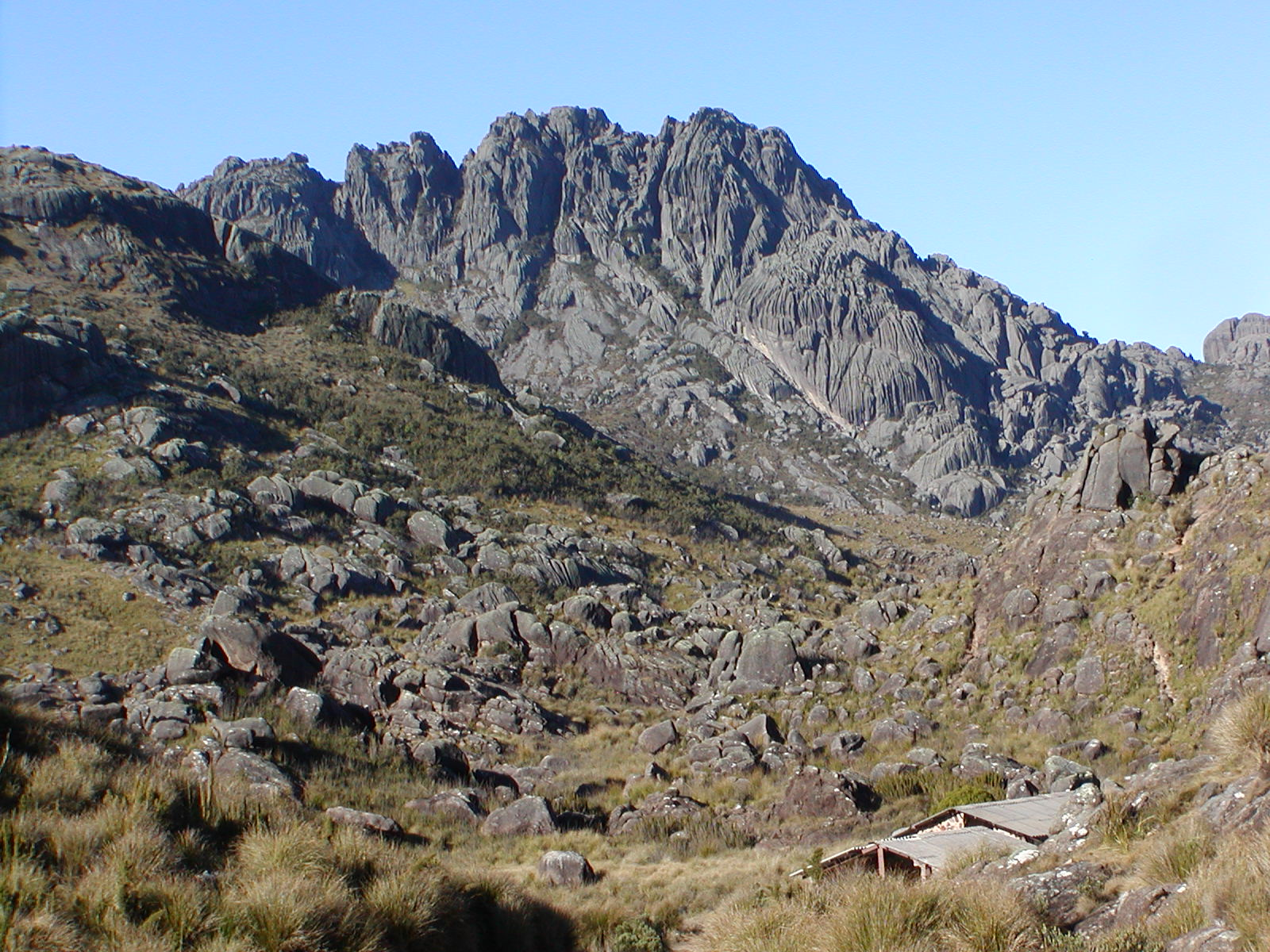

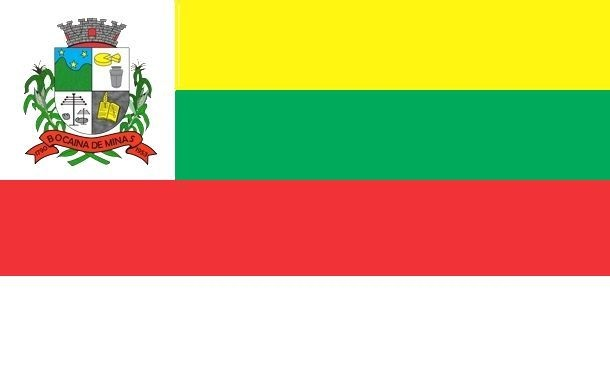
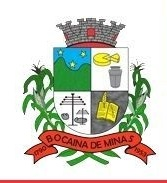
- Flag Coat of arms

- Location in Brazil
- Coordinates: 22°10′S 44°24′W
- Country: Brazil
- Region: Southeast
- State: Minas Gerais
- Mesoregion: Oeste de Minas

Population (2020)
  - Total: 5,089
- Time zone: UTC−3 (BRT)

Bocaina de Minas is a municipality in the state of Minas Gerais in the Southeast region of Brazil.

== See also ==
- List of municipalities in Minas Gerais
