= São Vicente de Minas =

- Municipality
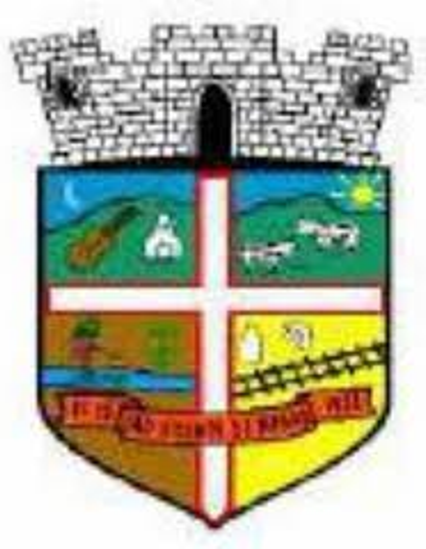
- Coat of arms

- Location in Brazil
- Coordinates: 21°42′46″S 44°26′38″W
- Country: Brazil
- Region: Southeast
- State: Minas Gerais
- Mesoregion: Sudoeste de Minas

Population (2020)
  - Total: 7,815
- Time zone: UTC−3 (BRT)

São Vicente de Minas is a municipality in the state of Minas Gerais in the Southeast region of Brazil.

== Geography ==
According to IBGE (2017), the municipality belongs to the Immediate Geographic Region of São João del-Rei, in the Intermediate Geographic Region of Barbacena.

=== Ecclesiastical circumscription ===
The municipality is part of the Roman Catholic Diocese of São João del-Rei.

== See also ==
- List of municipalities in Minas Gerais
