= Ribeirão Vermelho =

Town and municipality in the state of Minas Gerais, Brazil

Coordinates: 21°11′27″S 45°03′43″W

- Municipality
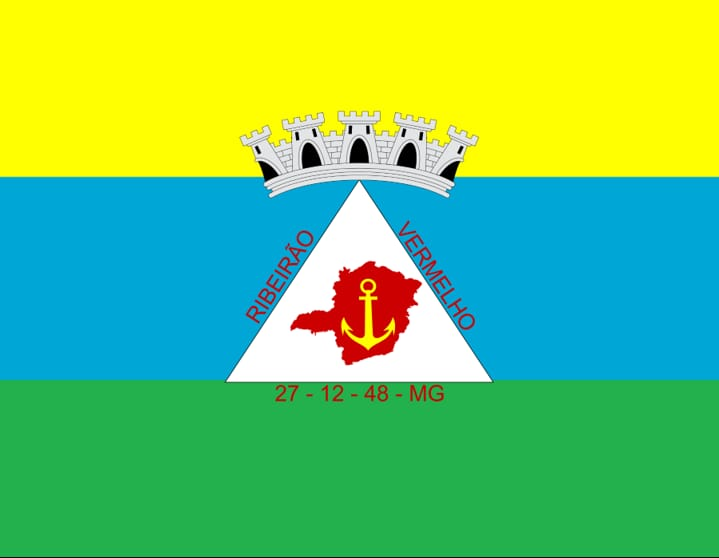
- Flag
- Interactive map of Ribeirão Vermelho
- Country: Brazil
- State: Minas Gerais
- Region: Southeast
- Time zone: UTC−3 (BRT)

Location of Ribeirão Vermelho within Minas Gerais

Ribeirão Vermelho is a Brazilian municipality located in the state of Minas Gerais. The city belongs to the mesoregion of Campo das Vertentes and to the microregion of Lavras. In 2020, the estimated population was 4,047.

== See also ==
- List of municipalities in Minas Gerais
