= Santana do Garambéu =

Town and municipality in the state of Minas Gerais, Brazil

Coordinates: 21°36′03″S 44°06′14″W

- Municipality
- Coat of arms
- Interactive map of Santana do Garambéu
- Country: Brazil
- State: Minas Gerais
- Region: Southeast

Population (2022 Census)
  - Total: 2,137
  - Estimate (2025): 2,171
- Time zone: UTC−3 (BRT)

Location of Santana do Garambéu within Minas Gerais

Santana do Garambéu is a Brazilian municipality that is located in the state of Minas Gerais. The city belongs to the mesoregion of Campo das Vertentes and to the microregion of Sao Joao del Rei. In 2025, the estimated population was 2,171.

== See also ==
- List of municipalities in Minas Gerais
