= Our Lady of Vendôme =

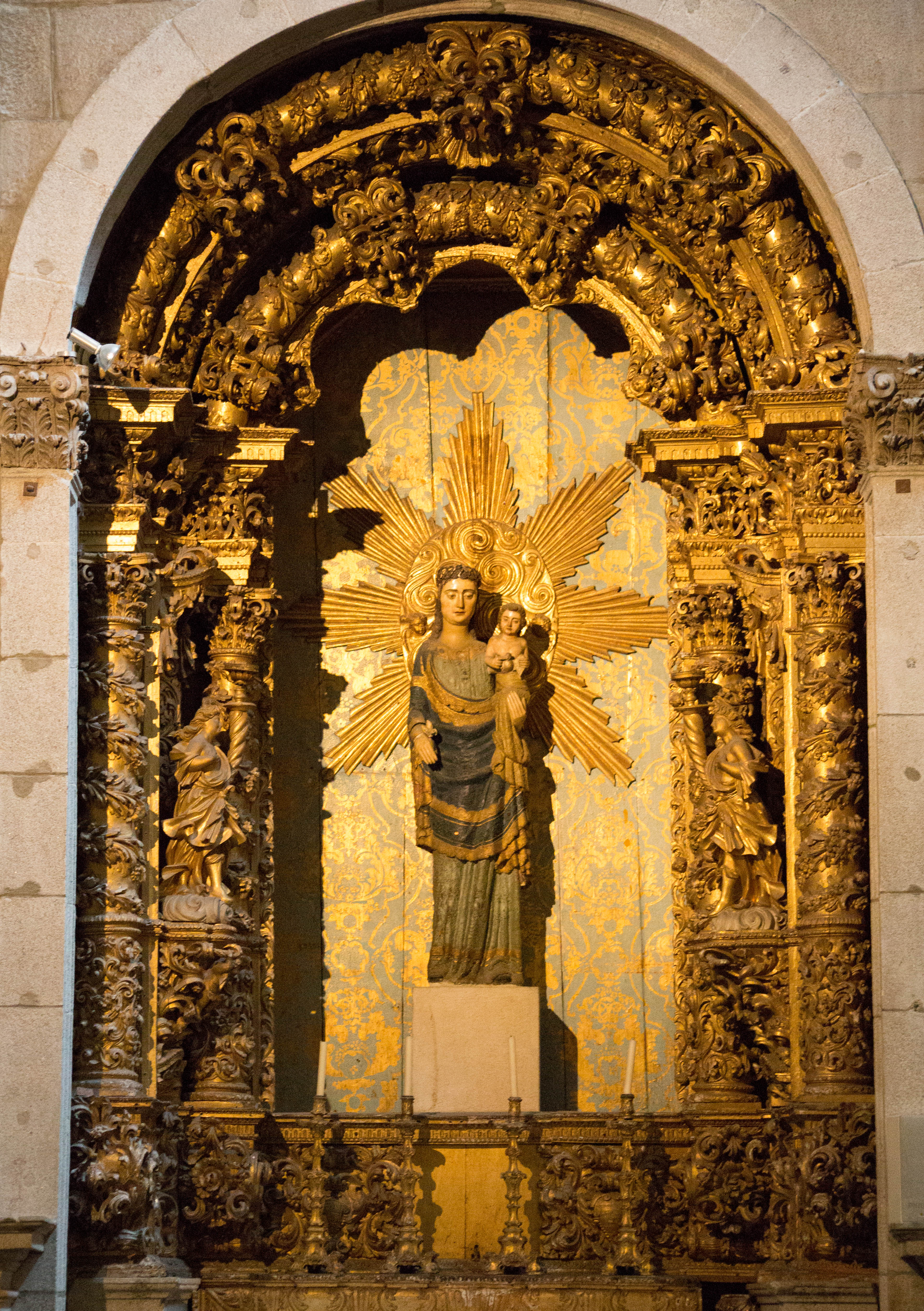
- Our Lady of Vendôme, Porto Cathedral
- Venerated in: Roman Catholic Church
- Major shrine: Cathedral of the Assumption of Our Lady, Porto
- Attributes: Blessed Virgin Mary, Infant Jesus
- Patronage: Porto

Our Lady of Vendôme (Portuguese: Nossa Senhora de Vandoma), also known in Portuguese as Our Lady of Porto or Our Lady of Porto of the Eternal Salvation, is a title of the Blessed Virgin Mary, of particular historical veneration in the city of Porto, Portugal, of which she is the patroness saint. As a sign of this devotion, Our Lady of Vendôme features in the coat of arms of Porto.

== History ==
The devotion to Our Lady of Vendôme has its origins in the period of the Reconquista, and is associated with an historical episode popularly known as the Army of the Gascons (Portuguese: Armada dos Gascões). Around the year 990, nobleman Munio Viegas led an army of knights from Gascony that had disembarked on the mouth of the Douro River to fight the Moors who at the time ruled Porto. With the knights came a French prelate, Nonegus (often referred to as a "Bishop of Vendôme", although that city was never the seat of an episcopal see) who had brought along a stone image of Our Lady that had originally been in the city of Vendôme.

Following the Christian victory over the Moors, as an act of thanksgiving for the intercession of the Blessed Virgin in the battle, the city was dedicated to the Virgin Mary as Civitas Virginis (the city of the Virgin), and put under the patronage of Our Lady of Vendôme. Munio Viegas and the Gascons are credited with having rebuilt the city walls: the image of Our Lady of Vendôme was placed over one of its main gates, which was christened the Door of Vendôme (Portuguese: Porta de Vandoma).

The image was venerated by the city's population throughout the centuries, and was particularly invoked during epidemics.

The original image of Our Lady of Vendôme is now in the Cathedral of the Assumption of Our Lady, Porto. The Door of Vendôme (which location shifted to the city centre as Porto grew through the centuries) was demolished in 1855.
