= Rio Preto, Minas Gerais =

Rio Preto
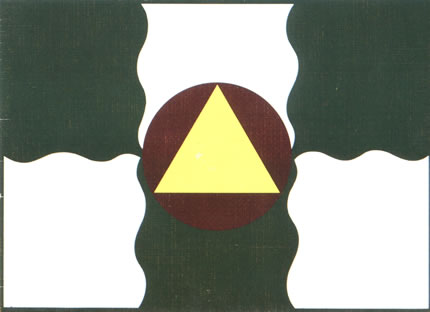
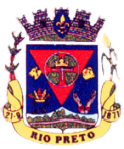
- Flag Coat of arms

- Location in Minas Gerais

- Location in Brazil
- Coordinates: 22°05′20″S 43°49′40″W
- Country: Brazil
- Region: Southeast
- State: Minas Gerais
- Mesoregion: Zona da Mata
- Microregion: Juiz de Fora
- Incorporated (municipality): September 21, 1871

Government
  - Mayor: Agostinho Ribeiro de Paiva

Area
  - Total: 348.14 km^{2} (134.42 sq mi)

Population (2020)
  - Total: 5,485
- Time zone: UTC−3 (BRT)
- CEP postal code: 36130-000
- Area code: 32
- HDI (2010): 0,679
- Website: Municipality website

Rio Preto is a municipality in the state of Minas Gerais in the Southeast region of Brazil.

== See also ==
- List of municipalities in Minas Gerais
