= Madre de Deus de Minas =

Town and municipality in the state of Minas Gerais, Brazil

Coordinates: 21°29′S 44°20′W

- Municipality
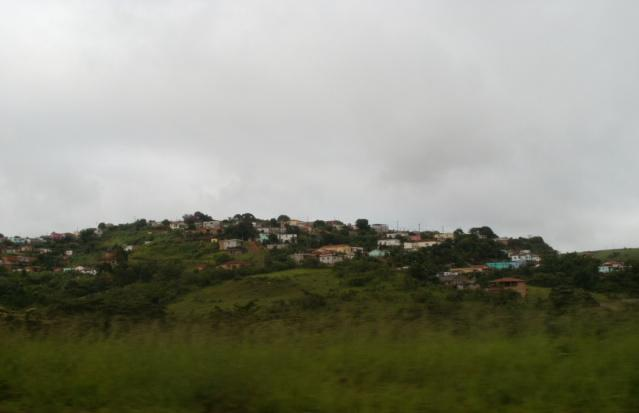

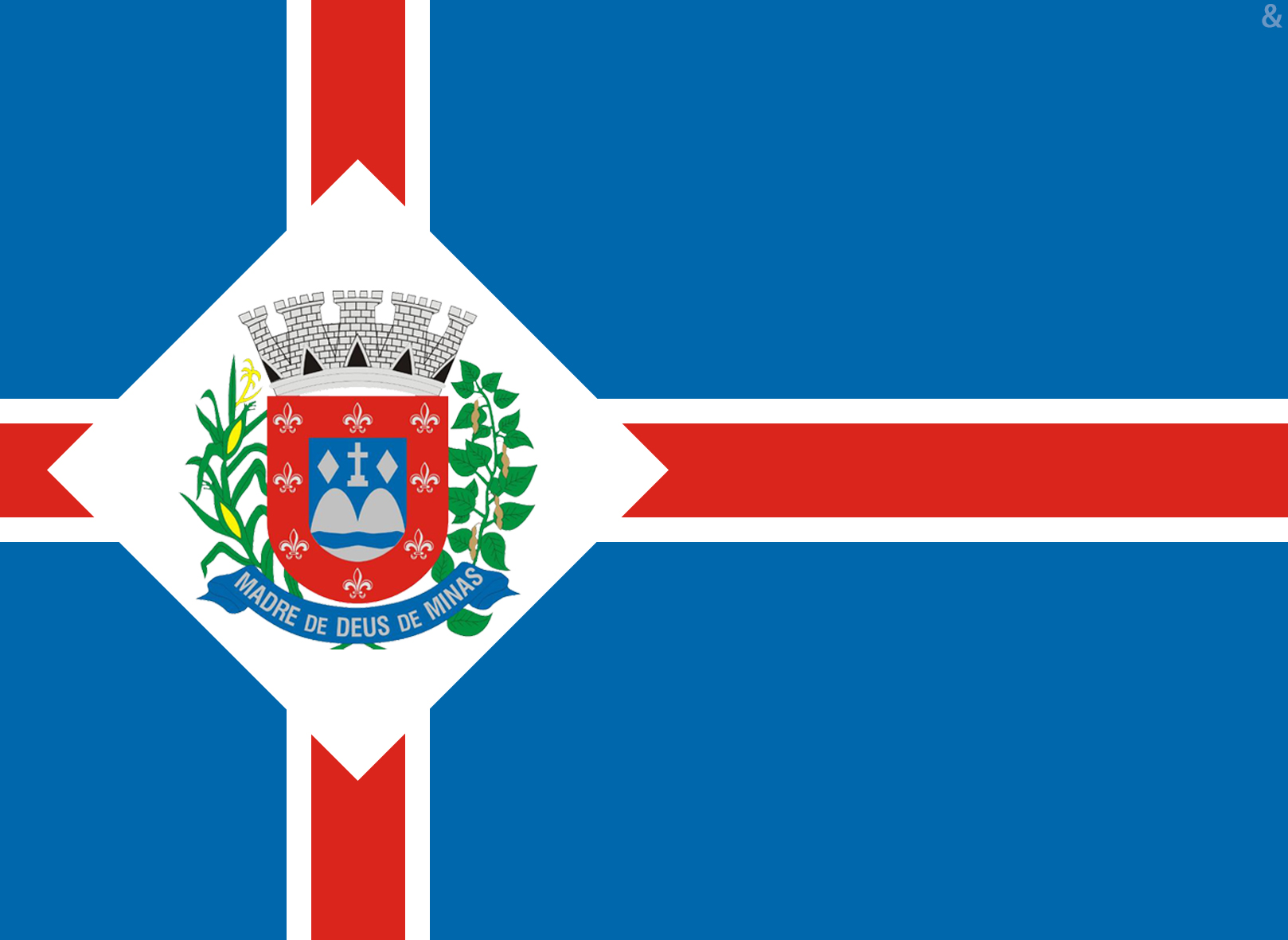
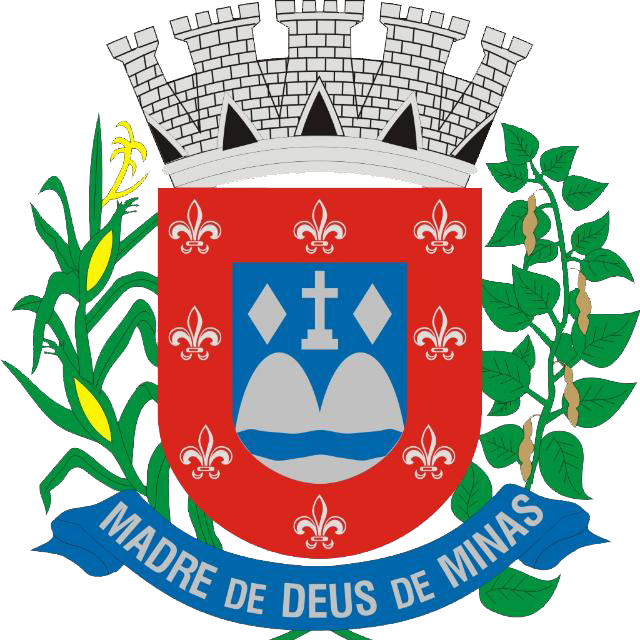
- Flag Coat of arms

- Country: Brazil
- Region: Southeast
- State: Minas Gerais
- Mesoregion: Campo das Vertentes
- Established: 12 December 1953

Area
  - Total: 492.909 km^{2} (190.313 sq mi)

Population (2022 Census)
  - Total: 5,191
  - Estimate (2025): 5,360
- Time zone: UTC−3 (BRT)

Madre de Deus de Minas is a Brazilian municipality located in the state of Minas Gerais. The city belongs to the mesoregion of Campo das Vertentes and to the microregion of Sao Joao del Rei. In 2025, the estimated population was 5,360.

== Geography ==
According to IBGE (2017), the municipality belongs to the Immediate Geographic Region of São João del-Rei, in the Intermediate Geographic Region of Barbacena.

=== Ecclesiastical circumscription ===
The municipality is part of the Roman Catholic Diocese of São João del-Rei.

== See also ==
- List of municipalities in Minas Gerais
