= Cruzília =

Coordinates: 21°50′S 44°48′W

Cruzília, Minas Gerais
- Municipality
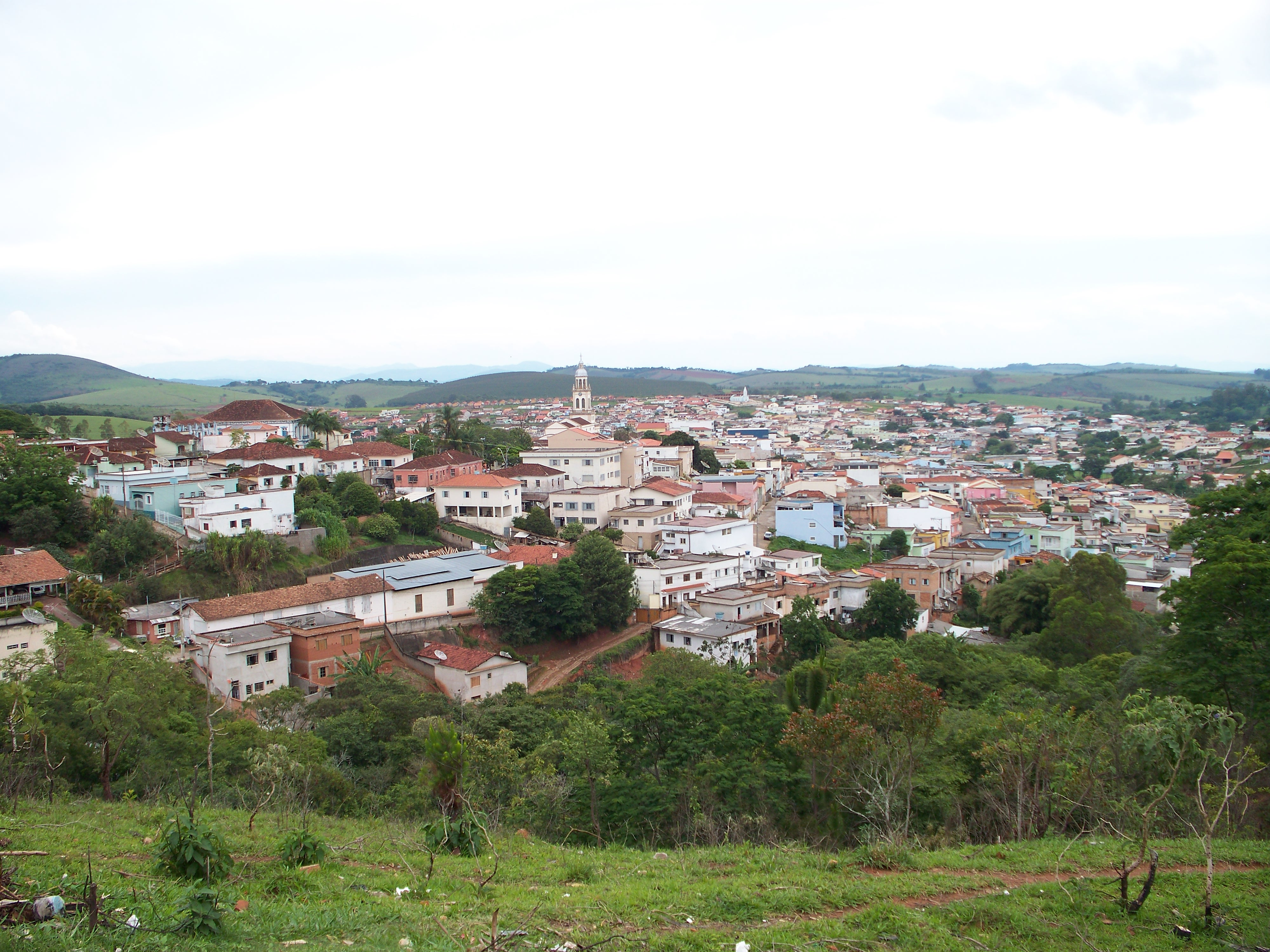
- Panoramic view of Cruzília

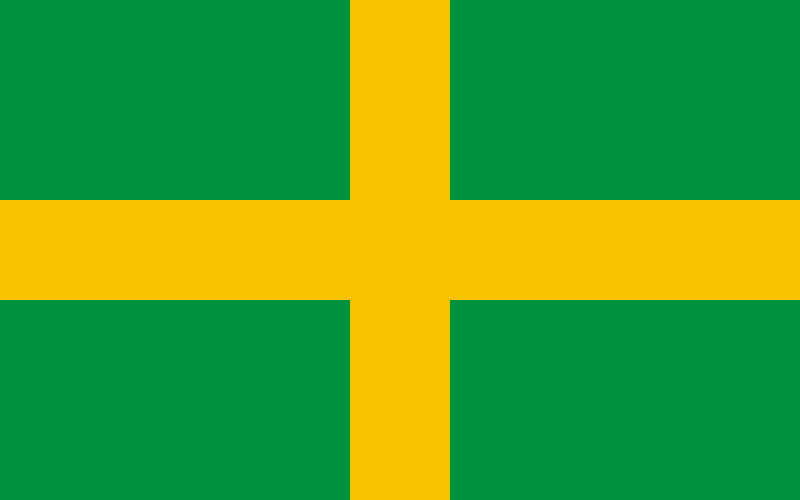
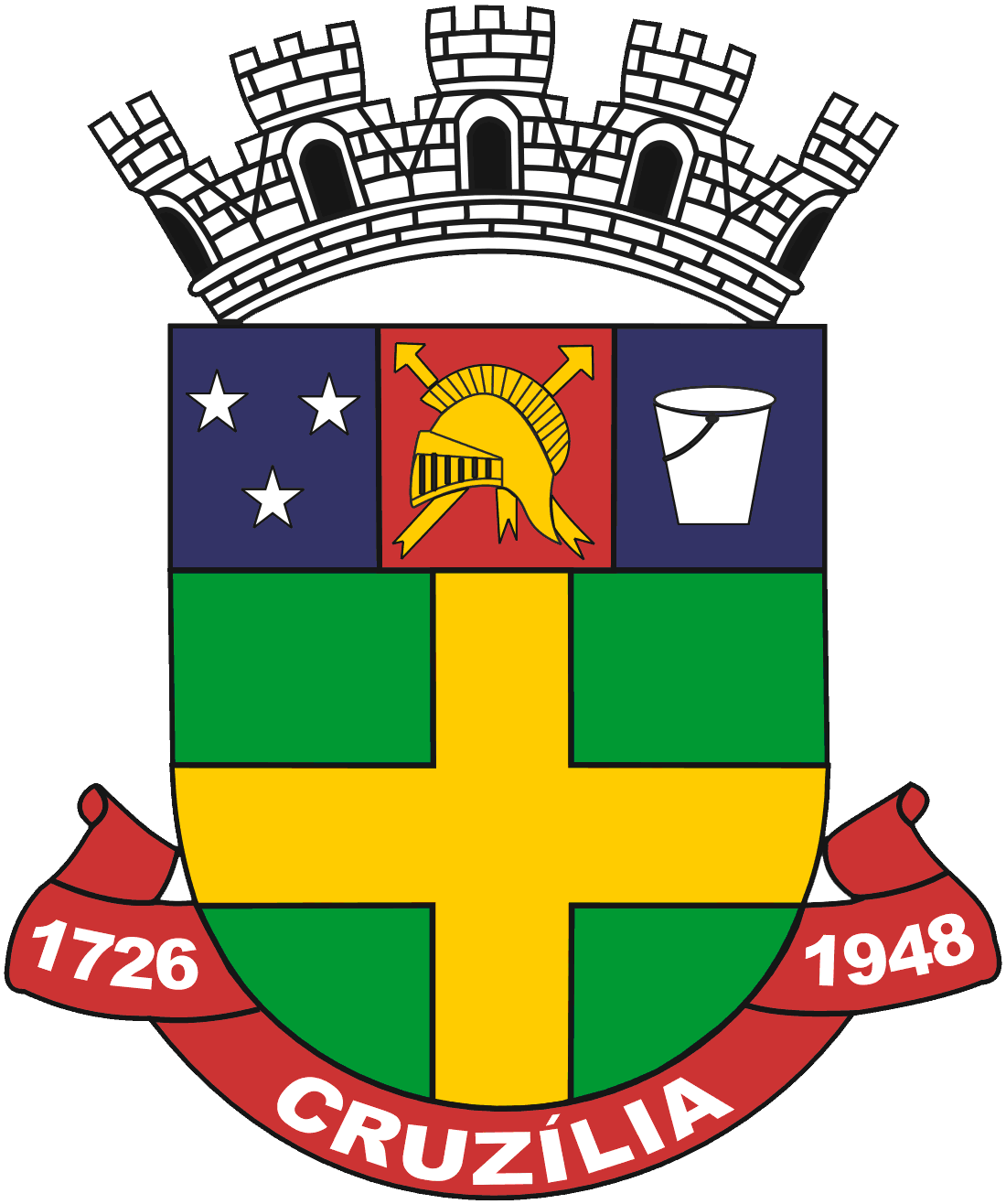
- Flag Coat of arms
- Interactive map of Cruzília, Minas Gerais
- Country: Brazil
- Region: Southeast
- State: Minas Gerais
- Mesoregion: Oeste de Minas

Population (2020)
  - Total: 15,474
- Time zone: UTC−3 (BRT)

Cruzília, Minas Gerais is a municipality in the state of Minas Gerais in the Southeast region of Brazil.

== See also ==
- List of municipalities in Minas Gerais
