= Carvalhos, Minas Gerais =

Coordinates: 22°00′03″S 44°27′39″W

- Municipality
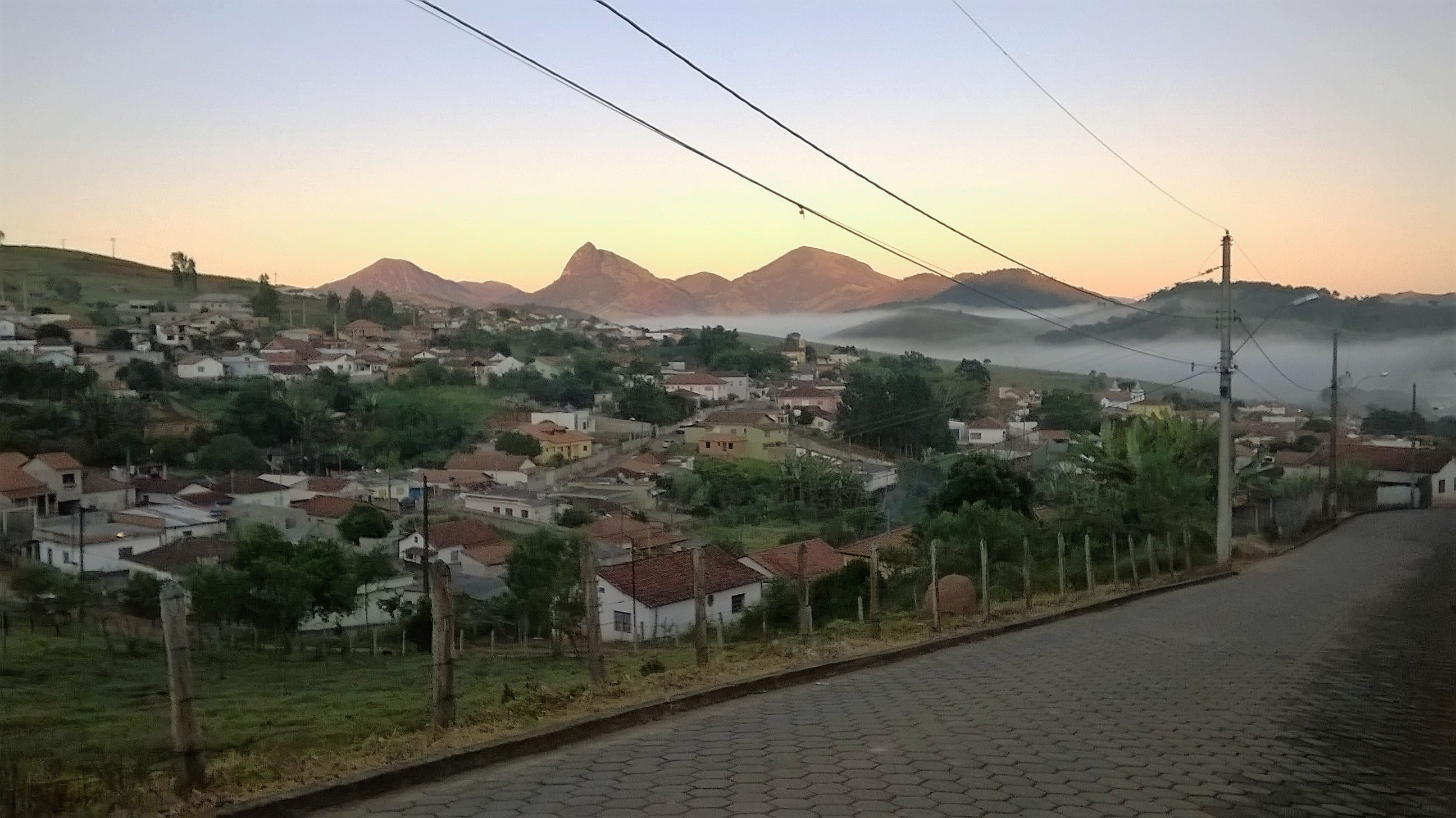
- Cidade de Carvalhos

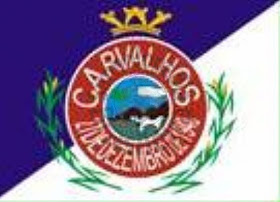
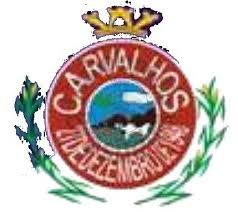
- Flag Coat of arms
- Interactive map of Carvalhos, Minas Gerais
- Country: Brazil
- Region: Southeast
- State: Minas Gerais
- Mesoregion: Oeste de Minas

Government
  - Mayor: Antonio da Padua (PTB)

Population (2020)
  - Total: 4,461
- Time zone: UTC−3 (BRT)

Carvalhos, Minas Gerais is a municipality in the state of Minas Gerais in the Southeast region of Brazil.

== See also ==
- List of municipalities in Minas Gerais
