= Immediate Geographic Region of Conselheiro Lafaiete =

Urban administrative region in Minas Gerais, Brazil

The Immediate Geographic Region of Conselheiro Lafaiete is one of the 10 immediate geographic regions in the Intermediate Geographic Region of Barbacena, one of the 70 immediate geographic regions in the Brazilian state of Minas Gerais and one of the 509 of Brazil, created by the National Institute of Geography and Statistics (IBGE) in 2017.

== Municipalities ==
It comprises 21 municipalities:

- Belo Vale
- Capela Nova
- Caranaíba
- Carandaí
- Casa Grande
- Catas Altas da Noruega
- Congonhas
- Conselheiro Lafaiete
- Cristiano Otoni
- Desterro de Entre Rios
- Entre Rios de Minas
- Itaverava
- Jeceaba
- Lamim
- Ouro Branco
- Piranga
- Queluzito
- Rio Espera
- Santana dos Montes
- São Brás do Suaçuí
- Senhora de Oliveira

== Statistics ==
Population: 347 490 (July 1, 2017 estimation).

Area: 5 490,826 km^{2}.

Population density: 63,3/km^{2}.
