= BR-040 (Brazil highway) =

Federal road of Brazil

BR-040

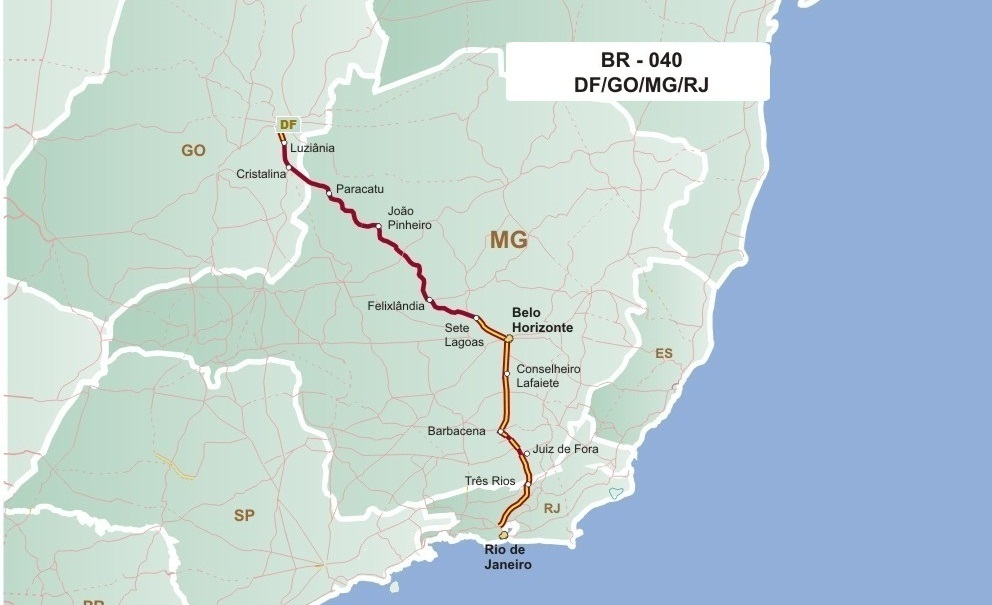

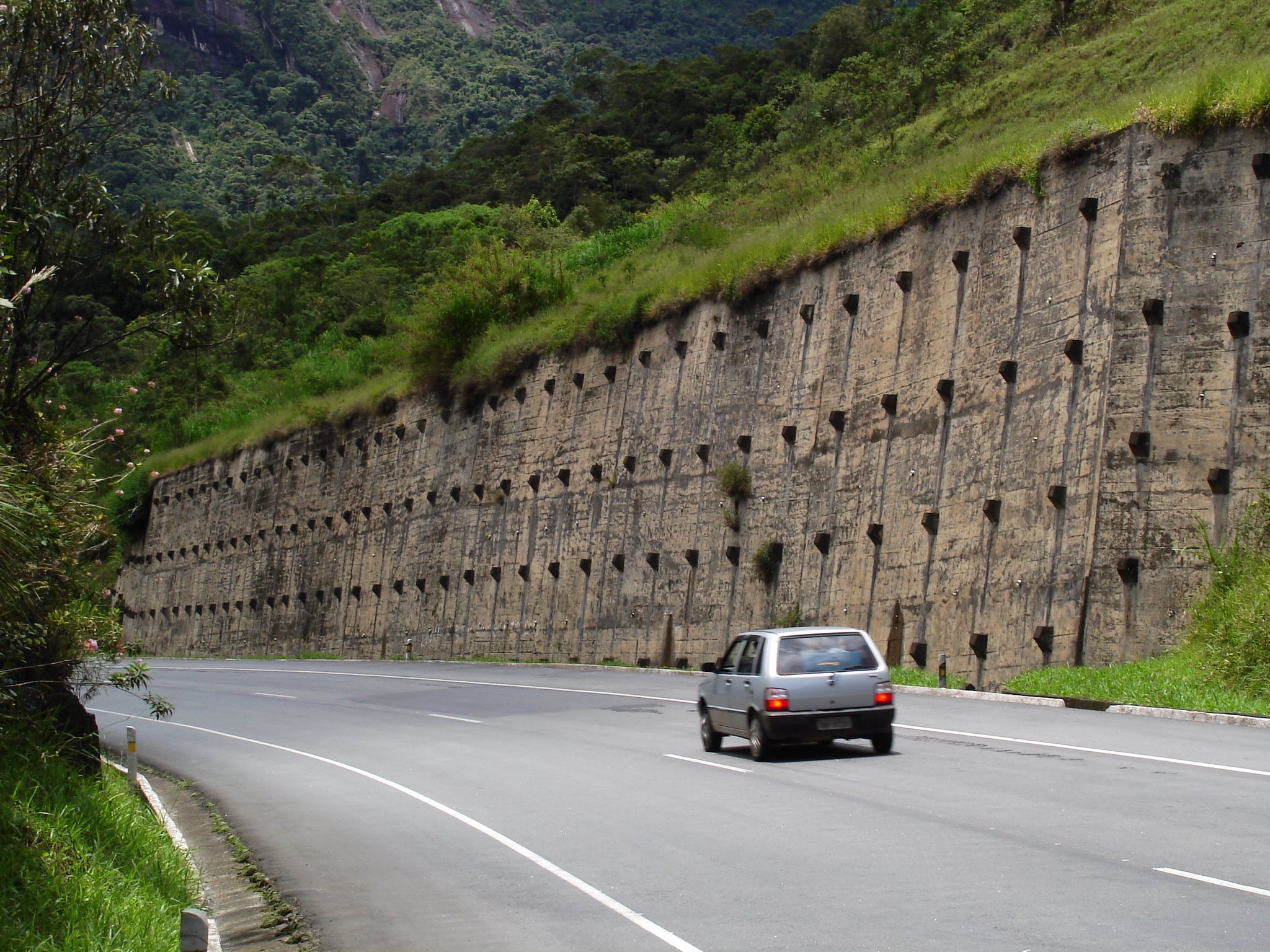
- BR-040 in Rio de Janeiro

Route information
- Length: 1,139.3 km (707.9 mi)

Major junctions
- North end: Brasília, Federal District
- South end: Rio de Janeiro, Rio de Janeiro

Location
- Country: Brazil

Highway system
- Highways in Brazil; Federal

BR-040 is a federal highway of Brazil. The 1,139.3 kilometres (707.9 mi) road connects Brasília to Rio de Janeiro.

== BR-040 Highway, Brazil ==
The starting point of the highway is in Brasília at the junction with the BR-450 (Via EPIA) and BR-251 (Via EPCT). The road ends at Praça Mauá at the Port of Rio de Janeiro. The BR-040 traverses Distrito Federal and the states of Goiás, Minas Gerais and Rio de Janeiro. It is the main road link between these parts of the country. In September 2009, the stretch of highway between Brasília (DF) and Petrópolis (RJ) was named President Juscelino Kubitschek Highway.

The BR-040 serves the following town and cities:

- Brasília (DF)
- Valparaíso de Goiás (GO)
- Luziânia (GO)
- Cristalina (GO)
- Paracatu (MG)
- João Pinheiro (MG)
- Três Marias (MG)
- Felixlândia (MG)
- Paraopeba (MG)
- Caetanópolis (MG)
- Sete Lagoas (MG)
- Ribeirão das Neves (MG)
- Contagem (MG)
- Belo Horizonte (MG)
- Congonhas (MG)
- Conselheiro Lafaiete (MG)
- Cristiano Otoni (MG)
- Carandaí (MG)
- Ressaquinha (MG)
- Alfredo Vasconcelos (MG)
- Barbacena (MG)
- Santos Dumont (MG)
- Ewbank da Câmara (MG)
- Juiz de Fora (MG)
- Matias Barbosa (MG)
- Simão Pereira (MG)
- Comendador Levy Gasparian (RJ)
- Três Rios (RJ)
- Areal (RJ)
- Petrópolis (RJ)
- Duque de Caxias (RJ)
- Rio de Janeiro (RJ)

Today's BR-040 came into being in 1973 under the National Transportation Plan. The initial draft saw the highway planned from Brasília to São João da Barra, (RJ). With the revision, the stretch between Belo Horizonte and São João da Barra became part of the BR-356 as part of the Rio stretch of the BR-040. This was originally part of the BR-135. Until 1964, the stretch between Rio de Janeiro and Belo Horizonte was called the BR-3.

Two stretches of the BR-040 are important to the history of Brazilian roads. The stretch between Petrópolis and Juiz de Fora included the Estrada União e Indústria, the first Brazilian highway, inaugurated on July 23, 1861 by Dom Pedro II. This stretch was replaced by the actual Rio de Janeiro-Juiz de Fora road in 1980. The stretch of the BR-040 situated between Petrópolis (RJ) and Rio de Janeiro (RJ) was named the Washington Luiz highway in honour of the ex-president of the republic who had it built during his 1926-1930 term. In 1931, the asphalt concrete road was the first of its kind in the country.

This stretch of the BR-040 between Juiz de Fora and Rio de Janeiro has been managed by the Companhia de Concessão Rodoviária Juiz de Fora-Rio de Janeiro (Concert) since 1996.

A significant urban stretch of the BR-040 in Rio de Janeiro is made up of the Avenida Brasil along with the BR-101 and Avenida Rodrigues Alves. After crossing the Rio Meriti and passing by Duque de Caxias, the highway ends at Praça Mauá.

=== History of the Washington Luiz highway ===
In 1926, President of the Republic Washington Luís declared to the nation that "governing means opening roads". By 1927, Brazil had 93,682 cars and 38,075 trucks. The Federal District and the State of Rio de Janeiro counted 13,252 cars and 5,452 trucks. One of the priorities was the Rio-Petrópolis highway, especially since the national press had heavily criticised the abandonment of the road to the Imperial City. Nevertheless, torrential rain poured down for two summers, washing away the sand and gravel required to surface the road. Impassable ruts formed on the tarmac. One newspaper commented on the delays, at a time when coupés, cabriolets and cockroaches all boarded the wagons of the Leopoldina.

The tools of the day were the pick, shovel, hoe and donkey cart. An outbreak of malaria occurred in the lowlands, while in the mountains of Petrópolis workers were forced to live in makeshift accommodation. President Washington Luís, alongside his ministers and regional authorities, inaugurated the Rio-Petrópolis highway on the 25th of August 1928. The road measured eight metres wide. The next day was a Sunday. No less than 1,783 cars took to the road, causing a reporter to compare the long, slow queues to those of Avenida Central. Just two days later, many road users admitted to being frightened by the sheer height of the trucks. Three years later, the 22 km (14 mi) mountain stretch was being surfaced. Three flyovers were built high above the rocky valley floor.

The former Rio-Petrópolis was long considered the finest highway in South America. In the 1950s the Petrópolis bypass was built, linking Itaipava to Xerém. This then became used as a route down from the mountains. Currently the old Washington Luiz serves as access road from the BR-040 to the arrival at Petrópolis (Quitandinha). Then, the Rio-Juiz de Fora meets the Rio-Teresópolis highway (BR-493 and BR-116).

=== The road from Petrópolis - Juiz de Fora ===
This stretch replaced the old Union and Industry road, the first Brazilian highway, which opened in 1861. Work began in 1975 and lasted 5 years, being completed on 15 June 1980. The finished road crosses mountainous, hilly and flat zones and is dual carriageway (14.40 m (47.2 ft) wide) throughout, although single carriageway was present from Matias Barbosa to the outskirts of Juiz de Fora until upgraded by Concert between 2005 and 2009 as far as km 773.

On the 138 km (86 mi) long journey from Petrópolis to Juiz de Fora, the BR-040 passes through seven municipalities. Traffic volume is around 7000 vehicles per day on this route with less from Rio-Bahia, according to the DNIT. On the 1st of March 1996, the stretch from Rio de Janeiro to Juiz de Fora was privatised and is under management for a period of 25 years by Concert. There are three tolls on the road, two in Rio de Janeiro at km 104 (Duque de Caxias) and km 45 (Areal) and one in Minas Gerais at km 814 (Simão Pereira)

=== From Juiz de Fora - Belo Horizonte ===
This stretch is 260 km (160 mi) long and corresponds approximately to the route of the Caminho Novo which opened in the Eighteenth Century. In the 1930s the road was straightened and extended to Belo Horizonte. On the 1st of February 1957 the BR-3 highway was officially opened by then president Juscelino Kubitschek. In 1982, the highway was widened from Belo Horizonte to the junction with the BR-356 for Ouro Preto, as was the stretch from Alfredo Vasconcelos to Serra da Mantiqueira near Santos Dumont. It was widened all the way to Juiz de Fora, except sections on bridges and overpasses. Since the mid-1990s further stretches have been widened.

Several danger spots are present on the highway such as the Curva do Ribeirão do Eixo (Km 588), Viaduto do Túnel (Km 756) among others. The most dangerous part of the road is the 90 km (56 mi) section between Conselheiro Lafaiete and the state capital.

In 1970, Toni Tornado won the Festival Internacional da Canção with soul song BR-3.

=== The Sete Lagoas stretch: BR-135 ===
Between the capital of Minas Gerais and Sete Lagoas the road is dual carriageway. From there on until Brasília the BR-040 is single carriageway. Over the years the northern part of Minas Gerais has developed and the increasing flow of vehicles, mostly trucks loaded with coal for steel works, has made the journey untenable. Long delays during festive periods were commonplace. Roadworks were planned to widen the BR-040 highway by the Federal Government in January 2007, beginning with the stretch between Sete Lagoas and the junction with the BR-135 at o Trevão de Curvelo. Altogether a 48 km stretch was widened, with two lanes on each side separated by flowerbeds. Only small sections of road remain under construction, with most of them already receiving traffic. Further bridges and viaducts have been scheduled for construction. In the case of Paraopeba, traffic now bypasses the city whereas before it passed through. According to the DNIT, this stretch has a daily flow of around 15,000 vehicles. It is of strategic importance for the region's raw material industries including coal.

== Gallery ==
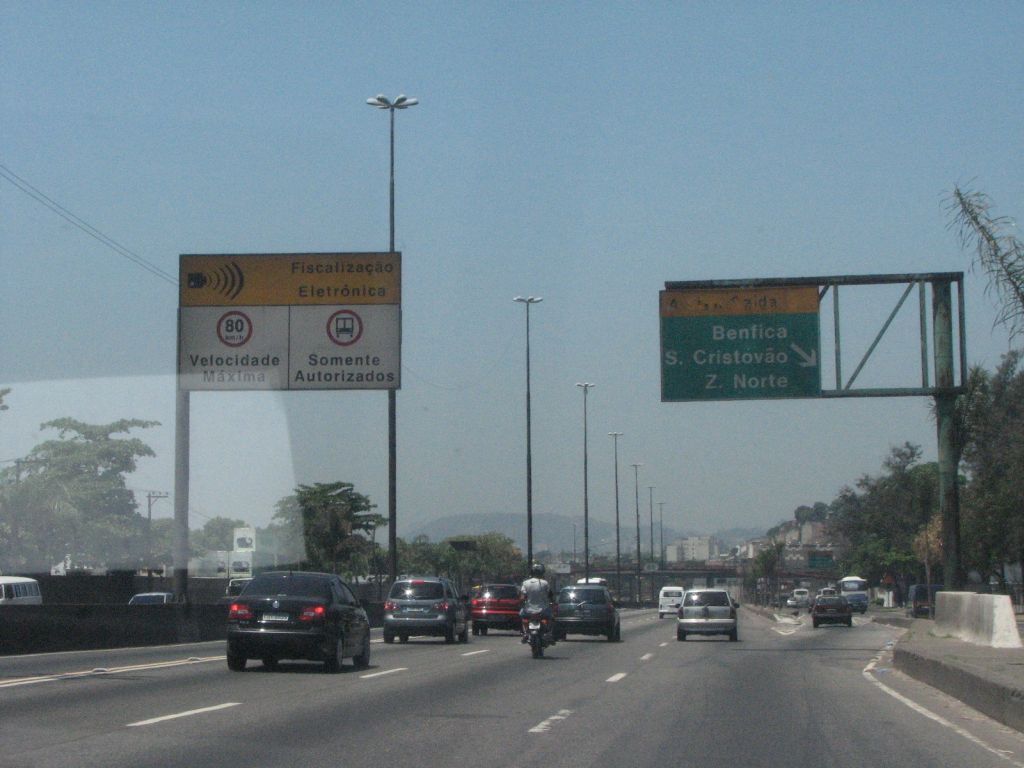
BR-040 on arrival in the city of Rio de Janeiro.

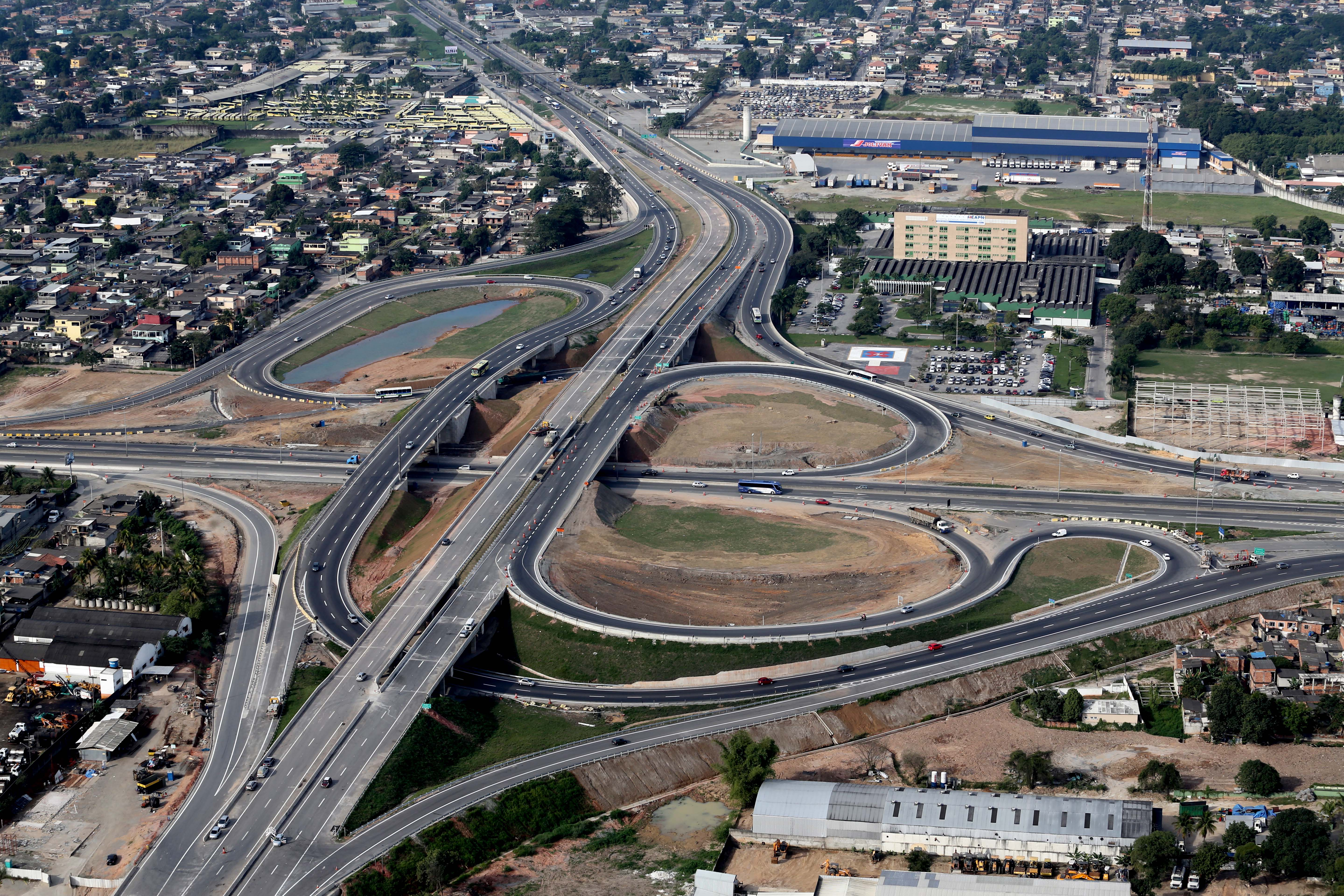
Arco Metropolitano do Rio de Janeiro interchange over BR-040.

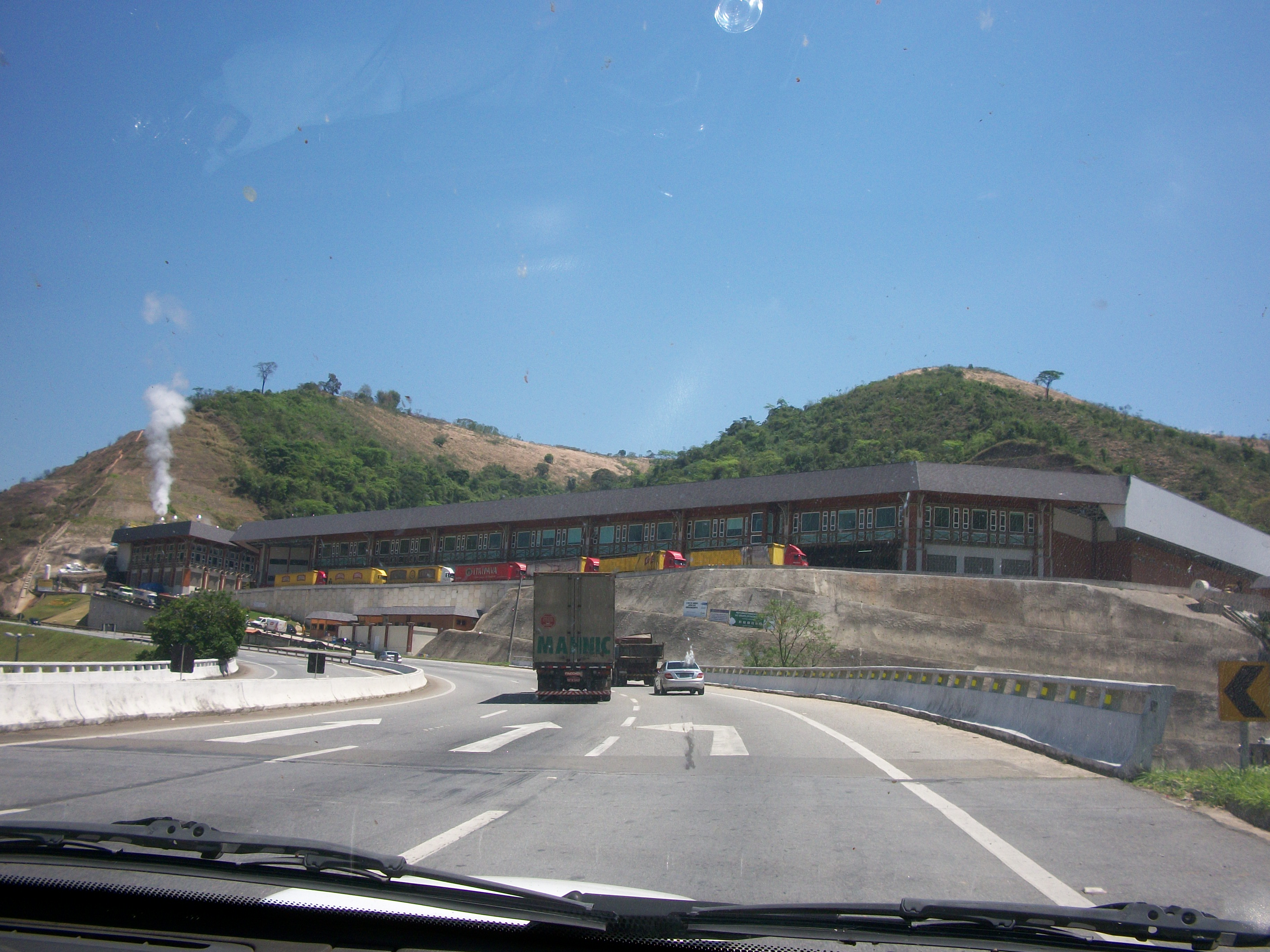
BR-040 in the Pedro do Rio district (in Petrópolis), next to the Grupo Petrópolis brewery.

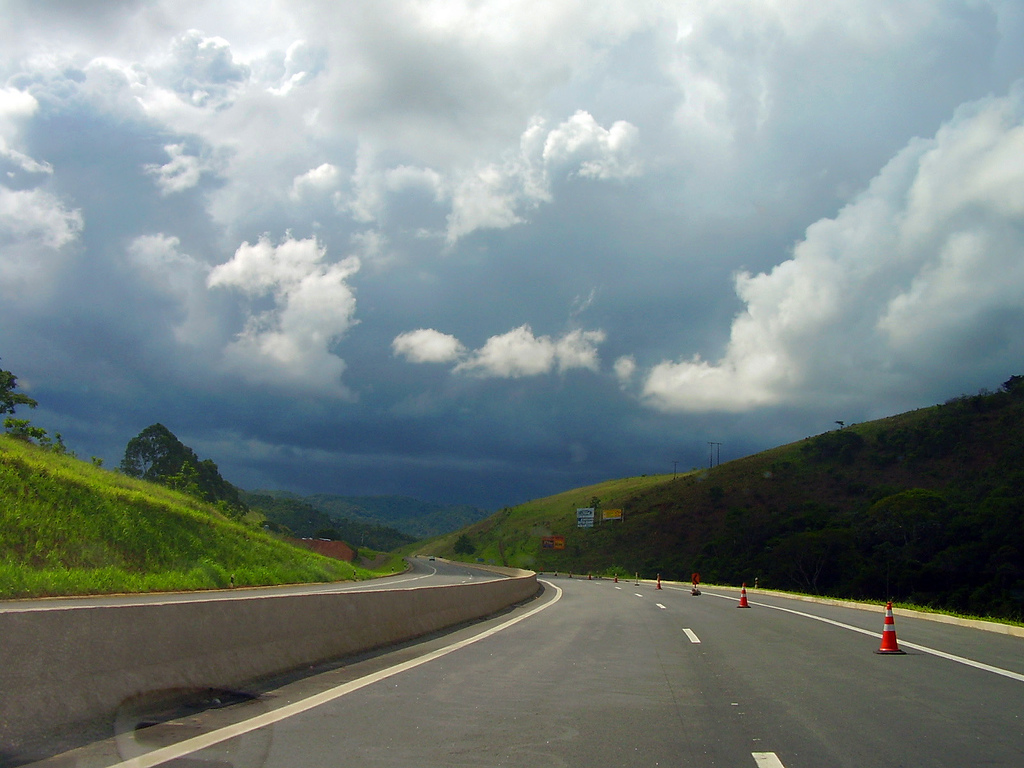
BR-040 near Juiz de Fora, Minas Gerais.

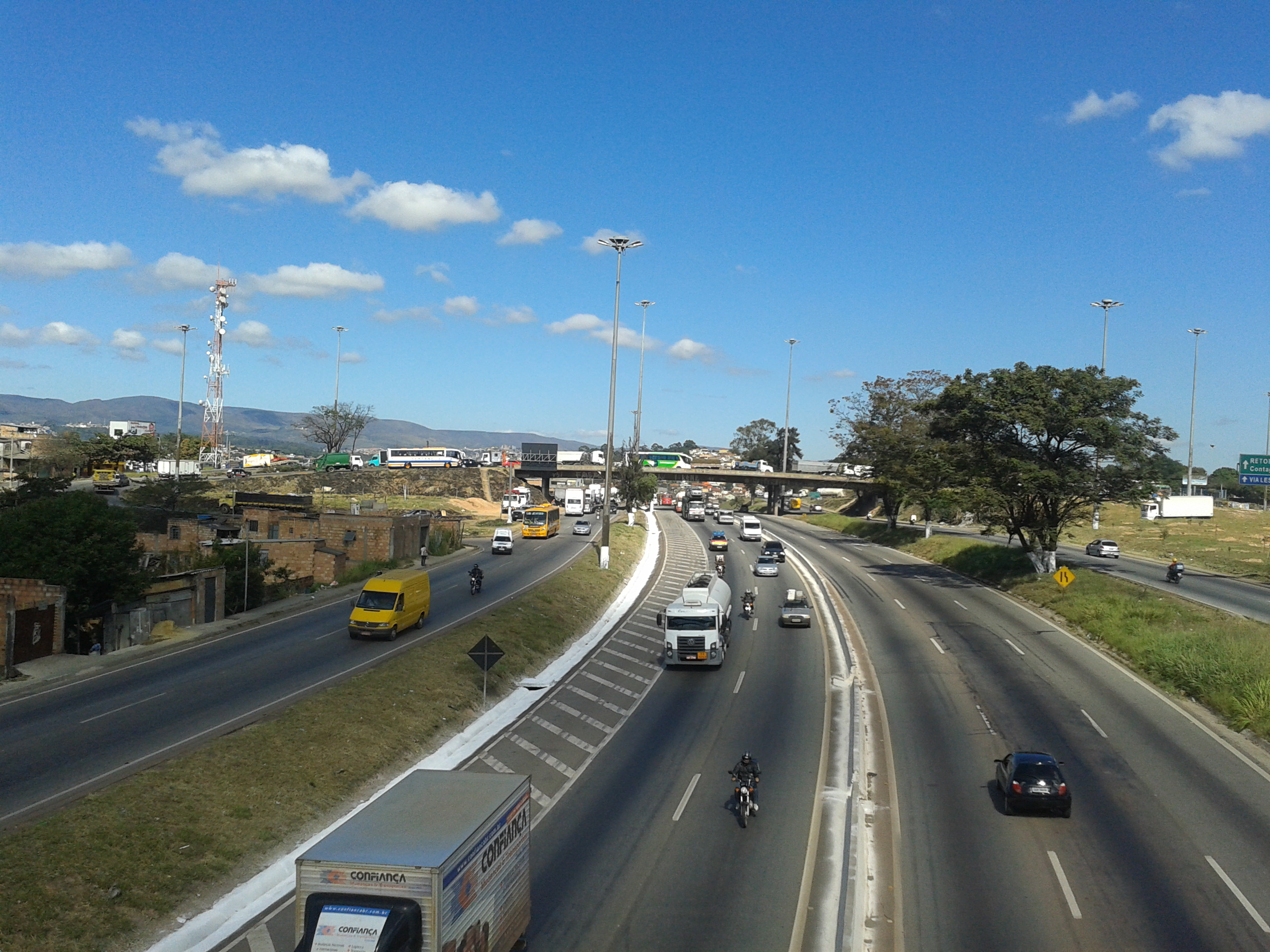
Celso Mello Azevedo Ring Road, in Greater Belo Horizonte, on its stretch towards Belo Horizonte-access to Rio de Janeiro

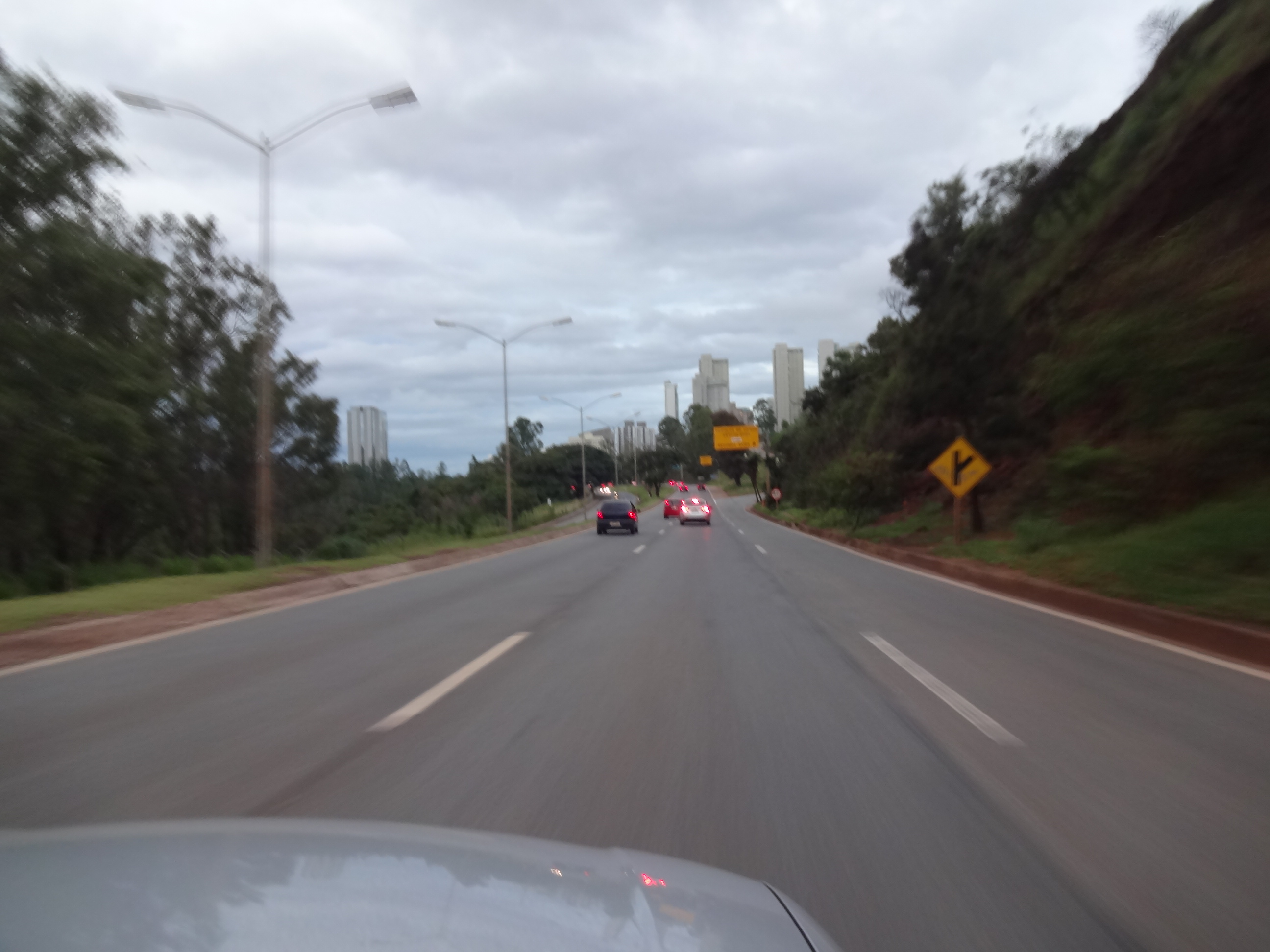
Car in the south of Nossa Senhora do Carmo (BR-040), in Belo Horizonte.

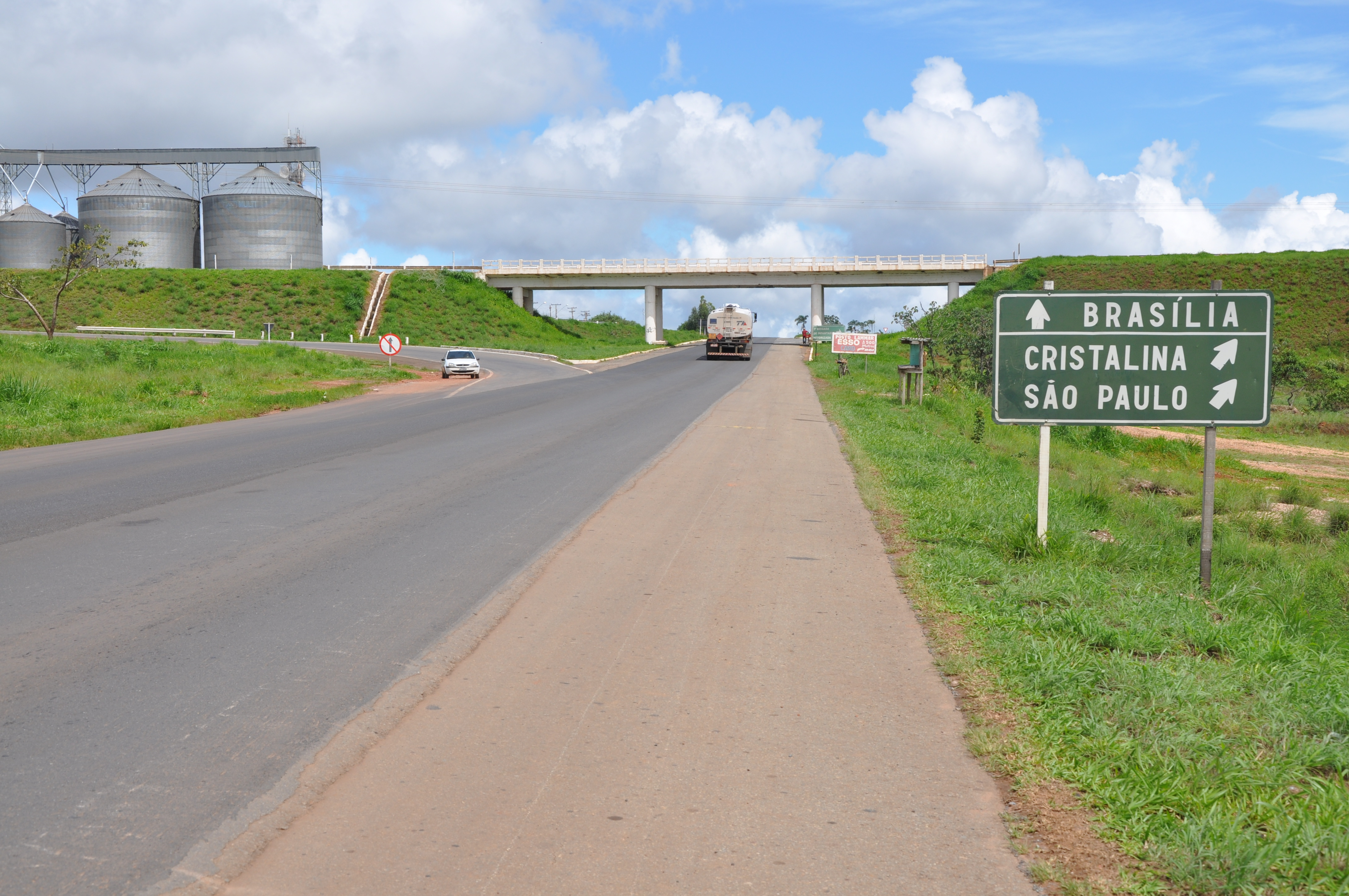
Section of BR-040 at the junction with BR-050 in Cristalina, Goiás.

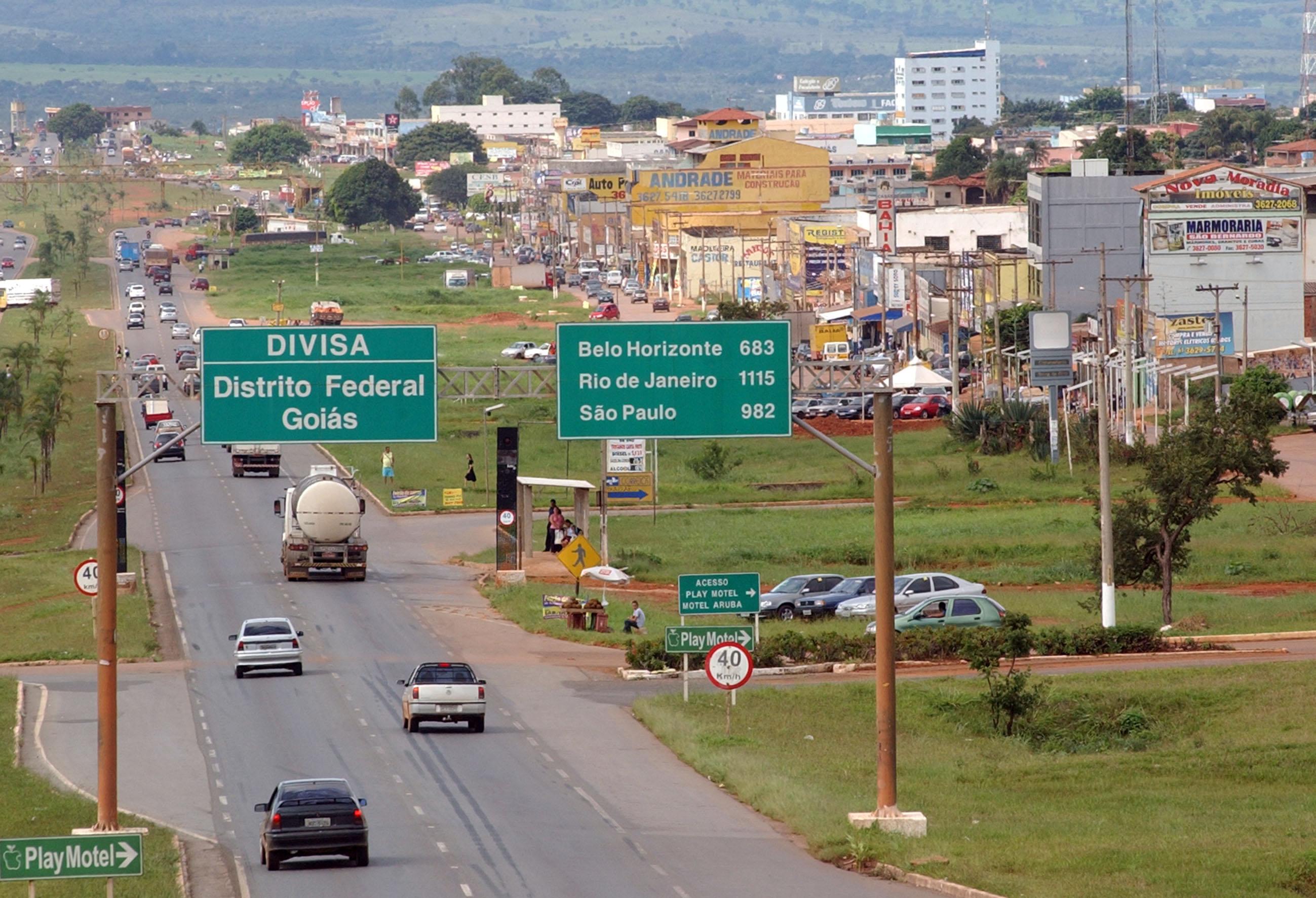
Concomitant stretch with BR-050, close to Valparaíso de Goiás, on the border between the Federal District and Goiás.

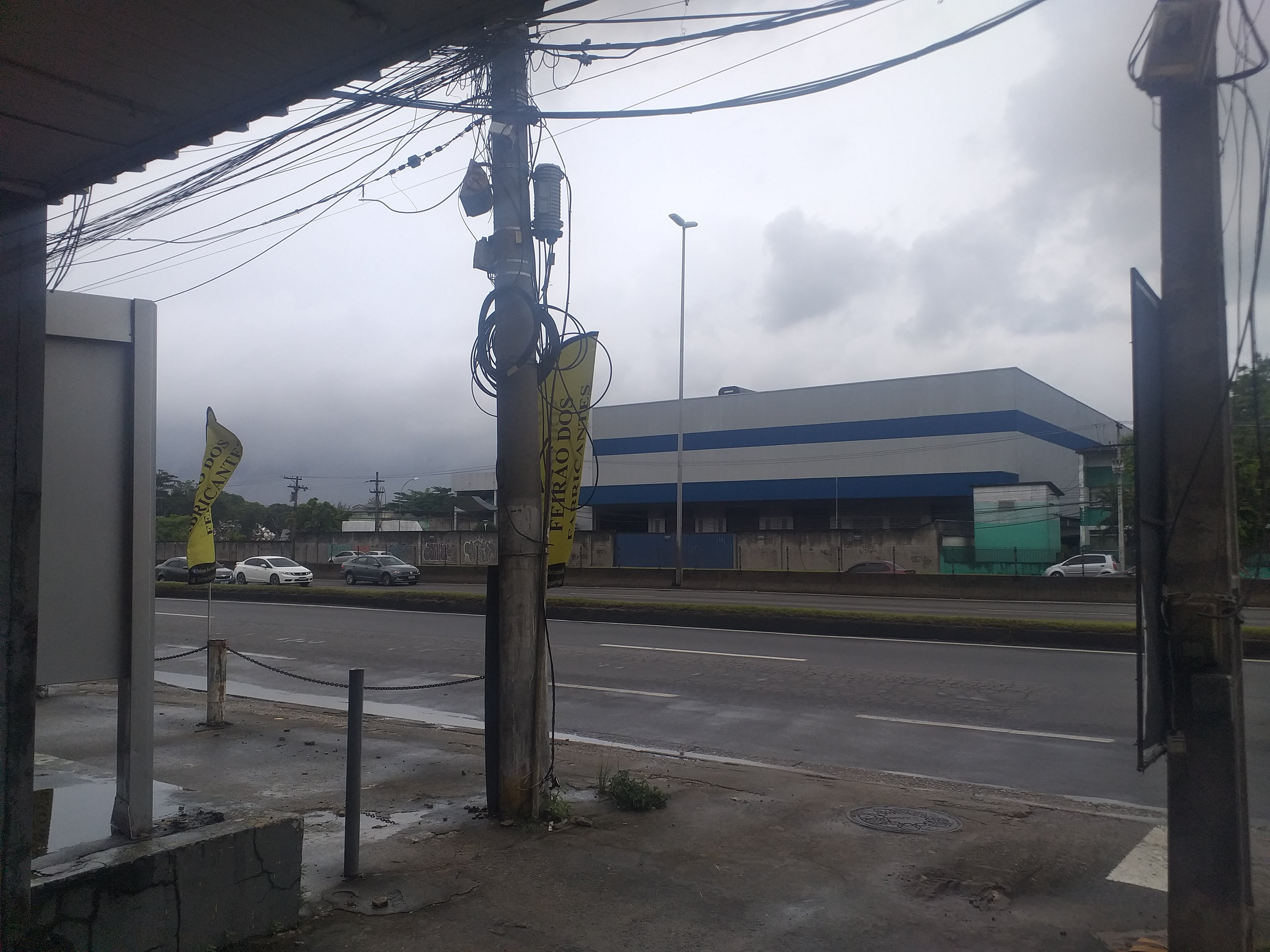
BR-040 in Duque de Caxias, Rio de Janeiro
