= Rio Espera =

Municipality in Minas Gerais, Brazil

- Municipality
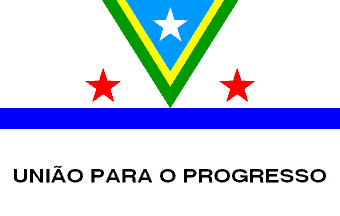
- Flag

- Location of Rio Espera in Minas Gerais
- Coordinates: 20.86°S 43.47°W
- Country: Brazil
- State: Minas Gerais
- Intermediate geographic region: Barbacena
- Immediate geographic region: Conselheiro Lafaiete
- Municipality created: 30 August 1911
- Municipal government installed: 1 June 1912
- Districts: Rio Espera, Piranguita, Rio Melo

Government
  - Mayor: Márcio de Miranda Assis (MDB)
  - Vice mayor: Sandro Pedro de Souza ("Sandro Titão") (Republicans)

Area
  - Total: 238.602 km^{2} (92.125 sq mi)

Population (2022 census)
  - Total: 5,429
  - Estimate (2025): 5,447
  - Density: 22.75/km^{2} (58.93/sq mi)
- Demonym: rio-esperense

HDI-M
  - 2010: 0.602
- Time zone: UTC-3 (BRT)
- Postal code (municipal seat): 36460-000
- Area code: 31
- IBGE code: 3155207
- Website: rioespera.mg.gov.br

Rio Espera is a municipality in Minas Gerais, Brazil, in the upper Doce River basin. It covers 238.602 km^{2} (92.125 sq mi) and had 5,429 inhabitants in the 2022 census. More than half lived in the countryside. Rio Espera is divided into the districts of Rio Espera, Piranguita, and Rio Melo. The rural communities of Moreiras and Buraco do Paiol are recognized as quilombola communities. The population has fallen steadily since 2000, when the municipality had 6,942 inhabitants, with most of the loss coming from rural areas.

Settlement began in the early 18th century, fruit of an expedition led by Manoel de Melo in 1710. A chapel dedicated to Our Lady of Piety grew into the center of the settlement, which became a parish in 1850. Rio Espera became a municipality in 1911. Its present boundaries took shape in 1962, when Rio Melo became a district and Lamim separated to become its own municipality.

Farming is common across the countryside, while public administration employs much of the registered workforce. Rio Espera has an unusually high concentration of cachaça producers. In 2024, 15 federally registered establishments gave it the second-highest number per inhabitant in Brazil. The local calendar has Congado and Folia de Reis celebrations, the feast of Nossa Senhora da Piedade, and festivals in the quilombola communities. Inside the parish church is a wooden Pietà attributed to Aleijadinho, although its authorship is disputed.

== History ==
=== Settlement and parish ===
Settlement in the area began in 1710, when Manoel de Melo led a group from Itaverava across the Piranga River. Near the present Praça da Piedade, Melo waited while members of the party explored the surrounding country. The episode gave rise to the name Rio Espera, from the Portuguese espera, meaning "waiting". Melo returned in 1711 with a larger group and established a farm. The settlers found small deposits of alluvial gold, but there was too little to sustain mining, and farming soon became their main occupation.

As the settlement grew, residents sought permission to build a chapel dedicated to Our Lady of Piety, Nossa Senhora da Piedade. The proposed location became a point of disagreement with Francisco de Souza Rego, a Portuguese landowner in the neighboring area that became Lamim. Rego wanted the chapel built on his own farm. The first episcopal authorization disappeared during the disagreement, and another was later issued.

The site near present-day Praça da Piedade was chosen on 20 October 1760. Manuel Ribeiro Taborda, vicar of Itaverava, blessed the chapel and churchyard on 4 March 1763, and Mass could be celebrated there from June 1765. By the following year, the chapel had a baptismal font and permanent permission to celebrate Mass and administer the sacraments. Mateus Pereira da Ponte and his wife, Quitéria de Oliveira, provided an endowment for the chapel in August 1766, which was approved in November 1768.

Espera became a parish on 1 June 1850, separate from São José do Chopotó, with São Caetano also becoming part of the new parish. The parish was established by the Diocese of Mariana on 2 July. Agostinho Resende da Ascensão became its first permanent parish priest in August 1853.

The name changed to Nossa Senhora da Piedade da Boa Esperança in 1866. The district passed from Piranga to Queluz in 1869, then returned to Piranga four years later. A road from Piranga to Espera was authorized in 1880. Piedade da Boa Esperança later passed to Alto Rio Doce, before returning once more to Piranga in 1901.

=== Municipal creation and the 20th century ===
Rio Espera became a municipality on 30 August 1911, when Piedade da Boa Esperança was separated from Piranga. The district and municipal seat took the name Rio Espera, and the first municipal government took office on 1 June 1912.

For its first decades, the municipality contained only the Rio Espera district. Lamim was added in 1938, when it was transferred from Conselheiro Lafaiete.

In 1950, the state took over the road joining Conselheiro Lafaiete, Piranga, and Rio Espera. Piranguita became a district in 1953, growing out of the settlement of Conceição da Piranguita. That same year, a federal concession allowed the municipality to use the hydraulic power of a waterfall on the Rio Melo. Rio Espera's judicial district opened in May 1955.

Rio Espera then had the districts of Rio Espera, Lamim, and Piranguita. In 1962, Lamim became a municipality of its own and Rio Melo became a district of Rio Espera. Lamim's municipal government took office on 1 March 1963. Rio Espera has since been divided into Rio Espera, Piranguita, and Rio Melo.

== Geography ==
Rio Espera covers 238.602 km^{2} (92.125 sq mi) and borders Alto Rio Doce, Capela Nova, Cipotânea, Lamim, Santana dos Montes, and Senhora de Oliveira. It forms part of the Immediate Geographic Region of Conselheiro Lafaiete and the Intermediate Geographic Region of Barbacena.

The municipality has three districts. The town of Rio Espera is the municipal seat, with Piranguita and Rio Melo farther out in the countryside. The land rises and falls considerably, from about 575 m (1,886 ft) near the mouth of Córrego Laurinha to 933 m (3,061 ft) at Alto dos Padilha.

=== Geology and relief ===
Most of Rio Espera rests on the Paleoproterozoic rocks of the Alto Maranhão Suite, which underlie about 73 percent of the municipality. The Mantiqueira Complex covers about 14 percent, while rocks of the Archean Rio das Velhas Supergroup account for most of the remainder. Tonalite and granodiorite are common across the center and west. Rocks of the Rio das Velhas Supergroup occur in smaller areas to the northwest and east.

Below ground, water is found mainly in fractures in the crystalline and metamorphic rock. These cracks allow groundwater to collect and move through rock that otherwise holds little water.

=== Hydrography ===
The Rio Espera runs through the municipal seat and gives the municipality its name. From there, it flows into the Xopotó River, which joins the Piranga river and forms part of the wider Doce River basin.

Streams across the center and east of Rio Espera feed the Rio Espera, while those farther west drain toward the Piranga. Ribeirão do Melo crosses the western countryside and passes through Rio Melo before reaching the Piranga. The Piranga also forms part of the boundary with Santana dos Montes.

The town grew along the Rio Espera, and many of its streets and roads follow the shape of the river valley.

=== Vegetation and conservation ===
Rio Espera is in the Atlantic Forest biome. The remaining native vegetation is mostly seasonal semideciduous forest, where part of the canopy loses its leaves during the drier months.

Native forest fragments covered about 19 percent of the municipality in 2014. They were concentrated northwest of the municipal seat and on steeper ground, especially near stream headwaters.

The municipality also has the Rio Espera Environmental Protection Area, or Área de Proteção Ambiental Rio Espera. Its ecological-economic zoning was established in 2021.

== Demographics ==
Rio Espera's population has been shrinking for more than two decades. It fell from 6,942 in 2000 to 6,078 in 2010 and 5,429 in the 2022 census. In 2022, there were 22.75 inhabitants per square kilometer.

More people still live in the countryside than in the urban area. In 2022, Rio Espera had 2,925 rural residents and 2,504 urban residents. Most of the population loss since 2010 came from the countryside. The rural population fell from 3,667 to 2,925, while the urban population rose slightly, from 2,411 to 2,504.

Rio Espera also has an aging population. The 2022 census counted 985 residents aged 65 or older. There were about 133 people in that age group for every 100 children aged 14 or younger. In Moreiras and Buraco do Paiol, younger residents often leave for education or work in Conselheiro Lafaiete and Belo Horizonte, leaving a larger share of older people in the two communities.

=== Quilombola communities ===
Moreiras and Buraco do Paiol are recognized rural quilombola communities. (Note: In Brazil, quilombola refers to members of communities whose histories are connected with quilombos, settlements formed principally by Afro-Brazilians during and after slavery. It is also a legal category used in recognizing these communities and their collective rights.) Moreiras received certification from the Palmares Cultural Foundation in 2007. Buraco do Paiol was certified in 2008, and a proceeding to regularize its land has been before INCRA since 2009. Moreiras was counted as a rural quilombola population cluster in the 2022 census.

Rio Espera had 292 quilombola residents in 2022, about 5.4 percent of the municipality's population and one-tenth of its rural population. Of the 241 quilombola residents aged 15 or older, 178 could read and write, or 73.86 percent. Across Rio Espera as a whole, the rate for people of the same age was 87.69 percent.

== Politics and government ==
Rio Espera has a mayor, a vice mayor, and a nine-member Municipal Chamber. The mayor and vice mayor run the municipal administration, while the chamber makes municipal laws and oversees the government. Each is elected for a four-year term. The chamber chooses its president and other officers for two-year terms. These arrangements are set out in the municipality's municipal charter, adopted in 1990.

Márcio de Miranda Assis of the Brazilian Democratic Movement was elected mayor in 2024 with 2,823 votes, or 57.22 percent of the valid vote. Juliano Motorista of the Liberal Party received 2,111 votes, or 42.78 percent. Miranda took office on 1 January 2025 with vice mayor Sandro Titão of Republicans. Ana Paula Pinto da Silva became president of the Municipal Chamber, with Marco Antônio de Miranda Cunha as vice president.

=== Mayors ===
Rio Espera's municipal gallery gives the succession of mayors from 1931 onward.

| Mayor | Term |
|---|---|
| Carlindo Garcêz | March 1931 – November 1933 |
| Theóphilo Rodrigues de Miranda | December 1933 – December 1945 |
| Alcindo Rego | January 1946 – December 1946 |
| João Batista Neto de Assis | January 1947 – October 1947 |
| Cícero Brandão | November 1947 – December 1947 |
| Carlindo Garcêz | January 1948 – December 1950 |
| José Colombo Rivelli | January 1951 – December 1954 |
| Carlindo Garcêz | January 1955 – December 1958 |
| Joaquim dos Santos Monteiro | January 1959 – December 1962 |
| Carlindo Garcêz | January 1963 – December 1966 |
| José Gordiano de São José | January 1967 – December 1970 |
| José Rodrigues de Miranda Sobrinho | January 1971 – December 1972 |
| Carlindo Garcêz | January 1973 – March 1975 |
| José Santiago da Mata | April 1975 – December 1976 |
| João de Assis | January 1977 – December 1982 |
| José Gordiano de São José | January 1983 – December 1988 |
| Júlio Moreira | January 1989 – December 1992 |
| Alberto Anjo de São José | January 1993 – December 1996 |
| Guadalupe Antônio Cardozo | January 1997 – December 2004 |
| Sérgio da Fonseca Dias | January 2005 – December 2005 |
| Luiz Balbino Moreira | January 2006 – December 2012 |
| Marcílio Oliveira Moreira Miranda | January 2013 – December 2016 |
| Lúcio Marcos da Silveira | January 2017 – May 2021 |
| Juliano Benício Henriques Gonçalves | May 2021 – December 2024 |
| Márcio de Miranda Assis | January 2025 – present |

== Economy ==
Farming is common across Rio Espera's countryside, where pasture, coffee, sugarcane, and small family farms form much of the rural economy. Public administration is the largest source of registered employment. In 2018, it accounted for 69.5 percent of the municipality's 334 formal jobs, followed by services at 14.7 percent and commerce at 11.4 percent. Agriculture and manufacturing together accounted for less than 5 percent. These figures cover formal employment, so they leave out much of the work done on family farms and by self-employed rural producers. GDP per capita was R$13,904.85 in 2023.

=== Agriculture and rural production ===
Rio Espera had an average planted area of 1,693 hectares in 2023 and 2024, while established pasture covered 6,340 hectares in the 2017 Agricultural Census. Coffee is grown in the municipality, and local growers take part in the regional coffee-quality competition organized through Emater-MG's Viçosa office.

In Moreiras and Buraco do Paiol, households use agroecological methods and sell part of what they grow through the federal Food Acquisition Program, PAA, and the National School Feeding Program, PNAE. Younger residents often leave for education or work elsewhere, leaving a greater share of the farming to older residents and other family members.

=== Cachaça production ===
Cachaça production is unusually concentrated in Rio Espera. The municipality is among the larger producers of sugarcane aguardente in southern Minas Gerais, alongside Alto Rio Doce and São João Nepomuceno.

Fifteen establishments in Rio Espera held valid federal registrations for cachaça production in 2024. That amounted to one establishment for every 365 residents, the second-highest concentration in Brazil after neighboring Lamim. Rio Espera had ranked first the previous year.

== Education ==
In the 2022 census, 99.35 percent of children aged 6 to 14 were attending school. Escola Estadual Major Miranda and Escola Estadual Monsenhor Francisco Miguel Fernandes are in the municipal seat.

=== Schools ===
Formal schooling in Rio Espera spread into the countryside during the early 20th century. Coeducational rural schools opened at Bicuíba and Córrego Fundo in 1928.

A ginásio, then the lower-secondary stage of Brazilian schooling, opened in Rio Espera in 1965. It received the name Ginásio Estadual Nossa Senhora do Rosário the following year. The school later became Escola Estadual Monsenhor Francisco Miguel Fernandes, receiving its present name in 1990.

Monsenhor Francisco Miguel Fernandes was enlarged and renovated in 2011. New classrooms, a computer laboratory, a reading room, and sports courts were added to the school.

=== Rural education ===
Children in Piranguita, Rio Melo, and Povoado do Inácio had local early-elementary classes attached to Escola Estadual Major Miranda in 2024, with two classes in each locality. School buses carry students from more distant rural communities to classes elsewhere in the municipality.

For students in the quilombola communities, distance remains part of the school day. Buraco do Paiol is about 6.5 km (4.0 mi) from the nearest schools offering the full elementary and secondary sequence, in the municipal seat. Children travel about 3 km (1.9 mi) before reaching the point where they board the school bus. Moreiras is about 2 km (1.2 mi) from a school in Ponte Alta that offers early-childhood education and the first years of elementary school. Older students continue to the municipal seat, about 8.7 km (5.4 mi) away.

== Health ==
Most public health care in Rio Espera is provided through Brazil's Sistema Único de Saúde (SUS). (Note: The Sistema Único de Saúde, usually called SUS, is Brazil's publicly funded national health system. Municipalities handle much of the routine care, while patients may travel elsewhere for treatment that is not available locally.)

=== Primary and hospital care ===
For routine care, the municipal seat has the José Gordiano de São José Family Health unit. The Otávio Pereira Barbosa health center serves residents outside the seat, while the Randolfo Moreira health post serves Rio Melo.

Hospital care is available at Hospital Municipal Maternidade São Francisco in the municipal seat. The hospital has 12 general clinical beds for SUS patients, as well as emergency, inpatient, and diagnostic services.

=== Emergency and regional care ===
Rio Espera has a basic-support ambulance of SAMU 192. (Note: A SAMU basic-support unit, or Unidade de Suporte Básico, is an ambulance equipped for pre-hospital emergency care.) The ambulance works within the Center-South SAMU system, which is operated by the regional health consortium CISRU.

Treatment that cannot be offered in Rio Espera may require travel to hospitals elsewhere in the region. Rio Espera is part of the Conselheiro Lafaiete health microregion, and the Santa Casa de Misericórdia de Barbacena receives patients from the municipality for hospital specialties not available locally.

== Transportation ==
Rio Espera's main paved road connection runs west along MG-132 through Lamim. Near Catas Altas da Noruega, the road meets MGC-482, which continues toward Conselheiro Lafaiete.

MG-275 also reaches the municipality. The section between Rio Espera and MG-132 has carried the name Guadalupe Antônio Cardozo Highway since 2010.

East of Rio Espera, MG-132 continues toward Cipotânea. Paving this stretch has been planned for years. An engineering project was commissioned in 2013, and a 2022 tender called for a new design covering about 16 km (9.9 mi), including planned paving and bridge work. The 2022 contract concerned the engineering design, not construction of the road itself.

=== Public transportation ===
Buses run from Rio Espera and Rio Melo to Conselheiro Lafaiete. Piranguita has a separate connection through Santana dos Montes.

For people living in the countryside, some journeys are tied directly to school and medical care. School buses bring rural students to classes elsewhere in the municipality, while patients travel outside Rio Espera for treatments such as oncology and hemodialysis.

== Public services and communications ==
=== Water and sanitation ===
The Companhia de Saneamento de Minas Gerais (Copasa) supplies treated water in the town of Rio Espera. Water from the Córrego Conceição system passes through the Rio Espera treatment plant before entering the distribution network.

Away from the municipal seat, wells and cisterns are more common. In 2022, 49.1 percent of residents in occupied permanent private households received water from a general distribution network. Deep or artesian wells supplied 20.9 percent, and shallow wells or cisterns supplied 14.1 percent. Copasa's service area covered the municipal seat rather than the whole municipality in 2024.

Sewer service is more limited. Rio Espera and Rio Melo had municipal sewer systems by 2014. In the municipal seat, the network had a pumping station and treatment plant, but the plant was not operating because the interceptor needed to carry sewage to the pumping station had not been completed. In 2015, collected sewage in the municipal seat was still going untreated, and expansion of the collection and treatment system was planned through 2035.

Sanitation still varies considerably from one household to another. In 2022, 21.8 percent of residents lived in homes using the census category that combines a general sewer or stormwater network with septic systems connected to a network. Rudimentary pits or holes were used by 20.1 percent, while 4.4 percent used a septic tank or filter that was not connected to a network.

=== Solid waste ===
Household waste collected in Rio Espera is taken to a sorting and composting unit at Rolador. (Note: A Unidade de Triagem e Compostagem separates recyclable material from municipal waste and composts part of the organic material. What cannot be recovered is sent elsewhere for disposal.) The unit opened in 2010. By 2020 it was licensed to process about two metric tons of waste each day, with a transfer area for about 0.6 metric tons of material that could not be recovered. Recyclables are separated for sale, part of the organic waste is composted, and the rest is sent to the Ecotres sanitary landfill in Conselheiro Lafaiete.

Collection does not reach every household. In 2022, 75.1 percent of residents in occupied permanent private households had their waste collected. Nearly one-quarter, 24.3 percent, burned household waste on their property, while 0.4 percent buried it.

=== Electricity ===
Cemig supplies electricity in Rio Espera. Work to extend the 13.8 kV rural distribution network was authorized in 2024, and the boundaries needed for the new lines were adjusted in January 2026.

=== Communications ===
Rio Espera FM broadcasts on 98.7 MHz as a community radio station. Its operator, the Associação Comunitária de Radiodifusão de Rio Espera, ACORARE, received federal authorization for community broadcasting in 2009.

The monthly Rio Espera em Foco, produced by Simone Santiago, published local news online from at least 2014 to 2018.

== Public safety ==
=== Police and fire services ===
The Military Police of Minas Gerais State has a detachment in Rio Espera, attached to the 31st Military Police Battalion in Conselheiro Lafaiete.

Civil Police cases are handled from Ouro Branco. Firefighting and rescue crews serving Rio Espera come from the[Military Firefighters Corps of Minas Gerais unit in Conselheiro Lafaiete.

=== Civil defense ===
Rio Espera has a municipal Civil Defense department for floods, landslides, and other emergencies.

Heavy rain on 9 January 2025 sent rivers over their banks in the municipal seat. On Rua Dr. Carmindo Garcez, the water reached about 1.5 m (4.9 ft). Part of a damaged bridge at Vargem dos Gonçalves had to be closed, and a landslide blocked another road. No deaths or injuries were reported, and no residents were left homeless or displaced. Civil Defense worked with the Military Police and firefighters during the response.

== Parks and recreation ==

Praça da Piedade is the main public square in the municipal seat. It is used for walking and exercise as well as Christmas displays, religious festivities, and other public gatherings.

Cachoeira das Araras is used for swimming, and on the Monday of Carnival a community inner-tube descent follows the river toward Piranguita. Cachoeira da Ponte Alta, in the countryside, flows through a rocky channel where natural pools are used for bathing.

The Hilário Campos Municipal Stadium is a football ground in the municipal seat. Floodlights installed in 2016 allowed matches and training to continue after dark. By 2020, Rio Espera also had an outdoor exercise area and a municipal youth football program.

== Culture ==
=== Cultural institutions ===
The Casarão da Piedade stands on Praça da Piedade. The building once housed the municipal jail, registry office, and courthouse before passing into municipal ownership and being adapted for public use. It is protected by the municipality and reopened after restoration in 2021 as the municipal museum and the Messias Brandão Sol Public Library.

In 2024, residents of Buraco do Paiol and Moreiras took part in public meetings to decide how Rio Espera would spend federal funding from the National Aldir Blanc Policy for the Promotion of Culture. The resulting plan directed money toward cultural spaces in the two quilombola communities.

=== Music and folk traditions ===
The Corporação Musical Santa Cecília is Rio Espera's municipal band. It performs at municipal and religious celebrations, including the annual feast of Nossa Senhora da Piedade.

The Guarda de Congado Nossa Senhora do Rosário is based in the municipal seat and takes part in Congado gatherings in Rio Espera and neighboring municipalities. (Note: Congado is an Afro-Brazilian Catholic celebration with music, dance, processions, and ceremonial groups devoted to Catholic saints. In Minas Gerais, the participating groups are commonly called guardas or ternos.)

Folia de Reis is also practiced in Rio Espera. (Note: A Folia de Reis is a group of musicians and singers who travel between homes around Christmas and Epiphany in remembrance of the visit of the Magi to the infant Jesus. The group carries a decorated banner and is usually welcomed by families along its route.) The Folias de Minas received state intangible-heritage registration in 2017. Rio Espera's Estrela do Oriente group is devoted to the Magi and the infant Jesus. Its musicians travel from 1 to 6 January with viola, guitar, cavaquinho, accordion, percussion, and other instruments.

Moreiras holds an annual feast of Saint Iphigenia with Mass, a procession, a ceremonial reinado, and Congado. The community held its first Black Consciousness celebration in 2019, bringing Congado together with capoeira, music, poetry, theater, crafts, and local food. Gastronomic festivals and the Saint Iphigenia celebration remained active in the community in 2025, with younger residents helping to organize and publicize them. Straw handicrafts are made in Buraco do Paiol.

=== Religious festivals ===
The parish of Nossa Senhora da Piedade, established in 1850, holds its patronal feast on the last Sunday of September. A novena precedes the feast, and people from rural communities travel to the municipal seat for the closing Mass and procession with the image of Nossa Senhora da Piedade.

Rio Melo has a church dedicated to Nossa Senhora dos Milagres. A local story connects its wooden image of the Virgin with a muleteer who called on her after losing control of his horse.

=== Sacred art ===
The matrix church of Nossa Senhora da Piedade contains a wooden Pietà of Mary holding the dead Christ. The Archdiocese of Mariana and Minas Gerais tourism authorities attribute the sculpture to Antônio Francisco Lisboa, Aleijadinho.

Another sculpture once kept in Rio Espera, the Cristo da Paciência or Nosso Senhor da Paciência, has also been attributed to Aleijadinho. After it entered private collections, the parish and local residents sought its return. A court-ordered examination took place at the Minas Gerais office of IPHAN in 2017. By 2025, the sculpture remained outside Rio Espera after passing through private collections in Belo Horizonte and São Paulo.

=== Festivals ===
The Festa do Rioesperense accompanies the municipality's anniversary celebrations at the end of July. Concerts and local performances form part of the program, which has also included the Quadrilha dos Marmanjos, a dairy-cattle competition, and a horse exhibition.

== Notable people ==
- José Brandão de Castro (1919–1999), Redemptorist bishop. Born in Rio Espera, he was the first bishop of the Diocese of Propriá, serving from 1960 to 1987, and attended all four sessions of the Second Vatican Council.
- Jacyntho Lins Brandão (born 1952), classicist, translator, poet, and professor. Born in Rio Espera, he taught Greek language and literature at the Federal University of Minas Gerais from 1977 to 2018 and was vice rector from 1994 to 1998. His Portuguese translation of the Epic of Gilgamesh, made directly from Akkadian, was a finalist for the Prêmio Jabuti in 2018. His poetry collection Harsíese later received the National Library Literary Prize.
- José Francisco da Silva Concesso (1936–2020), writer, teacher, and Latinist. Born in Rio Espera, he moved to Araguaína in 1966 and became the first director of the Faculdade de Educação, Ciências e Letras de Araguaína, which later became part of the university system in Tocantins. He founded the Academia de Letras de Araguaína e Norte Tocantinense and belonged to the Academia Tocantinense de Letras. Tocantins granted him honorary state citizenship in 2017.
- Alcindo Rego (1916–2011), politician, newspaper director, and businessman. Born in Taiobeiras, he served as mayor of Rio Espera in 1946. He later lived in São Gotardo, where he directed the newspaper Correio do Oeste in 1953 and presided on the Municipal Chamber. He later worked in business.
- Ricardo Miranda, journalist. Born in Rio Espera, he worked for the Tribuna de Minas in Juiz de Fora. With Daniela Arbex and Táscia Souza, he received the IPYS Award for investigative reporting on corruption in Latin America and the Caribbean for their work on the Caso Koji investigation.
- José Belvino do Nascimento (1932–2019), bishop of Itumbiara and later bishop of Divinópolis. Born in Mercês, he moved to Rio Espera with his family at about one year of age and spent his childhood there before entering the seminary in Mariana.

== See also ==
- List of municipalities in Minas Gerais
