= Caranaíba =

Human settlement in Brazil

Coordinates: 20°53′S 43°44′W

- Municipality
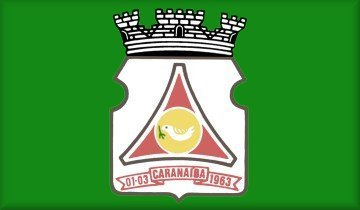
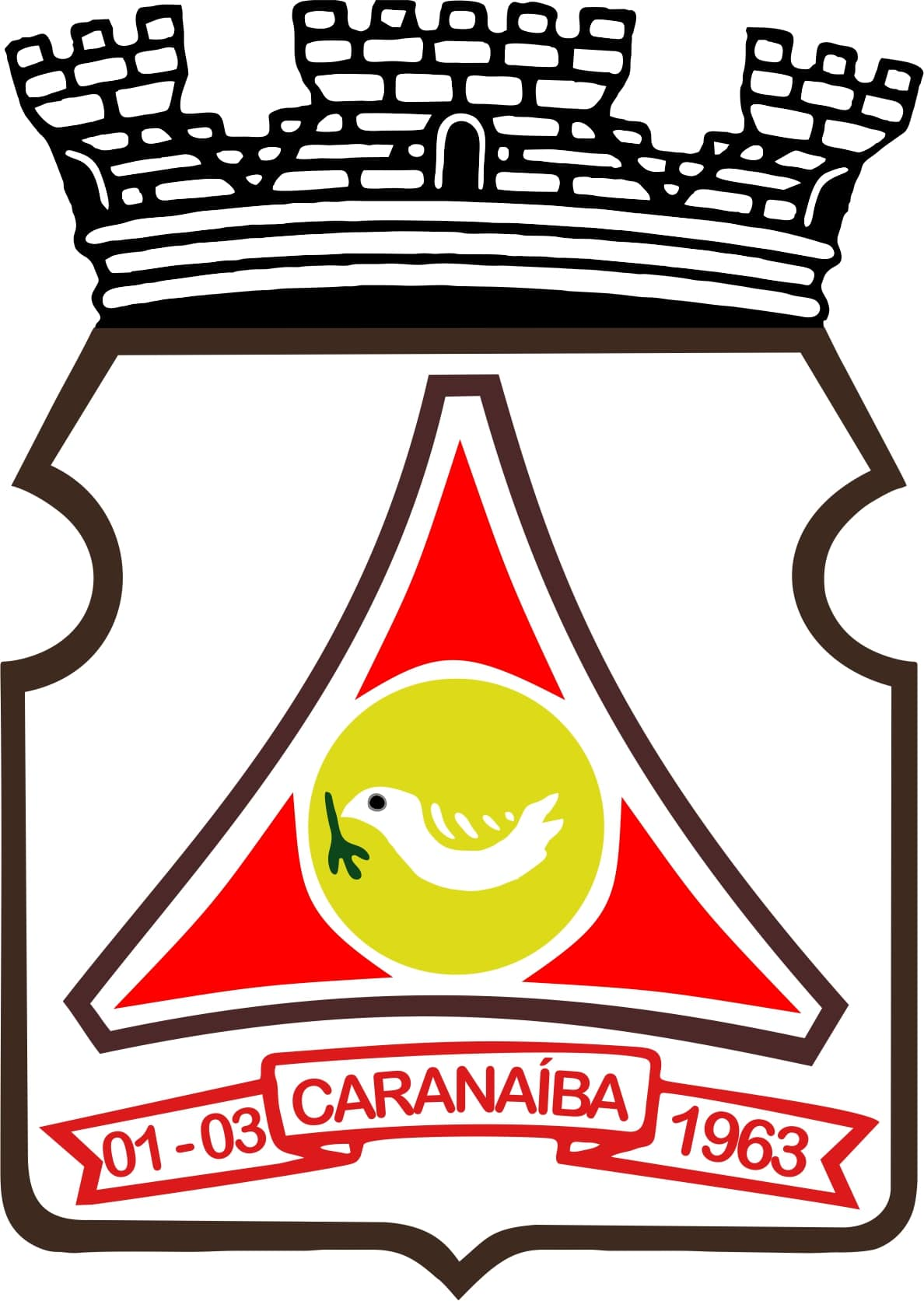
- Flag Coat of arms
- Interactive map of Caranaíba
- Country: Brazil
- State: Minas Gerais
- Region: Southeast

Population (2022 Census)
  - Total: 2,933
  - Estimate (2025): 2,942
- Time zone: UTC−3 (BRT)

Location of Caranaíba within Minas Gerais

Caranaíba is a Brazilian municipality located in the state of Minas Gerais. Its population as of 2020 was 3,166 people living in an area of 160 km^{2} (62 sq mi). The elevation varies between 700 meters and 1,231 meters. The city belongs to the mesoregion of Campo das Vertentes and to the microregion of Barbacena. The municipal seat lies at an elevation of 822 meters in a valley in the Serra do Espinhaço.

Municipal limits are with Carandaí, Capela Nova, Rio Espera, Cristiano Otoni and Santana dos Montes-

Caranaíba is 14 km. east of the important BR-040 highway, to which it is connected by a paved inter-municipal road. There are dirt roads connecting with the neighboring municipalities of Capela Nova and Santana dos Montes. It is in an area of rolling hills, many of which are still covered by tropical vegetation. The small farms produce coffee, rice, corn. There is also production of milk and cheese.

There is one state school offering primary and middle levels. There are 6 municipal primary schools in the villages of Baêta, Campinho, Bernardo Corrêa, Catalão and Sals.

The streets of the municipal seat are paved with stone. There is drinking water supplied by springs and the urban area is covered by a sewage system. There is one health clinic in the municipal seat.

On the Municipal Human Development Index Caranaíba had a rating of 706 (2000).

- Life expectancy: 70 years in 2000
- Literacy rate: 85.3 in 2000
- State ranking: 518 out of 852 municipalities
- National ranking: 2,889 out of 5,138 municipalities

== See also ==
- List of municipalities in Minas Gerais
