= Mariano Procópio Museum =

Museum in Juiz de Fora, Minas Gerais, Brazil

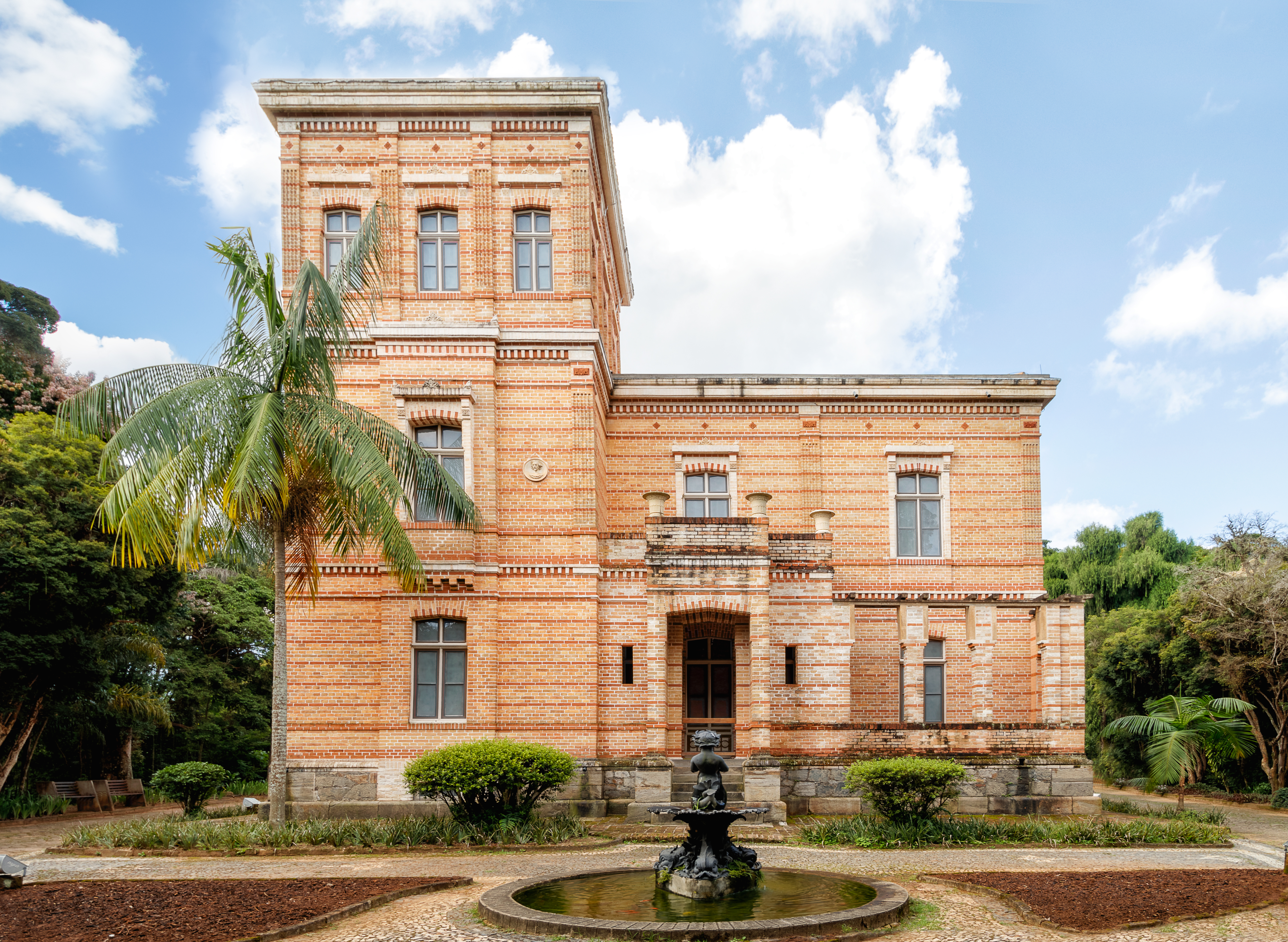
- Established: 1915
- Location: Brazil
- Coordinates: 21°44′46″S 43°21′35″W
- Website: http://mapro.pjf.mg.gov.br
- Location of Mariano Procópio Museum

The Mariano Procópio Museum (Portuguese: Museu Mariano Procópio) is a museum of art, history and the natural sciences located in Juiz de Fora, Minas Gerais, Brazil. Founded in 1915 by Alfredo Ferreira Lage, it was the first museum ever built in Minas Gerais, and the third museum ever built in Brazil. The museum contains approximately 45,000 specimens.

The museum consists of two buildings: The Villa Ferreira Lage, constructed between 1856 and 1861, and an annex built in 1922 specifically for the museum. Much of the collection and a large section of the gardens are currently closed for restoration.

Along with its art and armoury collections, the museum serves as an important collection of items of ecological interest, complete with large gardens and diverse examples of Brazilian flora.

== History ==
=== Villa Ferreira Lage ===
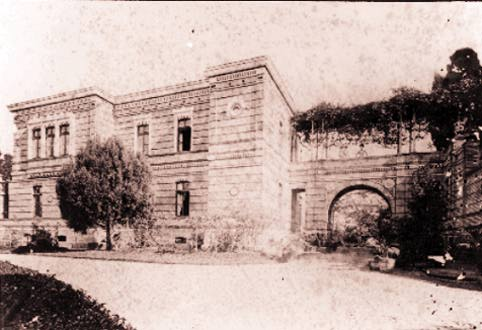
The Villa at the beginning of the 20th century

The history of the museum is linked to the construction in 1861 of the Estrada União e Indústria, a macadam road (now a highway) that connects Juiz de Fora and Petrópolis. Mariano Procópio, the engineer in charge of the road's construction, ordered the construction of the Villa Ferreira Lage in order to shelter Dom Pedro II, who would inaugurate the route. The construction could not be completed on time, however, so Procópio elected to house the royal family in his own residence. The Emperor would only see the completed structure on his second visit in 1869.

Situated in a park of 78,000 m^{2} (19 acres), the building was designed and built in the Renaissance style by the German architect, Carlos Augusto Gambs, head of the Estrada União e Indústria's engineers and architects. The building reflects an imposing style that was characteristic of buildings of this era, and was built on a raised plateau using large bricks. The interior features stucco and hardwood paneled walls adorned with various paintings. The villa retains much of its original exterior and interior.

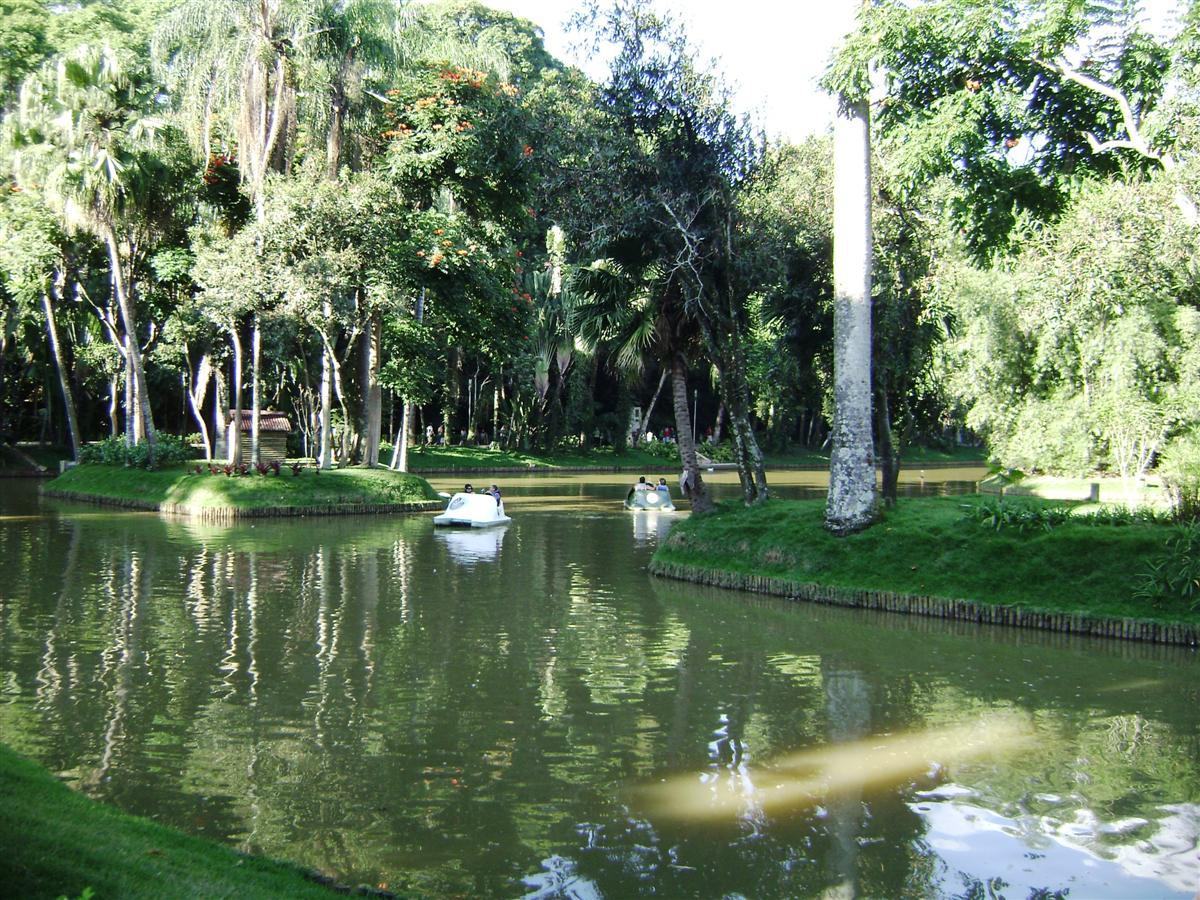
Lake inside the park Mariano Procopio

The Parque Mariano Procopio values Brazilian flora and was considered by the Swiss naturalist Jean Louis Rodolphe Agassiz (1807/1873), an expert in geology and paleontology, as "the paradise of the tropics."

=== The Museum ===
Upon the death of Mariano Procópio in 1872, his land was divided between his two sons, Frederico and Alfredo Ferreira Lage. Frederico built a large mansion on his land using imported materials from Europe. After his sudden death at only 39 years of age in 1901, the property was sold to the Estrada de Ferro Central do Brasil, which in turn transferred it to the Ministry of War, which built its regional military quarters on the plot.

The Villa Ferreira Lage and the current museum land were inherited by Alfredo, who intended to use the Villa to house a collection he had been accumulating since his childhood. Alfredo grew his collection quickly through the acquisition of pieces in auctions in Brazil and abroad, and through donations given by important figures such as the Duke of Caxias, Afonso Arinos, Rodolfo Bernardelli and Amelia Machado Cavalcanti de Albuquerque (wife of the Viscount of Cavalcanti.) Due to the growth of his collection, Alfredo ordered the construction of an attached building.

On June 23, 1921, the centennial of the birth of Mariano Procópio, Alfredo Ferreira Lage opened the museum to select visitors. In that year, Princess Isabel and the Count of Eu were in Juiz de Fora and were able to pay a visit to the museum, having just returned from a recently repealed exile imposed on the royal family by the new republican government in 1889. It was during this time that Alfredo announced his intention to donate his collection to the municipality.

On May 13, 1922, the museum officially opened to the public, including the collection in the newly built annex.

== Collection ==
The pieces featured in the museum reflect, in almost all their entirety, certain cultural influences from the 19th century and the beginning of the 20th century, matching the tastes of Alfredo Ferreira Lage. The museum counts itself as one of the principal exhibitions of the imperial period of Brazil - much of it originating from the Palácio São Cristóvão, the old residence of Dom Pedro II in Rio de Janeiro.

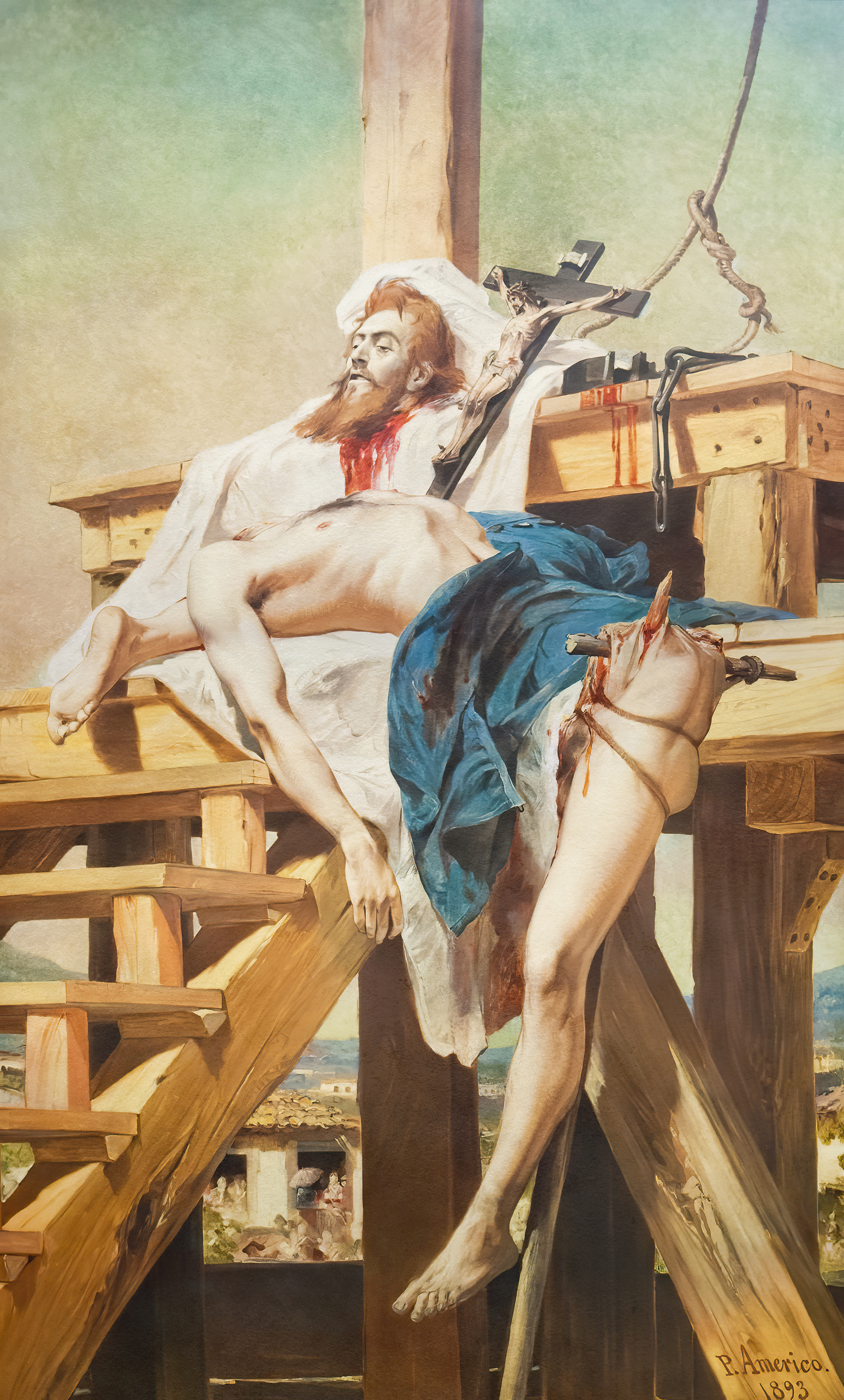
Tiradentes escuartejado (Tiradentes quartered) by Pedro Américo 1893.jpg

The collection of the Museum Mariano Procópio consists of about 50 000 objects of great historical, artistic and scientific value, including paintings, sculptures, prints, drawings, rare books, documents, photographs, furniture, silver, armor, coins, postcards, clothing, porcelain, crystal and pieces of Natural History.

It presents works by renowned European painters, including the French Charles-François Daubigny (1817/1878) and Jean-Honoré Fragonard (1732/1806), and the Dutch Willem Roelofs (1822/1897), alongside paintings by Brazilians such as Pedro Américo de Figueiredo e Melo (1843/1905), Rodolfo Amoedo (1857/1941) and Belmiro de Almeida (1858/1935). Sculptures and plaster casts, mostly made in the nineteenth century, by artists like Clodion, Marius Jean Mercié, Rodolfo Bernardelli, Modestino Kanto and Jose Otavio Correia Lima also appear throughout the Museum.
