= Estrada União e Indústria =

The Estrada de Rodagem União e Indústria (Union and Industry Highway) was the first macadamized road in Latin America, connecting the cities of Petrópolis and Juiz de Fora in the southeast of Brazil. It was opened on 23 June 1861 by Emperor Dom Pedro II.

== History ==
The project began in 1854 when Mariano Procópio Ferreira Lage was awarded the concession for the construction of the road from Petropolis. He created the União e Indústria (Union and Industry) company whose profits were to come from tolls charged to users.

Work began on 12 April 1856 in the presence of Dom Pedro II and the imperial family and a plaque commemorating this event still exists at the beginning of the Avenida Barão do Rio Branco in Juiz de Fora. The first section to be completed was opened on 18 April 1858 and connected Vila Teresa with Pedro do Rio, a total of 30.865 km (19.179 mi). From Pedro do Rio the road was extended 14 km (8.7 mi) to Posse in the following two years. Finally, on 23 June 1861, Dom Pedro II and representatives of the company travelled the full 144 km (89 mi) from Petrópolis to Juiz de Fora in a stagecoach.

The opening of the road was significant for Juiz de Fora, turning it into an important trading centre. It also gave rise to the first travel guide to Brazil "Doze Horas em Diligência - Guia do Viajante de Petrópolis a Juiz de Fora" (Twelve Hours in a Stagecoach – A Traveler's Guide to Petrópolis to Juiz de Fora) by Revert Henrique Klumb, published in 1872.

Over time the original road was modified in various stretches. Between Petropolis and Itaipava, and between Areal and Alberto Torres new roads were opened in the mid-twentieth century, and in 1980 the entire road was replaced by the BR-040 dual carriageway trunk from Rio de Janeiro to Brasília leaving the former União e Indústria with only local traffic.

== The road today ==
Today the road forms part of the road systems of the states of Rio de Janeiro and Minas Gerais. It is designated RJ-134 between Petrópolis and Areal, BR-393 in Três Rios, RJ-151 from Comendador Levy Gasparian to Mont Serrat, MG-874 between Simão Pereira and Matias Barbosa and finally BR-267 from Matias Barbosa to Juiz de Fora

Several buildings and bridges remain from the old União e Indústria, among them the Santana bridge in Alberto Torres, restored by the government. There are also the Domingos Soares da Veiga viaduct in Areal, the Bridge of Herons in Três Rios and the former Paraibuna station in Mont'Serrat, municipality of Comendador Levy Gasparian, which was built in 1856 for the change of mules. Located in a French-style cottage, since June 23, 1972, the station has housed the road museum, dedicated to the history of the União e Indústria and Brazil's trunk road network. A major exhibit is the stagecoach "Mazeppa" in which Pedro II made the first voyage on the road between Petrópolis and Juiz de Fora. "Mazeppa" is the only remaining coach of the União e Indústria.
