= Casa Grande, Minas Gerais =

Town and municipality in the state of Minas Gerais, Brazil

Coordinates: 20°47′34″S 43°55′48″W

- Municipality
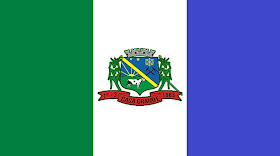
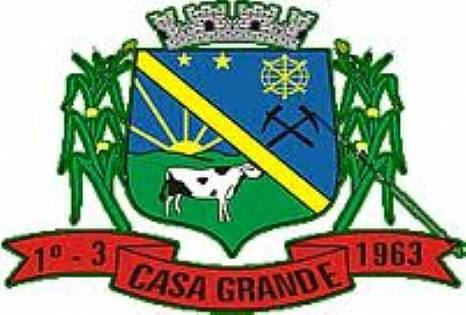
- Flag Coat of arms
- Interactive map of Casa Grande, Minas Gerais
- Country: Brazil
- State: Minas Gerais
- Region: Southeast

Population (2022 Census)
  - Total: 2,214
  - Estimate (2025): 2,260
- Time zone: UTC−3 (BRT)

Location of Casa Grande within Minas Gerais

Casa Grande is a Brazilian municipality located in the state of Minas Gerais. The city belongs to the mesoregion Metropolitana de Belo Horizonte and to the microregion of Conselheiro Lafaiete. As of 2025, the estimated population was 2,260.

== See also ==
- List of municipalities in Minas Gerais
