= Desterro de Entre Rios =

Town and municipality in the state of Minas Gerais, Brazil

Coordinates: 20°39′36″S 44°19′58″W

- Municipality
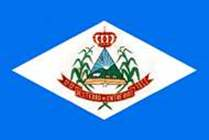
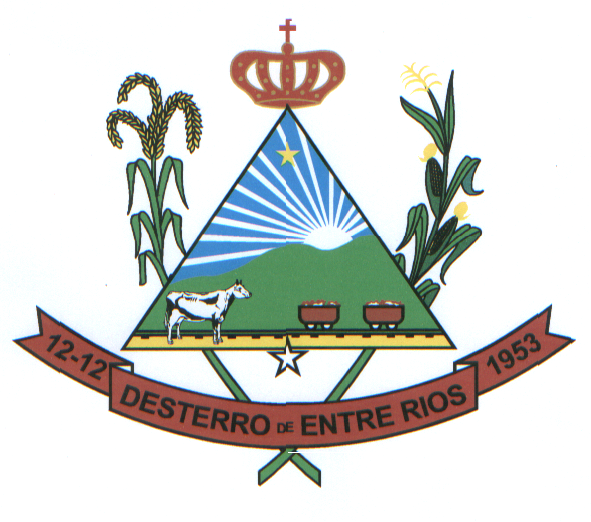
- Flag Coat of arms
- Interactive map of Desterro de Entre Rios
- Country: Brazil
- State: Minas Gerais
- Region: Southeast

Population (2022 Census)
  - Total: 7,653
  - Estimate (2025): 7,941
- Time zone: UTC−3 (BRT)

Location of Desterro de Entre Rios within Minas Gerais

Desterro de Entre Rios is a Brazilian municipality located in the state of Minas Gerais. The city belongs to the mesoregion Metropolitana de Belo Horizonte and to the microregion of Conselheiro Lafaiete. As of 2025, the estimated population was 7,941.

== See also ==
- List of municipalities in Minas Gerais
