= Queluzito =

Human settlement in Brazil

Coordinates: 20°44′24″S 43°53′02″W

- Municipality
- Interactive map of Queluzito
- Country: Brazil
- State: Minas Gerais
- Region: Southeast

Population (2022 Census)
  - Total: 1,770
  - Estimate (2025): 1,796
- Time zone: UTC−3 (BRT)

Location of Queluzito within Minas Gerais

Queluzito is a Brazilian municipality located in the state of Minas Gerais. The city belongs to the mesoregion Metropolitana de Belo Horizonte and to the microregion of Conselheiro Lafaiete. As of 2025, the estimated population was 1,796.

== See also ==
- List of municipalities in Minas Gerais
