= Alto Rio Doce =

Municipality in Minas Gerais, Brazil

Coordinates: 21°02′S 43°25′W

- Municipality
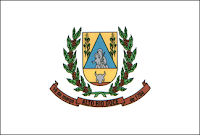
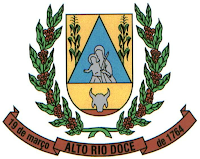
- Flag Coat of arms
- Interactive map of Alto Rio Doce
- Country: Brazil
- State: Minas Gerais
- Region: Southeast

Population (2022 Census)
  - Total: 10,891
  - Estimate (2025): 10,931
- Time zone: UTC−3 (BRT)

Location of Alto Rio Doce within Minas Gerais

Alto Rio Doce is a Brazilian municipality in the state of Minas Gerais. As of 2025 its population is estimated to be 10,931.

== See also ==
- List of municipalities in Minas Gerais
