= Arco Metropolitano do Rio de Janeiro =

Highway in Rio de Janeiro, Brazil

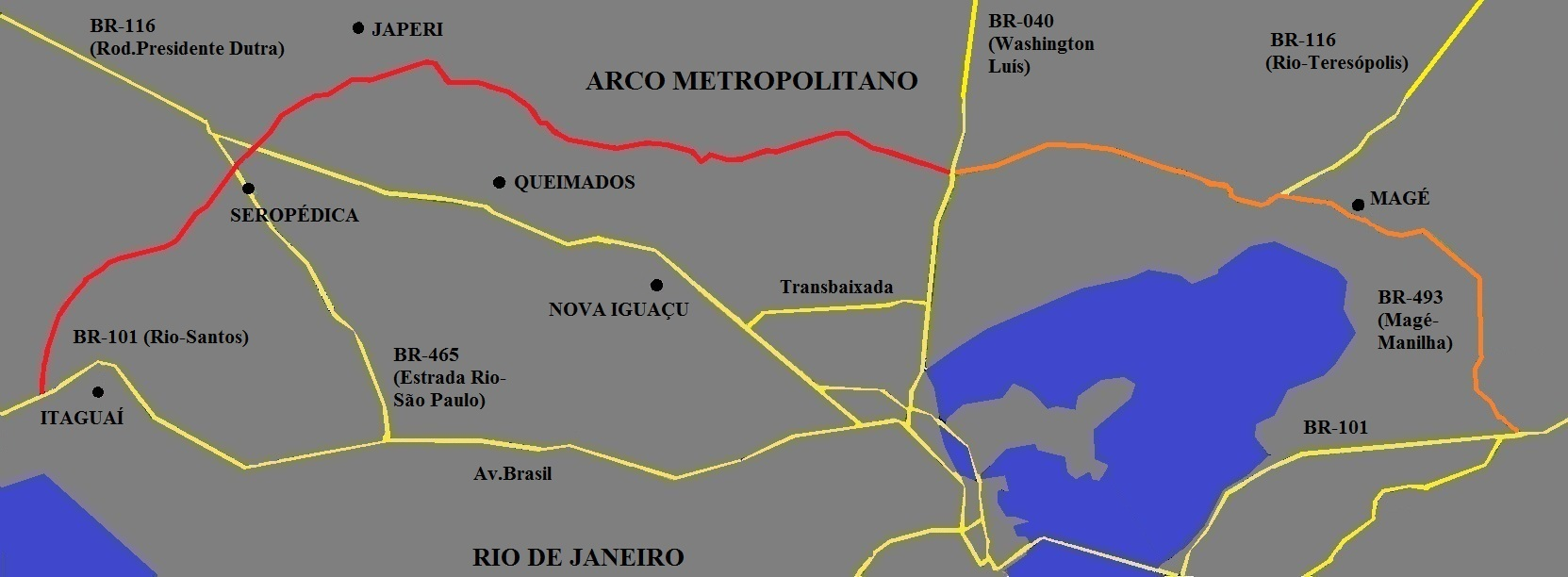
Arco Metropolitano

The Arco Metropolitano do Rio de Janeiro (Also known simply as Arco Metropolitano) is a highway designed to connect the five main highways that cross the municipality of Rio de Janeiro.

The project was divided in two stages. The first stretch of 71 km will link highways Washington Luís and Rio-Santos. It is budgeted at US$800 million and will initially be implemented in cooperation between the State Government of Rio de Janeiro and the DNIT.

When the project is completed the arch should reach a total of 145 km. Unlike Rodoanel Mário Covas in São Paulo, the Metropolitan Arch will not have a southern stretch, since it will initiate in both ends near a coastal area close to the Atlantic Ocean.

In 2009, with construction already started, 22 archaeological sites were found, which led to construction delays so that all sites could be cataloged, and the materials found, preserved. While one site will be kept, the others should only have the material removed to museums.

Construction was expected to be completed in 2010 but this goal was not achieved. Construction of the Arch was only accelerated from 2012 on, and in March 2014, Arch had 92% of works completed. Currently the biggest problem of the Arc project is 25.5 miles from the BR-493 (Magé-Manilha) that will be duplicated by the Union, but his works were not started until today. Now the federal government says that this stretch will be ready only in December 2016, over 8 years after the start of work. Without duplicating the Magé-Manilha, the Arc will have traffic jams on this stretch, and will operate with problems and congestion.

There is also a proposal to extend the Arco to Maricá, covering portions of the RJ-106 and 114 and BR-101, which is under studies and project viability definition, under the responsibility of DNIT.

On July 1, 2014, the first 71 km between the Cities of Itaguaí and Duque de Caxias was inaugurated incomplete and with road work in many parts as well as no public illumination. This has been seen as an electioneering manner, being close to the start of the election campaign for 2014. Initially, the expected completion date for the Arco Metropolitano was July 2017. After years of neglect by Brazil's Federal Government, duplication works began on 6 of the 25 km of the Magé-Manilha portion in 2022, and the total duplication of that section, now under concession, should occur by 2026.

== Project objectives ==
The main objectives of the Metropolitan Arch are:

- Connecting the various highways in and out of Rio de Janeiro city. It should facilitate the flow of traffic, even in case of problems on some routes;
- Avoid unnecessary entry of vehicles that are only passing through the city of Rio de Janeiro, thereby reducing congestion on highways in the capital of Rio de Janeiro, on Ponte Rio-Niteroi and Via Dutra;
- Provide express access to the Port of Itaguaí;
- Develop areas of Baixada Fluminense that are now economically irrelevant.

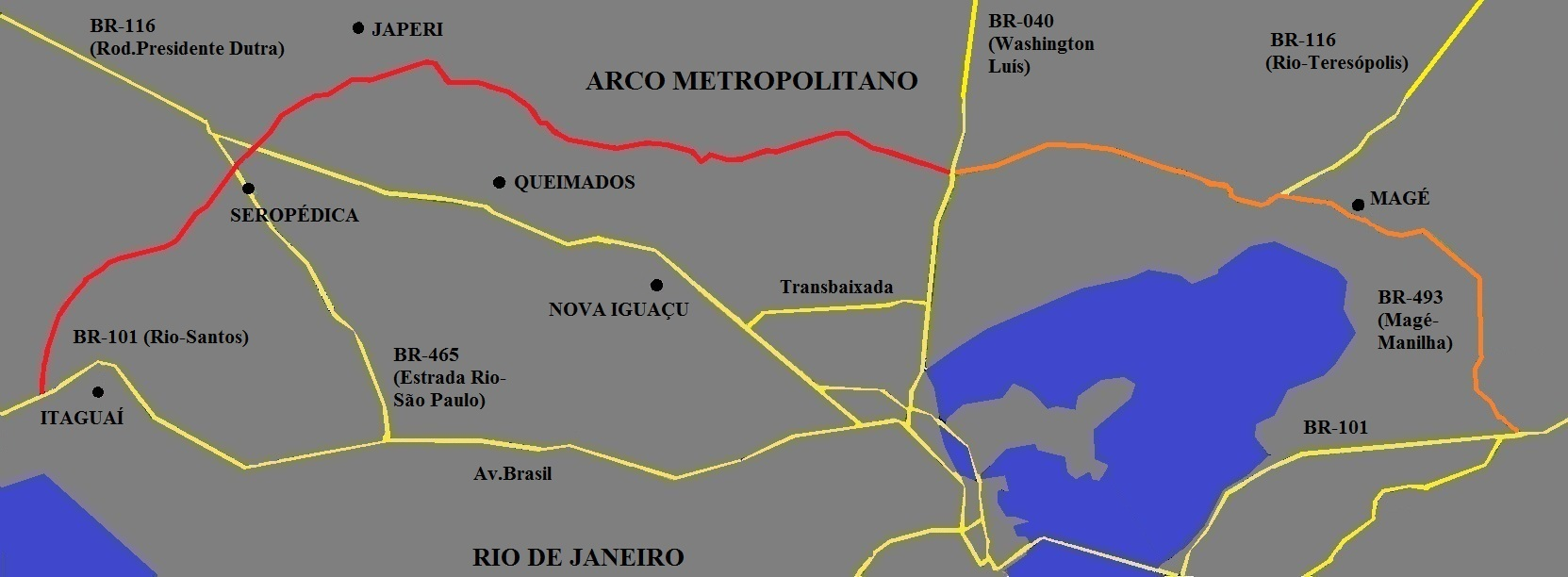
Arco Metropolitano

== See also ==
- Rio de Janeiro
