= Catas Altas da Noruega =

Municipality of Brazil

Coordinates: 20°41′24″S 43°29′52″W

- Municipality
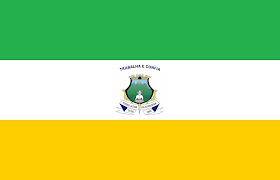
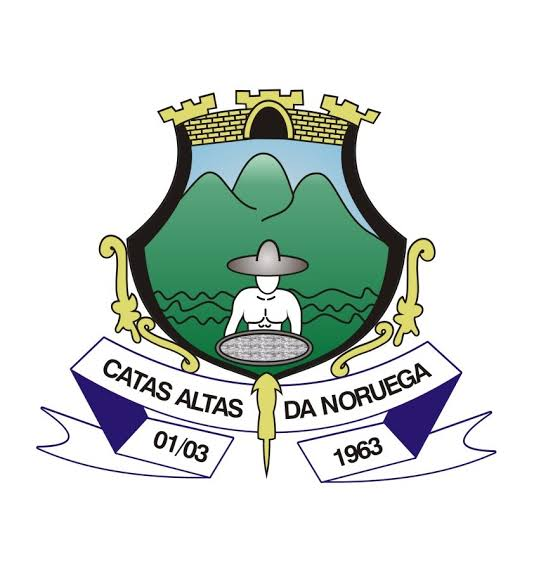
- Flag Coat of arms
- Interactive map of Catas Altas da Noruega
- Country: Brazil
- State: Minas Gerais
- Region: Southeast

Population (2022 Census)
  - Total: 3,110
  - Estimate (2025): 3,124
- Time zone: UTC−3 (BRT)

Location of Catas Altas da Noruega within Minas Gerais

Catas Altas da Noruega is a Brazilian municipality located in the state of Minas Gerais. The city belongs to the mesoregion Metropolitana de Belo Horizonte and to the microregion of Conselheiro Lafaiete. As of 2025, the estimated population was 3,124.

== See also ==
- List of municipalities in Minas Gerais
