= Ressaquinha =

Town and municipality in the state of Minas Gerais, Brazil

Coordinates: 21°03′46″S 43°45′46″W

- Municipality
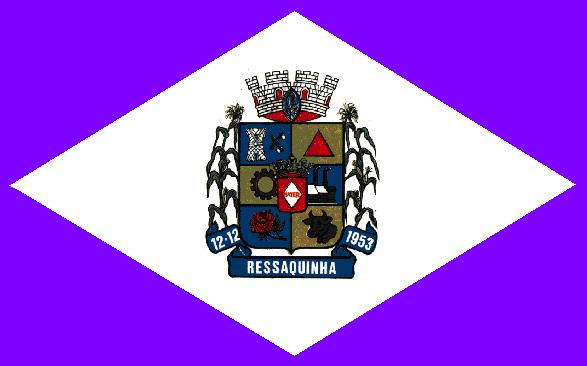
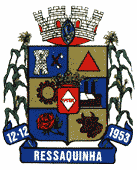
- Flag Coat of arms
- Interactive map of Ressaquinha
- Country: Brazil
- State: Minas Gerais
- Region: Southeast

Population (2022 Census)
  - Total: 4,548
  - Estimate (2025): 4,640
- Time zone: UTC−3 (BRT)

Location of Ressaquinha within Minas Gerais

Ressaquinha is a Brazilian municipality located in the state of Minas Gerais. The city belongs to the mesoregion of Campo das Vertentes and to the microregion of Barbacena. In 2025, the estimated population was 4,640.

== See also ==
- List of municipalities in Minas Gerais
