= Lamim =

Brazilian municipality located in the state of Minas Gerais

Coordinates: 20°47′S 43°28′W

- Municipality
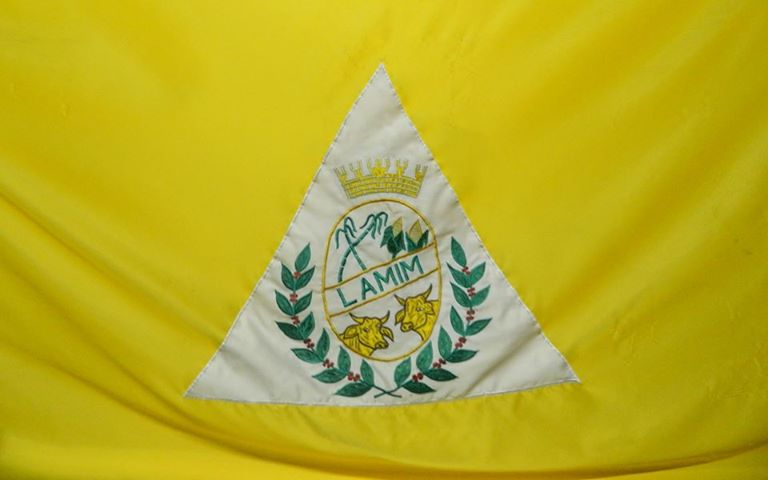
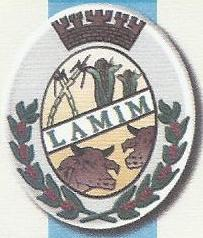
- Flag Coat of arms
- Interactive map of Lamim
- Country: Brazil
- State: Minas Gerais
- Region: Southeast

Population (2022 Census)
  - Total: 3,184
  - Estimate (2025): 3,213
- Time zone: UTC−3 (BRT)

Location of Lamim within Minas Gerais

Lamim is a Brazilian municipality located in the state of Minas Gerais. The city belongs to the mesoregion of Zona da Mata and to the microregion of Viçosa. As of 2025, the estimated population was 3,213.

== See also ==
- List of municipalities in Minas Gerais
