= Cristiano Otoni =

Town and municipality in the state of Minas Gerais, Brazil

Coordinates: 20°49′55″S 43°48′21″W

- Municipality
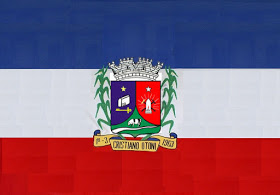
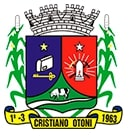
- Flag Coat of arms
- Interactive map of Cristiano Otoni
- Country: Brazil
- State: Minas Gerais
- Region: Southeast

Population (2022 Census)
  - Total: 4,667
  - Estimate (2025): 4,719
- Time zone: UTC−3 (BRT)

Location of Cristiano Otoni within Minas Gerais

Cristiano Otoni is a Brazilian municipality located in the state of Minas Gerais. The city belongs to the mesoregion Metropolitana de Belo Horizonte and the microregion of Conselheiro Lafaiete. As of 2020, the estimated population was 4,719.

== See also ==
- List of municipalities in Minas Gerais
