= Simão Pereira =

Coordinates: 21°58′S 43°19′W

- Municipality
- Interactive map of Simão Pereira
- Country: Brazil
- Region: Southeast
- State: Minas Gerais
- Mesoregion: Vale do Rio Doce

Population (2020)
  - Total: 2,618
- Time zone: UTC−3 (BRT)

Simão Pereira is a municipality in the state of Minas Gerais in the Southeast region of Brazil.

== See also ==
- List of municipalities in Minas Gerais
