= Areal, Rio de Janeiro =

Areal
- Municipality
- Município de Areal
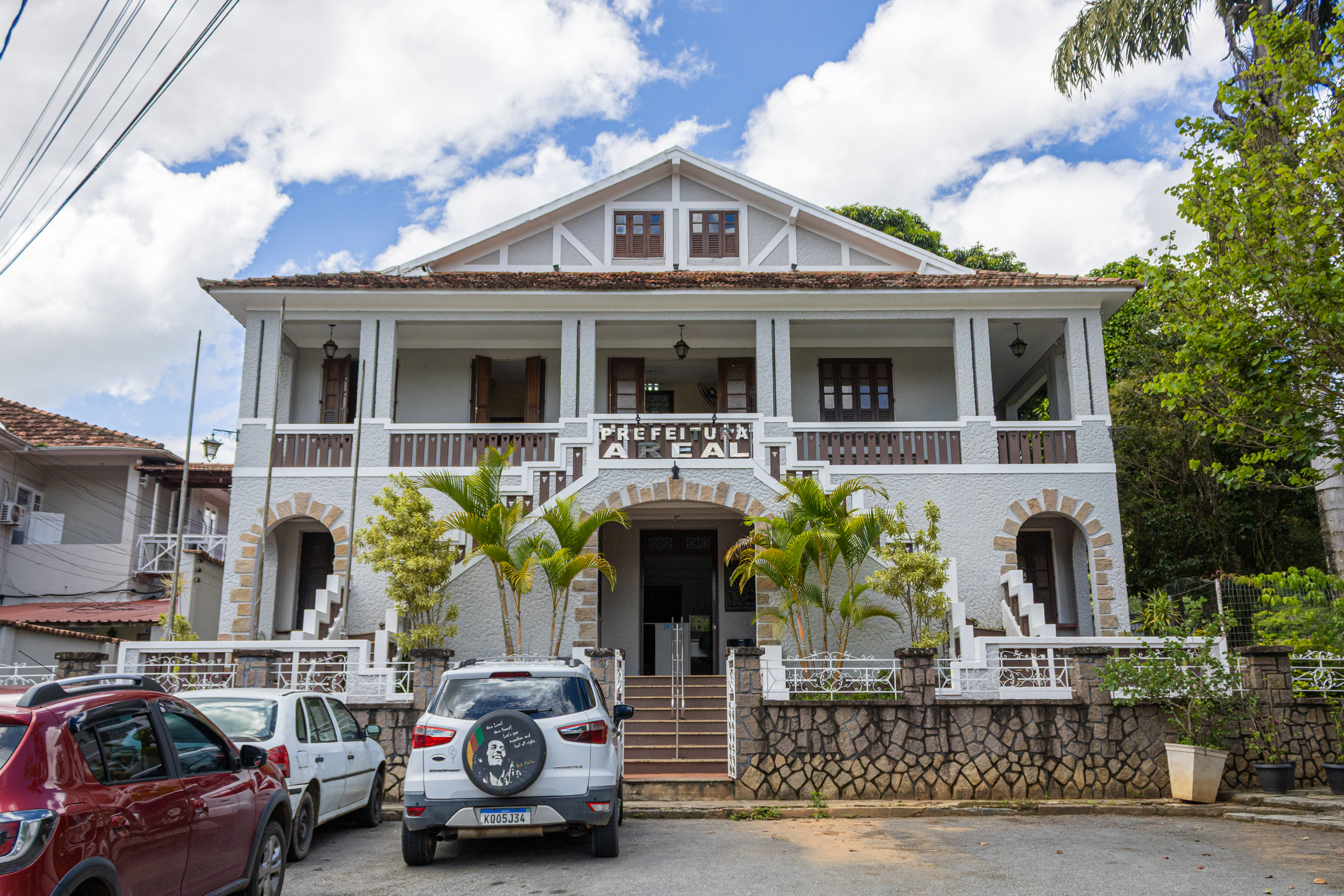

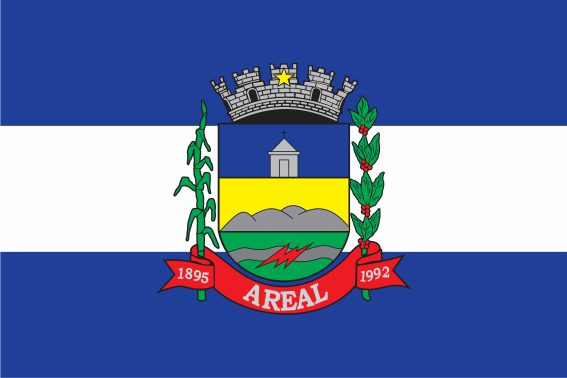
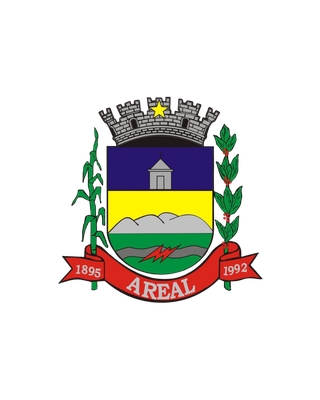
- Flag Coat of arms

- Location of Areal in the state of Rio de Janeiro

- Location of Areal in Brazil
- Coordinates: 22°13′51″S 43°06′21″W
- Country: Brazil
- Region: Southeast
- State: Rio de Janeiro

Government
  - Prefeito: José Augusto Bernardes Lima (PP)

Area
  - Total: 110.919 km^{2} (42.826 sq mi)
- Elevation: 444 m (1,457 ft)

Population (2020)
  - Total: 12,669
- Time zone: UTC-3 (UTC-3)

Areal (Portuguese pronunciation: [aɾeˈaw] or [aɾiˈaw]) is a municipality located in the Brazilian state of Rio de Janeiro. Its population was 12,669 (2020) and its area is 111 km^{2} (43 sq mi).
