= Comendador Levy Gasparian =

- Municipality
- Município de Comendador Levy Gasparian
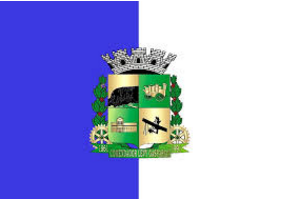
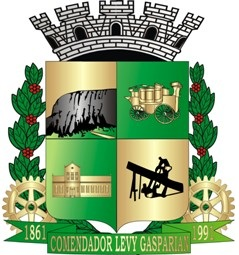
- Flag Coat of arms
- Nickname: Levy
- Location of Comendador Levy Gasparian in the state of Rio de Janeiro

- Location of Comendador Levy Gasparian in Brazil
- Coordinates: 22°01′44″S 43°12′18″W
- Country: Brazil
- Region: Southeast
- State: Rio de Janeiro

Government
  - Prefeito: Valter Lavinas (PTB)

Area
  - Total: 108.639 km^{2} (41.946 sq mi)
- Elevation: 355 m (1,165 ft)

Population (2022)
  - Total: 8,741
- Time zone: UTC-3 (UTC-3)

Comendador Levy Gasparian (Portuguese pronunciation: [komẽdɐˈdoʁ leˈvi ɡɐspaɾiˈɐ̃]) is a municipality located in the Brazilian state of Rio de Janeiro. Its population was 8,741 (2022) and its area is 108 km^{2} (42 sq mi).
