= Carandaí =

Town and municipality in the state of Minas Gerais, Brazil

Coordinates: 20°57′16″S 43°47′29″W

- Municipality
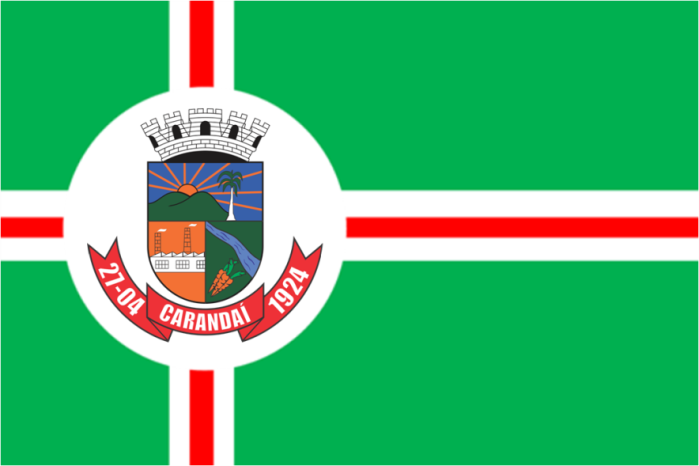
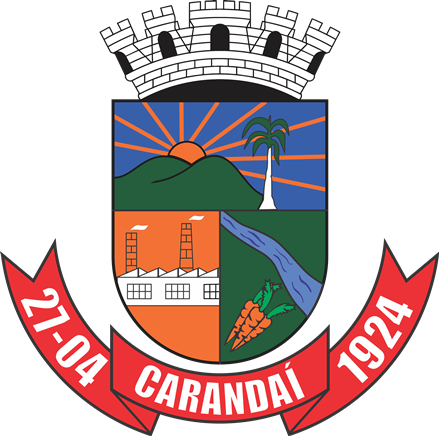
- Flag Coat of arms
- Interactive map of Carandaí
- Country: Brazil
- State: Minas Gerais
- Region: Southeast

Population (2022 Census)
  - Total: 23,812
  - Estimate (2025): 24,403
- Time zone: UTC−3 (BRT)

Location of Carandaí within Minas Gerais

Carandaí is a Brazilian municipality located in the state of Minas Gerais. The population in 2025 was 24,403 people in a total area of 487 km^{2}. The city belongs to the mesoregion of Campo das Vertentes and to the microregion of Barbacena.

Carandaí lies on the important BR-040 highway, 35 km. north of Barbacena. The main economic activities are services, cattle raising, milk and cheese production, small transformation industries, and the growing of flowers, fruits, vegetables, corn, coffee, potatoes, and beans. In 2005 there were 3 financial institutions. In the health sector there were 12 clinics and one hospital with 51 beds (2005). In the educational sector there were 23 primary schools and 3 middle schools. There were 2 campuses of private institutions of higher learning with 168 students in 2005.

Municipal Human Development Index

- MHDI: .760
- Ranking in the state: 209 out of 853 municipalities
- Ranking in the country: 1,588 out of 5,138 municipalities
- Life expectancy: 72 (2000)
- Literacy rate: 90 (2000) See Frigoletto

== See also ==
- List of municipalities in Minas Gerais
