= Capela Nova =

Town and municipality in the state of Minas Gerais, Brazil

Coordinates: 20°55′22″S 43°37′04″W

- Municipality
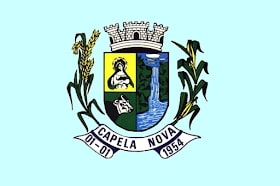
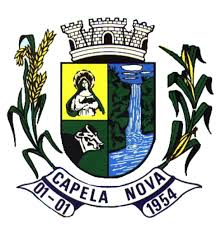
- Flag Coat of arms
- Interactive map of Capela Nova
- Country: Brazil
- State: Minas Gerais
- Region: Southeast

Population (2022 Census)
  - Total: 4,362
  - Estimate (2025): 4,397
- Time zone: UTC−3 (BRT)

Location of Capela Nova within Minas Gerais

Capela Nova is a Brazilian municipality located in the state of Minas Gerais. Its population as of 2025 is estimated to be 4,397 people living in an area of 111 km^{2}. The elevation is 935 m. The city belongs to the mesoregion of Campo das Vertentes and to the microregion of Barbacena, which lies 58 km to the south.

== See also ==
- List of municipalities in Minas Gerais
