= Santana dos Montes =

Human settlement in Brazil

Coordinates: 20°47′16″S 43°41′31″W

- Municipality
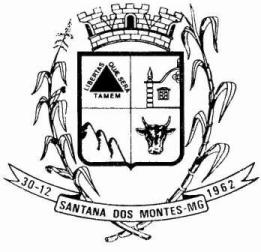
- Coat of arms
- Interactive map of Santana dos Montes
- Country: Brazil
- State: Minas Gerais
- Region: Southeast

Population (2022 Census)
  - Total: 3,469
  - Estimate (2025): 3,490
- Time zone: UTC−3 (BRT)

Location of Santana dos Montes within Minas Gerais

Santana dos Montes is a Brazilian municipality located in the state of Minas Gerais. The city belongs to the mesoregion Metropolitana de Belo Horizonte and to the microregion of Conselheiro Lafaiete. As of 2025, the estimated population was 3,490.

== See also ==
- List of municipalities in Minas Gerais
