= Conselheiro Lafaiete =

- Municipality
- Municipality of Conselheiro Lafaiete
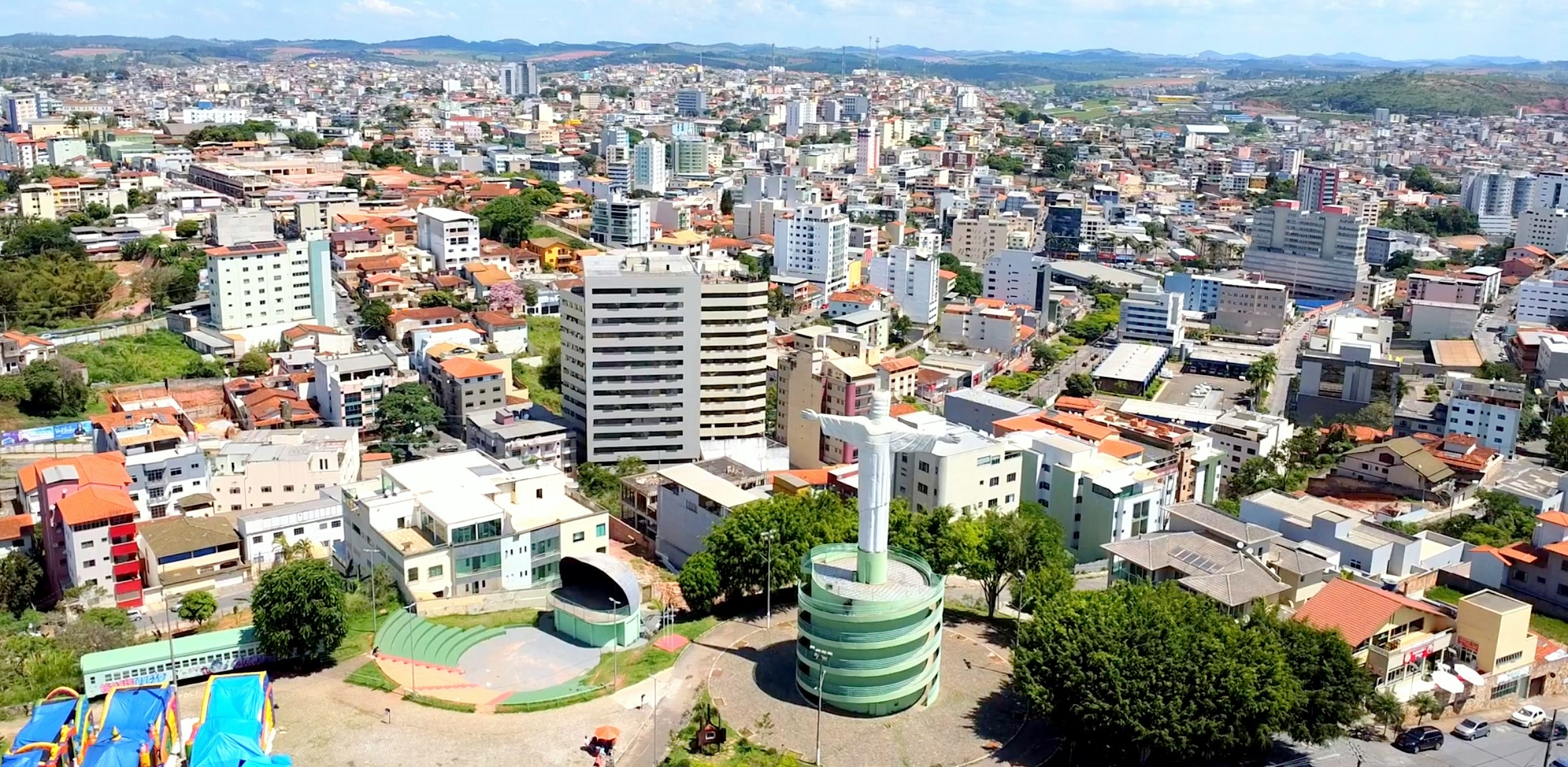
- View of Conselheiro Lafaiete

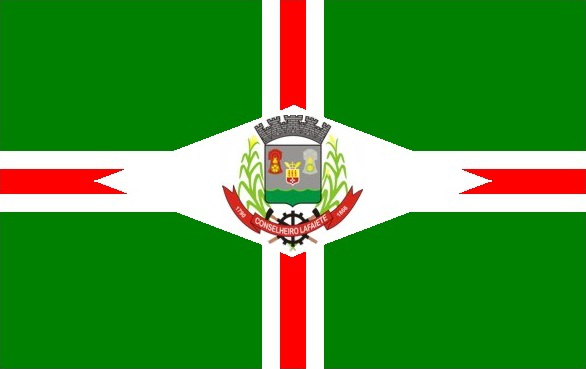
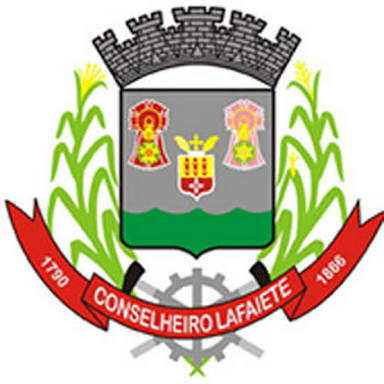
- Flag Coat of arms

- Location in Minas Gerais
- Coordinates: 20°39′36″S 43°47′09″W
- Country: Brazil
- State: Minas Gerais
- Region: Southeast
- Intermediate Region: Barbacena
- Immediate Region: Conselheiro Lafaiete

Area
  - Total: 370.246 km^{2} (142.953 sq mi)
- Elevation: 995 m (3,264 ft)

Population (2022 Census)
  - Total: 131,621
  - Estimate (2025): 138,946
  - Density: 355.496/km^{2} (920.731/sq mi)
- Time zone: UTC−3 (BRT)

Conselheiro Lafaiete is a city of the state of Minas Gerais, Brazil. It was known as Queluz until 1934, when it was renamed by decree, as a tribute to Counselor Lafayette Rodrigues Pereira.

It is situated 96 km south from Belo Horizonte, capital of Minas Gerais, in one of the most important economic areas of Brazil. The population was 131,621 inhabitants, in 2022 Census. It is one of the most populated cities of Minas Gerais.

== Geography ==
According to the modern (2017) geographic classification by Brazil's National Institute of Geography and Statistics (IBGE), the municipality belongs to the Immediate Geographic Region of Conselheiro Lafaiete, in the Intermediate Geographic Region of Barbacena.

== See also ==
- List of municipalities in Minas Gerais
