= Immediate Geographic Region of Ubá =

Urban administrative region in Minas Gerais, Brazil

Immediate Geographic Region of Ubá, in the state of Minas Gerais, Brazil.

The Immediate Geographic Region of Ubá is one of 10 immediate geographic regions in the Intermediate Geographic Region of Juiz de Fora, one of 70 immediate geographic regions in the Brazilian state of Minas Gerais and one of 509 of Brazil, created by the National Institute of Geography and Statistics (IBGE) in 2017.

== Municipalities ==
It comprises 17 municipalities.

- Brás Pires
- Divinésia
- Dores do Turvo
- Guarani
- Guidoval
- Guiricema
- Mercês
- Piraúba
- Rio Pomba
- Rodeiro
- São Geraldo
- Senador Firmino
- Silveirânia
- Tabuleiro
- Tocantins
- Ubá
- Visconde do Rio Branco
