= Mercês, Minas Gerais =

Municipality in Minas Gerais, Brazil

Mercês
- Municipality
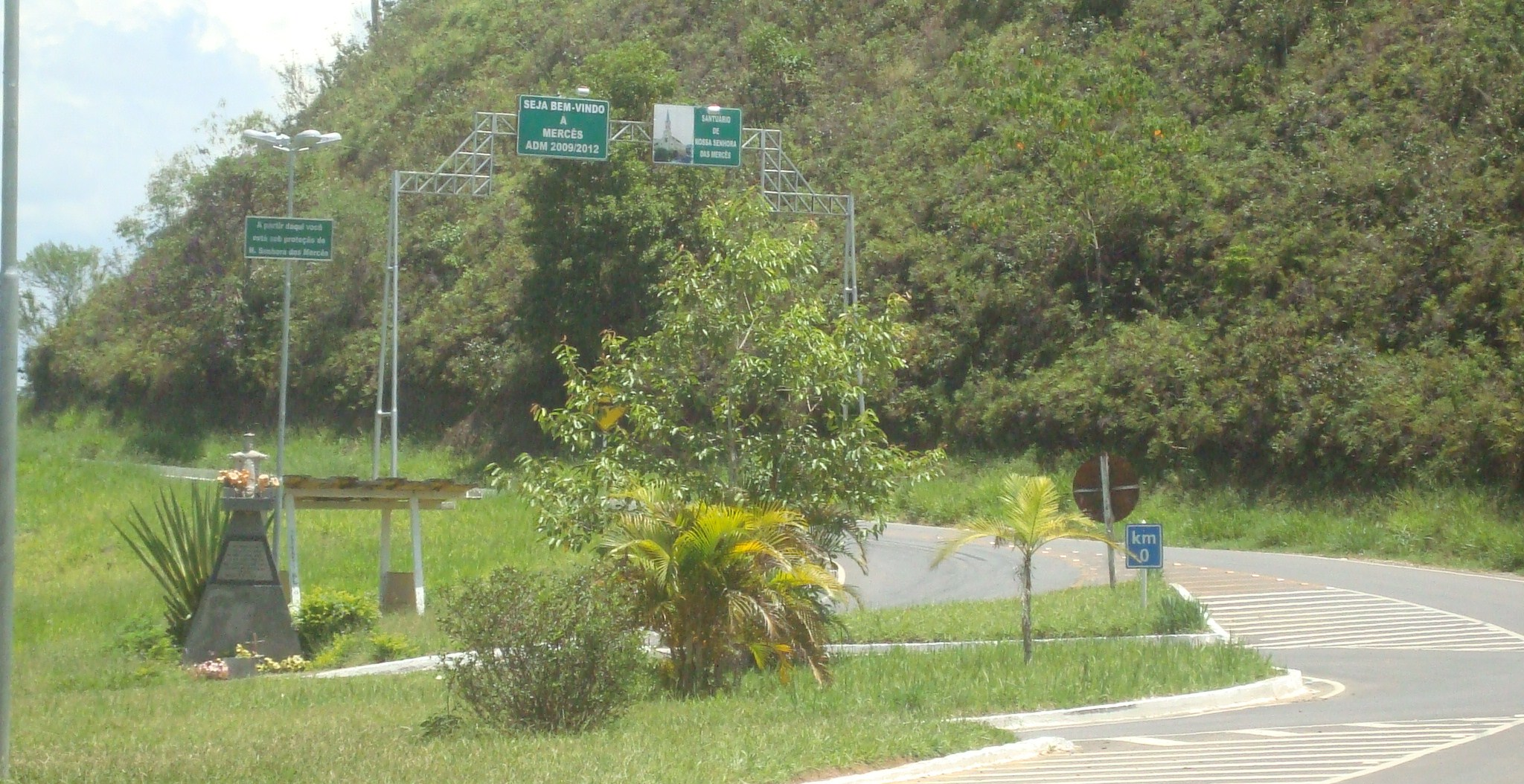
- AMG-0510 near its junction with MGC-265

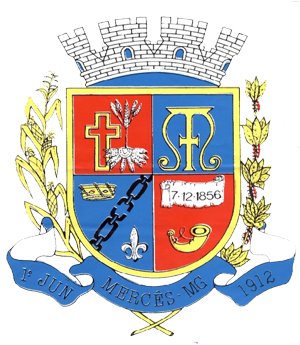
- Coat of arms

- Location in Minas Gerais

- Location in Brazil
- Coordinates: 21°11′38″S 43°20′27″W
- Country: Brazil
- Region: Southeast
- State: Minas Gerais
- Intermediate region: Juiz de Fora
- Immediate region: Ubá
- Parish established: 7 April 1841
- Municipality created: 30 August 1911
- Installed: 1 June 1912
- City status: 10 September 1925
- District: Mercês

Government
  - Interim mayor: José Elizio Ribeiro Coelho (since 2026) (PSD)

Area
  - Total: 348.271 km^{2} (134.468 sq mi)

Population (2022)
  - Total: 10,373
  - Estimate (2025): 10,615
  - Density: 29.784/km^{2} (77.141/sq mi)
- Demonym: mercesano

Socioeconomic indicators
  - HDI (2010): 0.664
  - GDP per capita (2023): R$18,257.81
- Time zone: UTC−3 (BRT)
- Postal code: 36190-000
- Area code: 32
- Website: www.merces.mg.gov.br

Mercês is a municipality in the Zona da Mata of southeastern Minas Gerais, Brazil. It belongs to the Immediate Geographic Region of Ubá and the Intermediate Geographic Region of Juiz de Fora. The municipality covers 348.271 km^{2} (134.468 sq mi). Its population was 10,373 in the 2022 census and was estimated at 10,615 in 2025.

The settlement grew around a chapel dedicated to Our Lady of Mercy and became a parish in 1841. Mercês was separated from Rio Pomba in 1911 and installed as a municipality in 1912. A railway branch from Palmira, now Santos Dumont, reached the town in 1914 and remained in service until 1969.

== History ==
The settlement grew around a chapel dedicated to Our Lady of Mercy. The centenary of the early chapel was celebrated in 1869. Provincial Law No. 209 made Nossa Senhora das Mercês a parish on 7 April 1841. It remained part of Pomba, now Rio Pomba.

Regular postal service began in 1858. State Law No. 556 separated Mercês from Pomba and created a municipality on 30 August 1911. The municipality was installed on 1 June 1912.

A railway branch from Palmira reached Mercês in 1914. The line had been planned to continue toward Piranga, but Mercês remained its terminus. The first school group opened in 1917. Telegraph service, a potable-water system, and electric lighting followed in 1918. State Law No. 893 gave the municipal seat city status in 1925.

The railway branch closed on 28 February 1969.

== Geography ==
Mercês covers 348.271 km^{2} (134.468 sq mi) in the western Zona da Mata. It borders Alto Rio Doce, Dores do Turvo, Silveirânia, Rio Pomba, Tabuleiro, Aracitaba, Paiva, Santa Bárbara do Tugúrio, and Desterro do Melo.

Elevations range from about 488 m (1,601 ft) beside the Pomba River to 1,007 m (3,304 ft) in the north. Most of the terrain is rolling or strongly rolling, with flatter ground along the Pomba River and its tributaries.

The municipality spans two drainage systems. The Pomba and Paciência rivers and nearby streams drain toward the Paraíba do Sul. The Laranjeira and Santo Antônio streams and the Palestina creek belong to the Piranga basin, which drains toward the Doce River.

== Economy ==
Services outside public administration supplied 42% of the municipality's gross value added in 2021. Public administration, public education, public health, and social security supplied 35.5%, agriculture 12.4%, and industry 10.1%.

The municipality's GDP per capita was R$18,257.81 in 2023.

== Culture ==
The Jubilee of Our Lady of Mercy is held each September at the parish church and ends on the patronal feast on 24 September. Its program includes Masses and processions.

== See also ==
- List of municipalities in Minas Gerais
