= 2026 Zona da Mata floods =

2026 floods and landslides in Brazil

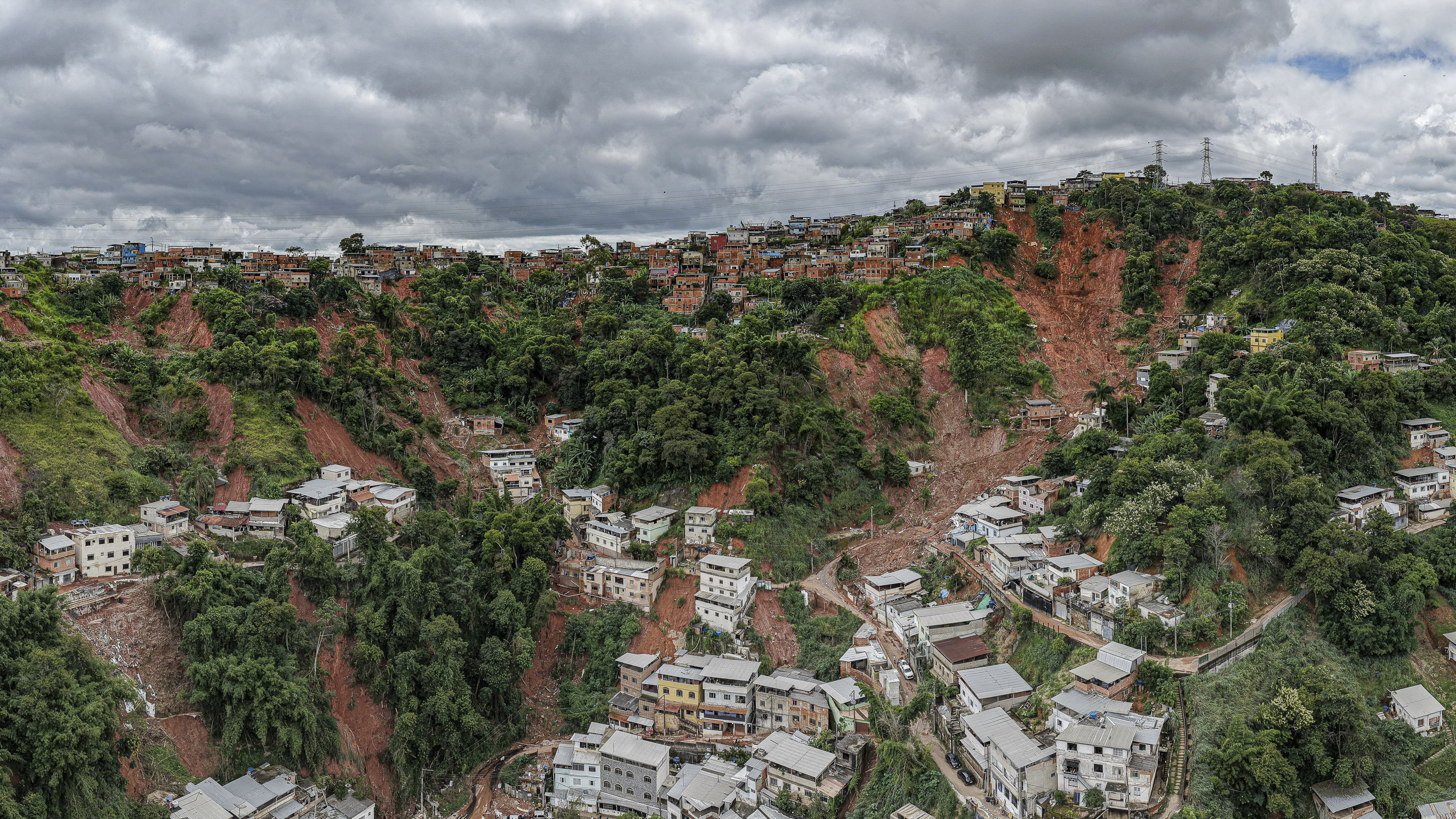
- Area affected by landslide in Juiz de Fora
- Date: February 2026
- Location: Zona da Mata (mainly Juiz de Fora and Ubá), Minas Gerais, Brazil
- Deaths: 73

In February 2026, floods and landslides caused by extreme precipitation events occurred in the Zona da Mata region of the state of Minas Gerais, Brazil, leaving 73 people dead. The disaster is the deadliest of its type in the country since the Rio Grande do Sul floods in 2024.

The region had already experienced above-average rainfall in the preceding weeks, and further episodes of extreme precipitation followed in the days thereafter. February 2026 became the wettest month ever recorded in Juiz de Fora, with total rainfall exceeding the monthly average by four times, according to the Brazilian National Institute of Meteorology (INMET). The floods and landslides left entire neighbourhoods cut off, displaced more than 5,500 residents, and left hundreds homeless.

== Description ==
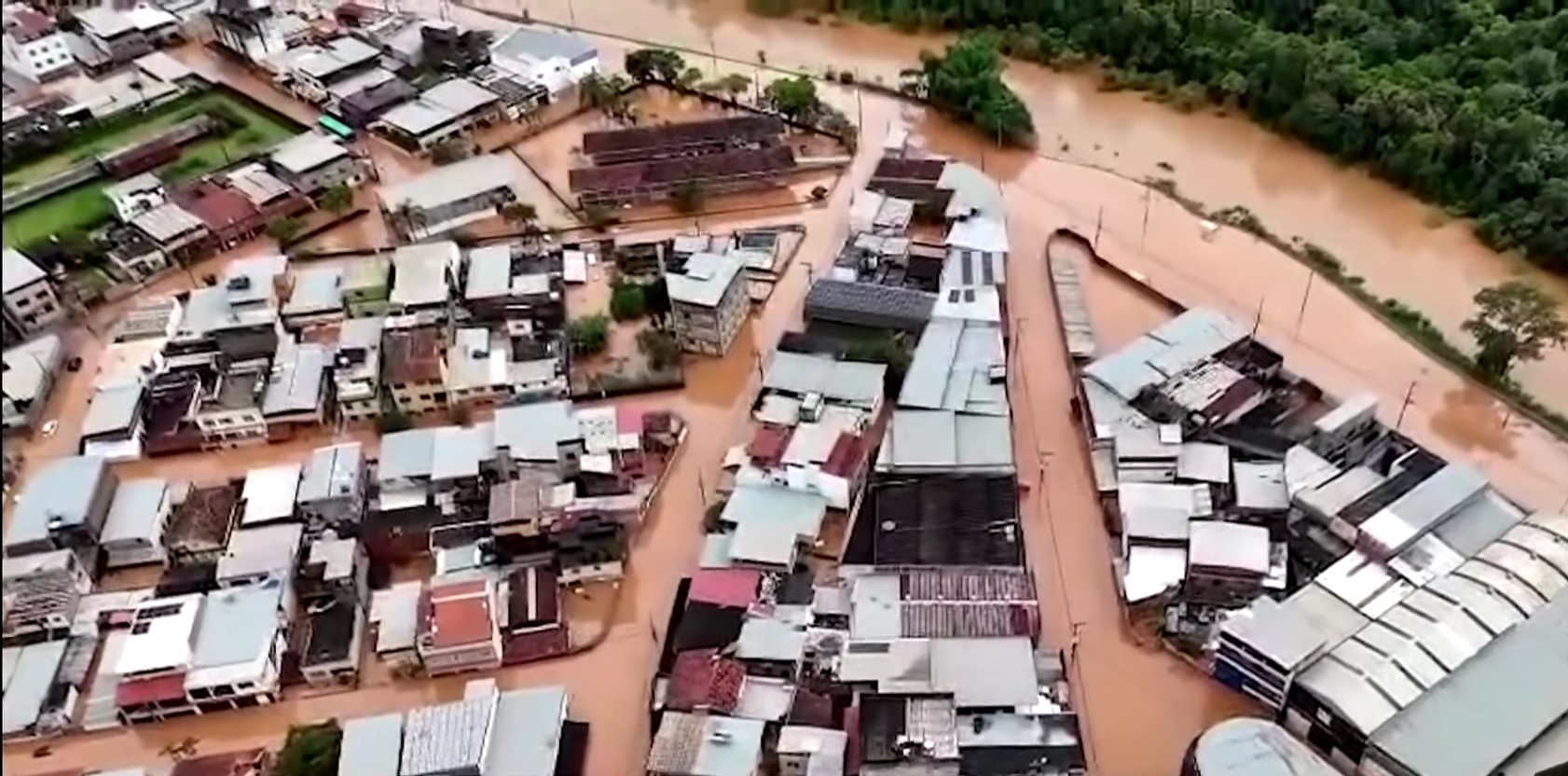
Flooding on the banks of the Paraibuna River in the Industrial neighborhood, Juiz de Fora

According to National Institute of Meteorology (INMET), the accumulated rainfall for February 2026 at the weather station in Juiz de Fora, up to the 28th, was 752.4 mm, with the average for the entire month in the city being 170 mm. Between 9 a.m. on 22 February and 9 a.m. on 23 February, 89 mm of rainfall was recorded. At the daily reading at 9 a.m. on 24 February, a further 138.6 mm was observed, totalling 227.6 mm in 48 hours in the municipality. At noon on the 24th, Cemaden rain gauges measured accumulated rainfall of 221.72 mm in the Cidade Universitária neighbourhood, 216.19 mm in Nossa Senhora de Lourdes and 215.43 mm in the city centre over the previous 48 hours. However, most of this rainfall was concentrated in a six-hour period between the previous night and early morning.

== Consequences ==
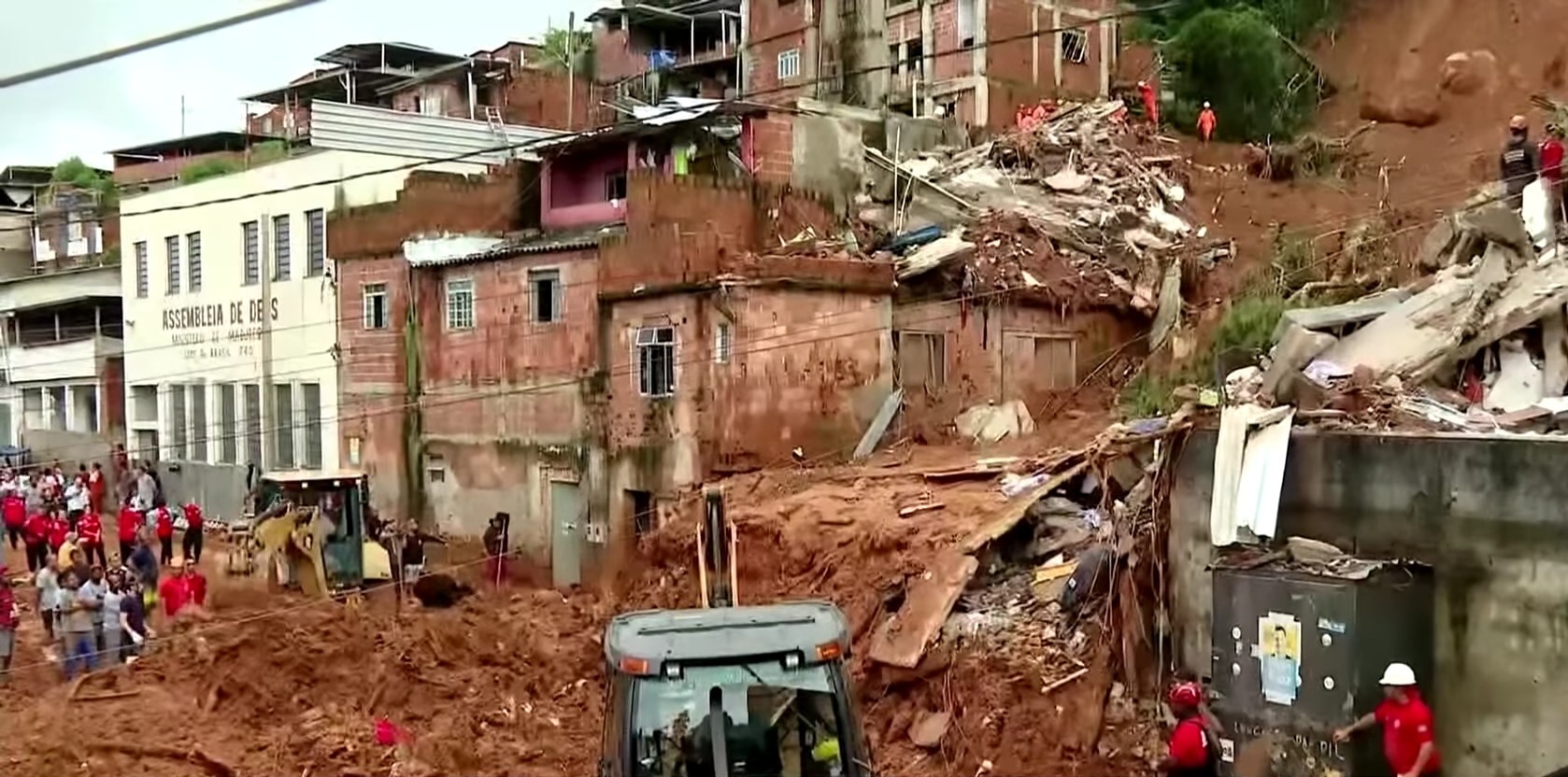
Landslide in Juiz de Fora

The municipalities of Juiz de Fora and Ubá were the most devastated, with a death toll of 22 individuals, and 45 individuals confirmed missing as of noon on the 24th, after severe storms hit the region between late afternoon on the 23rd and early morning on 24 February. However, the area had already recorded above-average rainfall in the previous weeks.

In Juiz de Fora, the Paraibuna River overflowed, as well as several other smaller water bodies. In Ubá, floods hit the campus of the Minas Gerais State University (Universidade do Estado de Minas Gerais, UEMG), destroying books, furniture, and equipment from laboratories and the library. Other municipalities affected were: Matias Barbosa, Senador Firmino, Leopoldina, and Cataguases, where the Pomba River rose from 4.89 meters to 6.05 meters.

About 5,510 residents were displaced as of 27 February: 3,500 in Juiz de Fora, 1,200 in Ubá, and 810 in Matias Barbosa, and a total of 253 people have been rendered homeless. The death toll from the floods had risen to 73 by 17 March, when the last missing body was found. In addition to human losses, landslides and atypical flooding caused by the rain obstructed roads and left neighbourhoods isolated.

== Response ==
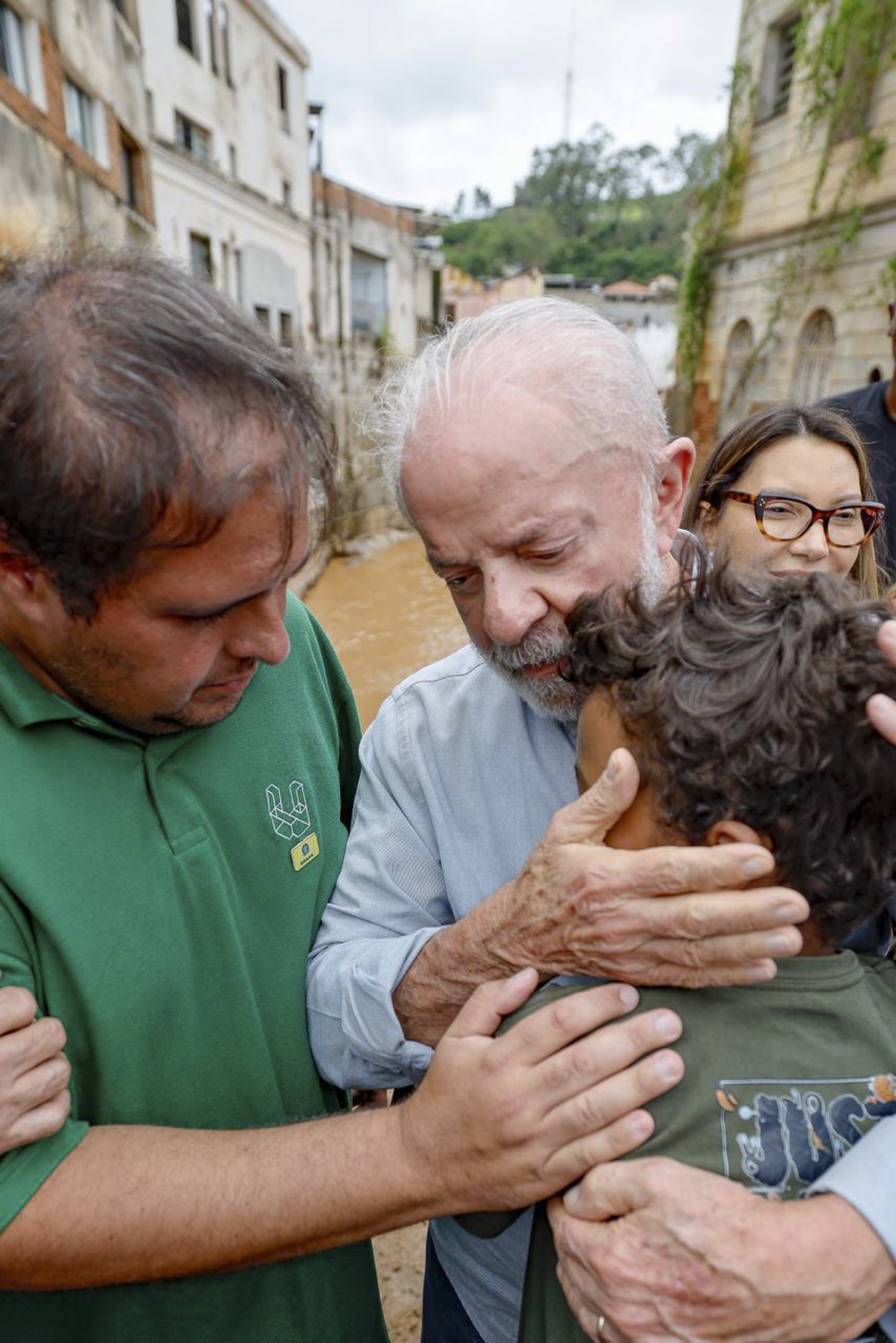
President Luiz Inácio Lula da Silva with mayor of Ubá José Damato Neto in an area affected by the disaster in Ubá on February 28.

The federal government announced financial aid for the affected population and municipalities, and the deployment of the National Force of the Unified Health System (Sistema Único de Saúde, SUS) to the affected areas. President Luiz Inácio Lula da Silva said on his social media that security forces have been deployed on rescue missions and provided immediate assistance.

Minas Gerais governor Romeu Zema visited the region, and declared three days of official mourning for the fatalities. Classes were suspended in schools, and public transport services had to be reduced due to blocked roads. On 26 February, 15 schools were being used as shelters for the homeless and displaced in Juiz de Fora and donation collection points for those affected were provided.

== See also ==
- 2025 Vale do Aço floods
