= Floripes Dornellas de Jesus =

Brazilian Servant of God

Servant of God Floripes Dornellas de Jesus
- Born: 9 June 1913; Mercês, Minas Gerais, Brazil
- Died: 9 April 1999 (aged 85); Rio Pomba

Floripes Dornellas de Jesus (9 June 1913 – 9 April 1999) was a Brazilian Roman Catholic mystic. She is now a Servant of God.

== Life ==
Born in the city of Mercês, she moved with her family to Rio Pomba around the age of four. Her childhood and adolescence was marked by the common activities of country life, until, in the 1930s, a fall from a jabuticabeira tree caused her to become paraplegic. Since then, in the midst of severe pain, she had gradually begun to reduce her diet. Then, evident alterations were noticed in her body, since she no longer felt hunger or tiredness. For 64 years she is said to have only eaten the Holy Communion.

In the first years in which the phenomenon was observed, thousands of people came to its site, in search of prayers and requests for miracles, even awakening the attention of the press. Until the then Archbishop of Mariana, Don Helvécio Gomes de Oliveira, in 1958, asked her to stop the pilgrimages and leave herself to a more withdrawn life, since her health seemed too weak. She was totally averse to the dissemination of her own person, striving to spread only devotion to the Sacred Heart of Jesus, inspired by the movement of the apostolate of prayer. The work of creating the "Male Prayer Apostolate", which in the city of Rio Pomba, reached the number of 1000 followers, was especially highlighted. Her main request was to make the First Fridays Devotion, dedicated to the Heart of Jesus.

== Beatification process ==
Floripes Dornellas de Jesus was declared a Servant of God after the Dicastery for the Causes of Saints issued the nihil obstat ("nothing against") in November 2005. Her home, known as Sítio de Lola, is a place of pilgrimage.
