= Sericita =

Brazilian municipality located in the state of Minas Gerais

Coordinates: 20°29′S 42°29′W

- Municipality
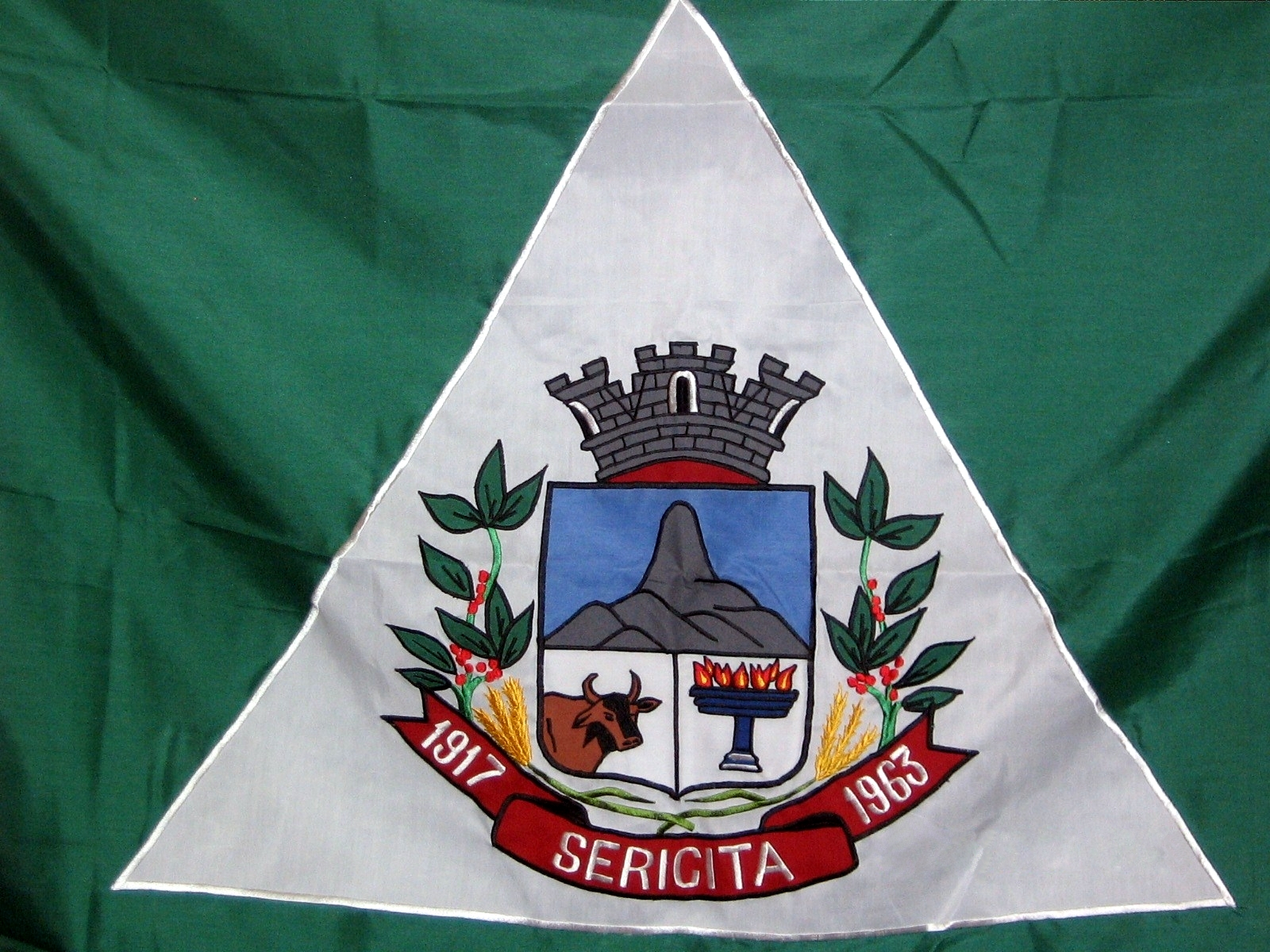
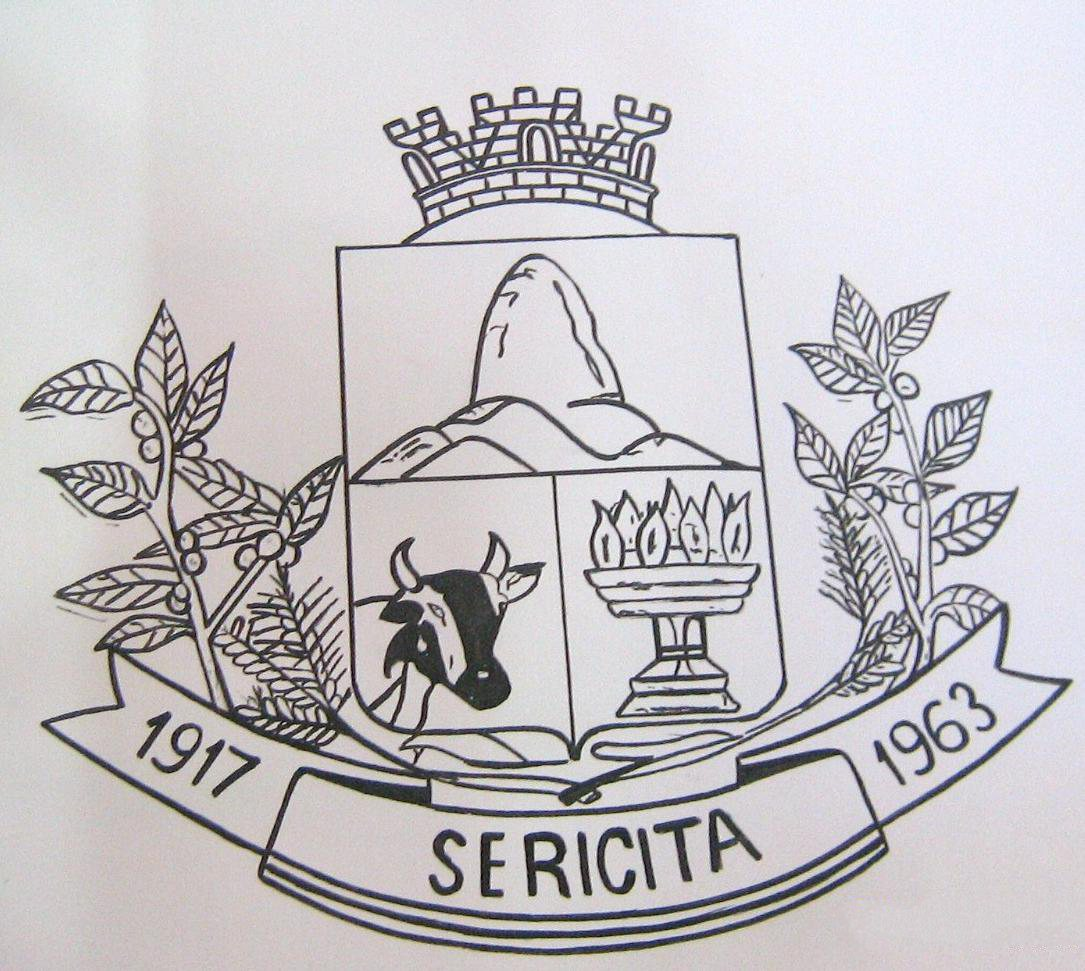
- Flag Coat of arms
- Interactive map of Sericita
- Country: Brazil
- State: Minas Gerais
- Region: Southeast
- Time zone: UTC−3 (BRT)

Location of Sericita within Minas Gerais

Sericita is a Brazilian municipality located in the state of Minas Gerais. The city belongs to the mesoregion of Zona da Mata and to the microregion of Ponte Nova. As of 2020, the estimated population was 7,333.

== See also ==
- List of municipalities in Minas Gerais
