= Douglas Mendes (footballer, born 2004) =

Brazilian footballer

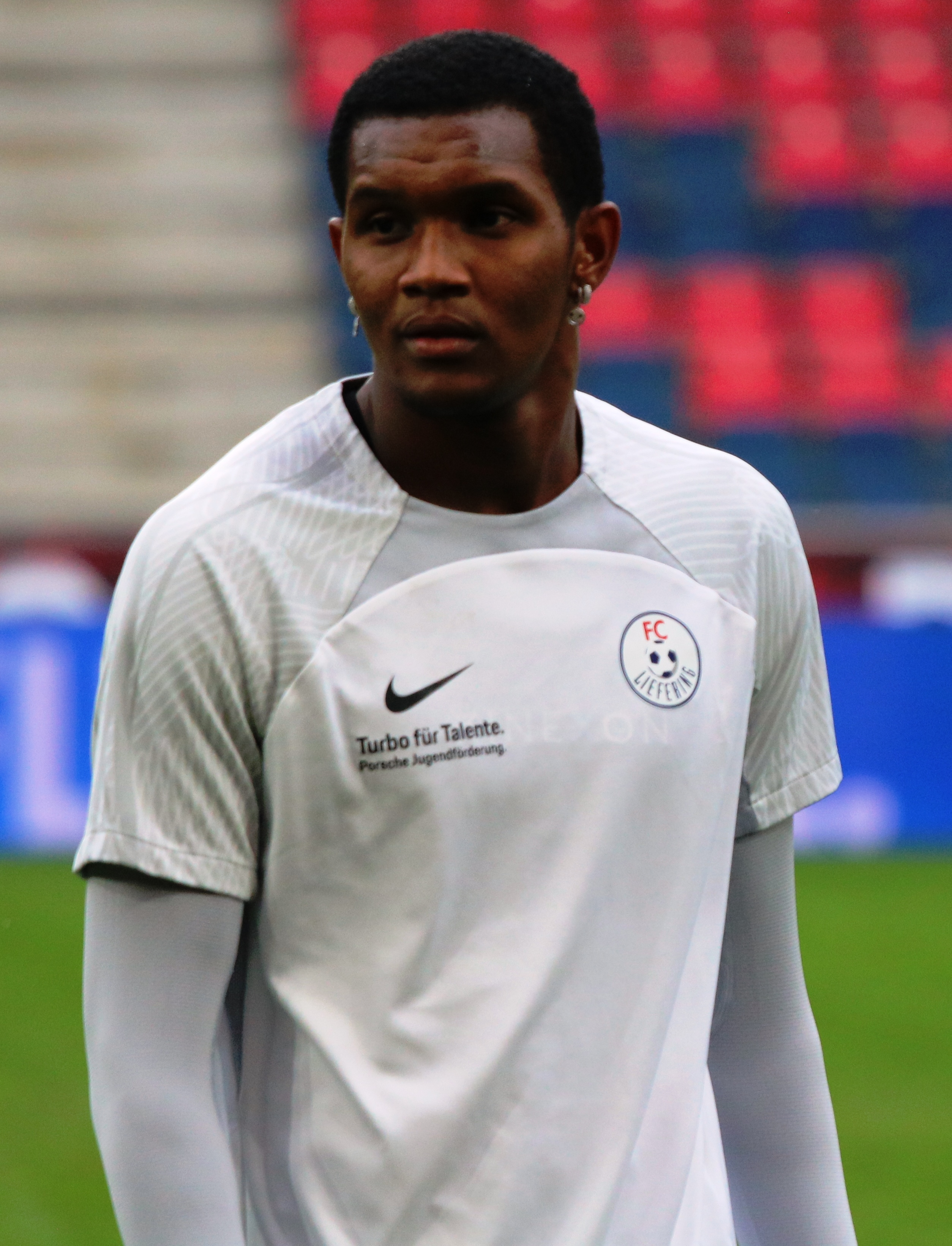

Personal information
- Full name: Douglas Mendes Moreira
- Date of birth: 13 June 2004 (age 22)
- Place of birth: Tocantins, Brazil
- Height: 1.89 m (6 ft 2 in)
- Position: Centre-back

Team information
- Current team: Vila Nova
- Number: 4

Youth career
- 2019–2022: Ponte Preta

Senior career*
Years	Team	Apps	(Gls)
2021–2022	Ponte Preta	9	(0)
2022–2023	Red Bull Bragantino	1	(0)
2023	→ FC Liefering (loan)	3	(0)
2023–2026	Red Bull Salzburg	1	(0)
2023	FC Liefering	7	(0)
2024–2025	→ Red Bull Bragantino (loan)	25	(2)
2025–2026	→ FC Liefering (loan)	8	(0)
2026–	Vila Nova	0	(0)

International career
2023	Brazil U20	12	(0)
Medal record
Men's football
Representing Brazil
South American U-20 Championship
Winner	2023 Colombia
- * Club domestic league appearances and goals as of 17 May 2026

Douglas Mendes Moreira (born 13 June 2004) is a Brazilian professional footballer who plays as a centre-back for Vila Nova.

== Club career ==
Born in Tocantins, Minas Gerais, Douglas Mendes joined Ponte Preta's youth sides as an under-15. He made his first team debut on 26 November 2021, coming on as a second-half substitute for Gustavo Cipriano in a 3–2 Série B home win over Coritiba.

Douglas Mendes became a starter for Ponte during the 2022 Série B, but moved to Série A side Red Bull Bragantino on 5 August 2022, signing a five-year contract. He made his debut in the top tier on 9 November, starting in a 6–0 away loss against Fortaleza.

On 14 February 2023, Douglas Mendes was loaned to FC Liefering until June. On 1 July, Bragantino confirmed his transfer to Red Bull Salzburg; he remained assigned to Liefering.

On 10 January 2024, Mendes returned to Red Bull Bragantino on loan until the end of the year. On 3 January 2025, the loan was extended until the end of 2025.

On 5 July 2026, Mendes returned to Brazil and signed with Vila Nova.

== Career statistics ==
As of match played 12 December 2025

Appearances and goals by club, season and competition
Club	Season	League			State league (Note: Includes Campeonato Paulista)		National cup (Note: Includes Copa do Brasil)		Continental		Other		Total	
Club	Season	Division	Apps	Goals	Apps	Goals	Apps	Goals	Apps	Goals	Apps	Goals	Apps	Goals
Ponte Preta	2021	Série B	1	0	0	0	—		—		—		1	0
Ponte Preta	2022	Série B	8	0	0	0	0	0	—		—		8	0
Ponte Preta	Total		9	0	0	0	0	0	—		—		9	0
Red Bull Bragantino	2022	Série A	1	0	—		—		—		—		1	0
FC Liefering (loan)	2022–23	2. Liga	3	0	—		—		—		—		3	0
FC Liefering	2023–24	2. Liga	7	0	—		—		—		—		7	0
Red Bull Bragantino (loan)	2024	Série A	20	2	5	0	2	0	5 (Note: Appearances in Copa Sudamericana)	0	—		32	2
Red Bull Salzburg	2024–25	Austrian Bundesliga	0	0	—		0	0	0	0	0	0	0	0
Red Bull Salzburg	2025–26	Austrian Bundesliga	1	0	—		0	0	0	0	—		1	0
Red Bull Salzburg	Total		1	0	—		0	0	0	0	0	0	1	0
Liefering (loan)	2025–26	2. Liga	8	0	—		—		—		—		8	0
Career total			49	2	5	0	2	0	5	0	0	0	61	2

== Honours ==
Brazil U20

- South American U-20 Championship: 2023
