= Rodeiro, Minas Gerais =

Municipality in Minas Gerais, Brazil

Coordinates: 21°12′S 42°52′W

- Municipality
- Interactive map of Rodeiro, Minas Gerais
- Country: Brazil
- State: Minas Gerais
- Region: Southeast
- Time zone: UTC−3 (BRT)

Location of Rodeiro within Minas Gerais

Rodeiro is a Brazilian municipality located in the state of Minas Gerais. The city belongs to the mesoregion of Zona da Mata and to the microregion of Ubá. As of 2020, the estimated population was 8,224.

== See also ==
- List of municipalities in Minas Gerais
