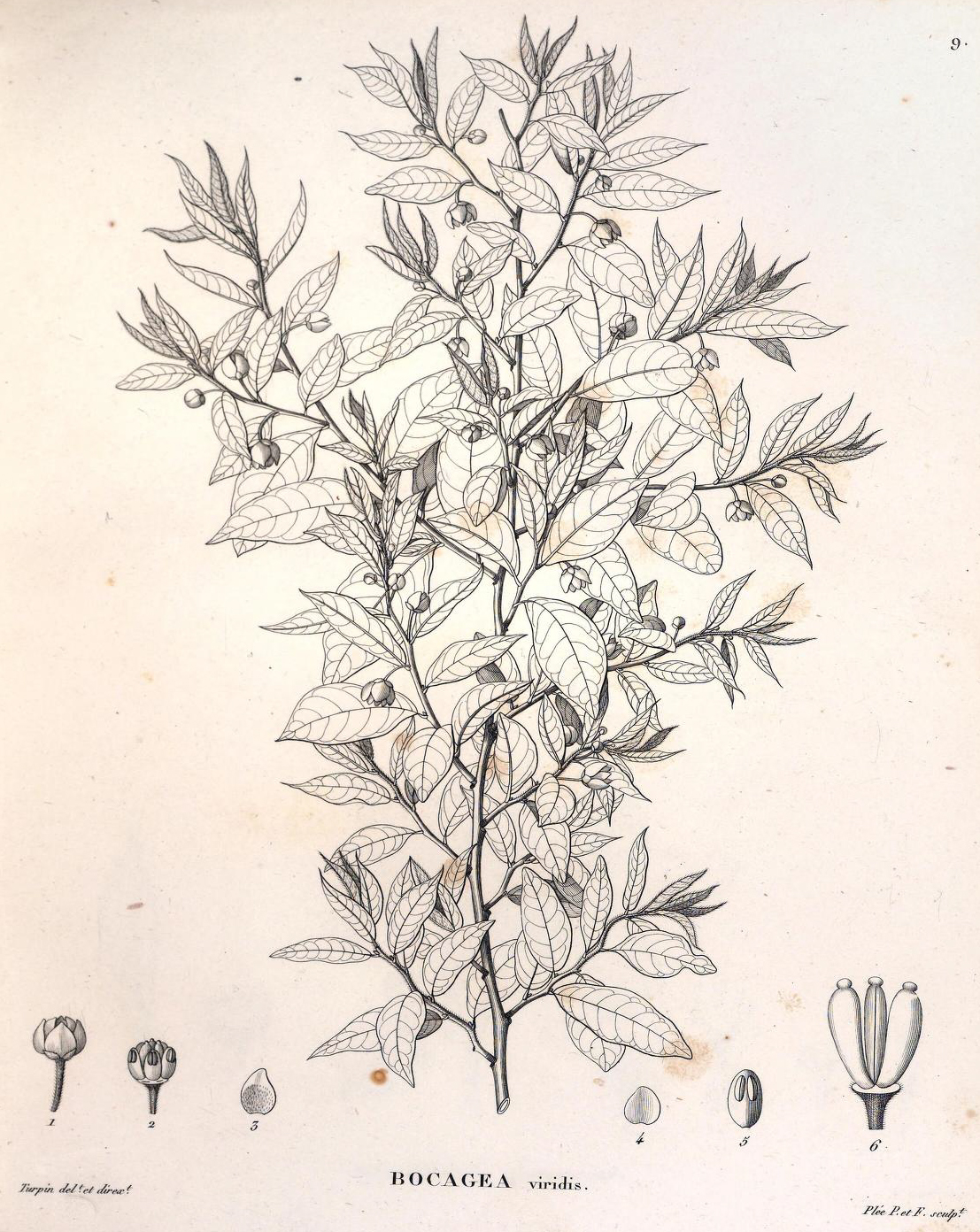
- Botanical illustration of Bocagea viridis

Conservation status
- Endangered (IUCN 3.1)

Scientific classification
- Kingdom: Plantae
- Clade: Embryophytes
- Clade: Tracheophytes
- Clade: Spermatophytes
- Clade: Angiosperms
- Clade: Magnoliids
- Order: Magnoliales
- Family: Annonaceae
- Genus: Bocagea
- Species: B. viridis

Binomial name
- Bocagea viridis A.St.-Hil.

= Bocagea viridis =

Species of plant

Bocagea viridis is a species of flowering plant in the family Annonaceae. It is a shrub or tree native to southeastern Brazil. Augustin Saint-Hilaire, the French botanist who first formally described the species, named it after its green (viridis in Latin) flowers.

== Description ==
It is a bush reaching 5 meters in height. Its black to brown, young branches are covered in soft downy hairs. Its wrinkled, gray mature branches are hairless. Its oval to oblong, papery leaves are 4.1–8.5 by 1.4–3.8 centimeters. The leaves have a pointed base and their tips come to a tapering point. The leaves lack hair on the upper surface but are hairy on their underside. The leaves have 9–12 secondary veins emanating from either side of their midribs. The secondary veins curve toward the leaf apex at an angle of 60–70° and their ends join to form loops. Its petioles are 1.8–2.6 millimeters long, covered in soft downy hairs, and have a channel on their upper surface. Its 4.5 millimeter long, solitary flowers are on peduncles that are 6.8–9 millimeters long and lack bracteoles. The flowers have 3 triangle-shaped sepals that are 0.8–1 by 0.9–1.1 millimeters, covered with hairs on their outer surface, and come to point at their tips. Its flowers have two rows of white to green, leathery petals. The oval external petals are 3.9 by 2.4 millimeters, concave, covered in sparse fine hairs, and come to a tapering point at their tips. The broader, more rounded, inner petals are 3.9 by 2.9 millimeters and come to a tapering point at their tip. Its flowers’ receptacles are 1.2 millimeters in diameter. Its flowers have 1–3 carpels. Its ovaries are 1.5–2.3 by 0.8–1.2 millimeters, covered in dense fine hairs, have a single chamber, convex backs, and flat faces. Each ovary has 7–8 ovules arranged in two rows. Its cone-shaped, broad stamens are 2.4 by 1.6 millimeters, concave on the back, and convex on their face. The stamen filaments are indistinct. Its smooth, rounded stigma lack a stalk. Its hairless, warty, oval fruit are 6–6.8 millimeters long.

=== Distribution and habitat ===
Saint-Hilaire observed in the forest of the Brazilian municipality Ubá. It has also been collected from Minas Gerais and a plantation in Vitória, Espírito Santo.

=== Reproductive biology ===
The pollen of B. viridis is shed as permanent tetrads.
