= Natal Dunes State Park =

State park in Rio Grande do Norte, Brazil

Natal Dunes State Park: Journalist Luiz Maria Alves
- Parque Estadual das Dunas de Natal Jornalista Luiz Maria Alves
- IUCN category II (national park)
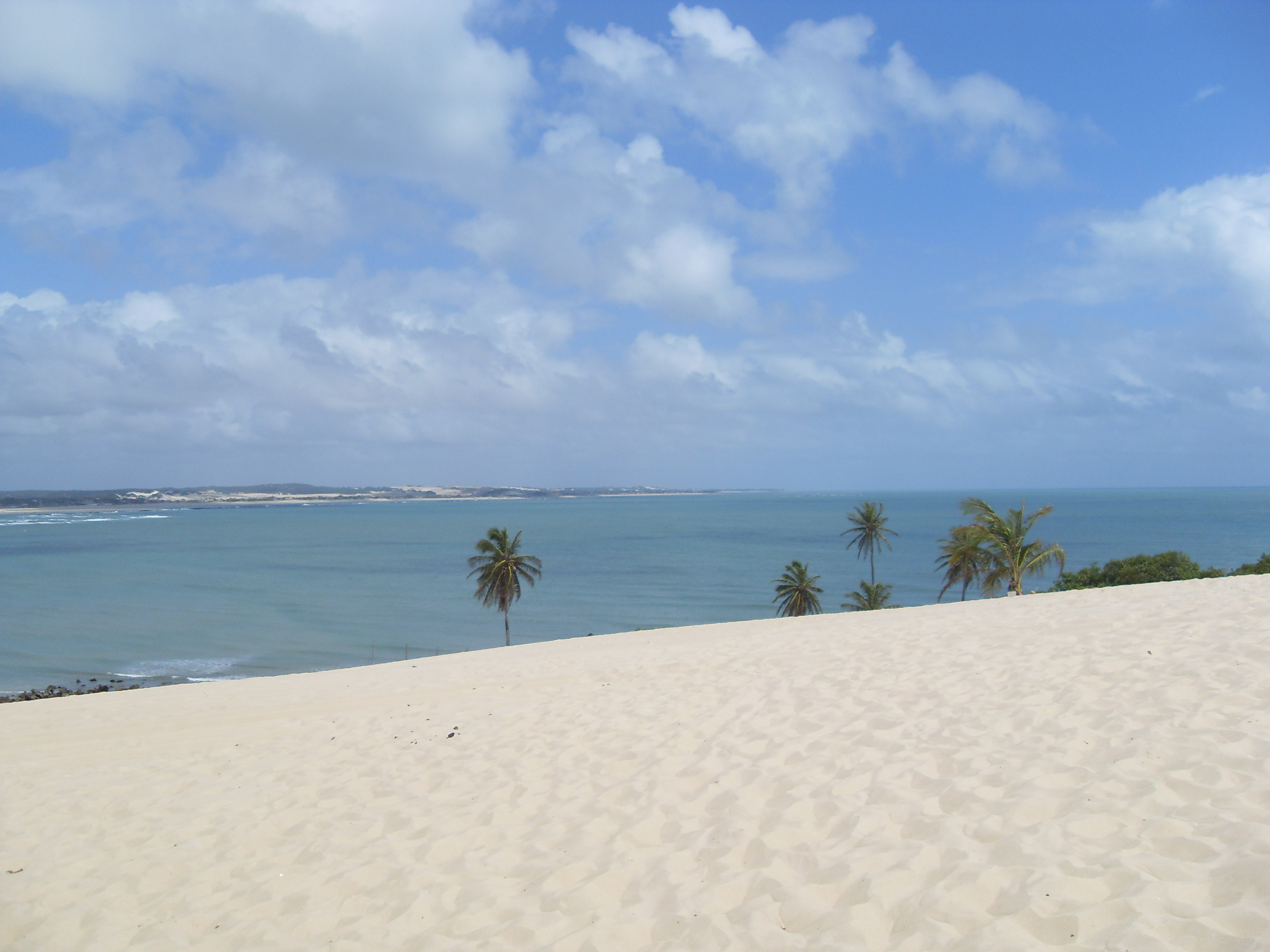

- Location within Brazil
- Nearest city: Natal, Rio Grande do Norte
- Coordinates: 5°49′12″S 35°11′16″W
- Area: 1,172 ha (4.53 sq mi)
- Designation: State park
- Created: 22 November 1977
- Administrator: IDEMA: Instituto de Desenvolvimento Sustentável e Meio Ambiente do Rio Grande do Norte

The Natal Dunes State Park "Journalist Luiz Maria Alves" (Portuguese: Parque Estadual das Dunas de Natal "Jornalista Luiz Maria Alves"), or simply the Dunes Park (Portuguese: Parque das Dunas) is a state park in the state of Rio Grande do Norte in the Northeast Region of Brazil. It protects an area of dunes and native vegetation along the coastal highway.

== Location ==
The Natal Dunes State Park is considered the second largest urban park in Brazil. It protects an area of Atlantic Forest and dunes in the heart of the city of Natal, capital of Rio Grande do Norte. The park has an area of 1,172 hectares (2,900 acres) extending along the coastal highway beside the neighborhoods of Mãe Luiza, Capim Macio and Ponta Negra.

== History ==
The Dunes Park was created by state decree 7,237 of 22 November 1977. It was the first environmental conservation unit in Rio Grande do Norte. The objective is to preserve the natural ecosystems and sites of historical, archaeological and landscape value, protect genetic resources, support research and support leisure, ecotourism, education and ecological awareness. The park has a Management Plan and an Operation Plan that covers environmental management programs, public use and operations. The park has been recognized by UNESCO as an integral part of the Atlantic Forest Biosphere Reserve. In 2006 the park benefited from an extensive overhaul of the facilities.

== Environment ==
The vegetation is mainly coastal dune herbs, shrubs and trees, mainly Atlantic Forest but with some species of the caatinga and tabuleiro. There are over 270 species of trees in 78 families. Fauna includes over 180 species of mammals, reptiles, birds, and invertebrates such as butterflies, spiders and scorpions.

== Activities ==
On average there are 150,000 visitors annually. The public use area, the Bosque dos Namorados, covers about 7 hectares (17 acres) and has over 1,300 native Atlantic Forest trees. It contains the park headquarters, visitor center, library, research center, seedling nursery for native species, Brazil wood amphitheater, arts area, artificial lake, environmental control station, playground and track for jogging and hiking. The visitor center holds a permanent exhibition on the park.

Three interpretive trails totaling 6.5 kilometres (4.0 mi) describe elements of the dune ecosystem. The park is managed by IDEMA. The park stages concerts, plays, lectures, exhibitions and workshops. The administration maintains a nursery of native seedlings with a capacity of 16,000 seedlings used for recovery and reforestation. The park managers conduct environmental education programs in the communities that surround the park.

== Sources ==
- "Parque das Dunas (Dunas Park)", Brazil Natal
- Parque das Dunas (in Portuguese), IDEMA
