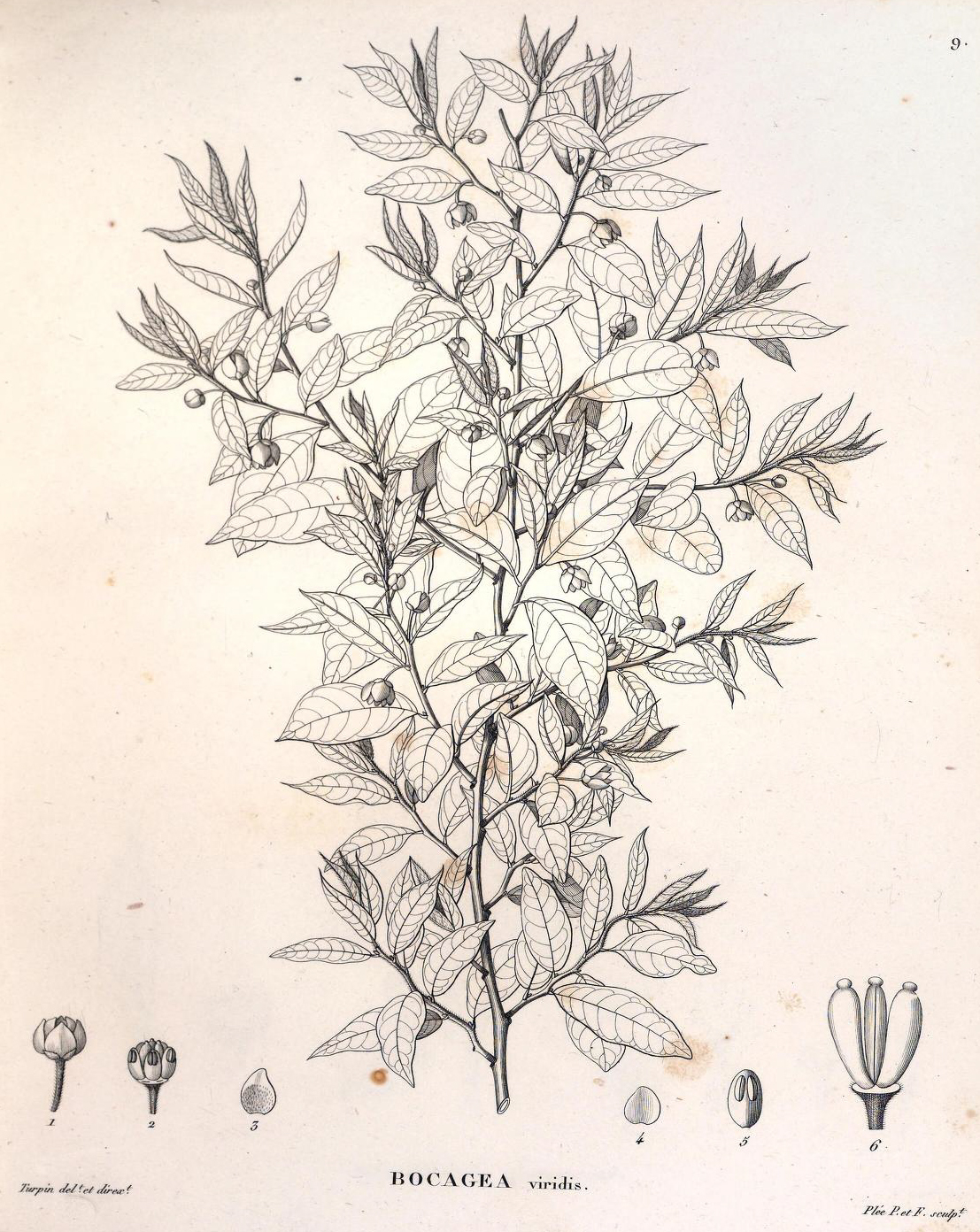
- Black and white botanical illustration of Bocagea viridis showing a branch with leaves and flowers, as well as floral parts.

Scientific classification
- Kingdom: Plantae
- Clade: Tracheophytes
- Clade: Angiosperms
- Clade: Magnoliids
- Order: Magnoliales
- Family: Annonaceae
- Genus: Bocagea; A.St.-Hil.

Species
- 4, see text.

= Bocagea =

Genus of plants

Bocagea is a genus of plants in the family Annonaceae. It comprises four species distributed in Brazil. Augustin Saint-Hilaire, the French botanist who first formally described the genus, named it after Josephi Mariae de Souza du Bocage, who he said beautifully translated a poem about flowers into Portuguese and illustrated it.

All species of Bocagea are rare and are at least endangered.

== Description ==
Bocagea are shrubs or small trees with two rows of petals, 3 interior and 3 exterior, and 6 stamens.

== Species ==
There are currently four described species in Bocagea:

- Bocagea asymmetrica Mello-Silva & J.C.Lopes
- Bocagea longepedunculata Mart.
- Bocagea moeniana Mello-Silva & J.C.Lopes
- Bocagea viridis A.St.-Hil.
