= Dores do Turvo =

Brazilian municipality located in the state of Minas Gerais

Coordinates: 20°58′S 43°11′W

- Municipality
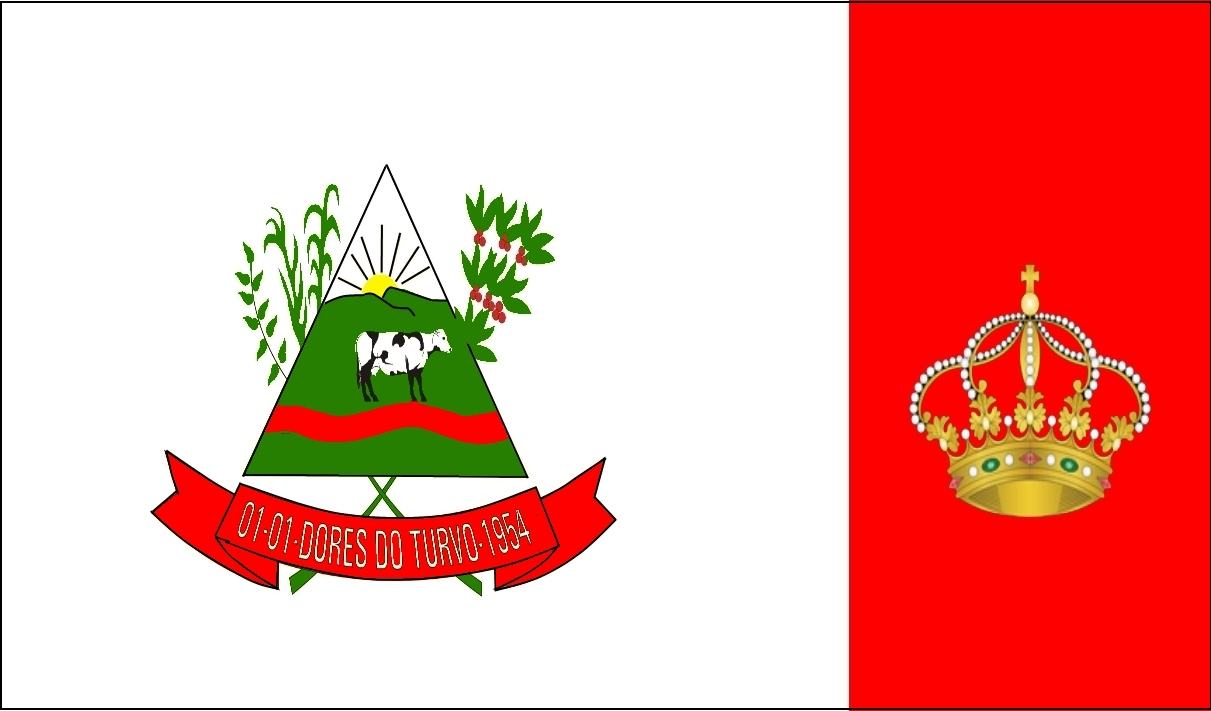
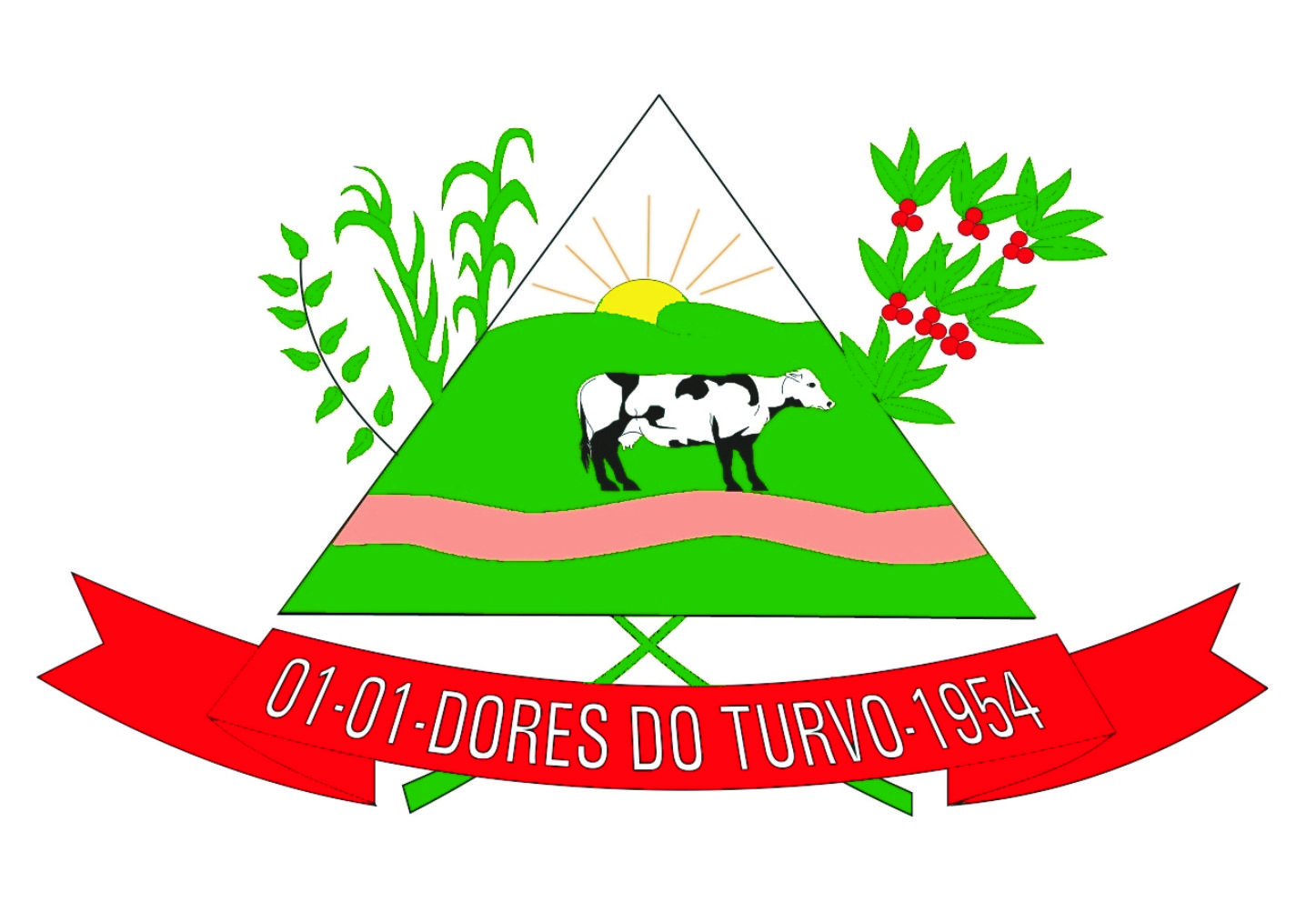
- Flag Coat of arms
- Interactive map of Dores do Turvo
- Country: Brazil
- State: Minas Gerais
- Region: Southeast
- Time zone: UTC−3 (BRT)

Location of Dores do Turvo within Minas Gerais

Dores do Turvo is a Brazilian municipality located in the state of Minas Gerais. The city belongs to the mesoregion of Zona da Mata and to the microregion of Ubá. As of 2020, the estimated population was 4,230.

== See also ==
- List of municipalities in Minas Gerais
