= Guarani, Minas Gerais =

Guarani
- Municipality
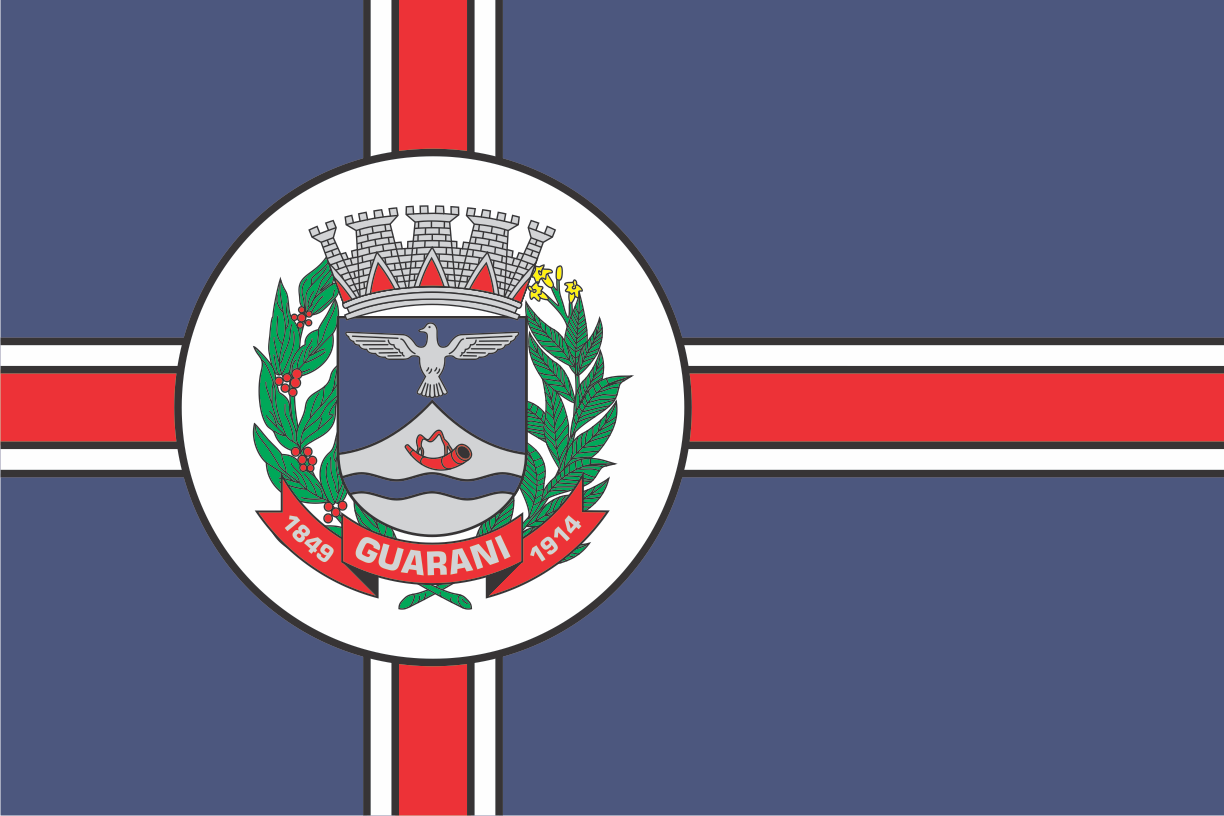
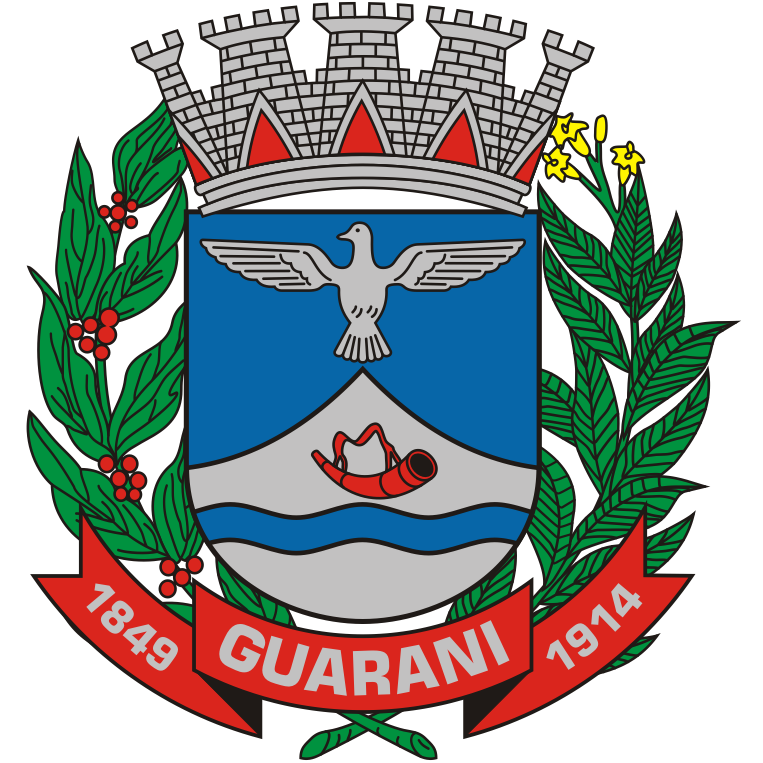
- Flag Coat of arms

- Location in Minas Gerais state

- Location in Brazil
- Coordinates: 21°21′7″S 43°2′49″W
- Country: Brazil
- Region: Southeast
- State: Minas Gerais

Area
  - Total: 264 km^{2} (102 sq mi)

Population (2020)
  - Total: 8,918
  - Density: 33.8/km^{2} (87.5/sq mi)
- Time zone: UTC−3 (BRT)

Guarani is a municipality located in the Zona da Mata within the state of Minas Gerais, Brazil. The population is 8,918 (2020 est.) in an area of 264 km^{2}. The average elevation is 440m above the sea level within the urban limits, reaching up to 1,434m in the mountainous area located in the outskirts. The town was named after the biggest native tribe which dwelt in Brazil before the Colonial Period, the Guaranis.

Guarani's most iconic landscape is the Catholic Parish of the Divine Holy Ghost located in one of the highest points of the town. Surrounded by a small green garden and Marechal Deodoro da Fonseca Square and gathered with astonishing paintings as well as sculptures representing New Testament's passages the church is an attractive building which reminds the baroque churches of older cities, spread throughout Minas Gerais state, settled in the seventeenth century. However, the area of Guarani was only settled in the 1830s, and it became a municipality on March 25, 1914, by separation from Pomba.

== See also ==
- List of municipalities in Minas Gerais
