= Brás Pires =

Brazilian municipality located in the state of Minas Gerais

Coordinates: 20°51′S 43°15′W

- Municipality
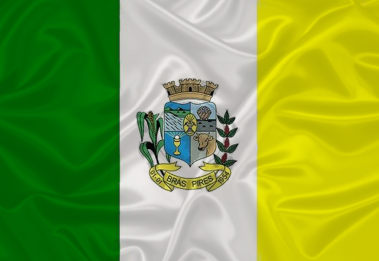
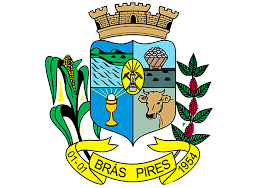
- Flag Coat of arms
- Interactive map of Brás Pires
- Country: Brazil
- State: Minas Gerais
- Region: Southeast
- Time zone: UTC−3 (BRT)

Location of Brás Pires within Minas Gerais

Brás Pires is a Brazilian municipality located in the state of Minas Gerais. The city belongs to the mesoregion of Zona da Mata and to the microregion of Viçosa. As of 2020, the estimated population was 4,293.

== See also ==
- List of municipalities in Minas Gerais
