= Bocagea longepedunculata =

Conservation status
- Least Concern (IUCN 3.1)

Scientific classification
- Kingdom: Plantae
- Clade: Embryophytes
- Clade: Tracheophytes
- Clade: Spermatophytes
- Clade: Angiosperms
- Clade: Magnoliids
- Order: Magnoliales
- Family: Annonaceae
- Genus: Bocagea
- Species: B. longepedunculata

Binomial name
- Bocagea longepedunculata Mart.

Species of flowering plant

Bocagea longepedunculata is a species of flowering plant in the family Annonaceae. It is a tree native to eastern Brazil. Carl Friedrich Philipp von Martius, the German botanist and explorer who first formally described the species, named it after its long (longus in Latin) floral stalks (pedunculus in Latin).

== Description ==
It is a small tree with erect, spreading branches. Its branches have dark bark. Its oval to oblong leaves are 8.1–10.8 by 2.7–4.1 cm (3.2–4.3 by 1.1–1.6 in) and come to a point at their tips. Its long thin peduncles are 4–5.4 cm (1.6–2.1 in) and lack bracteoles. Its flowers have two rows of petals. The green, oblong, exterior petals are 6.8 mm (0.27 in) long and come to a shallow point at their tip. The inner petals are oval. Its styles are short. Its stigmas have angular heads. Its ovaries are covered in shiny straight hairs.

=== Reproductive biology ===
The pollen of B. longipedunculata is shed as permanent tetrads.

== Habitat and distribution ==
Carl von Martius reported it as growing in Porto Seguro. It ranges from southeastern Bahia to eastern Minas Gerais. It has been observed growing in rainforest habitats.
