= Tocantins, Minas Gerais =

Brazilian municipality located in the state of Minas Gerais

Coordinates: 21°10′30″S 43°01′04″W

- Municipality
- Interactive map of Tocantins, Minas Gerais
- Country: Brazil
- State: Minas Gerais
- Region: Southeast
- Time zone: UTC−3 (BRT)

Location of Tocantins within Minas Gerais

Tocantins is a Brazilian municipality located in the state of Minas Gerais. The city belongs to the mesoregion of Zona da Mata and to the microregion of Ubá. As of 2020, the estimated population was 16,715.

== See also ==
- List of municipalities in Minas Gerais
