= Guidoval =

- municipality
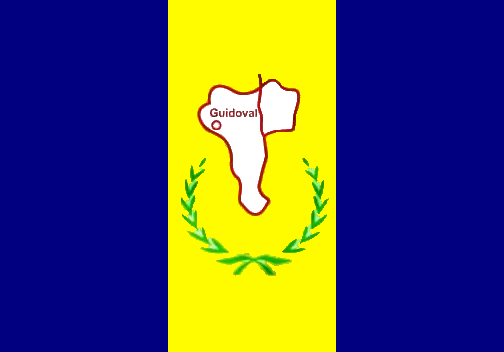
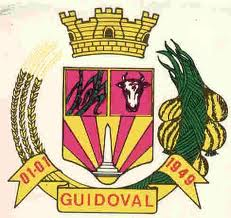
- Flag Coat of arms
- Motto(s): Guidovalense não parte. Reparte! Uma parte, fica. Outra parte, parte!
- Coordinates: 21°09′07″S 42°47′49″W
- Country: Brazil
- State: Minas Gerais
- Mesoregion: Zona da Mata
- Microregion: Ubá
- Established: 1948

Government
  - Mayor: Soraia Vieira de Queiroz de Souza

Area
  - Total: 15,897.5 ha (39,284 acres)

Population (2020)
  - Total: 7,051
- Demonym: guidovalense
- Time zone: UTC−3 (BRT)

Guidoval is a Brazilian municipality located in the state of Minas Gerais. The city belongs to the mesoregion of Zona da Mata and to the microregion of Ubá.

== See also ==
- List of municipalities in Minas Gerais
