= Aracitaba =

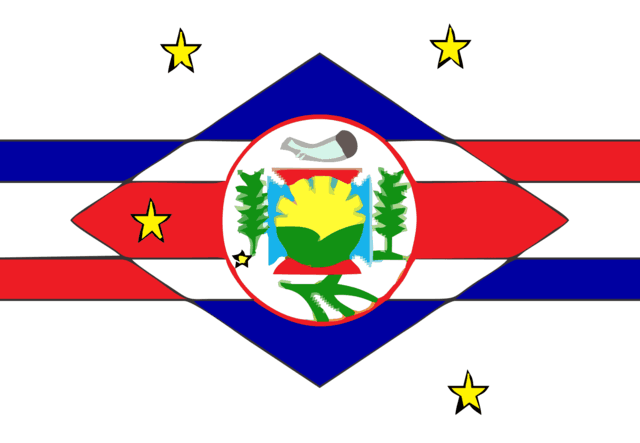
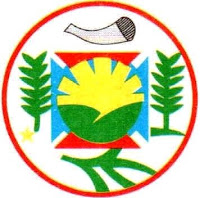
- Flag Coat of arms

- Location in Minas Gerais

- Location in Brazil
- Coordinates: 21°20′34″S 43°22′40″W
- Country: Brazil
- Region: Southeast Region
- State: Minas Gerais
- Mesoregion: Zona da Mata
- Microregion: Juiz de Fora
- Established: December 30, 1962

Government
  - Major: Fábio Alfeu da Silva (MDB)

Area
  - Total: 105.885 km^{2} (40.882 sq mi)

Population (2020)
  - Total: 2,059
  - Density: 19.45/km^{2} (50.36/sq mi)
- Demonym: aracitabense
- Time zone: UTC−3 (BRT)
- CEP postal code: 36255-000
- Area code: 32
- Website: aracitaba.mg.gov.br

Aracitaba is a Brazilian municipality located in the state of Minas Gerais. Its population as of 2020 is estimated to be 2,059 people living in a total area of 105.885 km^{2} (40.882 sq mi). The city belongs to the mesoregion of Zona da Mata and to the microregion of Juiz de Fora.

== See also ==
- List of municipalities in Minas Gerais
