= Guiricema =

Brazilian municipality

Coordinates: 21°00′S 42°43′W

- Municipality
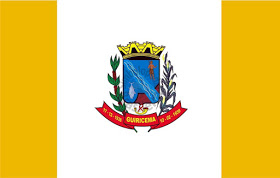
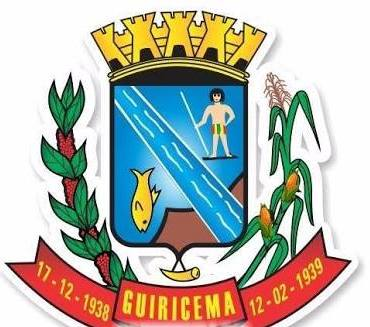
- Flag Coat of arms
- Interactive map of Guiricema
- Country: Brazil
- State: Minas Gerais
- Region: Southeast
- Time zone: UTC−3 (BRT)

Location of Guiricema within Minas Gerais

Guiricema is a Brazilian municipality located in the state of Minas Gerais. The city belongs to the mesoregion of Zona da Mata and to the microregion of Ubá. As of 2020, the estimated population was 8,343.

== See also ==
- List of municipalities in Minas Gerais
