= Senador Firmino =

Brazilian municipality located in the state of Minas Gerais

Coordinates: 20°54′43″S 43°05′49″W

- Municipality
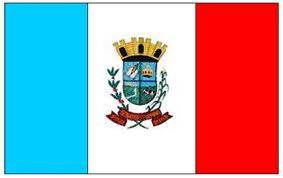
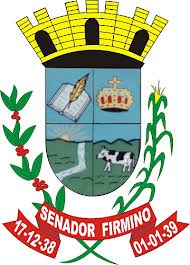
- Flag Coat of arms
- Interactive map of Senador Firmino
- Country: Brazil
- State: Minas Gerais
- Region: Southeast
- Time zone: UTC−3 (BRT)

Location of Senador Firmino within Minas Gerais

Senador Firmino is a Brazilian municipality located in the state of Minas Gerais. The city belongs to the mesoregion of Zona da Mata and to the microregion of Ubá. As of 2020, the estimated population was 7,858.

== See also ==
- List of municipalities in Minas Gerais
