= Tabuleiro =

Municipality in Brazil

Coordinates: 21°21′32″S 43°14′52″W

- Municipality
- Interactive map of Tabuleiro
- Country: Brazil
- State: Minas Gerais
- Region: Southeast
- Time zone: UTC−3 (BRT)

Location of Tabuleiro within Minas Gerais

Tabuleiro is a Brazilian municipality located in the state of Minas Gerais. The city belongs to the mesoregion of Zona da Mata and to the microregion of Ubá. As of 2020, the estimated population was 3,708.

== See also ==
- List of municipalities in Minas Gerais
