= Silveirânia =

Brazilian municipality located in the state of Minas Gerais

Coordinates: 21°10′S 43°12′W

- Municipality
- Interactive map of Silveirânia
- Country: Brazil
- State: Minas Gerais
- Region: Southeast
- Time zone: UTC−3 (BRT)

Location of Silveirânia within Minas Gerais

Silveirânia is a Brazilian municipality located in the state of Minas Gerais. The city belongs to the mesoregion of Zona da Mata and to the microregion of Rio Pomba. As of 2020, the estimated population was 2,264.

== See also ==
- List of municipalities in Minas Gerais
