= Rio Pomba =

- Municipality
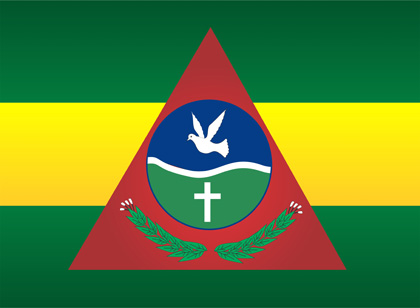
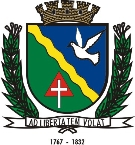
- Flag Coat of arms

- Location in Minas Gerais state

- Location in Brazil
- Coordinates: 21°16′S 43°10′W
- Country: Brazil
- Region: Southeast
- State: Minas Gerais

Area
  - Total: 252 km^{2} (97 sq mi)

Population (2020)
  - Total: 17,959
  - Density: 71.3/km^{2} (185/sq mi)
- Time zone: UTC−3 (BRT)

Rio Pomba is a municipality in the Brazilian state of Minas Gerais founded on 25 December 1767. The population is 17,959 (2020 est.) in an area of 252 km^{2}. The municipality is located at a mean elevation of 441 m.

== History ==
In the 1700s, the region of the Pomba River valley was inhabited by the Coroados and Coropós indigenous peoples. As they came into contact with the colonizers, initially the residents of Guarapiranga (Piranga), they experienced oppression and domination, leading to violent clashes. In 1776, Governor Luís Diogo Lobo da Silva sought a religious solution to the conflict from the Diocese of Mariana. Father Manuel de Jesus Maria offered himself for a "civilizing" mission.

On October 13, 1831, an imperial resolution elevated the settlement of São Manuel do Pomba to a village, which came to encompass the parishes of numerous other localities such as Mercês, São João Nepomuceno do Rio Novo, Santa Rita da Meia Pataca, Bonfim, among others. The current name was adopted in 1948.

== Notable people ==
- Alisson, Football player
- Lysia Condé, Singer

== See also ==
- List of municipalities in Minas Gerais
