= Ubá =

Municipality in Minas Gerais, Brazil

- Municipality
- Municipality of Ubá
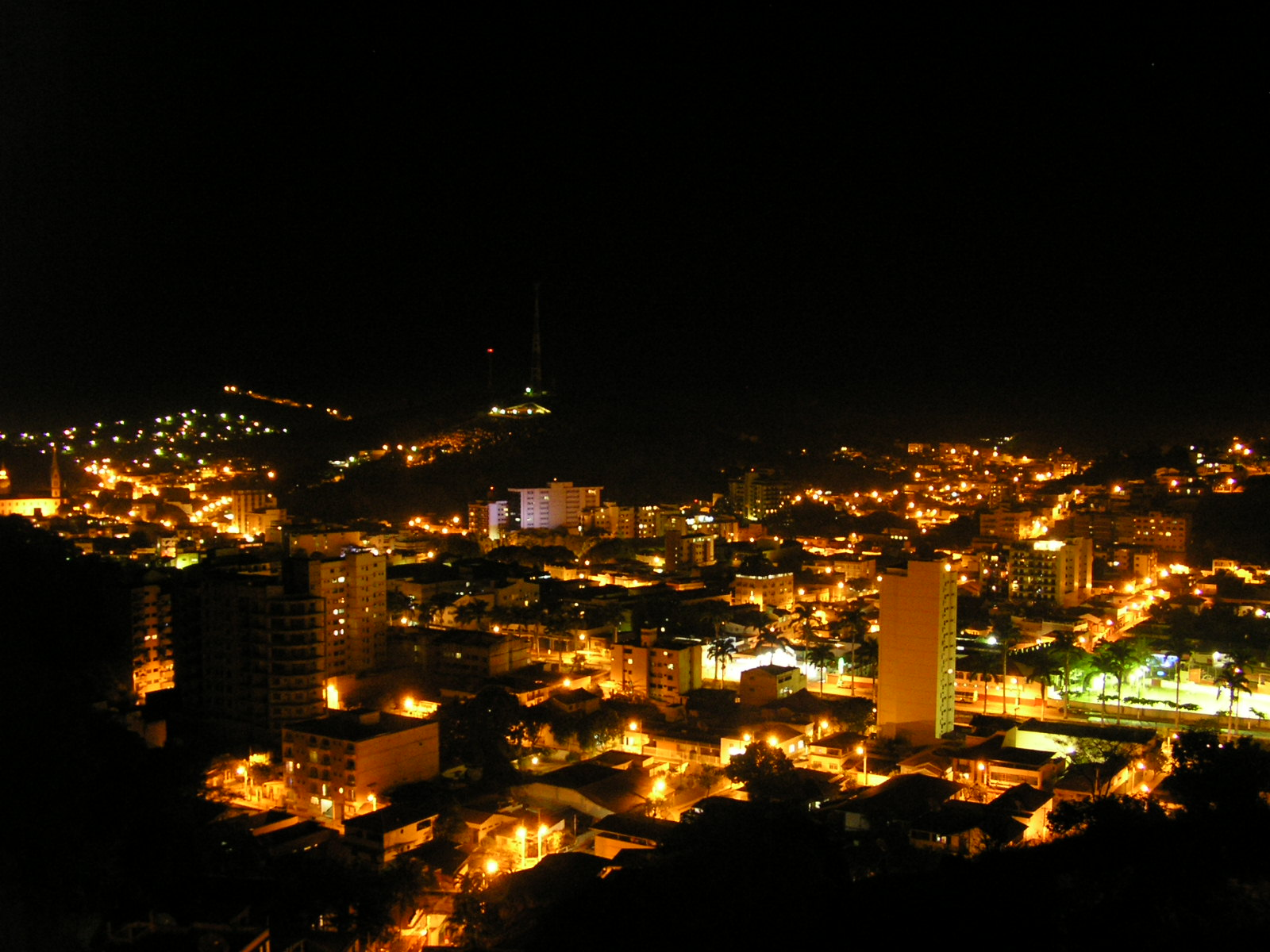
- Night view of Ubá

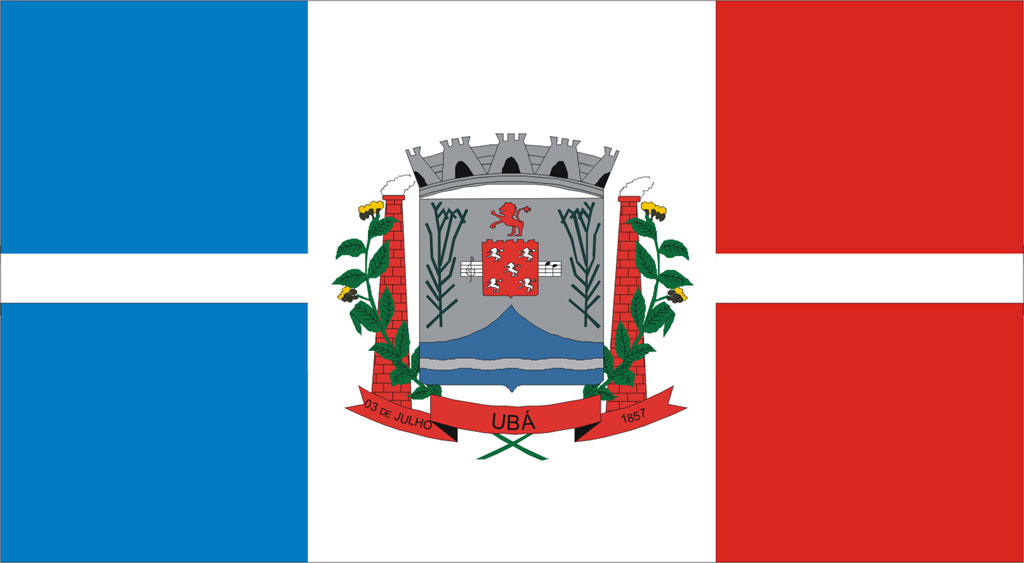
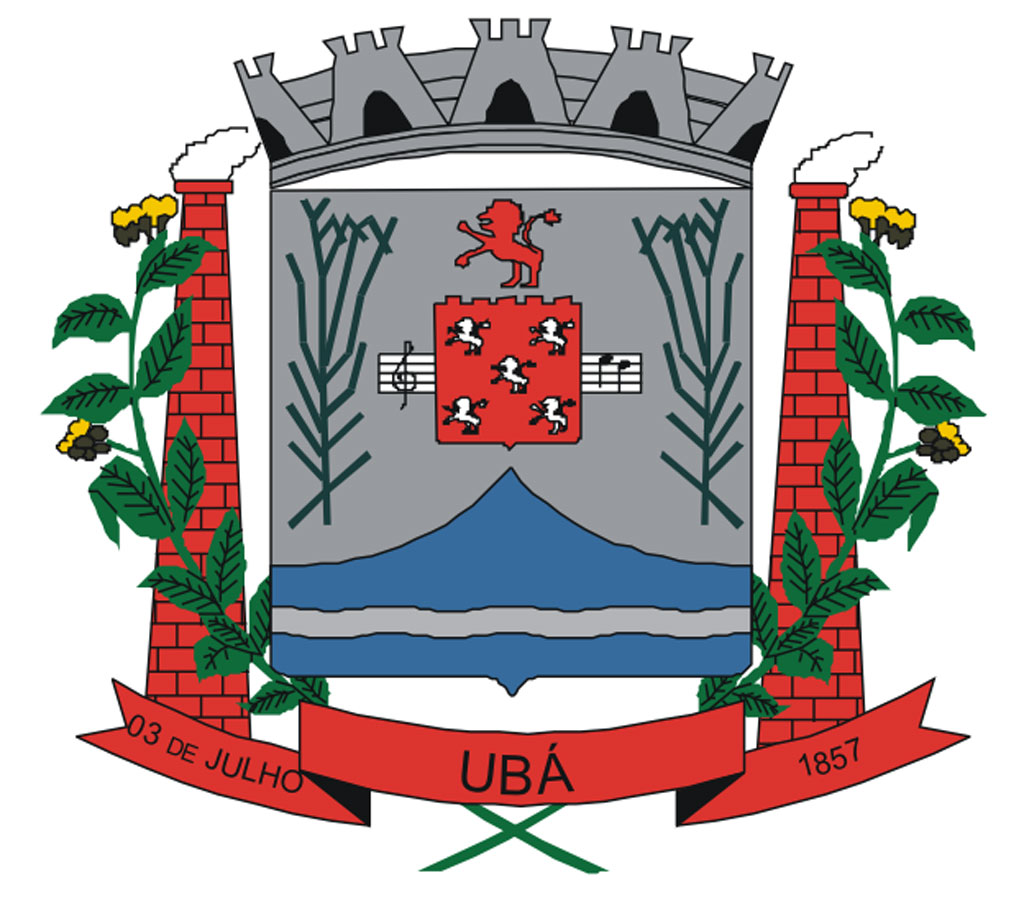
- Flag Coat of arms

- Location in Minas Gerais

- Location in Minas Gerais Location in Brazil
- Coordinates: 21°07′12″S 42°56′34″W
- Country: Brazil
- Region: Southeast
- State: Minas Gerais
- Intermediate region: Juiz de Fora
- Immediate region: Ubá
- Village status: June 17, 1853
- City status: July 3, 1857
- Districts: Ubá (seat), Diamante de Ubá, Miragaia, and Ubarí

Government
  - Mayor: José Damato Neto (PSD)
  - Term: 2025–2028

Area
  - Total: 407.452 km^{2} (157.318 sq mi)
- Elevation: 338 m (1,109 ft)

Population (2022 census)
  - Total: 103,365
  - Estimate (2025): 107,423
  - Density: 253.686/km^{2} (657.045/sq mi)
- Demonym: ubaense
- Time zone: UTC−3 (BRT)
- Postal code: 36500-000 to 36509-999
- Area code: 32
- HDI (2010): 0.724 (high)
- GDP per capita (2023): R$43,169.47
- Website: www.uba.mg.gov.br

Ubá is a municipality in the Zona da Mata region of southeastern Minas Gerais, Brazil. It had a population of 103,365 in the 2022 census, with an estimated population of 107,423 in 2025, in an area of 407.452 km^{2} (157.318 sq mi). It is part of the Immediate Geographic Region of Ubá, within the Intermediate Geographic Region of Juiz de Fora.

Tobacco cultivation shaped Ubá's economy from the 1930s through the 1950s. As the crop declined, furniture manufacturing expanded and became the municipality's principal industrial activity. Ubá is the seat of the state-recognized Furniture Hub of Ubá and Region, which includes municipalities across the surrounding part of the Zona da Mata. The municipality is also closely associated with the 'Ubá' mango cultivar, which is grown throughout the Zona da Mata and used for fresh consumption and the production of juice and fruit pulp.

== History ==
The Pomba River basin settlement took place, initially, due to the decline of mining activities. In the late 18th and early 19th century, several families left Mariana, Ouro Preto, and other mining centers in search of fertile land where they could undertake activities that would result in a more stable and secure incoming. The regions bathed by the Itajaí River, Chopotó River, Pomba River, among others, were of great interest because the land in those areas were of great fertility, and that they were previously inhabited only by natives (Coroados, Coropós and Purís) and adventurers.

The attempts of colonization of Coroados, Coropós, Purís and Botocudos always ended in bloody battles between the indigenous people and the colonizers. During the battles, using arrows and axes against firearms, the natives were gradually slaughtered or made prisoners for slave labor, especially when it comes to young people and women.

Due to the international pressure against the genocide of natives, the King of Portugal was convinced to order the Governor Luís Diogo Lobo da Silva to organize an expedition in an attempt to friendly approach the natives. In November 1767, Father Manoel de Jesus Maria was put in charge for the conversion of the natives to Catholicism, laying the groundwork for the entry of the owners of land grants after 1797. Captain Francisco Pires de Farinho, who was familiar with the tracks of forests and the indigenous customs, and was familiar with them, was named special guide with control power.

Father Jesus Maria arrived at Uba River, where the Coroado natives lived. Those natives used a kind of grass, Gynerium sagittatum (in Portuguese, U-Uva), to make the arrows they used. For linguistic evolution U-Uva became Ubá. Between 1797 and 1798, the first land grants located around the river were donated.

In 1805, Captain Antonio Januário Carneiro and his brother-in-law Commander Jose de Faria Alvim Cesario, acquired several land grants previously belonging to the Municipality of São João Batista do Presídio, bringing their families, slaves and livestock. In this period, according to an agreement between the Vatican and the Catholic Monarchs, when a settlement in the colonies was founded, a church was to be the first building to be built. While the former owners of land were concerned about their farms, Antonio Januário Carneiro idealized establish a settlement. His first step was to lead a movement to sign the petition requesting the permit for the construction of the church. On November 3, 1815, the request was granted.

To promote this settlement, Captain Januário Carneiro brought all the workers needed to build the church by giving them small pieces of land, housing and food, while they could not have its own supply by cultivating the land. The chapel received the name of St. Januarius, and the village the name of Capela de São Januário de Ubá (Chapel of St. Januarius of Ubá).

Due to the growth of the village, it was elevated to Paróquia de São Januário de Ubá (Parish of St. Januarius of Ubá) on April 7, 1841. The development of the town took place gradually around the parish. Due to the development of the parish and the activities of the inhabitants, especially coffee plantations, the settlement was officially recognized as a village on June 17, 1853, and on July 3, 1857, was incorporated as a municipality.

The first city council was composed by:

- Colonel Francisco de Assis Ataíde
- Pedro de Souza Ozório
- Maximiano José Pereira de Souza
- Joaquim Vieira da Silva Pinto
- Manoel de Oliveira da Silva Brandão
- Diogo da Rocha Bastos

== Geography ==
Ubá lies in the Zona da Mata region and forms the center of the Immediate Geographic Region of Ubá. Most of the city lies in the Paraíba do Sul River basin, with a small part of it lying in the Doce River basin. The city is not surrounded by any large river. Ubá River crosses the city from northwest to southeast and is responsible for drainage of most sewers in the city.

The city sits in a valley and has only 5% of its area flat, the rest being rugged. The altitude ranges from 295 meters to 875 meters.

=== Climate ===
Ubá's climate can be classified as Tropical, with yearly average temperature between 18 and 31 °C (64 and 88 °F). The city is considered the warmest one in the Zona da Mata mesoregion, and the temperatures can reach over 40 °C (104 °F) between November and February.

Climate data for Ubá
Month	Jan	Feb	Mar	Apr	May	Jun	Jul	Aug	Sep	Oct	Nov	Dec	Year
Mean daily maximum °C (°F)	32 (90)	32 (90)	32 (90)	29 (84)	28 (82)	26 (79)	27 (81)	28 (82)	29 (84)	29 (84)	30 (86)	31 (88)	29 (85)
Daily mean °C (°F)	26 (79)	26 (79)	26 (79)	23 (73)	21 (70)	19 (66)	19 (66)	21 (70)	22 (72)	24 (75)	22 (72)	23 (73)	23 (73)
Mean daily minimum °C (°F)	22 (72)	22 (72)	21 (70)	19 (66)	16 (61)	14 (57)	14 (57)	15 (59)	17 (63)	19 (66)	21 (70)	21 (70)	18 (65)
Average precipitation mm (inches)	241 (9.5)	181 (7.1)	177 (7.0)	56 (2.2)	30 (1.2)	10 (0.4)	23 (0.9)	15 (0.6)	48 (1.9)	99 (3.9)	198 (7.8)	203 (8.0)	1,281 (50.5)
Source: The Weather Channel

== Notable people ==
- Ary Barroso, composer and radio man
- Eugênio German, the first Brazilian international chess master
- Evandro Soldati, fashion model
- Mauro Mendonça, actor.
- Nelson Ned, singer.

== See also ==
- List of municipalities in Minas Gerais
