= Zona da Mata (Minas Gerais) =

Mesoregion in Southeast Brazil

Mesoregion of Zona da Mata
- Mesoregion
- Location of the Mesoregion of Zona da Mata
- Coordinates: 21°07′12″S 42°56′34″W
- Country: Brazil
- Region: Southeast
- State: Minas Gerais

Area
  - Total: 35,747.729 km^{2} (13,802.275 sq mi)

Population (2010/IBGE)
  - Total: 2,175,254
  - Density: 53.38/km^{2} (138.3/sq mi)
- Time zone: UTC-3 (BRT)
  - Summer (DST): UTC-2 (BRST)
- Area code: +55 32

Zona da Mata is a mesoregion of the state of Minas Gerais, Brazil, situated in the southeastern part of the state, along the border of the states of Minas Gerais, Rio de Janeiro and Espírito Santo. The region is notably hilly, with altitude varying from 100 meters to 1,900 meters. The most significant river in the region is the Paraíba do Sul.

Because of its geography it produces one of the best coffees of the region; coming first in 2007 in the annual Brazilian Quality Coffee for Espresso Awards (run by the Italian coffee company Illy).

Zona da Mata was the richest region of Minas Gerais from the 1850s to the 1930s due to coffee and milk production. Today – along with farming – textile, furniture, siderurgy and automotive industries are important to the economy of the region. Some important roads cross the region, like the BR-116, BR-040 and BR-267.

The mesoregion is composed of the following microregions.

- Cataguases
- Juiz de Fora
- Manhuaçu
- Muriaé
- Ponte Nova
- Ubá
- Viçosa

The most important and populous city of the region is Juiz de Fora with 500,000 inhabitants, roughly 25% of the Zona da Mata's population. Other important cities are:

- Além Paraíba
- Carangola
- Cataguases
- Leopoldina
- Manhuaçu
- Muriaé
- Ponte Nova
- Santos Dumont
- Ubá
- Viçosa
- Visconde do Rio Branco

== Bibliography ==
"The Forbidden Lands: Colonial Identity, Frontier Violence, and the Persistence of Brazil's Eastern Indians, 1750–1830". Harold Langfur. Stanford: Stanford University Press, 2006. Paperback, 2009.

== See also ==
- 2026 Zona da Mata floods, floods and landslides that occurred in February 2026
