= Diocese of São João del Rei =

Latin Catholic diocese in Brazil

Diocese of São João del Rei Dioecesis Sancti Ioannis a Rege

Catholic
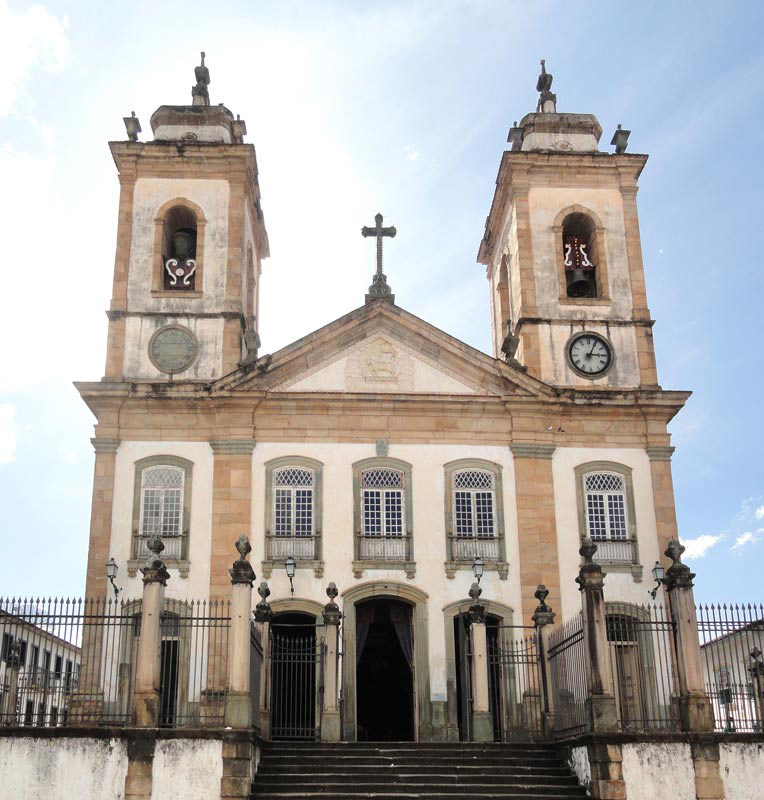
- Cathedral-Basilica of Our Lady of the Pillar

Location
- Country: Brazil
- Ecclesiastical province: Juiz de Fora

Statistics
- Area: 9,503 km^{2} (3,669 sq mi)
- Population: Total; Catholics: (as of 2004); 520,000; 468,000 (90.0%)

Information
- Denomination: Catholic Church
- Sui iuris church: Latin Church
- Rite: Roman Rite
- Established: 21 May 1960 (66 years ago)
- Cathedral: Catedral Basílica Nossa Sehora do Pilar

Current leadership
- Pope: Leo XIV
- Bishop: José Eudes Campos do Nascimento
- Metropolitan Archbishop: Gil Antônio Moreira
- Bishops emeritus: Waldemar Chaves de Araújo

The Diocese of São João del Rei (Latin: Dioecesis Sancti Ioannis a Rege) is a Latin Church ecclesiastical jurisdiction or diocese of the Catholic Church in Brazil. It is a suffragan in the ecclesiastical province of the metropolitan Archdiocese of Juiz de Fora.

Its cathedral is the Cathedral Basilica of Our Lady of the Pillar, São João del Rei, a minor basilica, dedicated to Our Lady of the Pillar, in the city of São João del-Rei.

== History ==
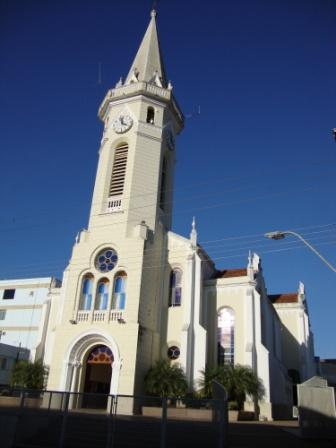
Saint Anne in Lavras.

On May 21, 1960, the Diocese of São João del-Rei was established as Dioecesis Sancti Ioannis a Rege (Latin), on territories split off from the Diocese of Campanha, Archdiocese of Mariana, and (then) Diocese of Juiz de Fora.

== Statistics ==
As of 2015, its pastoral services reached 506,000 Catholics (85.1% of the total population, 594 800), on 9 503 km², and 40 parishes.

=== Religious persons ===
- 72 priests: 48 diocesan, 24 religious;
- 2 deacons;
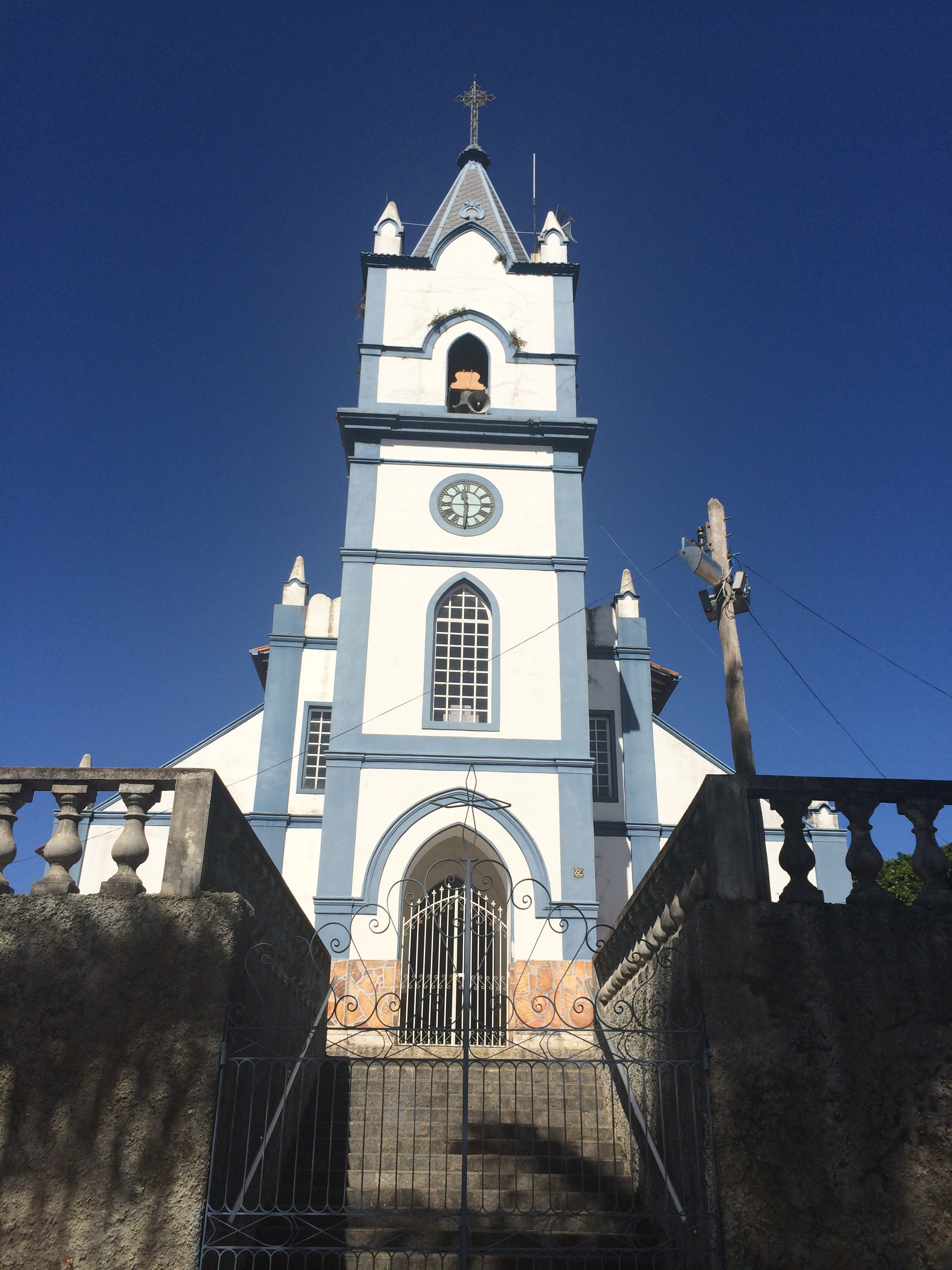
- Saint Gundisalvus of Amarante in Ibituruna.
  109 lay religious: 57 brothers, 52 sisters;
- 9 seminarians.

== Ordinaries ==
- Delfim Ribeiro Guedes (1960-07-23 – retired 1983-12-07), died 1985; previously Bishop of Leopoldina (Brazil) (1943-06-26 – 1960-07-23)
- Antônio Carlos Mesquita (1983-12-16 – 1996-06-26), died 2005; previously Titular Bishop of Tamada (1974-04-08 – 1977-03-06) as Coadjutor Bishop of Oliveira (Brazil) (1974-04-08 – 1977-03-06) and Apostolic Administrator sede plena of Oliveira (Brazil) (1974-04-08 – 1977-03-06), succeeding as Bishop of Oliveira (Brazil) (1977-03-06 – 1983-12-16)
- Waldemar Chaves de Araújo (1996-06-26 – retired 2010.05.26), previously Bishop of Teófilo Otoni (Brazil) (1989-11-18 – 1996-06-26)
- Célio de Oliveira Goulart, Order of Friars Minor (O.F.M.) (2010-05-26 – death 2018-01-19), previously Bishop of Leopoldina (Brazil) (1998-06-24 – 2003-07-09), Bishop of Cachoeiro de Itapemirim (Brazil) (2003-07-09 – 2010-05-26)
- José Eudes Campos do Nascimento (2018-12-12 - present).

== Personalities ==
- Nhá Chica (1808-1895), lay woman
- José Maria Xavier (1819-1887), priest, composer of sacred music
- Antônio de Almeida Lustosa (1886-1974), Archbishop of Fortaleza
- Miguel Afonso de Andrade Leite (1912-1976), priest
- Lucas Moreira Neves (1925-2002), cardinal
- Benigna Victima de Jesus (1907-1981), nun who lived in Lavras
- Martin de Porres Ward (1918-1999), African American missionary

== Sources and External links ==
- GCatholic.org, with Google map - data for all sections
- Catholic Hierarchy
- Diocese website (Portuguese)
