= Célio de Oliveira Goulart =

Brazilian Catholic bishop (1944–2018)

Célio de Oliveira Goulart O.F.M.
- Bishop of São João del Rei
- Church: Catholic Church
- Diocese: Diocese of São João del Rei
- In office: 26 May 2010 – 19 January 2018
- Predecessor: Waldemar Chaves de Araújo
- Successor: José Eudes Campos do Nascimento
- Previous posts: Bishop of Cachoeiro de Itapemirim (2003-2010); Diocese of Leopoldina (1998-2003)

Orders
- Ordination: 12 July 1969
- Consecration: 28 August 1998 by Paulo Lopes de Faria

Personal details
- Born: 14 September 1944 Piracema, Minas Gerais, United States of Brazil
- Died: 19 January 2018 (aged 73) São João del-Rei, Minas Gerais, Brazil

Célio de Oliveira Goulart, OFM (Piracema, Minas Gerais, Brazil, 14 September 1944 – São João del-Rei, Minas Gerais, 19 January 2018) was a Roman Catholic bishop of the dioceses of Leopoldina, Cachoeiro de Itapemirim and São João del-Rei, Brazil.
