= Reesink =

Reesink is a Dutch surname. Notable people with the surname include:

- Diogo Reesink (1934–2019), Brazilian-Dutch Roman Catholic bishop
- Ger Reesink, Dutch linguist
- Jaap Reesink (born 1946), Dutch rower
