= Miguel Afonso de Andrade Leite =

Brazilian Catholic priest (1912–1976)

The Reverend Miguel Afonso de Andrade Leite
- Diocese: Diocese of São João del Rei

Orders
- Ordination: 13 February 1938

Personal details
- Born: September 29, 1912 São João del-Rei, Minas Gerais, Brazil
- Died: September 30, 1976 (aged 64) São João del-Rei, Minas Gerais, Brazil
- Buried: São Miguel Church, São João del-Rei, Minas Gerais
- Denomination: Roman Catholic

Miguel Afonso de Andrade Leite (29 September 1912 – 30 September 1976), better known as "Padre Miguel do Cajuru", was a Brazilian Roman Catholic priest.

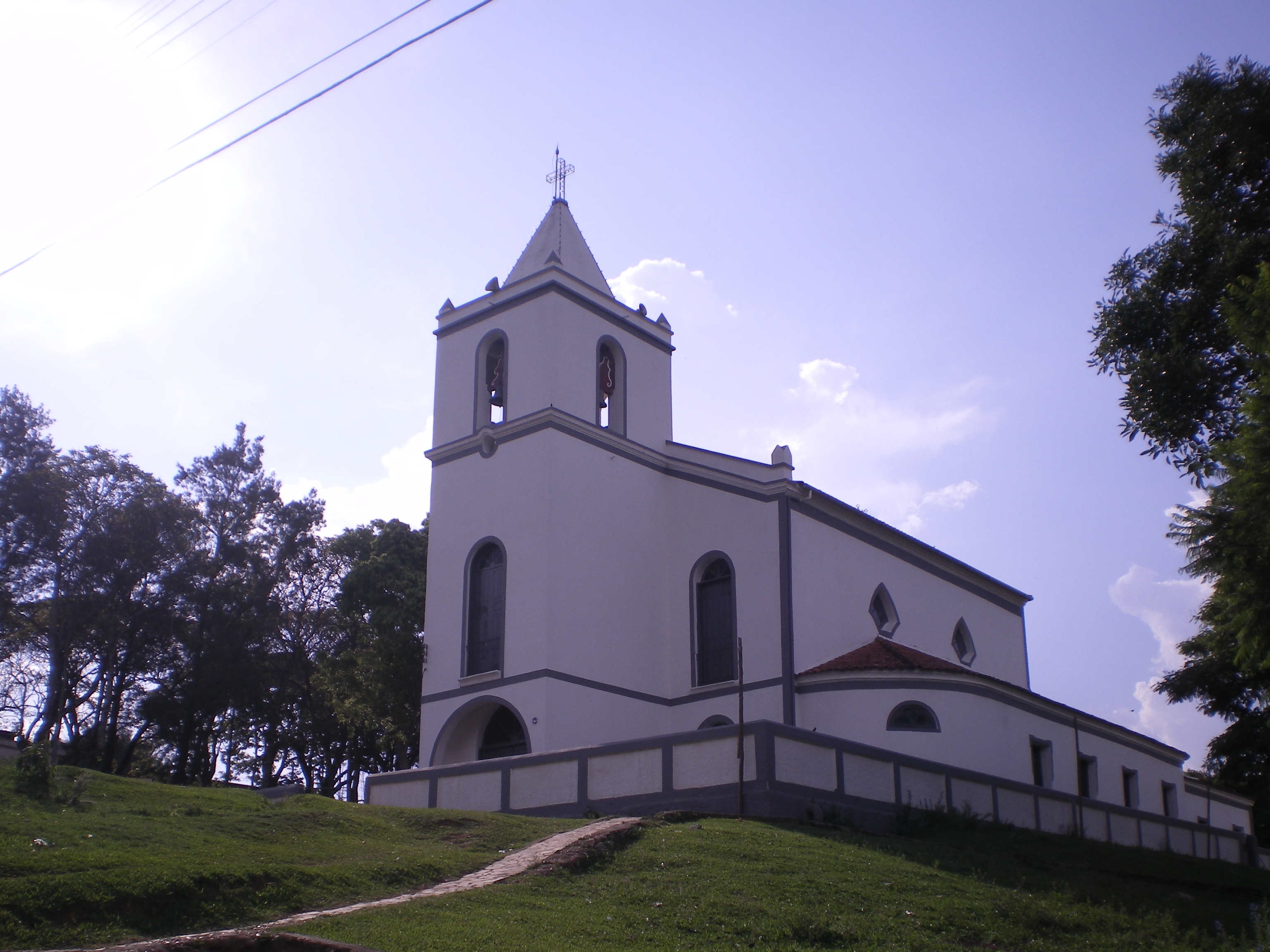
Church of São Miguel Arcanjo, place of his main activity

He was the son of Francisco Afonso de Andrade Leite and Afonsina Batista de Carvalho. He celebrated his first sung Mass on February 22, 1938, in the rural district of São Miguel do Cajuru, near Madre de Deus de Minas.

He was regarded as prodigious in good works.

He died on September 30, 1976, the day after his 64th birthday, at the Santa Casa da Misericórdia of São João del-Rei. At the wake, the priest's fragile body almost stripped naked in the urn, as the faithful tried to cut off his cassock and take home the little flaps, which turned into miraculous relics. The body was buried inside the Mother Church of São Miguel.

In September 2019, a group of Catholics in the district signed the request for beatification to the diocesan bishop of São João del-Rei, José Eudes Campos do Nascimento.

== Biographical book ==
In September 2021, a biographical book was released, with a preface by the priest from Paraiba, and YouTuber, Gabriel Vila Verde, and presentation by the historian Ana Lígia Lira, who wrote a book about the Cimbres Marian apparition (in the Northeast state of Pernambuco), in 1936.
