= Diocese of Almenara =

Catholic ecclesiastical territory

Coordinates: 16.1831°S 40.6948°W

Diocese of Almenara Dioecesis Almenarensis Diocese de Almenara
- Cathedral of St John the Baptist in Almenara

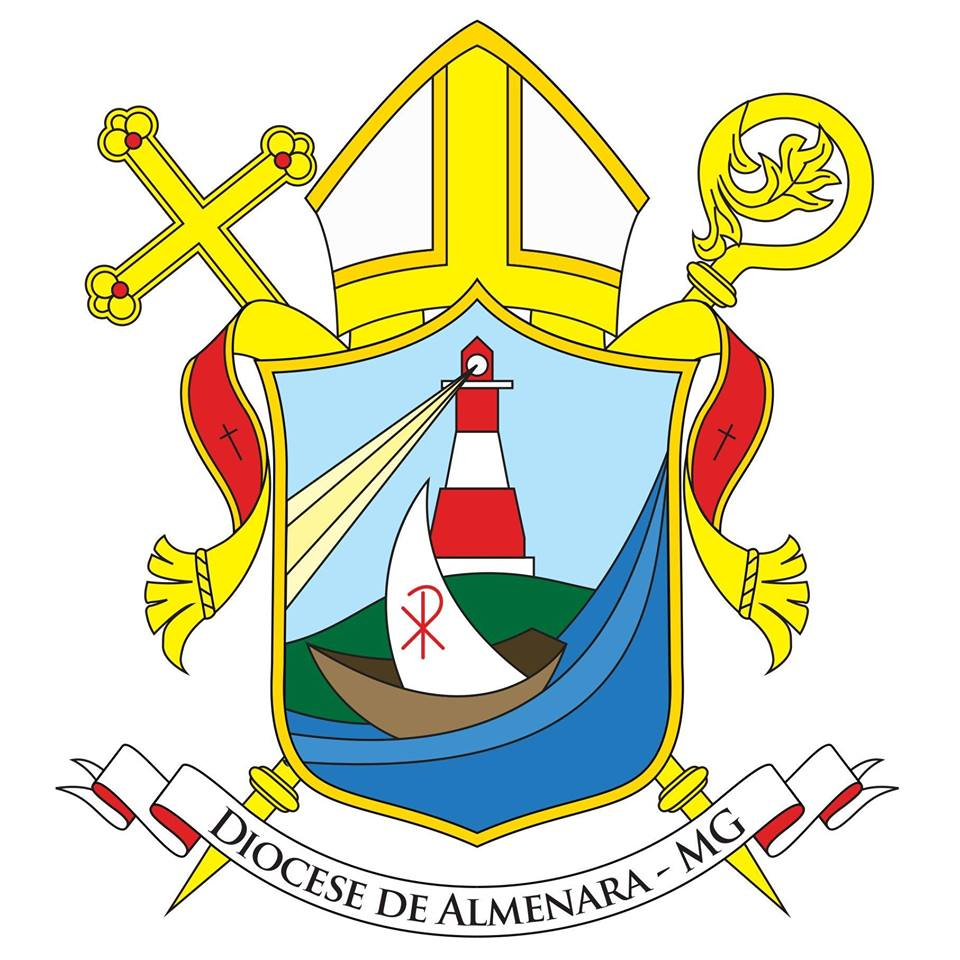
- Coat of arms

Location
- Country: Brazil
- Ecclesiastical province: Diamantina
- Metropolitan: Diamantina

Statistics
- Area: 15,738 km^{2} (6,076 sq mi)
- Population: Total; Catholics: (as of 2004); 192,800; 147,300 (76.4%)

Information
- Rite: Latin Rite
- Established: 28 March 1981 (45 years ago)
- Cathedral: Cathedral of St John the Baptist in Almenara

Current leadership
- Pope: Leo XIV
- Bishop: José Hamilton de Castro
- Metropolitan Archbishop: Darci José Nicioli
- Bishops emeritus: Hugo María Van Steekelenburg Bishop Emeritus

Website
- https://www.diocesedealmenara.ogr.br

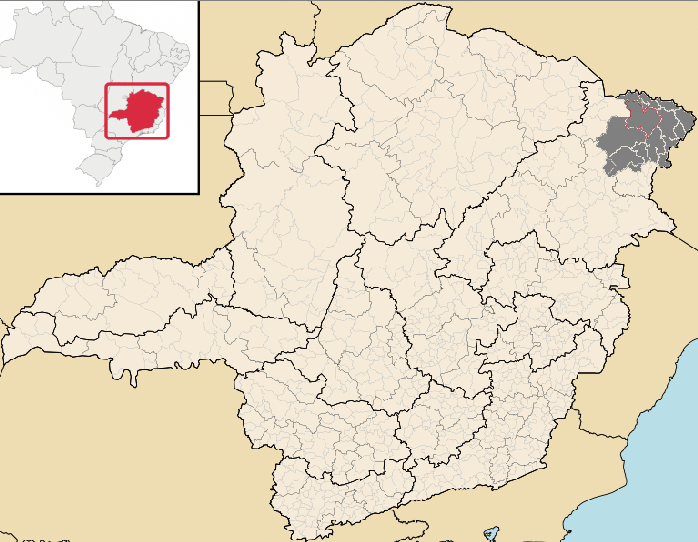
Map of the diocese.

The Roman Catholic Diocese of Almenara (Latin: Dioecesis Almenarensis) is a diocese located in the city of Almenara, Minas Gerais, in the ecclesiastical province of Diamantina in Brazil.

== History ==
- March 28, 1981: Established as Diocese of Almenara from the Diocese of Araçuaí and Diocese of Teófilo Otoni

== Leadership ==
- Bishops of Almenara (Latin Rite)
  - José Geraldo Oliveira do Valle, C.S.S. (10 May 1982 – 31 Aug 1988), appointed Coadjutor Bishop of Guaxupé, Minas Gerais
  - Diogo Johannes Antonius Reesink, O.F.M. (2 Aug 1989 – 25 Mar 1998), appointed Bishop of Teófilo Otoni, Minas Gerais
  - Hugo María van Steekelenburg, O.F.M. (23 Jun 1999 – 19 Jun 2013)
  - José Carlos Brandão Cabral (15 Sep 2013–2022)
  - José Hamilton de Castro (2023-present)
