= Sebastião Roque Rabelo Mendes =

Brazilian priest (1929–2020)

- Bishop of Leopoldina
- Church: Catholic Church
- Diocese: Diocese of Leopoldina
- In office: 5 August 1985 – 10 May 1989
- Predecessor: Geraldo Ferreira Reis
- Successor: Ricardo Pedro Chaves Pinto Filho
- Other posts: Auxiliary Bishop of Belo Horizonte (1989-2004); Titular Bishop of Ploaghe (1989-2020)

Orders
- Ordination: 8 December 1954 by Antônio dos Santos Cabral
- Consecration: 9 November 1985 by João Resende Costa

Personal details
- Born: 9 October 1929 Itapecerica, Minas Gerais, Republic of the United States of Brazil
- Died: 11 March 2020 (aged 90) Belo Horizonte, Minas Gerais, Brazil

Sebastião Roque Rabelo Mendes (9 October 1929 – 11 March 2020) was a Brazilian Roman Catholic bishop.

Mendes was born in Brazil and was ordained to the priesthood in 1954. He served as bishop of the Roman Catholic Diocese of Leopoldina, Brazil, from 1985 to 1989. Mendes then served as titular bishop of Ploaghe and as auxiliary bishop of the Roman Catholic Archdiocese of Belo Horizonte, Brazil, from 1989 to 2004.
