= Church of Saint Francis of Assisi (São João del-Rei) =

Church in Minas Gerais, Brazil

- Igreja de São Francisco de Assis
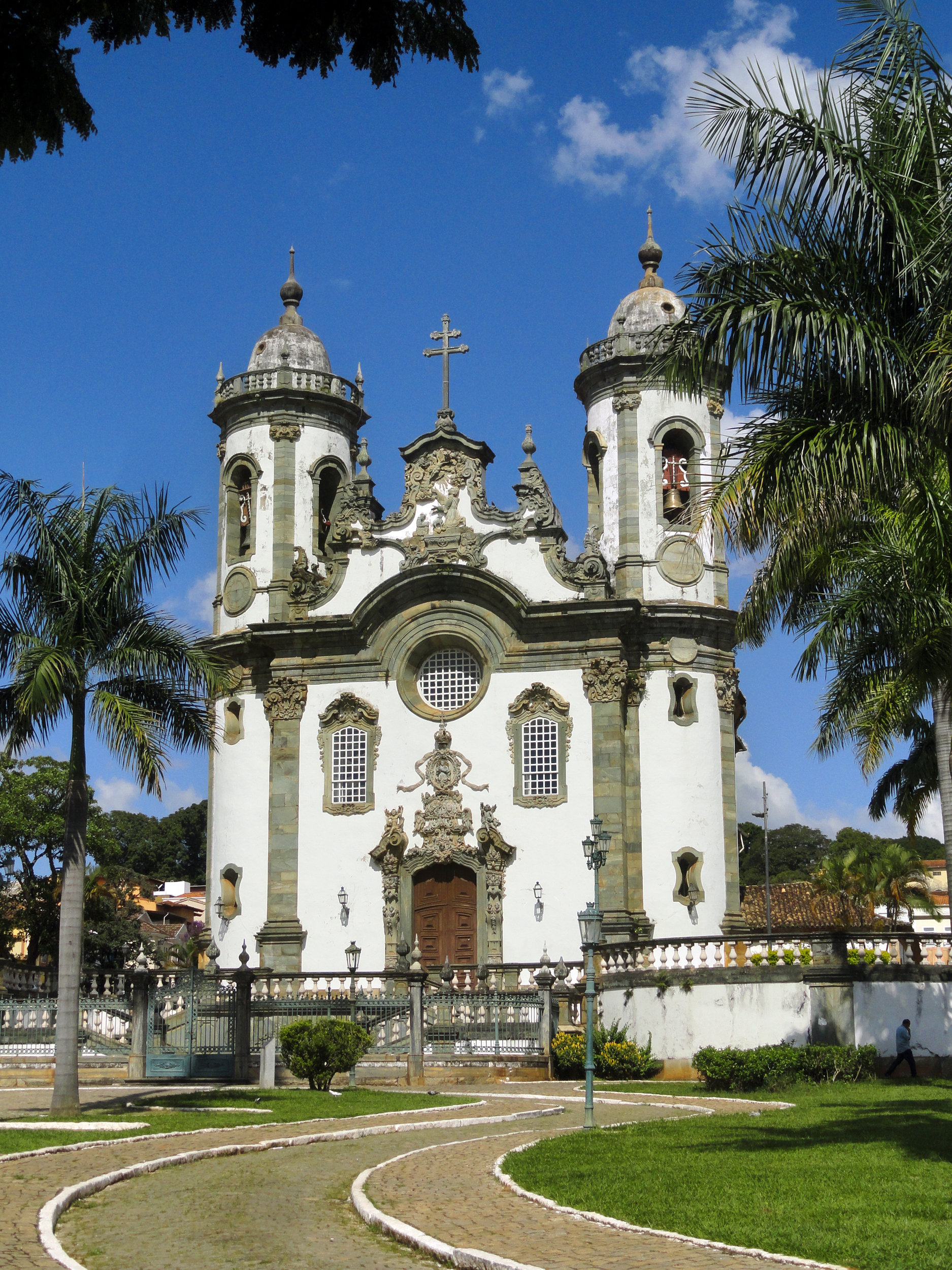
- Church of Saint Francis of Assisi
- 21.138889°S 44.26°W
- Location: São João del-Rei, Minas Gerais
- Country: Brazil
- Denomination: Roman Catholic Church

Architecture
- Architect(s): Aleijadinho; Francisco de Lima Cerqueira
- Style: Baroque
- Years built: 1774-1809

Administration
- Archdiocese: Archdiocese of Juiz de Fora
- Diocese: Diocese of São João del-Rei

National Historic Heritage of Brazil
- Designated: 1938
- Reference no.: 171

The Church of Saint Francis of Assisi (Portuguese: Igreja de São Francisco de Assis) is a Catholic temple founded by the Secular Franciscan Order in the Brazilian city of São João del-Rei, in the state of Minas Gerais. The church, started in 1774, is one of the main landmarks of Brazilian colonial art, becoming famous for the beauty of its architecture, the richness of its carving, and the work of Aleijadinho, later modified by Francisco Cerqueira. Due to its importance, the church was declared a national heritage site by the National Historic and Artistic Heritage Institute (IPHAN) along with its entire collection.

== History ==
The history of the Saint Francis of Assisi Church dates back to March 8, 1749, when the Secular Franciscan Order was founded, and canonically erected by the then Bishop of Mariana, Friar Manoel da Cruz.

However, the church deteriorated with time and in 1772, it was decided to build a new and larger one and preparations began immediately. Aleijadinho was hired to design the structure and decoration, and in 1774 Francisco de Lima Cerqueira was commissioned to begin the masonry work, but he introduced modifications to the towers, the pilasters of the crossing, the glasses of the nave, and the arrangement of the sacristy.

In 1781, the apse was essentially finished, with the collaboration of the master Francisco de Lima e Silva. The main altar was built from a project by Aleijadinho, modified by Cerqueira, and executed by Luís Pinheiro de Souza. Cerqueira was also responsible for the execution of almost all the sculptures and carvings, but the two altars of the crossing are considered to be the direct work of Aleijadinho.

By 1804, the nave and the other works in the body of the church had been finished and in 1809, Aniceto de Souza Lopes completed the towers and the choir, besides executing, according to IPHAN, the reliefs of the pediment and the frontispiece of the gate. Some scholars believe, however, that the reliefs of the gate are Aleijadinho's achievement.

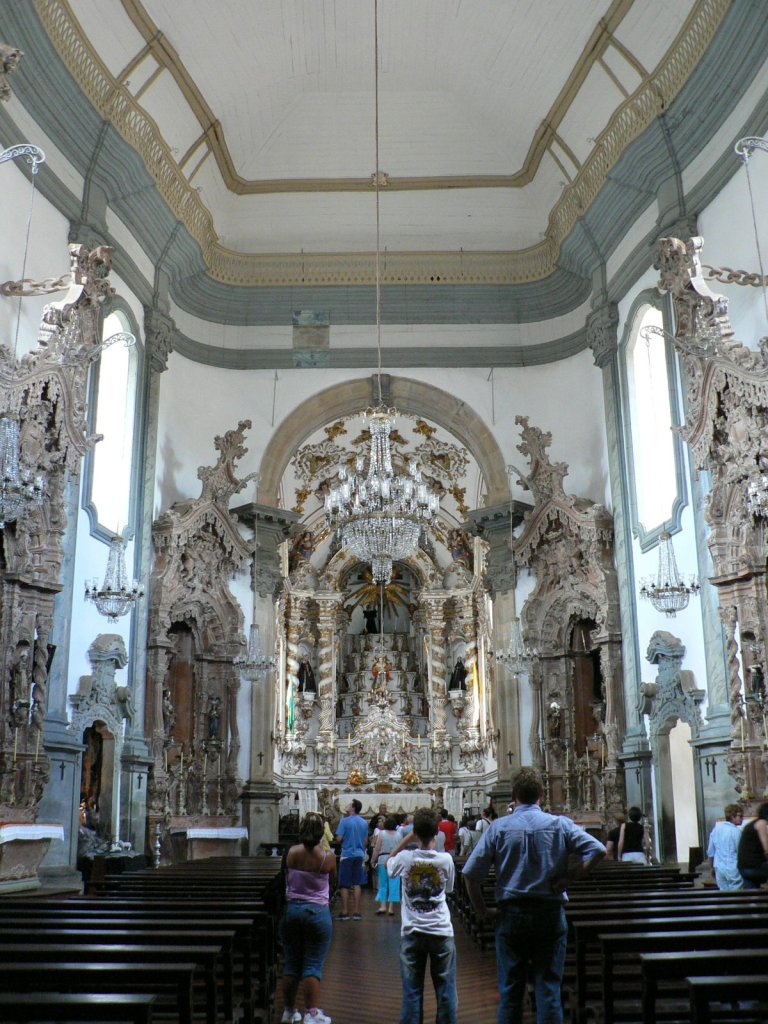
View from the inside of the church.

Unlike the apse, the altars of the nave were never gilded, and at some point were painted white. The ceiling of the nave was also not decorated, and only presents a central medallion in relief from which hangs a light fixture.

In the early 20th century, the church underwent several restoration works, carried out by the Serviço do Patrimônio Histórico e Artístico Nacional (SPHAN, now IPHAN), including the restoration of the choir and the throne of the high altar. In 1954, electric lighting was installed, and in 1956 the access staircase was stabilized. In 1959, the altar was restored. Later, the white paint covering the nave altars, considered a late addition, was removed, leaving them with the apparent wood.

== Structure ==
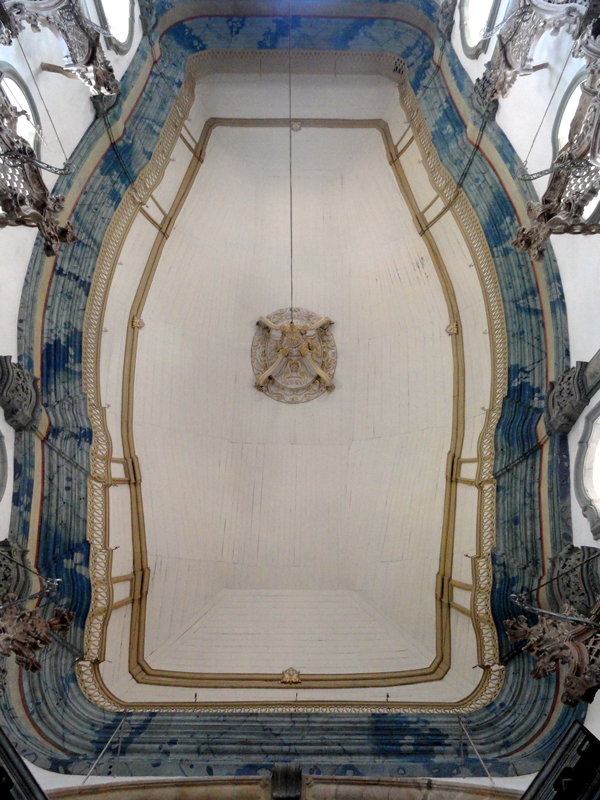
Image of the ceiling of the nave, which mirrors the original floor plan design.

The church is preceded by a wide stone-paved churchyard and surrounded by a balustrade. Its plan broadly follows the conventional model of colonial times, with a single nave with side altars, a choir over the entrance, a deep apse separated from the body of the nave by a monumental arch, and an attached sacristy. The nave differs from standard models, however, by its curved walls, characteristic of the Rococo style.

The façade also follows the dominant trends of the period, with a tripartite scheme composed of a central rectangular block for the body of the building and two lateral towers. The entrance is done through a single monumental door, adorned with a carved soapstone frame, with angels seated on the doorposts and an elaborate frontispiece.

On the upper level, two windows with frame ornamentation open up, and between them, a large rounded porthole has been created. This block is separated from the pediment by a wide architrave of stonework, with an arch in the center enclosing the oculus, over which rises a sophisticated pediment with volutes and broken arches, where there is a relief showing St. Francis on his knees and arms open, adoring the Seraphic Christ. The ensemble is crowned by a large Cross of Lorraine flanked by two bulbous pinnacles.

The towers have a round section, and up to the level of the architrave they are perforated by two widened ditches. Above the cornice, round arches open up to the bells. The towers are finished with a balustrade around bell-shaped spires, both finished by bulbous pinnacles.

== Artistic significance and decoration ==
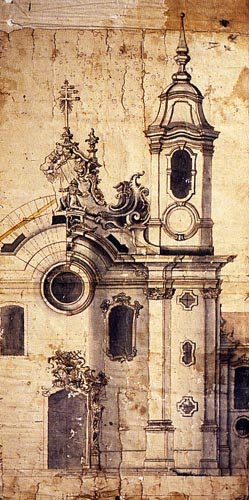
Aleijadinho's original project.

The layout and decoration of the façade still follow Aleijadinho's design in essence, with an aesthetic that blends elements of Joanine Baroque and Rococo. His authorship is assured by the survival of an incomplete autograph drawing of the front elevation of the building, today preserved in the Inconfidência Museum in Ouro Preto. According to IPHAN, "the rich composition of the doorway, with emphasis on the magnificent carvings that are organized in an elegant design" can be noticed. There appear the winged coats of arms of the Franciscan Order and the Kingdom of Portugal, on which a medallion bears the image of the praying Virgin among garlands and under a royal crown, from which hangs a banner with the Latin words Tota pulcra es Maria et macula originalis non est in te ("You are all beautiful, Mary, and you are free from original sin"). Cherub heads populate the composition.

The façade caught the attention of one of the first English travelers to pass through Minas Gerais in the 19th century, Sir Richard Burton, who considered it "the most spectacular in São João del-Rei, if not in all Minas Gerais," and admired the work done by a master who was told to execute his works "with instruments adjusted by an assistant to the stubs representing his arms."

Aleijadinho was one of the responsible for the elaboration of a new style in Minas Gerais, which shows the first signs of the formation of a genuinely Brazilian aesthetic, and which has no direct precedents in Portugal. Mário de Andrade, one of the most noted modernists engaged in the study of the colonial past, when this topic appeared at the beginning of the 20th century as a fulcrum for the nationalist aspirations of intellectuals and the search for the "true" cultural identity of the country, stated:

"Aleijadinho, arising from the lesson of Pedro Gomes Chaves, comes to genialize his manner, creating at the same time a typical church which is the only original solution that Brazilian architecture has ever invented. And what I find absolutely genius in this invention is that it contains some of the most intimate, most rooted, and most ethnic constants of the national psychology, it is a prototype of Brazilian religiosity. This type of church, immortally fixed in the two Francis churches of Ouro Preto and São João d'El-Rei, not only corresponds to the taste of the time, reflecting the Portuguese bases of the Colony but is already distinguished from the Luso-Colonial Baroque solutions, by such and such a denguice, by a more sensual and enchanting grace, by such a gentle 'delicacy', eminently Brazilian."

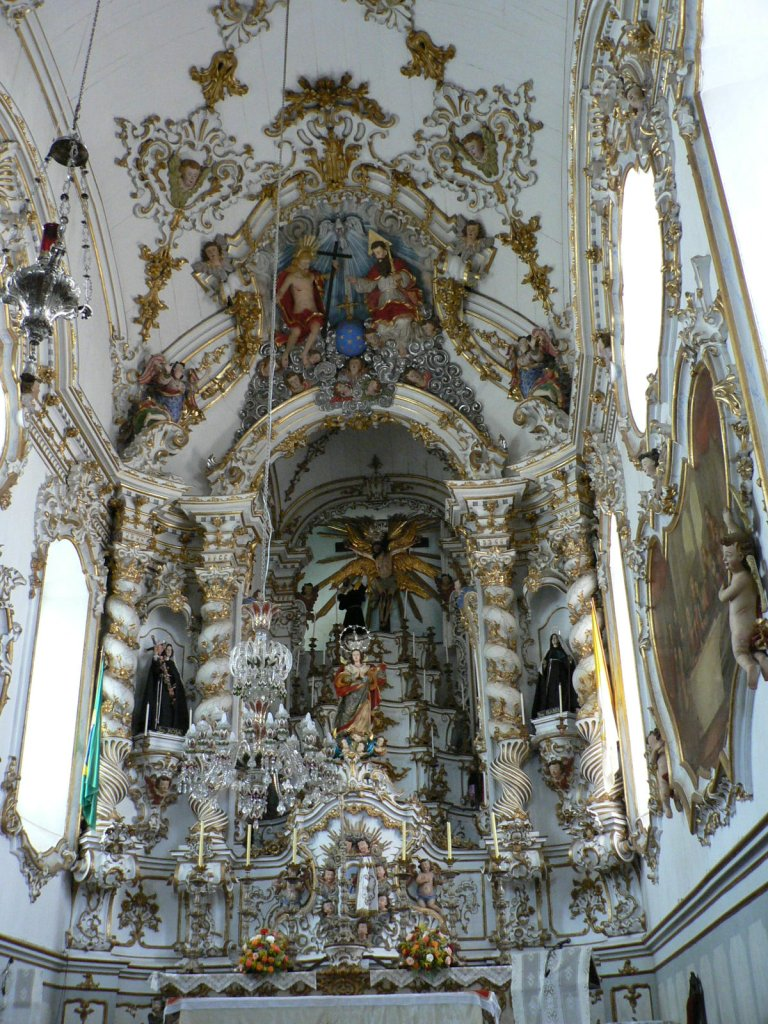
The apse and high altar.

The modifications introduced by Cerqueira, although considerable and object of great controversy, contributed to an increase in its originality, particularly in the solution he found for the towers, as pointed out by John Bury, who is one of the basic references for the study of colonial art in Brazil. Early scholars of the Brazilian Baroque, such as Lúcio Costa and Germain Bazin, tended to consider Cerqueira a traitor of Aleijadinho's legacy, and some still think so today, but his contribution has been reviewed, notably by Myriam Ribeiro de Oliveira, among others, as an important collaborator and a creative artist in his own right.

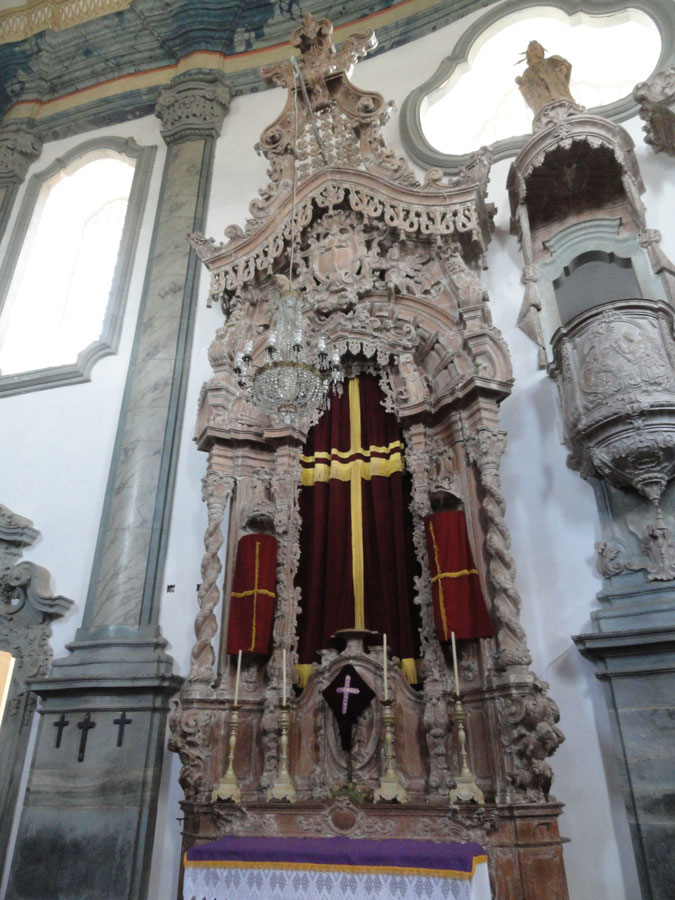
Side altar and pulpit.

A comparison between the original project of the façade and the work seen today shows that Cerqueira interfered in the towers, giving them a rounder profile, modifying the design of the spire, and eliminating one of the arrowslits; and, to a lesser degree, made changes to the pediment, simplifying its design. According to Oliveira, modifications to the original designs were a constant practice in colonial times, and he believes that if the original had been carried out in its entirety, it would be "the most genuinely Rococo of Minas Gerais' religious façades."

Still, in Oliveras' opinion, "what is extraordinary, in our view, is that the extent of these modifications has resulted in a work of such quality, produced by the sensitivity and technical expertise of Lima Cerqueira, and should consequently be evaluated in its values and not compared to an initial project that was not obeyed, as has been done until today", and for Bury, the Church of St. Francis shows "an exceptionally high artistic sensibility in its design and decoration". The historian continues:

"The characteristics of the 'Aleijadinho style' do not constitute a novelty in themselves. The originality is in their combination, in the way they were employed and harmonized. The clearest and striking aspect is the external ornamentation carved in high-relief. [...] Thus, although the decoration of façades with carvings and sculptures was not exactly a novelty in the churches of the XVIII century, the ornamentations attributed to Aleijadinho are unprecedented for their complexity, and, above all, for the delicacy of their ornaments. Such complexity and delicacy, common in the stucco and wood carvings of interiors, had rarely been reproduced in stone on church exteriors. Sir Richard Burton, writing about the façade of the Secular Franciscan Order in São João del-Rei, noted that 'the carving resembles wood carving, with very elaborate high reliefs."

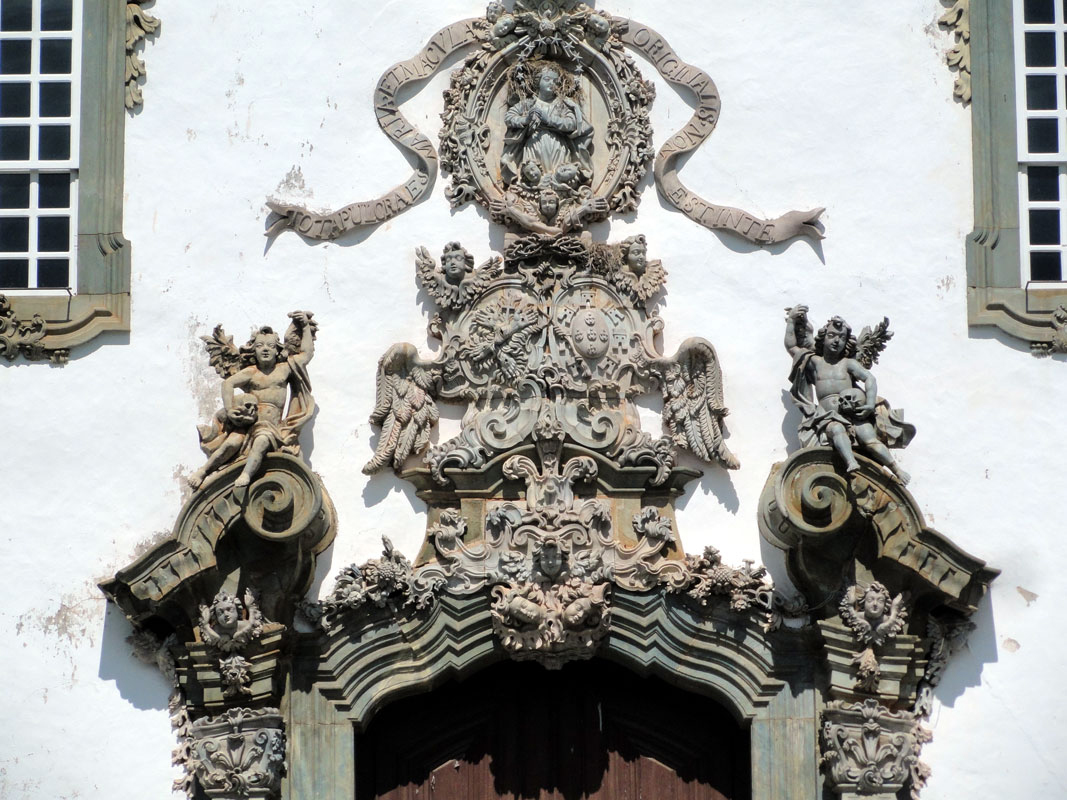
The reliefs on the frontispiece of the façade.

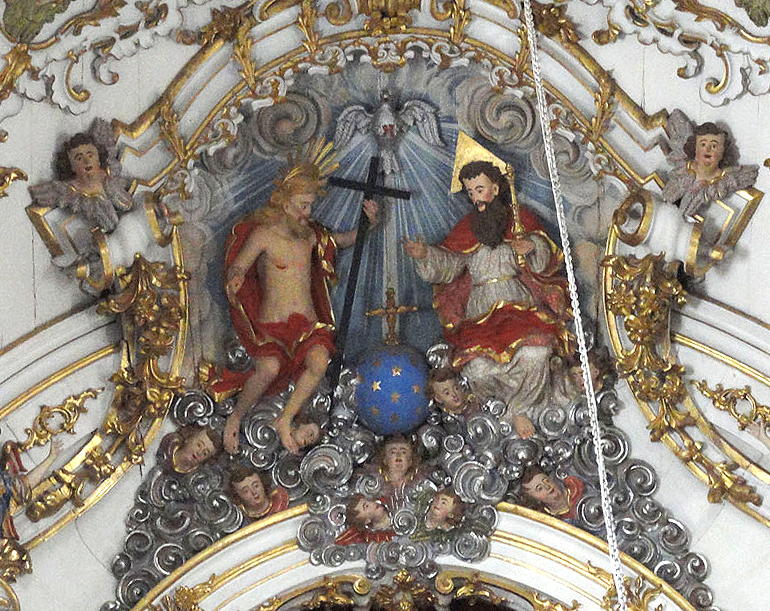
The frontispiece of the high altar.

Its interior is richly decorated with detailed carving on all the altars and pulpits, whose design was by Aleijadinho, in a style that merges influences from Joanine Baroque and Rococo. He also designed an image of John the Evangelist. The side altars follow the same basic model but differ greatly in details. They rise on a bombée bench, from which columns rise supporting a round arch with canopy, on whose frontispiece are angels holding medallions. The structure surrounds a large central niche for statuary, with smaller ones on the sides. Another canopy, larger, crowns the ensemble, with a large vertical railing. The two pulpits, one on each side of the nave, have conical canopies, where large statues are supported. The apse differs from the others structurally by the pairs of solid twisted columns and the absence of canopies, as well as by being gilded and painted. The throne is the traditional "stairway to heaven", on whose top was installed the image of St. Francis in adoration of the Seraphic Christ. According to IPHAN, the sculptural group that crowns the frontispiece, with a representation of the Holy Trinity that has similarities with the solution that Aleijadinho gave to the altar of the church of the same name in Ouro Preto, is a highlight. Its altars and sacristy keep an expressive collection of statuary, including several images of roca (dressed statues), among them those representing São Lúcio, Santa Rosa, Santo Ivo, and São Luís de França.

== Legends and traditions ==
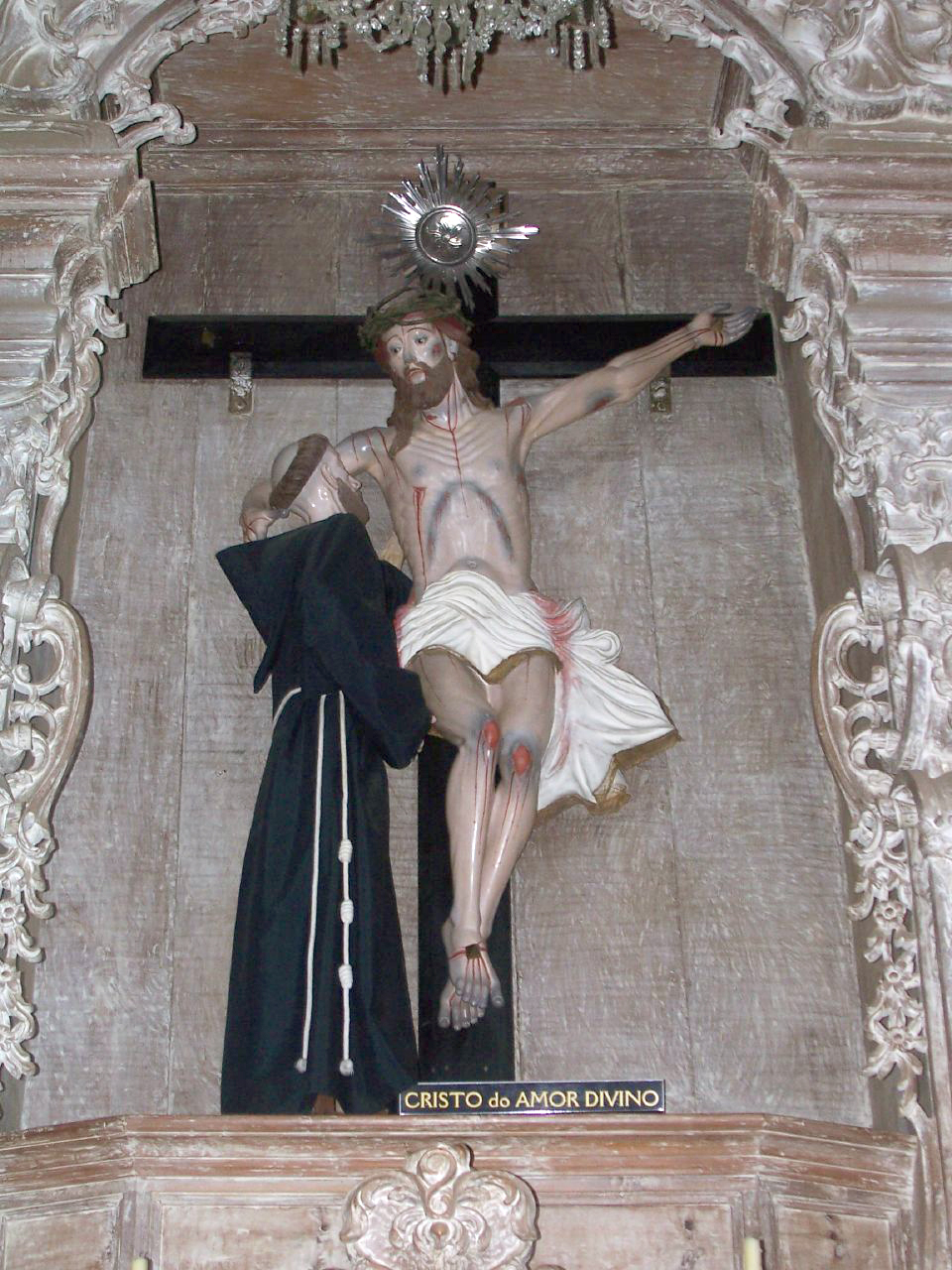
Images of St. Francis and Christ in one of the side altars.

There are many legends associated with the Church of Saint Francis. One of them refers to the statue that adorns its main altar stating that it miraculously appeared from nowhere. Legend adds that the bell ringer was removed from the belfry, arrested, and flogged for the crime he had "committed," but this narrative does not have any historical basis, although it was in fact a custom to remove the clapper from the bell and temporarily chain it when its operator died in activity.

On the other hand, the distinctive ringing of bells is an age-old tradition in São João del-Rei: The city gained fame for this as the place "where the bells speak," and the bells of Francis are still used today in a traditional "battle of bells" that dates back to colonial times, held in the Lent period among the city's churches, which compete in ringing them in the most vigorous and prolonged manner.

As in other places in Minas Gerais, the celebrations of Holy Week have special relevance in São João del-Rei, and the Francis of Assisi Church takes an active part in the solemnities. It is one of the focal points of the celebration of the Passion Steps, receiving from the Cathedral the image of Our Lord of the Steps in the Procession of the Deposits, held at night and by torchlight, which then takes part of the Procession of the Meeting in the Largo da Câmara, and receives the image of Our Lady of Sorrows that comes out of the Church of Carmo.

Since its early days, the church's worship and festivities have been characterized by the richness and inclusion of orchestral and vocal music. In the 18th century, the participation of a musical group was registered, which later split and reorganized itself in the 19th century as the Lira Sanjoanense and the Orquestra Ribeiro Bastos, two of the oldest musical associations in Brazil that are still active. Also of importance are the Christmas festivities and those of the church's patron saint, whose name is celebrated on October 4, but with celebrations over nine days. The other important festivities occur in the Quinquenas of St. Francis, which mark his reception of the stigmata, held between September 12 and 17. Such festivities usually have large popular participation and feature music by colonial and contemporary authors, including pieces composed especially for local Franciscan worship. Music featuring ancient works is also often associated with common Sunday worship.

For the beauty of its interior and the majesty of its external setting, the church is one of the most sought after for weddings, and its square is where the stage for many cultural events is set.

== See also ==
- 18th-century Western domes
