= Chico Lobo =

Francisco Antônio Lobo Leite, known as Chico Lobo (February 26, 1964 in São João del-Rei, state of Minas Gerais, Brazil) is a Brazilian musician.

He is the son of a seresteiro and active folklorist, as well as composer and performer.
