= Roman Catholic Archdiocese of Pouso Alegre =

Catholic ecclesiastical territory

Coordinates: 22.2310°S 45.9361°W

Archdiocese of Pouso Alegre Archidioecesis Pouso Alegre

Catholic
- Coat of arms

Location
- Country: Brazil

Statistics
- Area: 12,620 km^{2} (4,870 sq mi)
- Population: Total; Catholics: (as of 2004); 730,918; 660,580 (90.4%)

Information
- Rite: Latin Rite
- Established: 4 August 1900 (126 years ago)
- Cathedral: Good Jesus Cathedral, Pouso Alegre

Current leadership
- Pope: Leo XIV
- Metropolitan Archbishop: José Luiz Majella Delgado

Website
- arquidiocesepa.org.br

The Roman Catholic Archdiocese of Pouso Alegre (Latin: Archidioecesis Pouso Alegre) is an archdiocese located in the city of Pouso Alegre in Brazil.

== History ==
On 4 August 1900, Pope Leo XIII established the Diocese of Pouso Alegre from the Diocese of Mariana. Blessed John XXIII elevated the diocese to the a Metropolitan Archdiocese on 14 April 1962.

== Special churches ==
- Minor Basilicas:
  - Basilica de Nossa Senhora do Carmo, Borda da Mata, Minas Gerais

== Bishops ==
=== Ordinaries, in reverse chronological order ===
- Archbishops of Pouso Alegre (Roman rite), below
  - Archbishop José Luiz Majella Delgado (2014.05.28 – present)
  - Archbishop Ricardo Pedro Chaves Pinto Filho, O. Praem. (1996.10.16 – 2014.05.28)
  - Archbishop João Bergese (1991.05.05 – 1996.03.21)
  - Archbishop José d’Angelo Neto (1962.04.14 – 1990.05.31), below
- Bishops of Pouso Alegre (Roman Rite)
  - Bishop José d’Angelo Neto (later Archbishop) (1960.03.12 – 1962.04.14)
  - Bishop Octávio Augusto Chagas de Miranda (1916.02.14 – 1959.10.29)
  - Bishop Antônio Augusto de Assis (1909.11.29 – 1916.02.07), appointed Bishop of Guaxupé, Minas Gerais; future Archbishop
  - Bishop João Batista Corrêa Nery (1901.05.18 – 1908.08.03), appointed Bishop of Campinas

=== Coadjutor bishop ===
- Oscar de Oliveira (1954–1959), did not succeed to see; appointed Coadjutor Archbishop of Mariana, Minas Gerais

=== Auxiliary bishops ===
- Antônio Augusto de Assis (1907–1909), appointed Bishop here
- João Bosco Oliver de Faria (1987–1992), appointed Bishop of Patos de Minas, Minas Gerais
- José Francisco Rezende Dias (2001–2005), appointed Bishop of Duque de Caxias, Rio de Janeiro

=== Other priests of this diocese who became bishops ===
- Antônio Carlos Félix, appointed Bishop of Luz, Minas Gerais in 2003
- Marco Aurélio Gubiotti, appointed Bishop of Itabira-Fabriciano, Minas Gerais in 2013
- Edson José Oriolo dos Santos, appointed Auxiliary Bishop of Belo Horizonte, Minas Gerais in 2015

== Suffragan dioceses ==
- Diocese of Campanha
- Diocese of Guaxupé
