= São João del-Rei Airport =

Prefeito Octávio de Almeida Neves Airport Aeroporto Prefeito Octávio de Almeida Neves
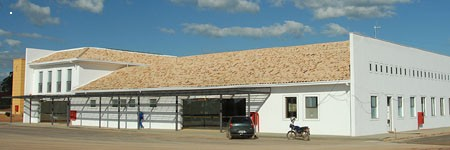
- IATA: JDR; ICAO: SNJR; LID: MG0034

Summary
- Airport type: Public
- Operator: Socicam
- Serves: São João del-Rei
- Time zone: BRT (UTC−03:00)
- Elevation AMSL: 945 m (3,100 ft)
- Coordinates: 21°05′08″S 044°13′31″W
- Website: sjdr-aero.com.br

Map
- Location in Brazil JDR (Brazil)

Runways
Direction	Length		Surface
Direction	m	ft	Surface
08/26	1,400	4,593	Asphalt
- Sources: Sources: Airport Website, ANAC, DECEA

Prefeito Octávio de Almeida Neves Airport (IATA: JDR, ICAO: SNJR) is the airport serving São João del-Rei, Brazil. The airport is named after a former Mayor of São João del-Rei.

It is operated by Socicam.

== History ==
On March 7, 2012, because of safety concerns, the National Civil Aviation Agency of Brazil (ANAC) imposed operational restrictions related to scheduled flights on the airport until irregularities are solved. General aviation operations were not affected.

== Airlines and destinations ==
Airlines	Destinations
Azul Conecta	Belo Horizonte–Confins

== Access ==
The airport is located 8 km (5 mi) from downtown São João del-Rei.

== See also ==
- List of airports in Brazil
