= José de Almeida Batista Pereira =

- Bishop of Diocese of Guaxupé (Emeritus)
- Church: Roman Catholic Church
- See: Diocese of Guaxupé
- In office: 1964–1978
- Predecessor: Inácio João Dal Monte
- Successor: José Alberto Lopes de Castro Pinto
- Previous post(s): Priest

Orders
- Ordination: 22 December 1940

Personal details
- Born: 26 July 1917; São Gonçalo, Brazil
- Died: 31 January 2009 (aged 91); Nova Friburgo, Brazil

José de Almeida Batista Pereira (26 July 1917 – 30 January 2009) was a Brazilian bishop of the Roman Catholic Church.

Pereira was born in São Gonçalo, Brazil and was ordained a priest on 22 December 1940. He was appointed Auxiliary bishop of the Diocese of Niteroi, along with Titular Bishop of Baris in Pisidia, on 22 December 1953 and ordained titular bishop of Baris in Pisidia on 2 February 1954. In 1955, Pereira was appointed bishop of the Diocese of Sete Lagoas where he remained until 1964. On 7 April 1964, Pereira was appointed bishop of the Diocese of Guaxupé where he remained until his resignation from the diocese 16 January 1976.
