= Diocese of Guaxupé =

Catholic ecclesiastical territory

Coordinates: 21.3057°S 46.7121°W

Diocese of Guaxupé Dioecesis Guaxupensis

Catholic
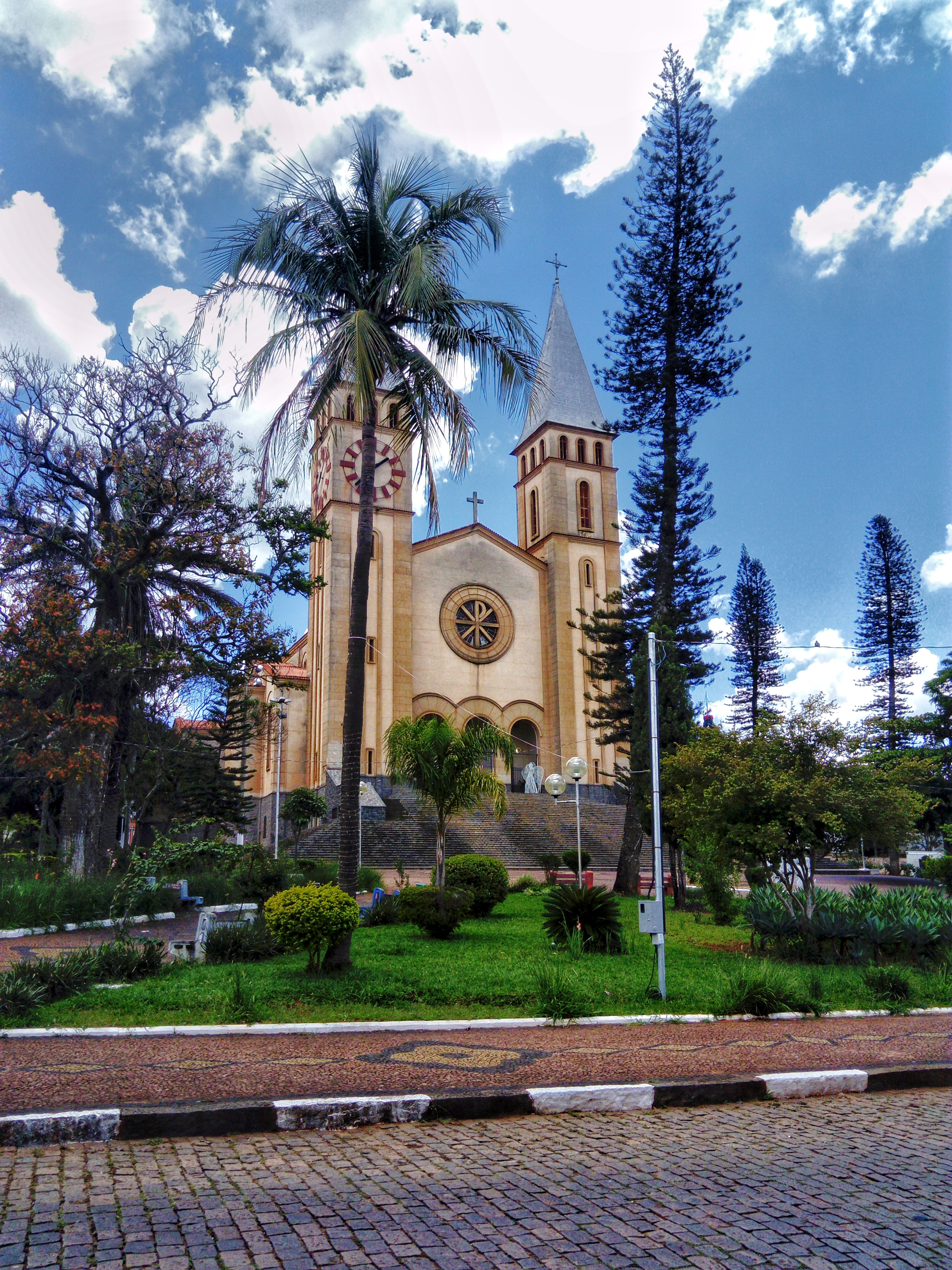
- Guaxupé Cathedral

Location
- Country: Brazil
- Ecclesiastical province: Pouso Alegre

Statistics
- Area: 13,953 km^{2} (5,387 sq mi)
- Population: Total; Catholics: (as of 2006); 867,000; 608,000 (70.1%)

Information
- Rite: Latin Rite
- Established: 3 February 1916 (110 years ago)
- Cathedral: Catedral Nossa Senhora das Dores

Current leadership
- Pope: Leo XIV
- Bishop: José de Lanza Neto
- Metropolitan Archbishop: José Luiz Majella Delgado
- Bishops emeritus: José Geraldo Oliveira do Valle, C.S.S.

The Roman Catholic Diocese of Guaxupé (Latin: Dioecesis Guaxupensis) is a diocese located in the city of Guaxupé in the ecclesiastical province of Pouso Alegre in Brazil.

== History ==
- 3 February 1916: Established as Diocese of Guaxupé from the Diocese of Pouso Alegre

== Special churches ==
- Minor Basilicas:
  - Basílica Nossa Senhora da Saúde, Poços de Caldas, Minas Gerais

== Bishops ==
- Bishops of Guaxupé (Roman rite), in reverse chronological order
  - Bishop José Lanza Neto (2007.06.13 – present)
  - Bishop José Mauro Pereira Bastos, C.P. (2006.04.19 – 2006.09.14)
  - Bishop José Geraldo Oliveira do Valle, C.S.S. (1989.09.14 – 2006.04.19)
  - Bishop José Alberto Lopes de Castro Pinto (1976.01.16 – 1989.09.14)
  - Bishop José de Almeida Batista Pereira (1964.04.02 – 1976.01.16)
  - Bishop Inácio João Dal Monte, O.F.M. Cap. (1952.05.21 – 1963.05.29)
  - Bishop Hugo Bressane de Araújo (1940.09.19 – 1951.09.03), appointed Coadjutor Archbishop of Belo Horizonte, Minas Gerais
  - Bishop Ranulfo da Silva Farias (1920.04.22 – 1939.08.05), appointed Archbishop of Maceió, Alagoas
  - Father António Emidio Corrêa (1919.07.03), did not take effect
  - Bishop Antônio Augusto de Assis (1916.02.07 – 1918.08.02), appointed Auxiliary Bishop of Mariana, Minas Gerais; future Archbishop

=== Coadjutor bishop ===
- José Geraldo Oliveira do Valle, C.S.S. (1988-1989)

=== Other priests of this diocese who became bishops ===
- Hermínio Malzone Hugo, appointed Bishop of Governador Valadares, Minas Gerais in 1957
- Geraldo Ferreira Reis, appointed Bishop of Leopoldina, Minas Gerais in 1961
- Messias dos Reis Silveira, appointed Bishop of Uruaçu (Uruassu), Goias n 2007
