= Diogo Reesink =

Brazilian-Dutch Roman Catholic bishop (1934–2019)

Diogo Reesink O.F.M.
- Bishop of Teófilo Otoni
- Church: Catholic Church
- Diocese: Diocese of Teófilo Otoni
- In office: 25 March 1998 – 25 November 2009
- Predecessor: Waldemar Chaves de Araújo
- Successor: Aloísio Jorge Pena Vitral
- Previous post: Bishop of Almenara (1989-1998)

Orders
- Ordination: 15 July 1962
- Consecration: 21 October 1989 by Cristiano Portela de Araújo Pena

Personal details
- Born: Johannes Antonius Reesink; 28 July 1934 Heerlerheide, Limburg, Netherlands
- Died: 30 May 2019 (aged 84) Divinópolis, Minas Gerais, Brazil

Diogo Johannes Antonius Reesink (28 July 1934 – 30 May 2019) was a Brazilian-Dutch Roman Catholic bishop.

Reesink was born in the Netherlands and was ordained to the priesthood in 1962. He served as bishop of the Roman Catholic Diocese of Almenara, Brazil, from 1989 to 1998. He then served as the Bishop of the Roman Catholic Diocese of Teófilo Otoni, Brazil, from 1998 to 2009.
