= José Geraldo Oliveira do Valle =

Brazilian Roman Catholic bishop (born 1929)

The Most Reverend José Geraldo Oliveira do Valle C.S.S.
- Bishop Emeritus of Guaxupé
- Church: Catholic Church
- Diocese: Guaxupé
- Appointed: 14 September 1989
- Term ended: 19 April 2006
- Predecessor: José Alberto Lopes de Castro Pinto
- Successor: José Mauro Pereira Bastos

Orders
- Ordination: 10 January 1954
- Consecration: 23 July 1982 by Silvestre Luís Scandián

Personal details
- Born: 3 December 1929 (age 96) Leme, São Paulo, Brazil
- Denomination: Catholic Church
- Motto: Amar – Servir – Unir

José Geraldo Oliveira do Valle, C.S.S. (born 3 December 1929) is a Brazilian Roman Catholic prelate, who served as the first bishop of the Diocese of Almenara and later as the seventh Bishop of the Diocese of Guaxupé in Brazil.

== Early life and priesthood ==
José Geraldo Oliveira do Valle was born on 3 December 1929 in Leme, in the state of São Paulo, Brazil. He joined the Congregation of the Sacred Stigmata (Stigmatines) and was ordained a priest on 10 January 1954.

== Episcopal ministry ==
On 10 May 1982, Pope John Paul II appointed Oliveira do Valle as the first bishop of the newly established Diocese of Almenara, in the state of Minas Gerais. He received episcopal consecration on 23 July 1982, with Archbishop Silvestre Luís Scandián serving as principal consecrator.

On 31 August 1988, he was appointed Coadjutor Bishop of the Diocese of Guaxupé and succeeded as diocesan bishop on 14 September 1989. During his tenure, he emphasized priestly formation, pastoral organization, and the expansion of parish life throughout the diocese.

Upon reaching the age of 75, he submitted his resignation in accordance with canon law. His resignation was accepted by Pope Benedict XVI on 19 April 2006, after which he assumed the title of Bishop Emeritus of Guaxupé.

== Later life ==
Following his retirement, Oliveira do Valle continued to reside in Brazil and remained active in pastoral and spiritual activities within his religious congregation and former dioceses.

== See also ==
- Roman Catholic Diocese of Almenara
- Roman Catholic Diocese of Guaxupé
- Catholic Church in Brazil
