= Good Jesus Cathedral, Pouso Alegre =

Good Jesus Cathedral
- Catedral Metropolitana Bom Jesus
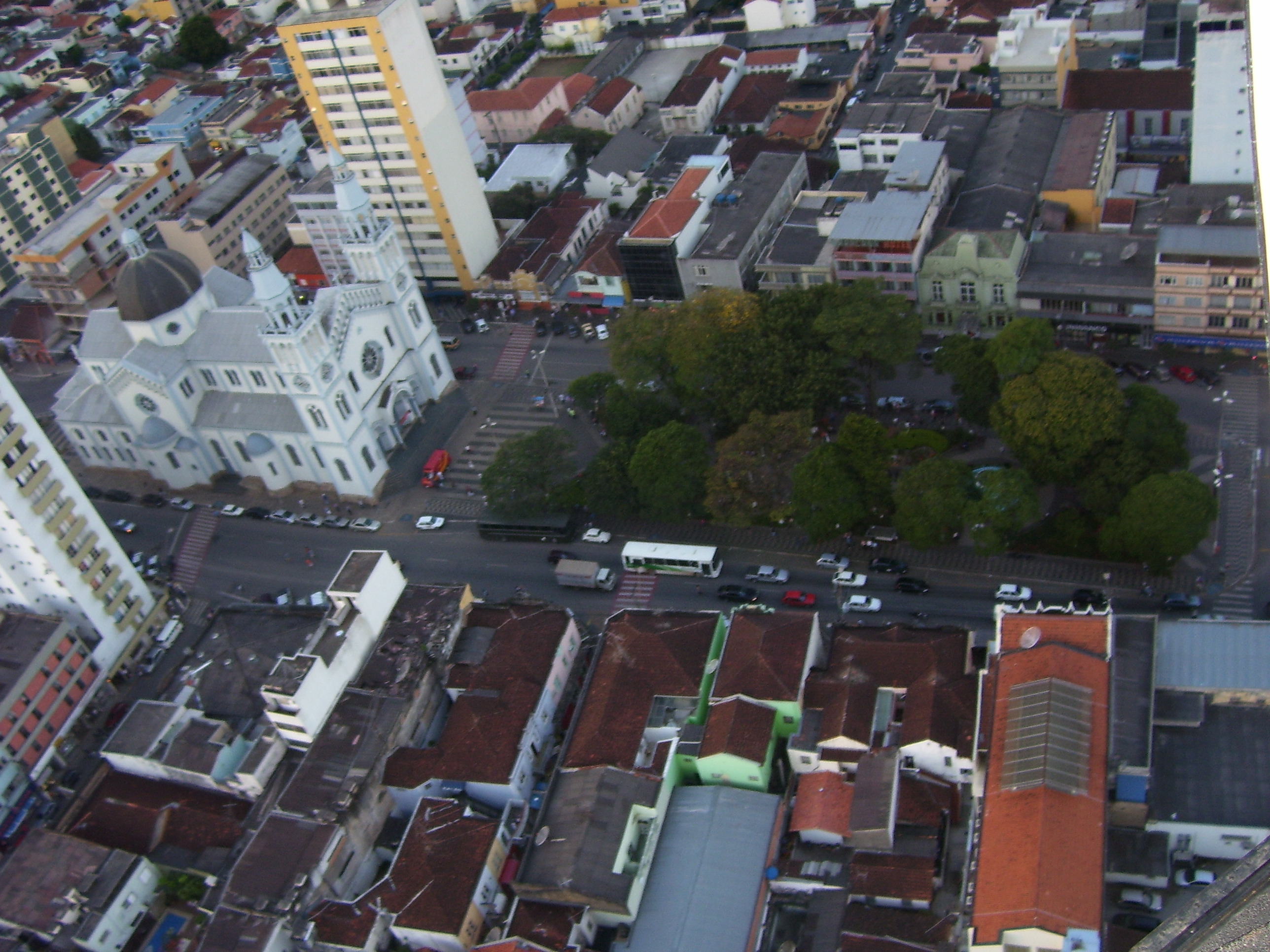
- Good Jesus Cathedral
- Location: Pouso Alegre
- Country: Brazil
- Denomination: Roman Catholic Church

Administration
- Archdiocese: Roman Catholic Archdiocese of Pouso Alegre

The Good Jesus Cathedral (Portuguese: Catedral Metropolitana Bom Jesus) Also Pouso Alegre Cathedral It is a religious building of the Catholic church located in the city of Pouso Alegre, in the state of Minas Gerais in Brazil. It is the seat of the Archdiocese of Pouso Alegre.

In the place where the cathedral is, was built in 1802 a chapel dedicated to the Good Lord Jesus. With the rise of the city of Mandu, original nucleus of Pouso Alegre, to the status of freguesia the 6 of November 1810, was established the following year to the Parish of the Good Lord Jesus. The old chapel was demolished in 1849 and the following year began the construction of the Mother Church of the Good Lord Jesus, directed by Colonel José García Machado and finished in 1857. With the creation of the Pouso Alegre diocese in 1900, The structure was elevated to the status of cathedral.

== See also ==
- Roman Catholicism in Brazil
- Cathedral of the Lord Good Jesus of the Remedies
- List of cathedrals in Brazil
