= José Maria Xavier =

Brazilian Roman Catholic priest and composer

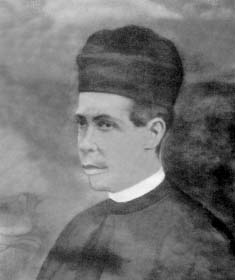
- Portrait of Father José Maria Xavier
- Born: August 23, 1819; São João del-Rei, Captaincy of Minas Gerais, United Kingdom of Portugal, Brazil and the Algarves
- Died: January 22, 1887 (aged 67); São João del-Rei, Minas Gerais Province, Empire of Brazil
- Occupations: Roman Catholic priest, composer
- Notable work: Offices of Darkness, Matins for Holy Week, Matinas do Natal, Missa No. 5

José Maria Xavier (23 August 1819 – 22 January 1887) was a Brazilian Roman Catholic priest, composer, instrumentalist, and music teacher from São João del-Rei, Minas Gerais. Born into a family of church musicians, he sang in its ensemble as a child and later worked as a clarinetist, violinist, and violist. He entered the Seminary of Mariana in 1845, was ordained the following year, and spent most of his priesthood in São João del-Rei, where he taught music and served churches, brotherhoods (Note: Brotherhoods, confraternities, and third orders were Catholic lay associations. They paid for Masses, processions, funerals, charity, and music, and often hired singers and instrumentalists for feast days.), schools, and charitable institutions. In 1872, Xavier received a silver medal for his religious music at the Fifth Industrial Exhibition of Minas Gerais, and Emperor Pedro II wrote admiringly of his music after hearing it in 1881.

More than 100 compositions bear Xavier's name. His scores follow the church year, from Christmas matins (Note: Matins is a long service built around psalms, readings, and responsories. It was traditionally sung at night or before dawn, though local custom could place it on the evening before.) and saints' novenas to the long offices of Holy Week. He wrote masses, matins, offices, antiphons, hymns, motets, and procession music, usually for four-part choir (Note: A four-part choir is divided into soprano, alto, tenor, and bass voices, often shortened to SATB.) with strings and winds. The flute, clarinet, and valved trumpet often carry the more active melodic writing, at times joining the voices and at others stepping forward as solo instruments.

Most of his music circulated in handwritten scores and performing parts. (Note: A performing part contains only the music needed by one singer or instrumentalist. A full score places all the parts together for the conductor.) Two works for choir and orchestra, Missa No. 5 and Matinas do Natal, were printed in Munich in 1884 and 1885. His compositions have since been edited, recorded, and studied, and they are still heard during Holy Week in São João del-Rei. The city's state music conservatory has borne his name since 1954, and he is the patron of Chair No. 12 of the Brazilian Academy of Music. (Note: In the Brazilian Academy of Music, a numbered chair is a lifelong seat held by an elected member. Each chair is dedicated to a patron from Brazilian music history.)

== Biography ==
=== Family and musical training ===
José Maria Xavier was born on 23 August 1819 in a house on Rua Santo Antônio in São João del-Rei. His father, João Xavier da Silva Ferrão, was an ensign (Note: The Portuguese rank was alferes, a junior commissioned-officer rank.) from Mariana. His mother, Maria José Benedita de Miranda, was born in São João del-Rei.

Xavier grew up among musicians on his mother's side. His maternal grandfather, José Joaquim de Miranda, founded the ensemble that became the Orquestra Lira Sanjoanense. Four of Xavier's maternal uncles performed with the group. One of them, Francisco de Paula Miranda, directed one of the city's church choirs and gave Xavier his first music lessons.

Xavier learned his first letters from Guilherme José da Costa. He went on to study Latin, French, history, geography, and philosophy with teachers in São João del-Rei. His lessons with Francisco de Paula Miranda covered singing, violin, and clarinet, and he also learned to play the viola, piano, and guitar.

At nine, Xavier sang treble (Note: Here, treble means the high vocal line usually sung by a boy before his voice changed.) with his family's ensemble. The Third Order of Our Lady of Mount Carmel paid him for this work in 1828. By 1837, he was the group's first clarinetist, and he also performed as a violinist and violist. Before entering the seminary, he taught music in private homes and worked as a clerk in the law office of José Maria da Câmara.

=== Seminary and early priesthood ===
In 1845, Xavier entered the Seminary of Mariana to study theology. Antônio Ferreira Viçoso, bishop of Mariana, ordained him to the priesthood on 19 April 1846. Xavier celebrated his first solemn Mass on 23 May at the mother church of Our Lady of the Pillar in São João del-Rei.

In February 1847, Xavier became vicar of Rio Preto. He remained there until May 1848, when poor health led him to seek permission to return to São João del-Rei. He spent the rest of his life in his native city.

=== Career in São João del-Rei ===
After his return, Xavier resumed teaching music. He taught at Colégio Duval and other schools in São João del-Rei and served as the college's chaplain. From 1854 to 1856, he was vicar forane (Note: A vicar forane is a priest appointed by the bishop to oversee a group of parishes in one district. The office is also called a dean.) of the district of São João del-Rei.

Xavier held offices in the brotherhoods, confraternities, and third orders that arranged the city's church ceremonies. From 1855 to 1856, he was an officer of the Third Order of Saint Francis and the Confraternity of Saint Francis of Assisi and Saint Gonçalo Garcia. He served as commissary (Note: In a third order, the commissary was the priest responsible for spiritual direction and dealings with church authorities.) of the Third Order of Our Lady of Mount Carmel from 1859 to 1870. He was also chaplain of the Brotherhood of Our Lord of the Steps and the Confraternity of Our Lady of the Rosary.

He presided for more than ten years over the Vincentian confraternity at Our Lady of the Pillar and worked with the Confraternity of Saint Gonçalo Garcia. Xavier belonged to the Conference of Saint Vincent de Paul and the Brotherhood of Our Lady of the Good Death. In 1879 and 1880, he was elected administrator of the Santa Casa da Misericórdia of São João del-Rei. He wrote music for the feasts and services organized by these institutions, many of which employed choirs and instrumental ensembles drawn from the city.

=== Recognition during his lifetime ===
In 1872, Xavier received a silver medal for his religious music at the Fifth Industrial Exhibition of Minas Gerais.

During an 1881 visit to Minas Gerais, Emperor Pedro II heard Xavier's music and wrote admiringly of it in his diary.

=== Final years and death ===
Xavier had recurring health problems after his ordination. In January 1887, he fell while pruning shrubs in his garden and fractured his leg near the hip. His condition worsened while he was confined to bed, and he died in São João del-Rei on 22 January 1887, aged 67.

His funeral was held on 23 January with the participation of the religious orders, brotherhoods, and confraternities in which he had served. After a solemn Mass, he was buried in the Cemetery of Our Lady of the Rosary in São João del-Rei.

== Music ==
More than 100 compositions bear Xavier's name. Most were written for Catholic worship and for the choirs and orchestras of São João del-Rei. The catalogue follows the church calendar, with masses, matins, offices, novenas, antiphons, (Note: An antiphon is a short chant sung before or after a psalm or canticle. A motet is a choral setting of a sacred text.) litanies, hymns, motets, and music for processions.

A few works fall outside the vocal liturgy. The catalogue lists instrumental minuets and an overture, as well as Pensamento sentimental, dated in Ouro Preto in 1886.

=== Liturgical repertory ===
For Holy Week, Xavier wrote matins for Maundy Thursday, Good Friday, and Holy Saturday in 1871. These settings and their lauds (Note: Lauds is the morning office in the Catholic daily cycle of prayer.) form the Ofício de Trevas (Note: Ofício de Trevas means "Office of Darkness" in Portuguese. During Tenebrae, candles are gradually extinguished as readings and responsories are sung.), or Tenebrae office. Other pieces set the Lamentations of Jeremiah, lessons, tracts, motets for the Adoration of the Cross, music for the burial procession, and the hymn Pange lingua (Note: Pange lingua is Latin for "Sing, my tongue." It is a hymn used in services centered on the Eucharist.) for a procession of the Blessed Sacrament. An office and a Credo for Palm Sunday followed in 1872.

Xavier also wrote for the feasts arranged by the brotherhoods and third orders in which he served. His dated novenas include Novena de Nossa Senhora da Boa Morte from 1855, Novena de São Gonçalo Garcia from 1856, Novena de Nossa Senhora das Dores from 1867, Novena de São Sebastião from 1869, and Novena da Santíssima Trindade from 1875. He composed matins for Christmas, the Assumption, the Immaculate Conception, Pentecost, Saint Cecilia, Saint Joseph, and the Sacred Heart. His masses were written for the Assumption, the Holy Spirit, Holy Saturday, cathedral services, and funerals.

The shorter works were made for particular moments in a service. They include antiphons for saints' feasts, hymns for novenas, music sung before sermons, settings of Tantum ergo, (Note: Tantum ergo is the closing part of Pange lingua and is often sung during Eucharistic services.) and chants for processions. Many could be combined with the larger masses, offices, and matins required for a full ceremony.

=== Voices and instruments ===
Xavier often wrote for soprano, alto, tenor, and bass with a small orchestra. One recurring wind group uses flute, clarinet, two horns, and a valved trumpet called a piston (Note: In nineteenth-century Brazilian scores, piston usually means a valved brass instrument related to the cornet.) in the manuscripts. First and second violins, viola, and bass complete the ensemble. Xavier used this scoring in Missa No. 5, Matinas do Natal, Ofício de Ramos, the Good Friday and Holy Saturday tracts, and Matinas da Ressurreição.

The flute, clarinet, and piston frequently carry a single melody together. They also divide into duos or take turns as solo instruments. Flute and clarinet may share one staff, moving in unison, at the octave, or in parallel thirds and sixths. The choir often sings in homophonic (Note: In homophonic writing, the voices move together in nearly the same rhythm, which makes the words easier to follow.) chords, keeping the Latin words clear while the wind parts carry the more active melodic lines.

Xavier gave the flute a solo part in six works, Novena de Nossa Senhora do Carmo, Matinas do Natal de Nosso Senhor Jesus Cristo, Hino de Nossa Senhora das Mercês, Novena de São Sebastião, Matinas de Santa Cecília, and Antífona de São João Evangelista. In the fourth responsory of Matinas de Santa Cecília, the flute is answered by clarinet and cornet as the choir sings in chordal blocks. In Antífona de São João Evangelista, flute and first violin begin with the same melody before the baritone and choir enter.

Four manuscripts name Gioachino Rossini as the source of adapted melodies. The 1839 Qui sedes and Quoniam, written for bass solo, are based on a Rossini trio. Creator alme siderum uses music from Mosè in Egitto, an arranged Mass draws on Le siège de Corinthe, and Jam nunc Paterna claritas uses music from Semiramide.

Xavier sometimes added directions for the musicians to his scores. On the 1872 manuscript of Ofício de Domingo de Ramos, he asked performers to moderate the tempos, especially the Allegros, to suit the decorum of sacred music.

=== Manuscripts and printed editions ===
Most of Xavier's music circulated in handwritten scores and separate performing parts. Copies are held in musical archives in Minas Gerais, São Paulo, Rio de Janeiro, and Goiás. The archives of the Orquestra Lira Sanjoanense and the Orquestra Ribeiro Bastos in São João del-Rei hold manuscripts and performing parts used in editions of his music. Other materials used by editors are held by the Orquestra Ramalho in Tiradentes and music collections in Itapecerica and Viçosa.

Some parts contain missing rests, unclear notes, inconsistent syllabification, and differences in instrumentation. Editors must also decide how many players to use and how to approach music written for nineteenth-century simple-system flutes (Note: A simple-system flute has fewer keys and uses fingerings common before the Boehm system became standard. Its tone and tuning respond differently from those of a modern concert flute.) when it is performed on a Boehm-system flute.

Two works for choir and orchestra were printed in Munich during Xavier's lifetime. Missa No. 5 was printed in 1884, with the Kyrie and Gloria. (Note: The Kyrie and Gloria are two standard sections of the Mass. The Kyrie asks for mercy, and the Gloria is a hymn of praise.) Matinas do Natal was printed in 1885, with an invitatory and eight responsories. (Note: A responsory is sung after a reading. A soloist or small group sings the verse, and the choir answers with a refrain.) The publisher and plate numbers (Note: Music publishers engraved identifying numbers on printing plates. These numbers can help establish who printed a score and when.) are unknown. Most Brazilian sacred scores printed in the nineteenth century paired a solo voice with piano, organ, or harmonium. Xavier's two editions were issued for choir and orchestra.

=== Selected works ===
Selected dated works are listed below.

Work	Year	Liturgical use and scoring	Notes
Qui sedes and Quoniam	1839	Sections of the Gloria for bass solo	Based on a trio by Rossini
Missa da Assunção	1851	Mass for the Assumption	
Novena de Nossa Senhora da Boa Morte	1855	Novena of Our Lady of the Good Death	
Matinas do Natal de Nosso Senhor Jesus Cristo	1866	Christmas matins for choir and orchestra	Contains a solo flute part and was printed in Munich in 1885
Novena de São Sebastião	1869	Novena of Saint Sebastian	Contains a solo flute part
Matinas do Espírito Santo	1869	Matins for Pentecost, for choir and orchestra	
Missa de Catedral	1870	Mass	
Matinas de Quinta-feira Santa	1871	Matins for Maundy Thursday, for choir and orchestra	Part of the Ofício de Trevas
Matinas de Sexta-feira Santa	1871	Matins for Good Friday	Part of the Ofício de Trevas
Matinas de Sábado Santo	1871	Matins for Holy Saturday	Part of the Ofício de Trevas
Ofício de Domingo de Ramos	1872	Office for Palm Sunday	The manuscript asks performers to moderate the Allegro tempos
Adoramus te Christe	1875	Holy Week motet for choir and chamber orchestra	
Missa de Requiem	1876	Requiem Mass	
Missa No. 5	1880	Kyrie and Gloria for choir and orchestra	Printed in Munich in 1884

== Legacy ==
=== Conservatory and institutional commemoration ===
In May 1915, a herm of Xavier was unveiled in Largo do Rosário, in front of the Church of Our Lady of the Rosary in São João del-Rei. The project had begun in 1911, when a committee was formed to raise funds for the monument. In 1937, a bronze plaque was added and the monument was raised on an additional granite step.

The state music conservatory in São João del-Rei opened on 1 March 1953 as the Conservatório Mineiro de Música de São João del-Rei. Its courses began on 21 March with an inaugural lecture in the auditorium of Rádio São João. The school was established to support the Lira Sanjoanense and Ribeiro Bastos orchestras. Minas Gerais Decree No. 4,185, issued on 5 March 1954, renamed it the Conservatório Estadual de Música Padre José Maria Xavier. The conservatory moved to its own building on Rua Padre José Maria Xavier in 1960.

Xavier is the patron of Chair No. 12 of the Brazilian Academy of Music. The chair was founded by Octavio Bevilacqua, and its first successor was the musicologist José Maria Neves. He is also the patron of Permanent Chair No. 13 of the Instituto Histórico e Geográfico de São João del-Rei.

In August 2019, the institute held a roundtable for the bicentenary of Xavier's birth. Teachers from the conservatory discussed his life and music, and students performed during the program. The event was organized with the conservatory, the municipal library, and the education and culture departments of São João del-Rei.

=== Modern editions, recordings, and scholarship ===
In São João del-Rei, Matinas do Natal is performed each year by the city's two longstanding musical ensembles, the Orquestra Lira Sanjoanense and the Orquestra Ribeiro Bastos. During Holy Week, Xavier's repertory includes the Ofício de Ramos, the Ofícios de Trevas, the Tratos e Bradados, and the Ofício da Ressurreição. Adoramus te Christe and Popule meus are sung during the Feast of Our Lord of the Steps, while Adoramus te Christe is also used for the Adoration of the Cross on Good Friday.

In 1979, the Orquestra Ribeiro Bastos recorded Matinas do Natal at the Church of Our Lady of Mount Carmel in São João del-Rei. José Maria Neves conducted the performance, which was issued by Tacape in its Memória Musical series. The orchestra recorded more of Xavier's music in 1980 for an album devoted to the Novena of Our Lady of Mount Carmel.

The Ofício de Trevas was recorded in two CD volumes conducted by Marcelo Ramos. Volume I, released in 2004, was performed by the Orquestra Sinfônica de Minas Gerais and the Coral Lírico do Palácio das Artes. Volume II followed in 2005 with the Orquestra e Coro dos Inconfidentes. It contains music for Holy Saturday and Easter morning. Carol A. Hess reviewed the second volume in the Journal of the Society for American Music in 2011.

The titles printed on the two CDs do not always match Xavier's autograph scores. (Note: An autograph score is a manuscript written in the composer's own hand.) The piece labeled Ofício de Quinta-feira Santa on Volume I bears the title Ofício de Quarta-feira de Trevas in the autograph. The work called Matinas de Sábado Santo on Volume II is Xavier's Ofício de Sexta-feira Santa. These differences follow the days on which the works are performed in São João del-Rei, but the CD booklets do not explain the change in names.

The Projeto de Reedição do Acervo da Orquestra Ribeiro Bastos began preparing new performance material in 2014. Xavier's three Tenebrae offices and his Laudes de Endoenças (Note: Endoenças is an older Portuguese name for the Holy Thursday observances. The title refers to the lauds sung for that part of Holy Week.) were the project's first editions based directly on autograph scores. Work on the integrated scores began in 2015 and ended in 2016. The editors placed the full Latin ceremony beside the music so that the conductor, singers, and instrumentalists could follow the service from a single set of materials.

The completed edition contained 416 pages of score and liturgical text, 1,605 pages of vocal and instrumental parts, and 60 pages of critical notes. The Orquestra Ribeiro Bastos began using it during Holy Week in 2016. The Música Brasilis catalogue provides digital scores of Adoramus te Christe, Matinas do Espírito Santo, Novena de Nossa Senhora da Conceição, Ofício de Quinta-feira Santa, and Ofício de Sexta-feira Santa.

Aureliano Pimentel published a biographical essay on Xavier in the Revista do Arquivo Público Mineiro in 1901. Maria Salomé de Resende Viegas examined the flute solo in the fourth responsory of Matinas do Natal in 2006, with attention to the manuscript, its instrumental writing, and questions faced by performers. Adhemar Campos Neto later catalogued Xavier's writing for flute, clarinet, and piston and examined how the three instruments were combined in his scores. Antonio Carlos Guimarães and Fausto Borém studied the demands that Xavier's flute parts place on performers using instruments built under different nineteenth and twenty-first-century systems.

Modesto Flávio Chagas Fonseca wrote the entry on Xavier for Grove Music Online in 2023. Xavier's music is present across more than 100 Holy Week programs and newspaper notices from São João del-Rei dated between 1884 and 2025.

== See also ==
- Art music in Brazil
- Chronological list of Brazilian classical composers
