= São João del-Rei =

- Municipality
- Municipality of São João del-Rei
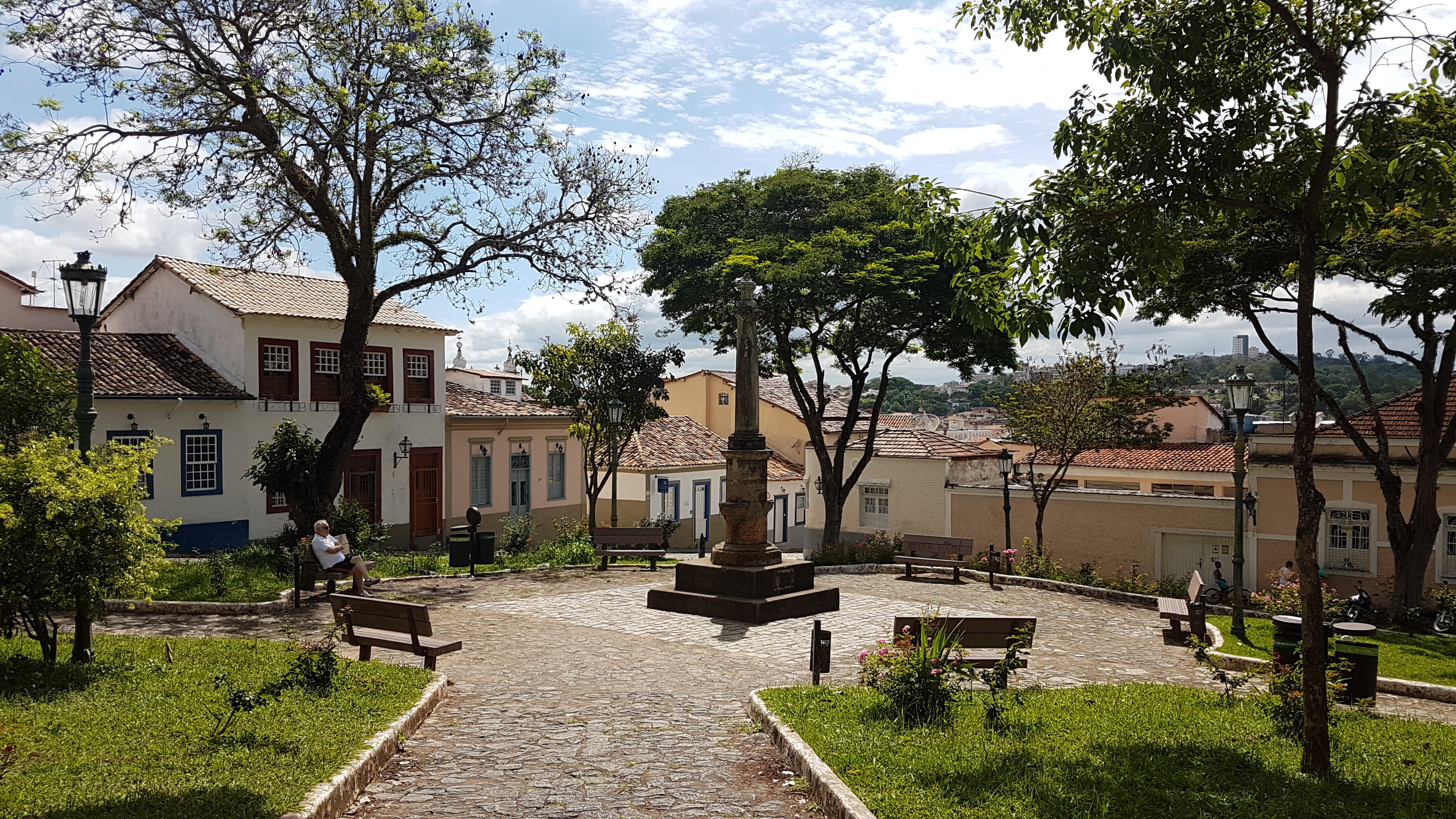
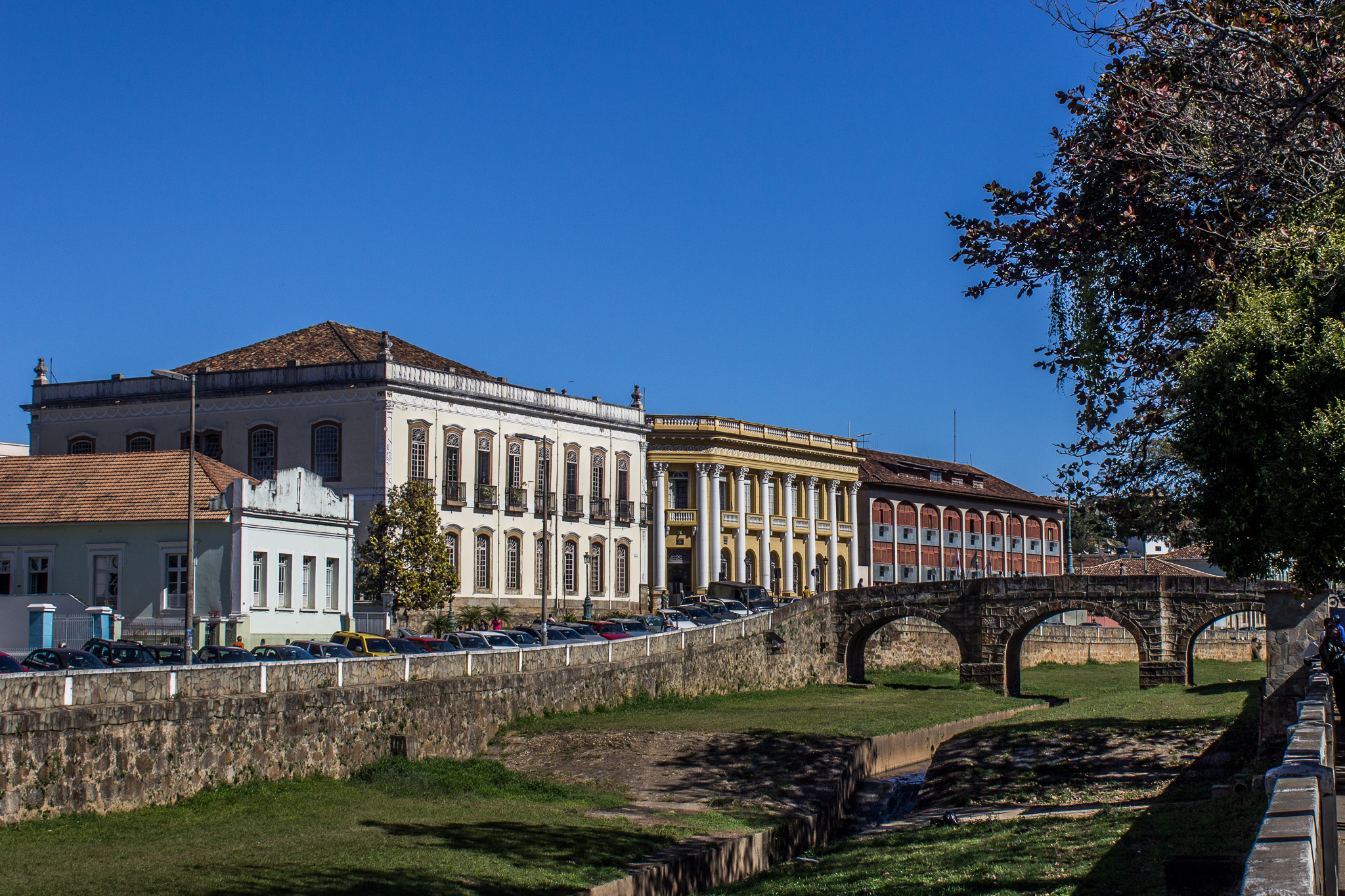
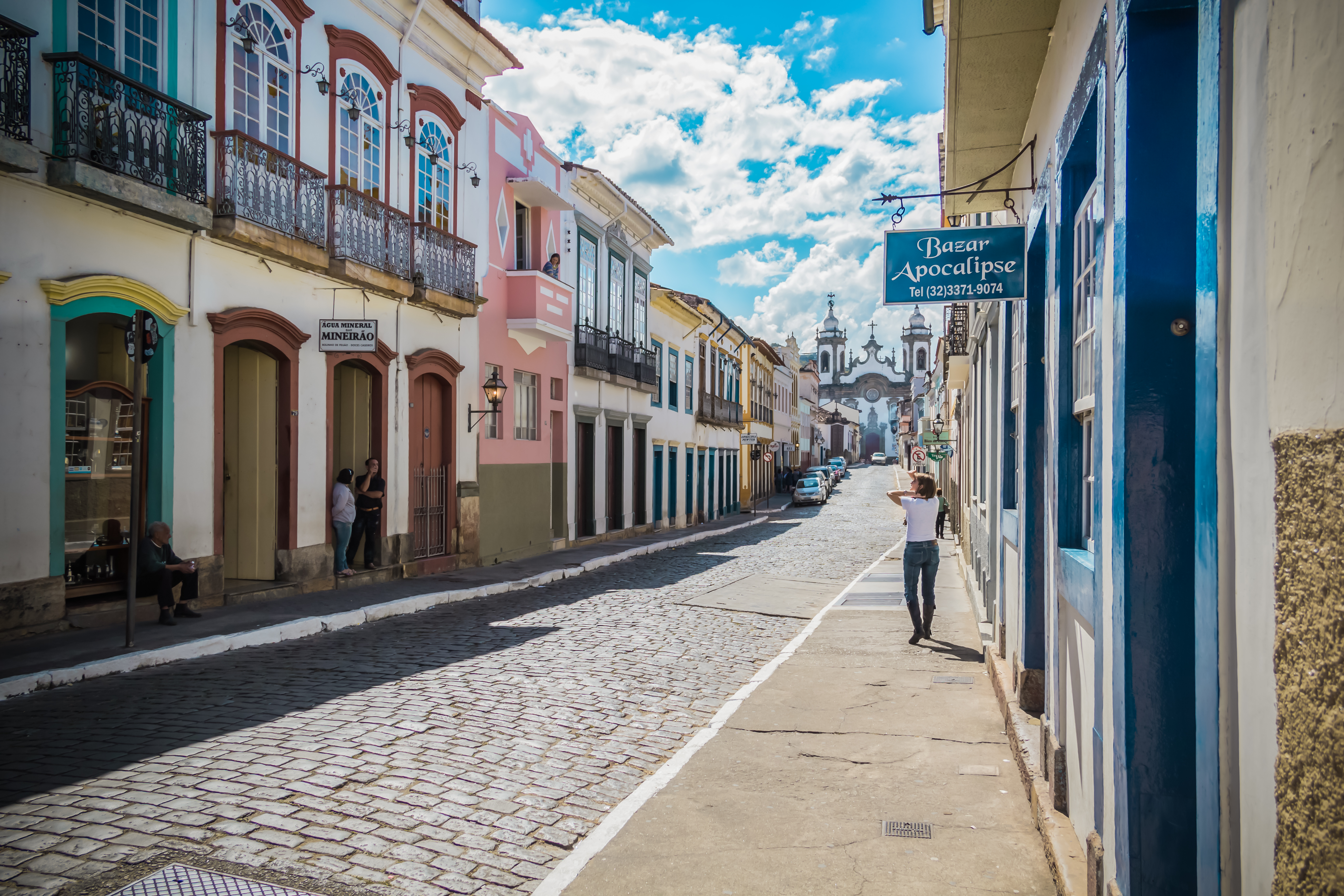
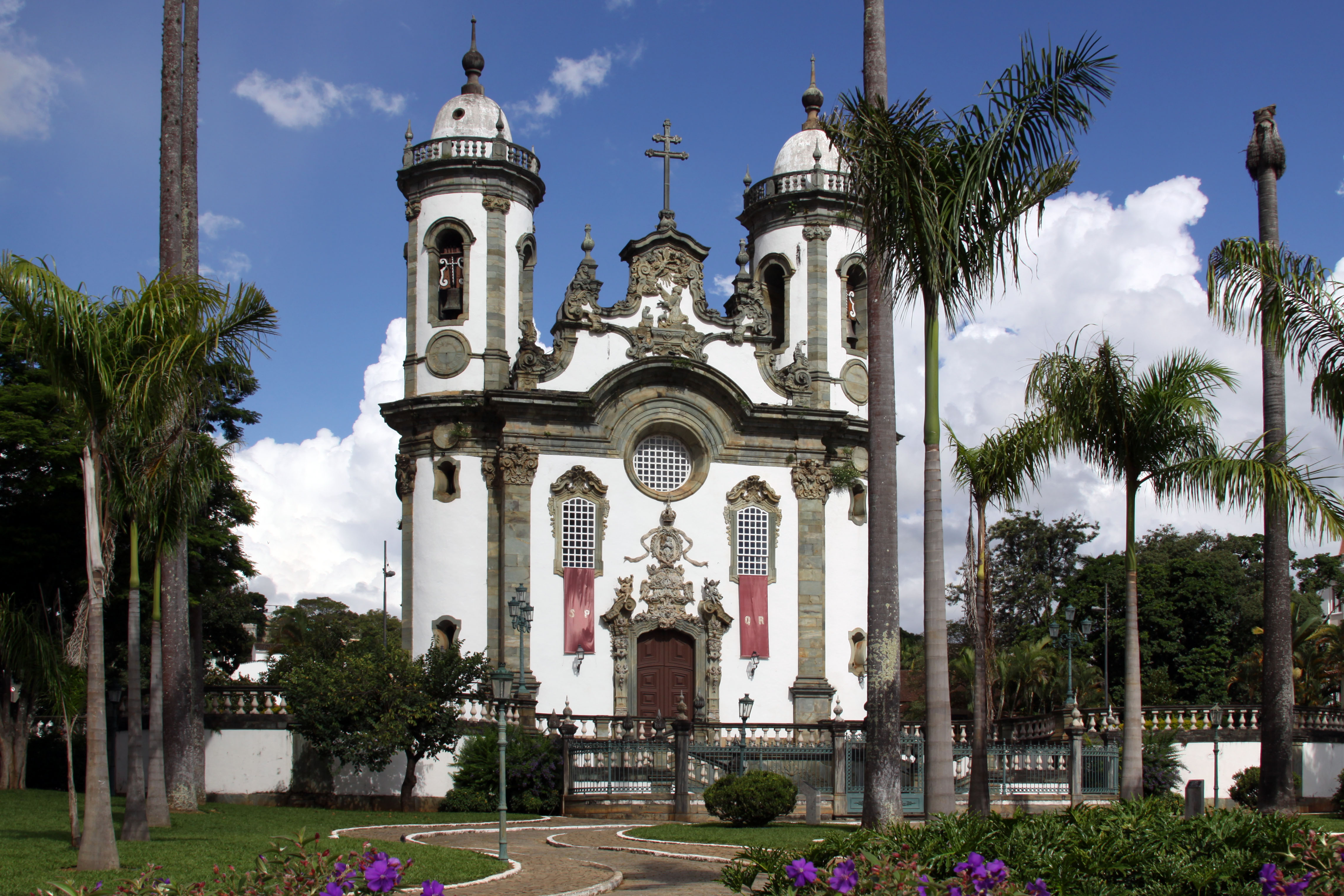
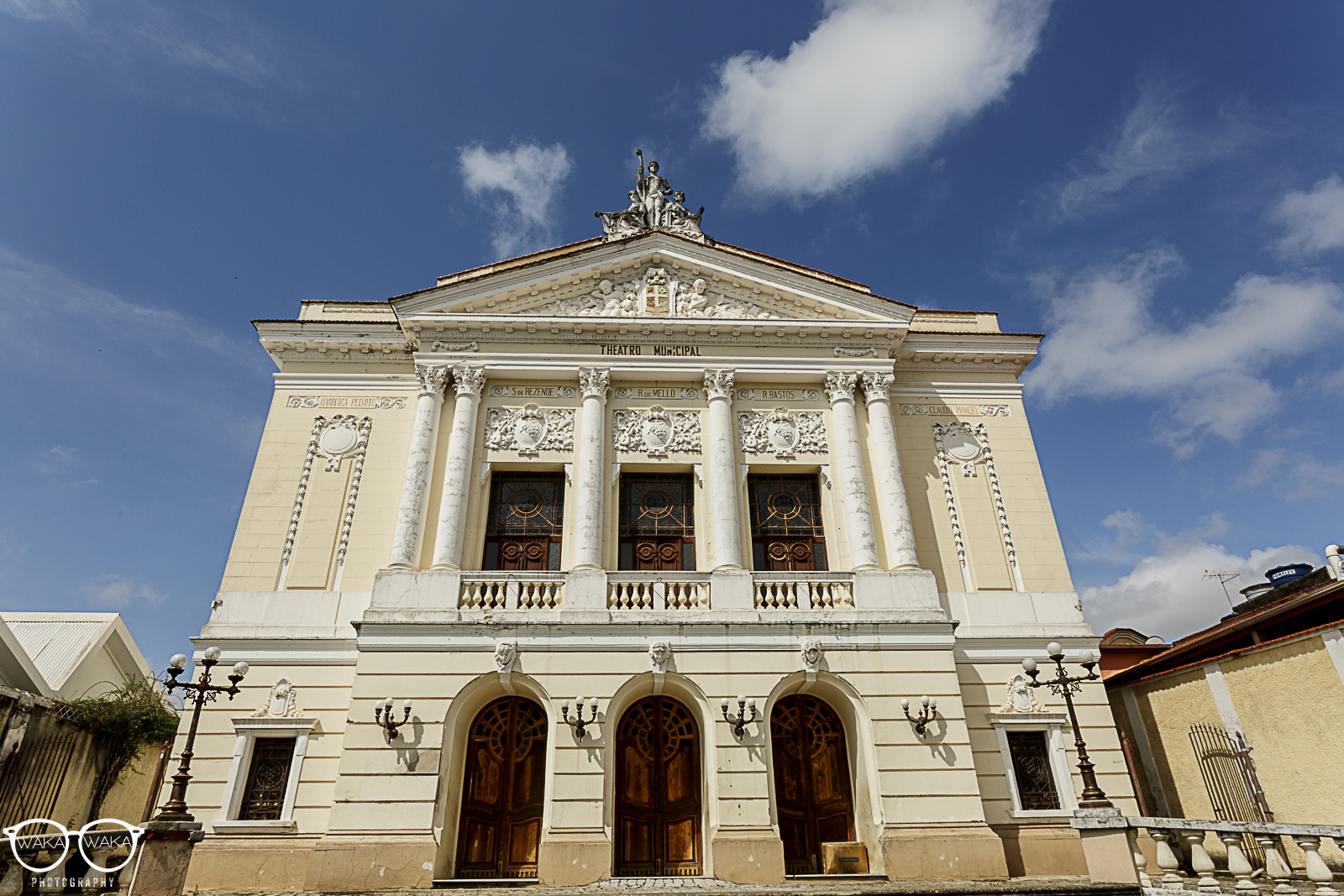

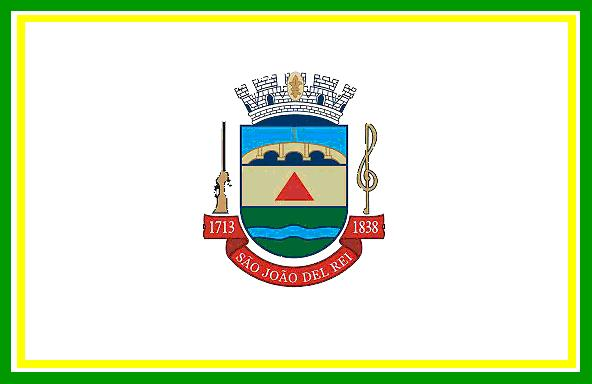
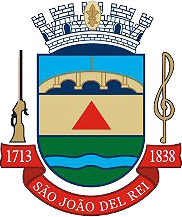
- Flag Coat of arms

- Location in Minas Gerais
- Coordinates: 21°08′09″S 44°15′36″W
- Country: Brazil
- State: Minas Gerais
- Region: Southeast
- Intermediate Region: Barbacena
- Immediate Region: São João del-Rei
- Founded: 8 December 1713

Government
  - Mayor: Nivaldo José de Andrade (UNIÃO)

Area
  - Total: 1,452.002 km^{2} (560.621 sq mi)
- Elevation: 904 m (2,966 ft)

Population (2022 Census)
  - Total: 90,225
  - Estimate (2025): 94,468
  - Density: 62.138/km^{2} (160.94/sq mi)
- Demonym: são-joanense
- Time zone: UTC−3 (BRT)
- Postal Code: 36300-000 to 36319-999
- Area code: +55 32
- HDI (2010): 0.758 – high
- Major airport: São João del-Rei Airport
- Website: saojoaodelrei.mg.gov.br

São João del-Rei (Note: Also spelled São João del Rei or São João del Rey in older references.) is a Brazilian municipality in the state of Minas Gerais. Founded in 1713 in homage to king John V of Portugal, the city is famed for its historic Portuguese colonial architecture. The current population (2025) is estimated at 94,468 inhabitants.

== Geography ==
It is located in the drainage basin of the Rio Grande and its terrain is located in the Mantiqueira mountains. It is a centre for the cities in the south and southeast of Minas Gerais.

The municipality contains part of the Ritápolis National Forest.

According to the modern (2017) geographic classification by Brazil's National Institute of Geography and Statistics (IBGE), the municipality belongs to the Immediate Geographic Region of São João del-Rei, in the Intermediate Geographic Region of Barbacena.

=== Districts ===
The municipality has five rural districts.

- Rio das Mortes
- São Gonçalo do Amarante
- São Miguel do Cajuru
- Emboabas
- São Sebastião da Vitória

== History ==
The city was founded by the bandeirantes; Tomé Portes del-Rei is considered the city's founder. The original small village situated in southern Minas Gerais was created as a staging post on the Estrada Real, a trade route from the coast at Paraty to cities in the central region of Minas Gerais such as Ouro Preto, Mariana, and Conselheiro Lafaiete. Later huge amounts of gold were found near the city itself.

== Culture ==
Today, São João del-Rei is a university town. The campus of the Federal University of São João del-Rei (UFSJ) and a number of other educational institutions are present in the city. A second medical school is to be established at the university.

The city has many famous religious festivals through the year, most of them preserving the way it was celebrated by the time of the foundation, with baroque music and special celebrations that attracts tourists from all over the world, particularly during Holy Week, when the town receives the greatest influx of visitors.

=== Tourism ===
The city is 12 km from Tiradentes. Other historical cities in Minas Gerais are Ouro Preto, Diamantina, Mariana, Congonhas, and Sabará.

=== Cathedrals and churches ===
- Catedral Basílica Nossa Senhora do Pilar (1721), a Minor Basilica, dedicated to Our Lady of the Pillar, the episcopal seat of the Roman Catholic Diocese of São João del Rei.
- Our Lady of Rosário (1720)
- Our Lady of Carmo (1733)
- Our Lady of Mercês e Bonfim (1769)
- São Francisco de Assis (1774)
- Santo Antônio (Senhor dos Montes neighborhood)
- Nossa Senhora da Piedade do Bom Despacho

== Sports ==
The city is home to Athletic Club (1909), an association football team that plays in the Second Division of Campeonato Mineiro and the Second Division of the Brazilian National Championship.

== Notable people ==
=== Folk ===
- Tiradentes, national hero

=== Sports ===
- Thiago Galhardo, association football professional player

=== Entrepreneur ===
- Nadir Dias de Figueiredo, glass industrialist

=== Writers ===
- Otto Lara Resende, writer (chronicler)
- Bárbara Heliodora, writer and thinker from Inconfidência Mineira

=== Music ===
- Chico Lobo, composer of viola caipira

=== Politicians ===
- Tancredo Neves, president-elect of Brazil (never took office)
- Manuel Jacinto Nogueira da Gama, Imperial senator

=== Catholic Church ===
- Blessed Francisca de Paula de Jesus, Afro-Brazilian Catholic laywoman
- Antônio de Almeida Lustosa, Archbishop of Fortaleza, Servant of God
- Lucas Moreira Neves, Catholic cardinal
- Miguel Afonso de Andrade Leite, Catholic priest, Servant of God
- José Maria Xavier, sacred music composer and Catholic priest

== Estrada de Ferro Oeste de Minas ==
São João del-Rei was an important station on the Estrada de Ferro Oeste de Minas, a narrow gauge railway characterised by woodburning steam locomotives, and the location of a major roundhouse. The station and surrounding facilities have been turned into Brazil's largest railway museum, and a tourist railway operates from the station to the well preserved colonial town of Tiradentes.

== Climate ==
Climate data for São João del-Rei (1981–2010 normals, extremes 1961–present)
Month	Jan	Feb	Mar	Apr	May	Jun	Jul	Aug	Sep	Oct	Nov	Dec	Year
Record high °C (°F)	36.4 (97.5)	34.4 (93.9)	33.9 (93.0)	31.8 (89.2)	31.6 (88.9)	29.8 (85.6)	30.1 (86.2)	33.7 (92.7)	36.9 (98.4)	37.8 (100.0)	37.6 (99.7)	34.1 (93.4)	37.8 (100.0)
Mean daily maximum °C (°F)	28.1 (82.6)	28.5 (83.3)	27.7 (81.9)	27.1 (80.8)	24.7 (76.5)	23.9 (75.0)	23.7 (74.7)	25.3 (77.5)	25.9 (78.6)	27.0 (80.6)	27.0 (80.6)	27.1 (80.8)	26.3 (79.3)
Daily mean °C (°F)	21.8 (71.2)	21.9 (71.4)	21.1 (70.0)	20.0 (68.0)	17.4 (63.3)	15.9 (60.6)	15.7 (60.3)	16.8 (62.2)	18.6 (65.5)	20.1 (68.2)	20.7 (69.3)	21.1 (70.0)	19.3 (66.7)
Mean daily minimum °C (°F)	17.2 (63.0)	17.2 (63.0)	16.6 (61.9)	15.1 (59.2)	12.4 (54.3)	10.4 (50.7)	10.1 (50.2)	10.8 (51.4)	13.2 (55.8)	15.0 (59.0)	16.1 (61.0)	16.7 (62.1)	14.2 (57.6)
Record low °C (°F)	10.0 (50.0)	10.7 (51.3)	9.6 (49.3)	5.0 (41.0)	3.0 (37.4)	1.0 (33.8)	0.4 (32.7)	1.4 (34.5)	1.4 (34.5)	5.6 (42.1)	6.9 (44.4)	7.8 (46.0)	0.4 (32.7)
Average precipitation mm (inches)	320.4 (12.61)	183.8 (7.24)	192.9 (7.59)	65.1 (2.56)	41.0 (1.61)	15.1 (0.59)	11.5 (0.45)	22.4 (0.88)	78.3 (3.08)	129.2 (5.09)	195.5 (7.70)	326.8 (12.87)	1,582 (62.28)
Average precipitation days (≥ 1.0 mm)	17	12	11	6	4	2	2	3	6	9	13	18	103
Average relative humidity (%)	77	75.2	77.1	75.9	75.8	74.1	71.1	66.9	69.3	70.9	74.3	77.3	73.7
Mean monthly sunshine hours	187.6	199.0	195.7	179.9	176.2	163.4	179.8	206.8	184.2	196.1	155.8	166.2	2,190.7
Source: Instituto Nacional de Meteorologia

== See also ==
- List of municipalities in Minas Gerais
