= Diocese of Leopoldina =

Catholic ecclesiastical territory

Coordinates: 21.5322°S 42.6431°W

Diocese of Leopoldina Dioecesis Leopoldinensis

Catholic
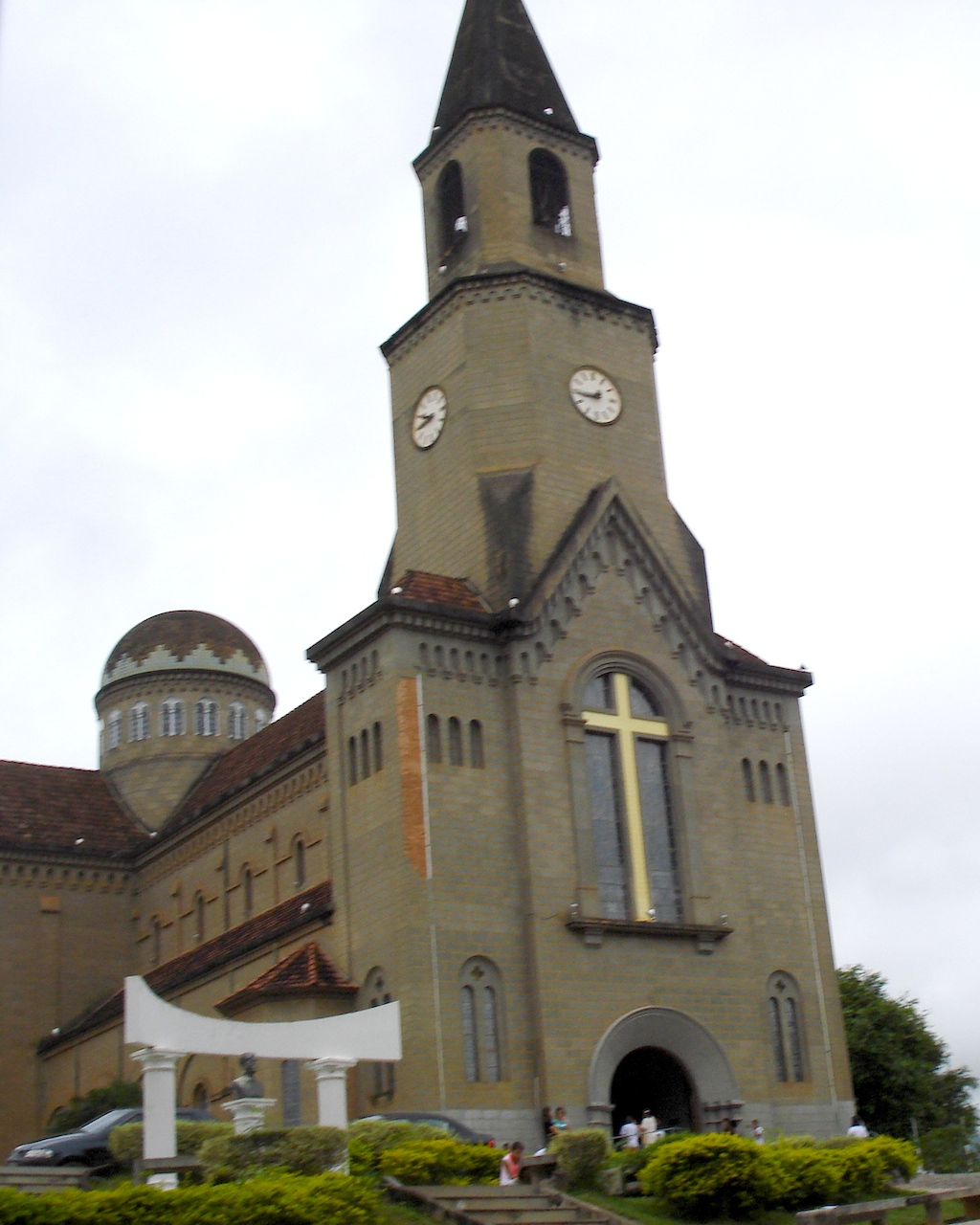
- Cathedral of St. Sebastian

Location
- Country: Brazil
- Ecclesiastical province: Juiz de Fora

Statistics
- Area: 8,491 km^{2} (3,278 sq mi)
- Population: Total; Catholics: (as of 2004); 529,154; 396,865 (75.0%)

Information
- Rite: Latin Rite
- Established: 8 March 1942 (84 years ago)
- Cathedral: Catedral São Sebastião

Current leadership
- Pope: Leo XIV
- Bishop: Edson José Oriolo dos Santos
- Metropolitan Archbishop: Gil Antônio Moreira

The Roman Catholic Diocese of Leopoldina (Latin: Dioecesis Leopoldinensis) is a diocese located in the city of Leopoldina in the ecclesiastical province of Juiz de Fora in Brazil.

== History ==
- March 8, 1942: Established as Diocese of Leopoldina from the Diocese of Juiz de Fora and Metropolitan Archdiocese of Mariana

== Bishops ==
- Edson José Oriolo dos Santos (30 October 2019)
- José Eudes Campos do Nascimento (2012.06.27 - 2018.12.12), appointed Bishop of São João del Rei, Minas Gerais
- Dario Campos, O.F.M. (2004.06.23 – 2011.04.27), appointed Bishop of Cachoeiro do Itapemirim, Espirito Santo; future Archbishop
- Célio de Oliveira Goulart, O.F.M. (1998.06.24 – 2003.07.09), appointed Bishop of Cachoeiro do Itapemirim, Espirito Santo
- Ricardo Pedro Chaves Pinto Filho, O. Praem. (1990.03.14 – 1996.10.16), appointed Archbishop of Pouso Alegre, Minas Gerais
- Sebastião Roque Rabelo Mendes (1985.08.05 – 1989.05.10)
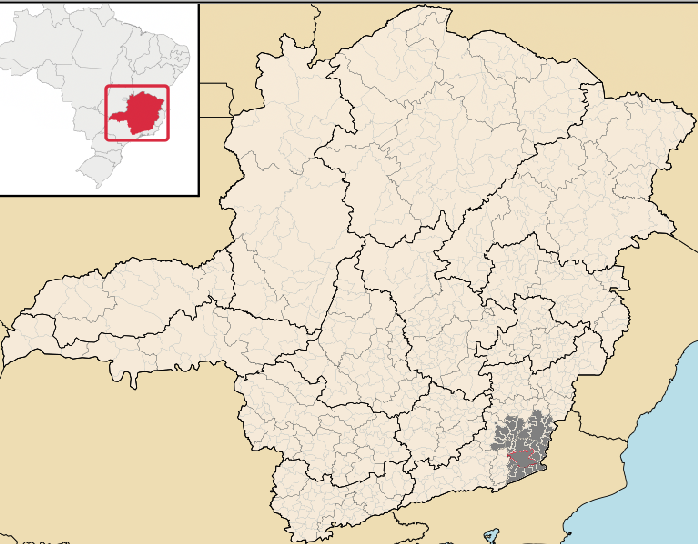
- Diocese of Leopoldina.
  Geraldo Ferreira Reis (1961.06.16 – 1985.08.05)
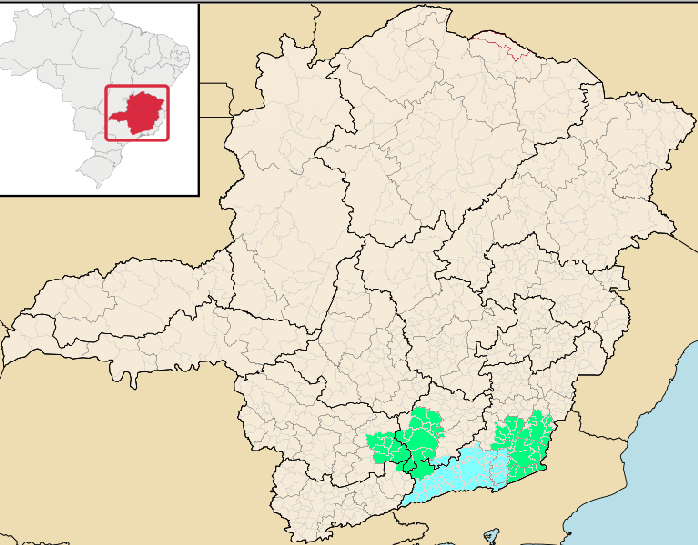
- Ecclesiastical Province of Juiz de Fora.
  Delfim Ribeiro Guedes (1943.06.26 – 1960.07.23), appointed Bishop of São João del Rei, Minas Gerais
