= Cathedral Basilica of Our Lady of the Pillar, São João del Rei =

Coordinates: 21.1352°S 44.2619°W

Cathedral Basilica of Our Lady of the Pillar
- Catedral Basílica Nossa Sehora do Pilar
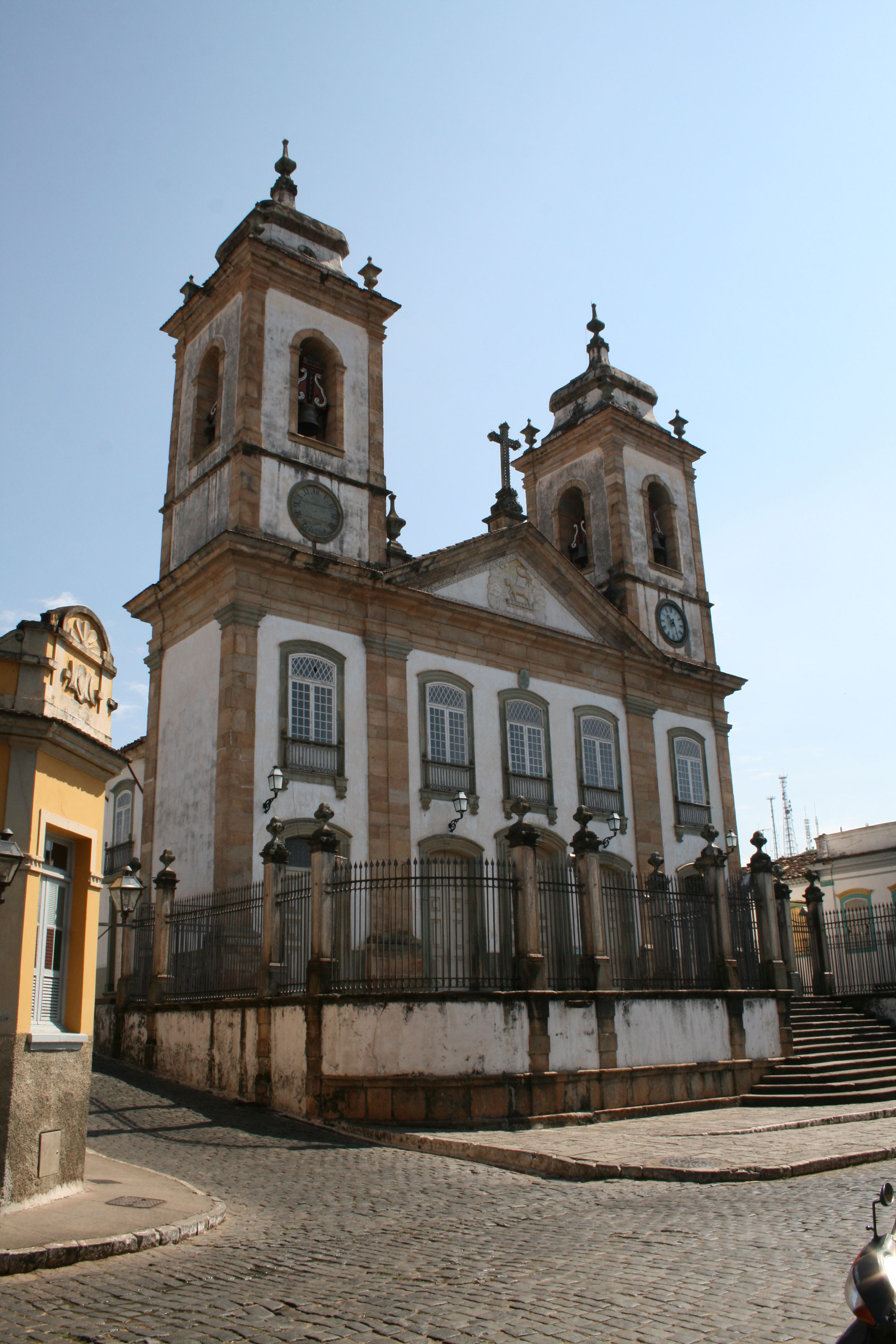
- Cathedral Basilica of Our Lady of the Pillar
- Location: São João del-Rei
- Country: Brazil
- Denomination: Roman Catholic Church

Architecture
- Style: Baroque

Administration
- Province: Juiz de Fora
- Archdiocese: Juiz de Fora
- Diocese: São João del Rei

National Historic Heritage of Brazil
- Designated: 1938
- Reference no.: 68

The Cathedral Basilica of Our Lady of the Pillar (Portuguese: Catedral Basílica Nossa Sehora do Pilar), also known as the São João del Rei Cathedral, is a Roman Catholic Marian Pontifical shrine in São João del-Rei, Minas Gerais, Brazil. It is a great representative of Brazilian colonial art, which contains a rich decoration in gold, paintings and statues, being under the protection of the Institute of National Artistic Patrimony of Brazil (IPHAN). The cathedral is the seat of the Roman Catholic Diocese of São João del Rei (established in 1960).

Pope Pius XII crowned the venerated Marian image within the shrine on 12 October 1954. Pope Paul VI issued a Pontifical decree Religione almae which raised the shrine to the status of Minor Basilica on 24 September 1964.

== History ==
The history of the basilica is closely linked to the history of the city and begins at the beginning of the 18th century, when there was built between 1703 and 1704 a chapel of mud covered in straw at the top of the Morro da Forca dedicated to the Virgin of the Pillar. Around this chapel, the first of the city, formed a camp. In 1709 the chapel was burned down during the Emboabas War.

A few years later the Brotherhood of the Blessed Sacrament, founded in 1711 and reserved for the wealthy white men of the town, wanted to erect a new church to replace the original chapel that was destroyed, but placing it in the center of the town. The license for the construction was granted the 12 of September 1721.

== Protected status ==
The Cathedral Basilica of Our Lady of the Pillar was listed as a historic structure by the National Institute of Historic and Artistic Heritage in 1938. It is listed in the Book of Historical Works # 68.

== See also ==
- Roman Catholicism in Brazil
- Our Lady of the Pillar

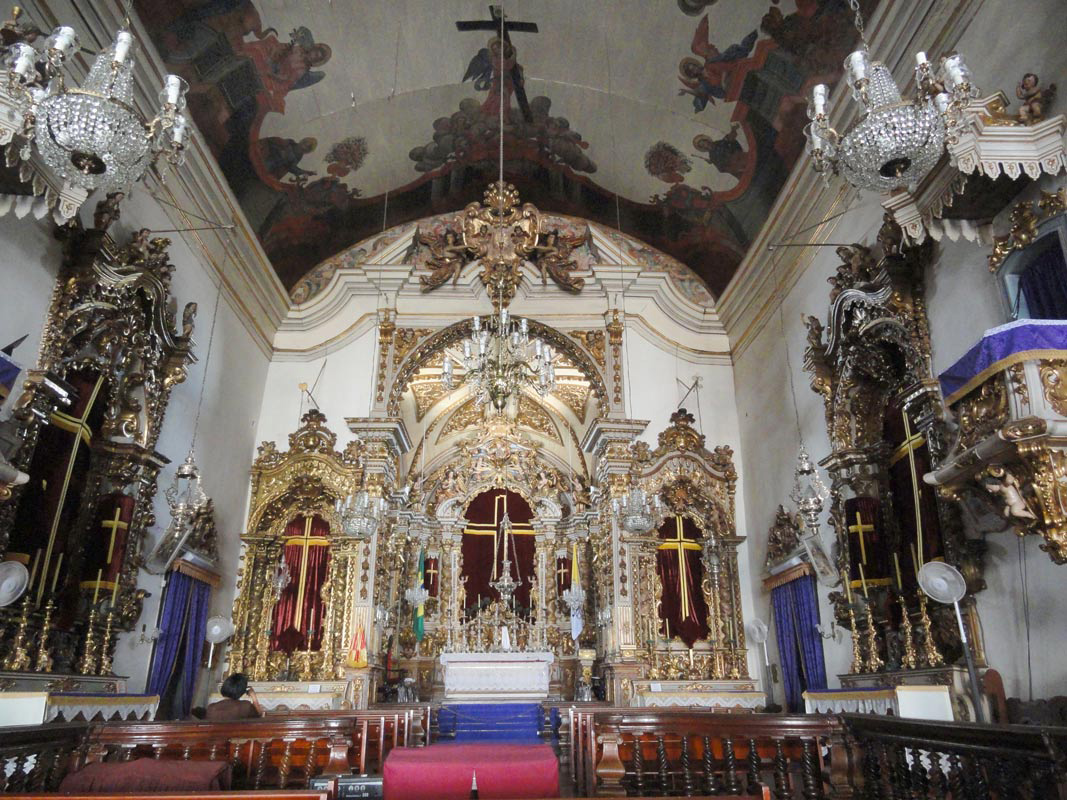
Internal view
