= José Eudes Campos do Nascimento =

Brazilian priest

- Bishop of São João del Rei
- Church: Catholic Church
- Diocese: Diocese of São João del Rei
- Appointed: 12 December 2018
- Predecessor: Célio de Oliveira Goulart
- Previous post: Bishop of Leopoldina (2012-2018)

Orders
- Ordination: As Deacon: 15 August 1994; As Priest: 22 April 1995 by Luciano Mendes de Almeida
- Consecration: 15 September 2012 by Geraldo Lyrio Rocha

Personal details
- Born: 30 April 1966 (age 60) Barbacena, Minas Gerais, United States of Brazil

José Eudes Campos do Nascimento (born April 30, 1966, in Barbacena) is the bishop of the Diocese of São João del Rei. He was appointed in 2019.
