= Ricardo Pedro Chaves Pinto Filho =

Brazilian Roman Catholic archbishop (1938–2018)

Ricardo Pedro Chaves Pinto Filho O.Praem
- Archbishop of Pouso Alegre
- Church: Catholic Church
- Archdiocese: Archdiocese of Pouso Alegre
- In office: 16 October 1996 – 28 May 2014
- Predecessor: Giovanni Bergese
- Successor: José Luiz Majella Delgado
- Previous post: Bishop of Leopoldina (1990-1996)

Orders
- Ordination: 29 June 1967 by José Alves de Sá Trindade
- Consecration: 21 April 1990 by Serafim Fernandes de Araújo

Personal details
- Born: 6 August 1938 Capelinha, Minas Gerais, Republic of the United States of Brazil
- Died: 1 April 2018 (aged 79) Pouso Alegre, Minas Gerais, Brazil

Ricardo Pedro Chaves Pinto Filho (6 August 1938 – 1 April 2018) was a Roman Catholic archbishop.

Chaves Pinto Filho was born in Brazil. He was ordained to the priesthood in 1967. Chaves served as bishop of the Roman Catholic Diocese of Leopoldina, Brazil, from 1990 to 1996. He then served as archbishop of the Roman Catholic Archdiocese of Pouso Alegre, Brazil, from 1990 to 2014.
