= Piracema, Minas Gerais =

Town and municipality in the state of Minas Gerais, Brazil

Coordinates: 20.5078°S 44.4828°W

- Municipality
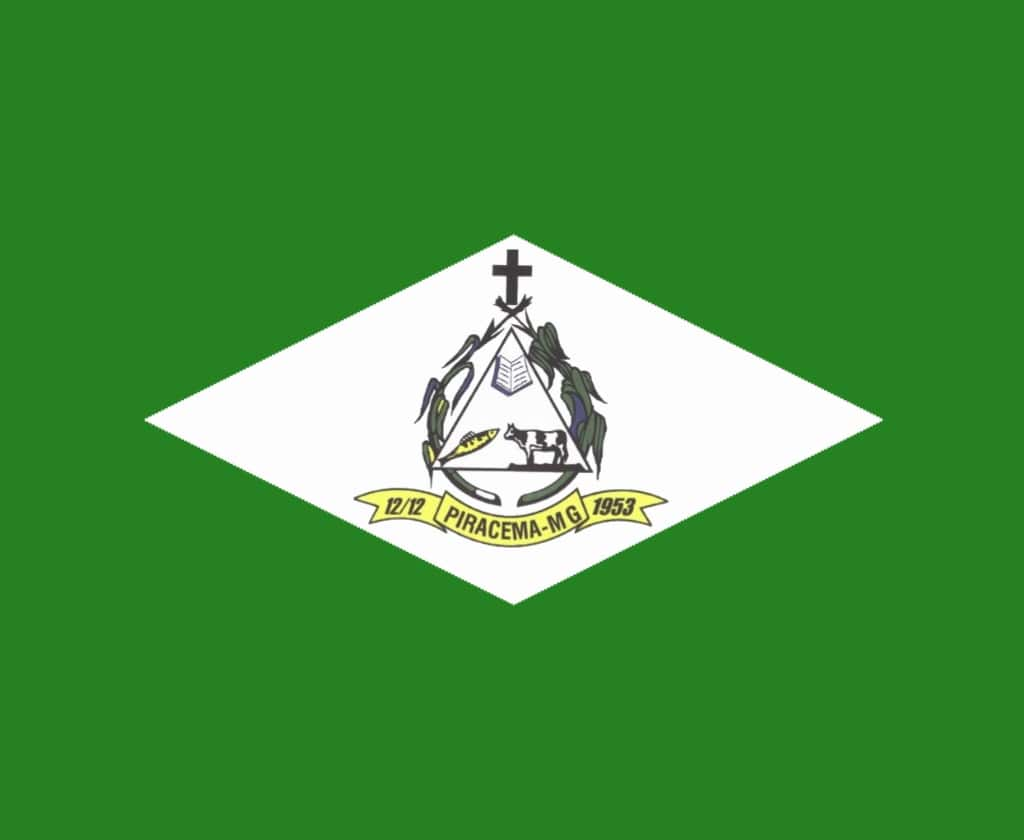
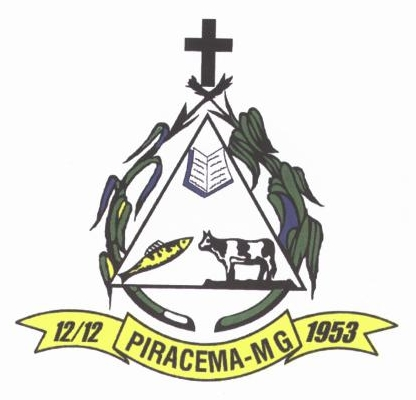
- Flag Coat of arms
- Interactive map of Piracema, Minas Gerais
- Country: Brazil
- State: Minas Gerais
- Region: Southeast

Population (2022 Census)
  - Total: 6,700
  - Estimate (2025): 6,905
- Time zone: UTC−3 (BRT)

Location of Piracema

Piracema is a municipality in the state of Minas Gerais in the Southeast region of Brazil. As of 2025, the estimated population was 6,905.

== See also ==
- List of municipalities in Minas Gerais
