= Waldemar Chaves de Araújo =

- Bishop Emeritus of São João del Rei
- Church: Catholic Church
- Diocese: Diocese of São João del Rei
- In office: 26 June 1996 – 26 May 2010
- Predecessor: Antônio Carlos Mesquita
- Successor: Célio de Oliveira Goulart
- Previous post: Bishop of Teófilo Otoni (1989-1996)

Orders
- Ordination: 22 September 1962
- Consecration: 3 February 1990 by Carlo Furno

Personal details
- Born: 23 June 1934 (age 92) Bom Despacho Minas Gerais, United States of Brazil

Waldemar Chaves de Araújo (born in Bom Despacho, Minas Gerais on June 23, 1934) is the bishop emeritus of the Roman Catholic Diocese of São João del Rei. He was bishop from 1996 to 2010, when he retired.
