= Diocese of Teófilo Otoni =

Catholic ecclesiastical territory

Diocese of Teófilo Otoni Dioecesis Otonipolitana Diocese de Teófilo Otoni
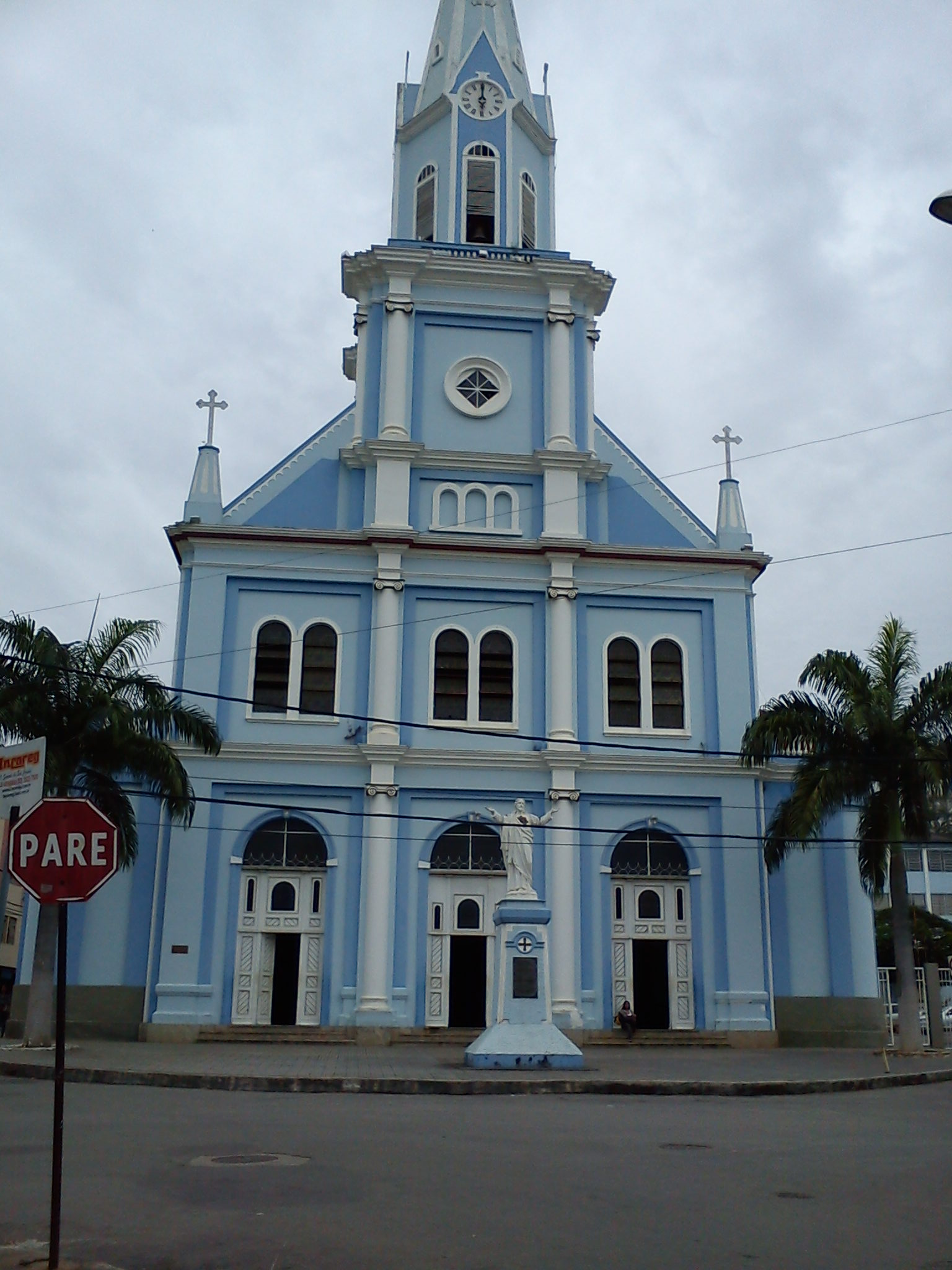
- Cathedral of the Immaculate Conception in Teófilo Otoni in 2011

Location
- Country: Brazil
- Ecclesiastical province: Diamantina
- Metropolitan: Diamantina

Statistics
- Area: 25,376 km^{2} (9,798 sq mi)
- Population: Total; Catholics: (as of 2010); 477,000; 340,000 (71.3%)

Information
- Sui iuris church: Latin Church
- Rite: Roman Rite
- Established: 27 November 1960 (65 years ago)
- Cathedral: Cathedral of the Immaculate Conception in Teófilo Otoni

Current leadership
- Pope: Leo XIV
- Bishop: Sede vacante
- Metropolitan Archbishop: Darci José Nicioli
- Bishops emeritus: Bishop Diogo Reesink, O.F.M.

The Roman Catholic Diocese of Teófilo Otoni (Latin: Dioecesis Otonipolitana) is a diocese located in the city of Teófilo Otoni in the ecclesiastical province of Diamantina in Brazil.

== History ==
- November 27, 1960: Established as Diocese of Teófilo Otoni from the Diocese of Araçuaí

== Bishops ==
- Bishops of Teófilo Otoni, in reverse chronological order
  - Bishop Aloísio Jorge Pena Vitral (2009.11.25 - 2017.10.20), appointed Bishop of Sete Lagoas, Minas Gerais
  - Bishop Diogo Reesink, O.F.M. (1998.03.25 – 2009.11.25)
  - Bishop Waldemar Chaves de Araújo (1989.11.18 – 1996.06.26), appointed Bishop of São João del Rei, Minas Gerais
  - Bishop Fernando Antônio Figueiredo, O.F.M. (1985.08.03 – 1989.03.15), appointed Bishop of Santo Amaro, São Paulo
  - Bishop Quirino Adolfo Schmitz, O.F.M. (1960.12.22 – 1985.08.03)

=== Coadjutor bishop ===
- Fernando Antônio Figueiredo (1984-1985), O.F.M.

=== Auxiliary bishops ===
- Antônio Eliseu Zuqueto, O.F.M. Cap. (1980-1983), appointed Bishop of Teixeira de Freitas-Caravelas, Bahia
- Fernando Antônio Figueiredo, O.F.M. (1984), appointed Coadjutor here
