= Diocese of Itaguaí =

Catholic ecclesiastical territory

Coordinates: 22.8692°S 43.7786°W

Diocese of Itaguaí Dioecesis Itaguaiensis

Catholic
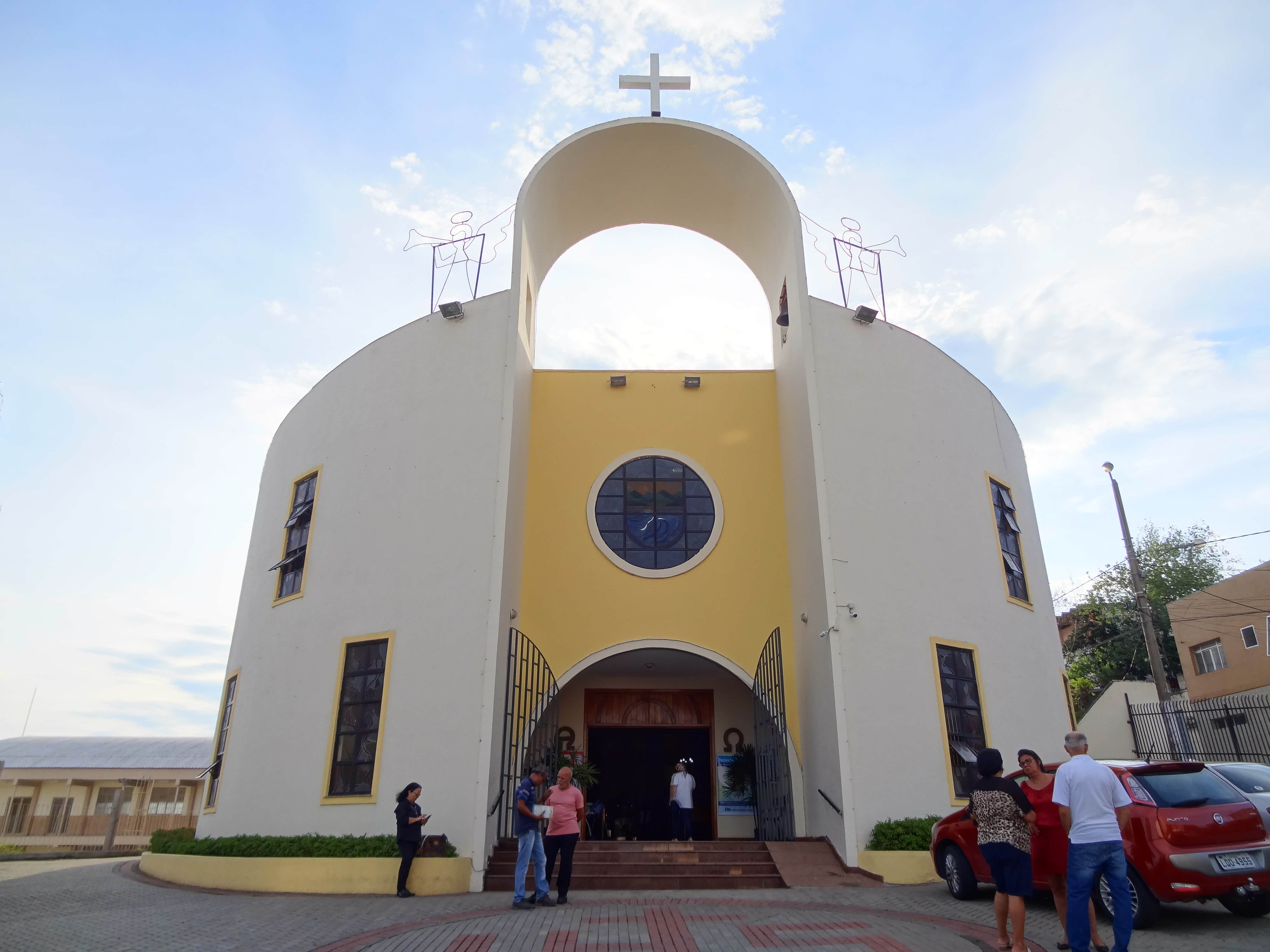
- St Francis Xavier Cathedral in 2017

Location
- Country: Brazil
- Ecclesiastical province: São Sebastião do Rio de Janeiro

Statistics
- Area: 2,549 km^{2} (984 sq mi)
- Population: Total; Catholics: (as of 2004); 358,000; 240,000 (67.0%)

Information
- Denomination: Catholic Church
- Rite: Latin Rite
- Established: 14 March 1980 (46 years ago)
- Cathedral: Catedral São Francisco Xavier

Current leadership
- Pope: Leo XIV
- Bishop: Paulo Celso Dias do Nascimento
- Metropolitan Archbishop: Orani João Tempesta, OCist
- Bishops emeritus: José Ubiratan Lopes, OFMCap

The Roman Catholic Diocese of Itaguaí (Latin: Dioecesis Itaguaiensis) is located in the ecclesiastical province of São Sebastião do Rio de Janeiro in Brazil.

== History ==
14 March 1980: Established as Diocese of Itaguaí from the Diocese of Barra do Piraí–Volta Redonda and Diocese of Nova Iguaçu

== Leadership ==
- Bishops of Itaguaí (Roman rite)
  - Vital João Geraldo Wilderink, OCarm (1980.04.21 – 1998.07.08)
  - José Ubiratan Lopes, OFMCap (1999.11.17 – 2023.04.19)
  - Paulo Celso Dias do Nascimento (2023.04.19 – Present)
