= 2022 Petrópolis floods =

Natural disaster in Petrópolis, Rio de Janeiro

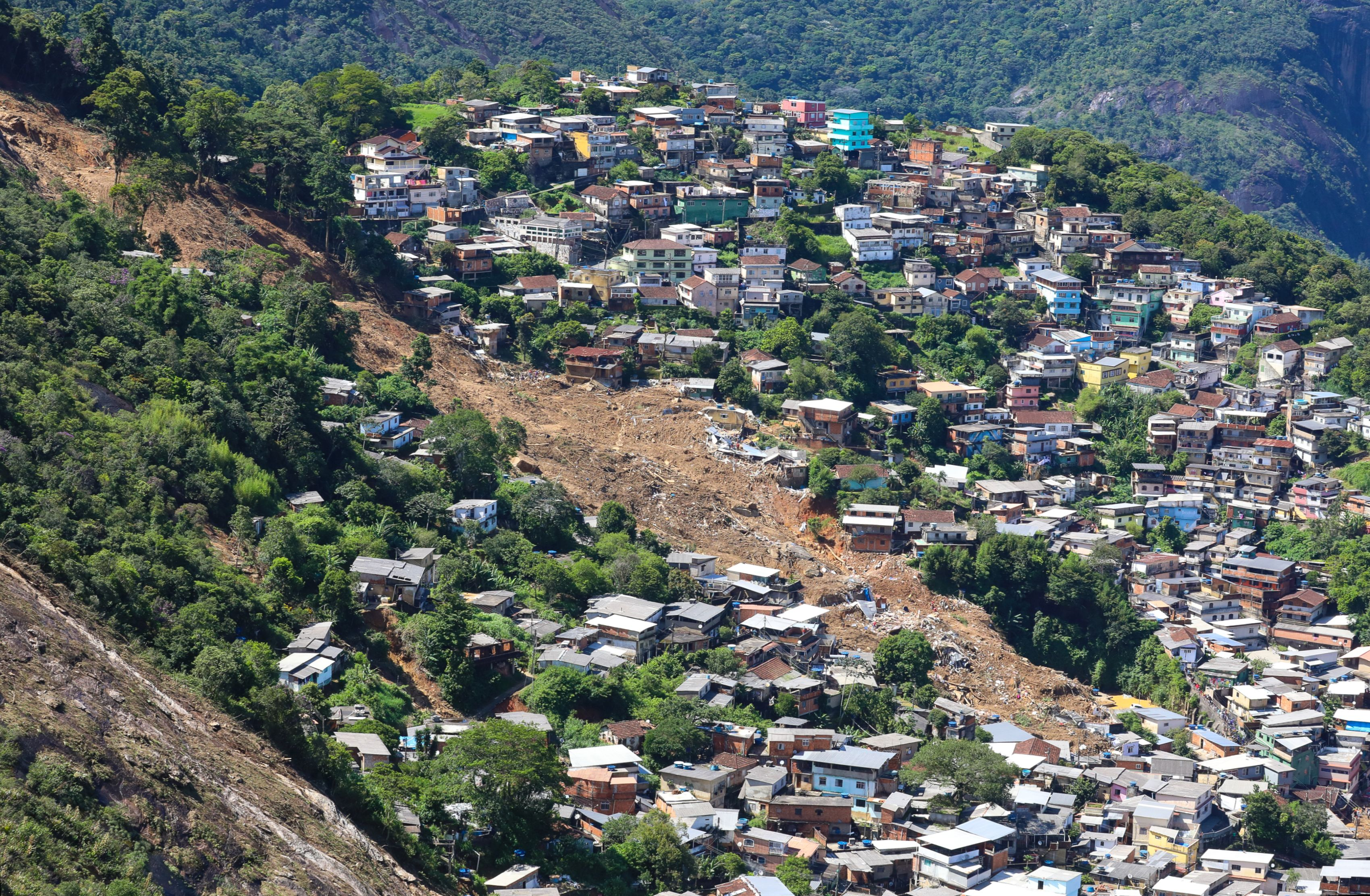
- Aerial view of Petrópolis, Brazil after the floods ravaged the city
- Date: February 15, 2022
- Location: Petrópolis, Rio de Janeiro, Brazil
- Deaths: 231
- Missing: 5
- Property damage: 1 billion R$ ($193.8 million USD)

On 15 February 2022, intense rainfall in Petrópolis, Rio de Janeiro, Brazil caused mudslides and flooding that destroyed parts of the city. At least 231 people died in the disaster.

== Background ==
Petrópolis is a popular tourist city in Brazil, and as it expanded, its poorer residents built upon the nearby mountainsides. This led to deforestation and poor drainage in these areas of the city. From 2007 to 2010 geologists carried out a number of studies and issued reports and landslide risk map for the Quitandinha district, highlighting the most vulnerable areas of the municipality. These findings should have been disseminated throughout Petropolis but, due to insufficient funding, this did not happen. Additionally, the local authorities of Petrópolis ordered a survey in 2017 and identified 15,240 houses with a high risk of being destroyed due to heavy rainfalls, which covered about 18% of the city. The city, however, was unable to act on this report.

The National Natural Disaster Alert Monitoring Center (Cemaden) issued an alert on the magnitude of the storm two days before the floods on 15 February. According to specialists, the warning should have prompted the authorities to mobilize to evacuate the residents. Despite the intensity of the tragedy that would be drawn a few hours later, this alert was issued in a classification of "moderate risk of landslides".

== Event ==
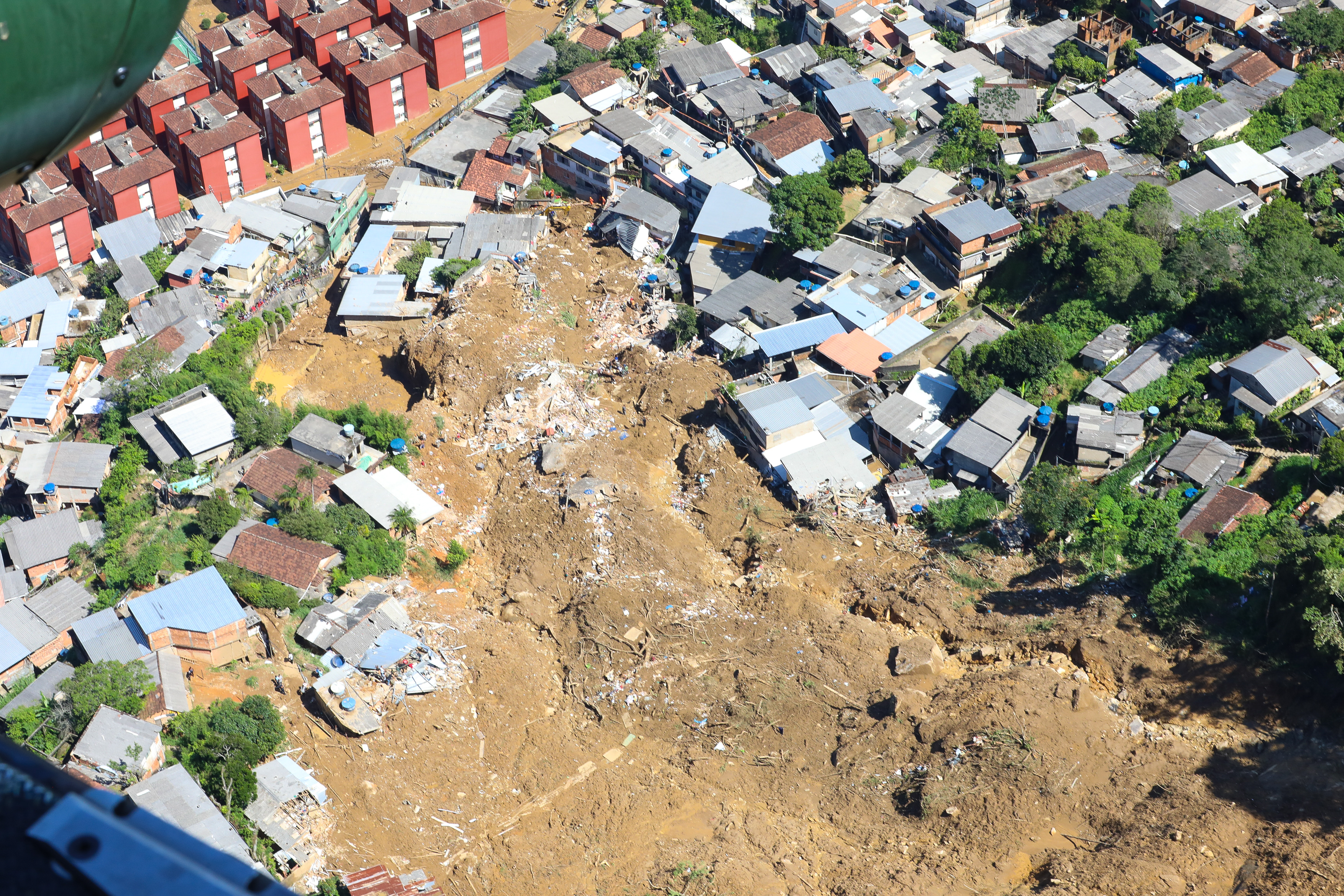
An example of the mudslides as viewed on 18 February

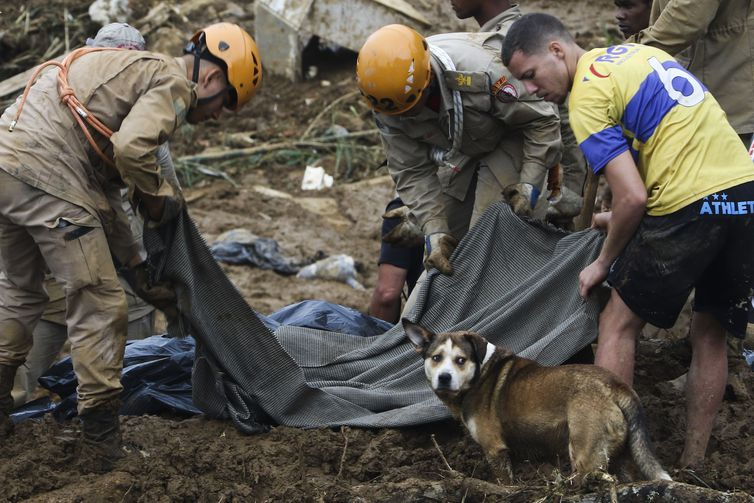
First responders in a rescue operation

On February 15, 2022, the city of Petrópolis received an unusually high amount of rain within three hours, 258 millimetres (10.2 in). This was more than the prior 30 days combined, and the worst the city had seen since 1932. According to Cemaden, of the rain recorded during that day, 250 mm (9.8 in) was recorded between 4:20pm and 7:20pm. The climatological normal for the month of February was 185 millimetres (7.3 in). It was the biggest storm in the history of Petrópolis, since measurements began in 1932. The previous record had occurred on August 20, 1952, when it rained 168.2 mm (6.62 in) in 24 hours.

The high level of precipitation caused flooding within the city as well as destabilized the mountainside, causing mudslides. Videos of the disaster were widely shared on social media, showing cars and houses being dragged by landslides. By February 21, the death toll reached 176, including at least 27 children and teenagers. As of February 28, the death toll has risen to 231, with 5 people still missing. This event is the deadliest flood and mudslide in Petrópolis' history, exceeding the 1988 event which left 171 dead.

== Impacts ==
The damages from the floods and mudslides exceeded 1 billion Brazilian reals when considering reconstruction costs. The estimated loss is 665 million reals from the municipality's gross domestic product (GDP), equivalent to 2%, in data that considers only the direct impact. On top of that, over 78 million reals worth of goods were damaged.

== Reactions ==
=== Brazil ===
==== Federal Government ====
President Jair Bolsonaro, who was visiting Russia and Hungary, contacted the Minister of Regional Development and the Minister of Economy to help the victims, as well as talking to the governor of the state of Rio. According to his son, Flávio Bolsonaro, and later confirmed on his own social networks. Bolsonaro visited Petrópolis on 18 February. The federal government also announced a minimum contribution of R$2.3 million for the city. The Caixa Econômica Federal announced that it had opened a fund for the city.

Caixa Econômica Federal said it had opened a branch on an emergency basis to assist victims in Petrópolis who need to withdraw their FGTS (Severance Indemnity Fund) funds.

The Ministry of Health said that it had sent teams from the Unified Health System (SUS) to the region. It also donated 500kg of medicines for post-disaster care. In all, 32 types of medicine and medicines and 16 supplies were sent to Petrópolis. These medicines were used to prevent the proliferation of worms and viruses that are common after floods. It has also been estimated that 13 Basic Health Units (UBS), one Emergency Care Unit (UPA) and two other health services were damaged by the disaster.

==== Brazilian States ====
- Rio de Janeiro: The governor of the state of Rio de Janeiro, Cláudio Castro, announced on his social networks that he had mobilized more firefighters and ambulances. The governor also went to the most affected region of Petrópolis together with the Civil Defense and the president of the Legislative Assembly of Rio de Janeiro, André Ceciliano, to analyze how to proceed after the disaster. The city hall of Petrópolis declared three days of mourning.
- São Paulo: Through the command of its governor João Dória, the government of São Paulo sent a team of four firefighters and two sniffer dogs, following a request made by the governor of Rio de Janeiro Cláudio Castro. In addition to the firefighters with rescue dogs, the São Paulo state government also made available the São Paulo State Military Police's Águia helicopters.
- Rio Grande do Sul: The governor of the state of Rio Grande do Sul, Eduardo Leite, had already made the Civil Defence and Fire Brigade available for the search in Petrópolis as soon as the catastrophe in the city was announced. Due to the complex logistics of getting to the region, the firefighters only arrived in the city on 20 February. The soldiers from Rio Grande do Sul were responsible for finding another family of gauchos who were buried under the rubble. The family had been missing after a house in the region collapsed and with the help of the rescue dogs of the Military Fire Brigade they were located, but unfortunately they were already lifeless.

===== Brazilian Imperial Family =====
The laudêmio issue refers to the tax paid by the population of Petrópolis to the heirs of Emperor Pedro II, which is collected by Companhia Imobiliária de Petrópolis, administered by ten heirs of the House of Orléans-Braganza, of the former Brazilian Imperial Family.

Prince Bertrand Orléans-Braganza, a pretender to the imperial throne Brazil and Head of the Imperial Family, lamented the heavy rains that hit the city and denied on Twitter that his dynastic branch of family, known as the Vassouras Branch, receives funds from the laudêmio. The special tax is fact received by those of the Petrópolis Branch, a fact that sparked criticism among the inhabitants of the city.

In 2022 number of bills were tabled before the Chamber of Deputies proposing the extinction of laudêmio in the municipality of Petrópolis. However, as of 2023 this tax was still in force.

=== Foreign Countries ===
- Holy See: On 18 February, Pope Francis sent a message to the bishop of Petrópolis, Gregório Paixão Neto, in which he lamented and said he was praying for the victims of the tragedy. On 20 February, after the traditional Angelus prayer in St Peter's Square at the Vatican, the pontiff spoke about the issue.
- United Kingdom: On 21 February, Queen Elizabeth II sent a message of condolence to Brazil's President Jair Bolsonaro. The monarch declared her deep sadness at the destruction caused in the city.

== See also ==
- 2022 Brazil floods and landslides
- January 2011 Rio de Janeiro floods and mudslides
- Late December 2021 Bahia floods
- List of deadliest floods
- Weather of 2022
