= Hélio Gonçalves Heleno =

- Bishop of Caratinga
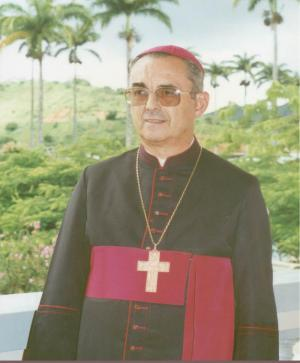
- Church: Catholic Church
- Diocese: Diocese of Caratinga
- In office: 27 November 1978 – 16 February 2011
- Predecessor: José Eugênio Corrêa
- Successor: Emanuel Messias de Oliveira

Orders
- Ordination: 3 December 1961
- Consecration: 22 February 1979 by Oscar de Oliveira

Personal details
- Born: 18 May 1935 Cipotânea, Minas Gerais, Republic of the United States of Brazil
- Died: 4 September 2012 (aged 77)

Hélio Gonçalves Heleno (18 May 1935 – 4 September 2012) was the Roman Catholic bishop of the Roman Catholic Diocese of Caratinga, Brazil.

Ordained to the priesthood in 1961, he was named bishop in 1978 and retired in 2011.

Gonçalves was the brother of Bishop José Gonçalves Heleno (1927–2021), who served as the Bishop of the Roman Catholic Diocese of Governador Valadares from 1977 to 2001. The two Gonçalves brothers are buried next to each other at the Sao Joao Batista Cathedral in Caratinga.
