= Diocese of Nova Friburgo =

Catholic ecclesiastical territory

Diocese of Nova Friburgo Dioecesis Neo-Friburgensis

Catholic
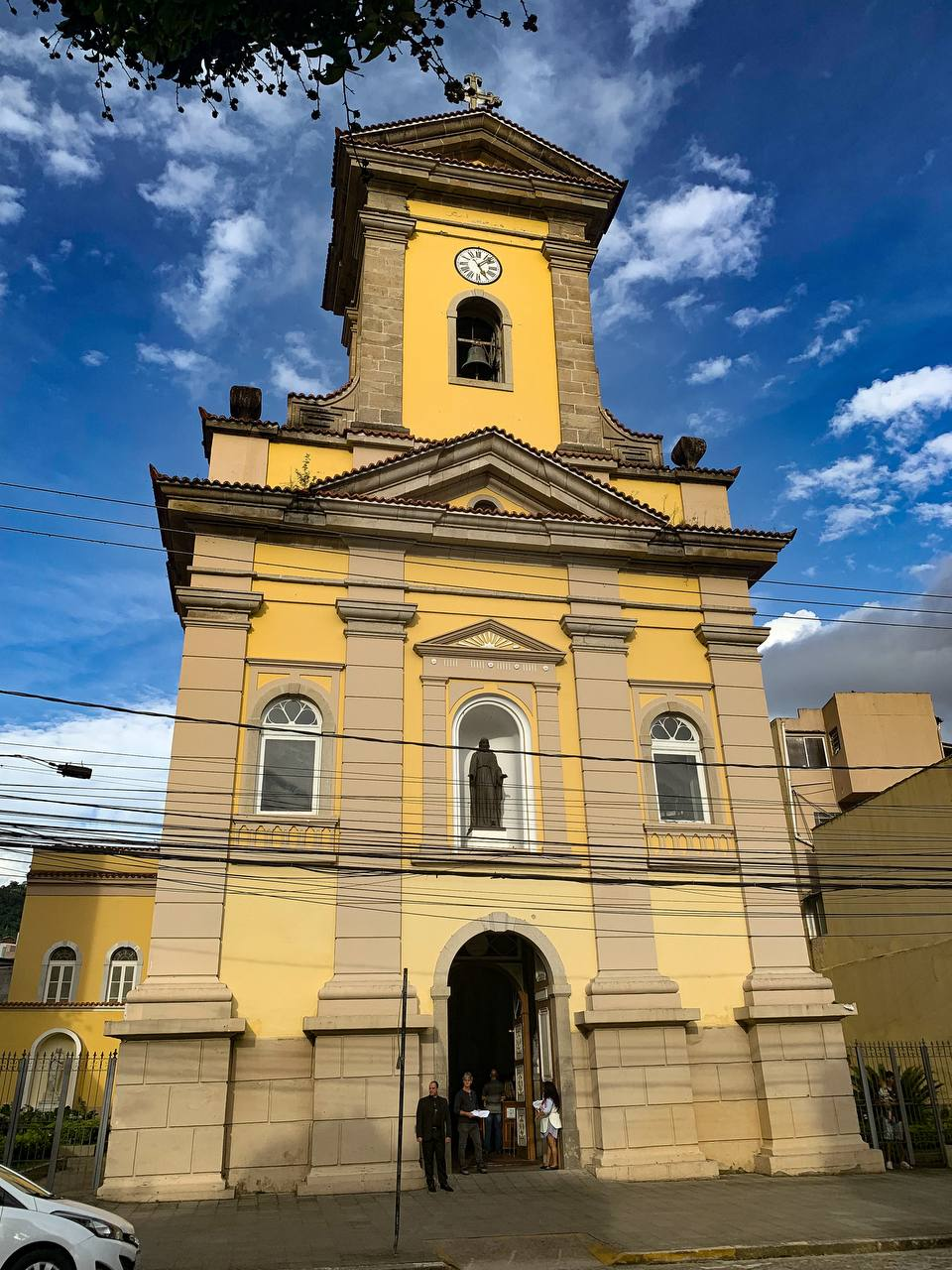
- atedral São João Batista in 2024

Location
- Country: Brazil
- Ecclesiastical province: Niterói

Statistics
- Area: 10,086 km^{2} (3,894 sq mi)
- Population: Total; Catholics: (as of 2004); 620,000; 503,000 (81.1%)

Information
- Sui iuris church: Latin Church
- Rite: Roman Rite
- Established: 26 March 1960 (66 years ago)
- Cathedral: Catedral São João Batista

Current leadership
- Pope: Leo XIV
- Bishop: Pedro Cunha Cruz
- Bishops emeritus: Edney Gouvea Mattoso; Luiz Antônio Lopes Ricci

Website
- diocesenf.org.br

The Roman Catholic Diocese of Nova Friburgo (Latin: Dioecesis Neo-Friburgensis) is a diocese located in the city of Nova Friburgo in the ecclesiastical province of Niterói in Brazil.

== History ==
- March 26, 1960: Established as Diocese of Nova Friburgo from the Diocese of Barra do Piraí and Diocese of Petrópolis

== Leadership ==
- Bishops of Nova Friburgo (Latin Church)
  - Clemente Isnard (23 Apr 1960 – 17 Jul 1992)
  - Alano Maria Pena (24 Nov 1993 – 24 Sep 2003), appointed Archbishop of Niterói, Rio de Janeiro
  - Rafael Llano Cifuentes (12 May 2004 – 20 Jan 2010)
  - Edney Gouvea Mattoso (20 Jan 2010 – 22 Jan 2020); formerly an Auxiliary Bishop of the Roman Catholic Archdiocese of Sao Sebastiao do Rio de Janeiro, Brazil
  - Luiz Antônio Lopes Ricci (6 May 2020–???); formerly Auxiliary Bishop of the Archdiocese of Niteroi, Brazil.
  - Pedro Cunha Cruz (02 July 2025 - present) formerly Bishop of the Diocese of Campanha, Brazil.
