= Aldo Gerna =

Italian-born Brazilian Roman Catholic bishop (born 1931)

His Excellency, The Most Reverend Aldo Gerna FSCJ
- Bishop Emeritus of São Mateus
- Church: Roman Catholic Church
- Archdiocese: Archdiocese of Vitória
- Diocese: Diocese of São Mateus
- Appointed: 18 May 1971
- Term ended: 3 October 2007
- Predecessor: José Dalvit
- Successor: Zanoni Demettino Castro

Orders
- Ordination: 22 December 1956
- Consecration: 1 August 1971 by João Batista da Mota e Albuquerque

Personal details
- Born: 7 May 1931 (age 95) Arigna, Ponte in Valtellina, Province of Sondrio, Lombardy, Italy
- Denomination: Roman Catholic
- Motto: Scio Cui Credidi

Aldo Gerna FSCJ (born 7 May 1931) is an Italian-born Brazilian Roman Catholic missionary and prelate, who served as the second bishop of the Diocese of São Mateus, in Espírito Santo, Brazil, from 1971 until his retirement in 2007. He is a member of the Comboni Missionaries.

== Early life and education ==
Gerna was born on 7 May 1931 in Arigna, a village in the municipality of Ponte in Valtellina in the Province of Sondrio, Lombardy, Italy, to Andrea and Teresa Gerna.

He entered the seminary in 1943 and later studied philosophy and theology at the Pontifical Urban University in Rome. He made his religious profession in the congregation of the Comboni Missionaries on 9 September 1950.

Gerna was ordained a priest on 22 December 1956 in Rome.

== Missionary work in Brazil ==
In November 1957 Gerna moved to Brazil as a missionary and began serving in the Archdiocese of Vitória with the intention of working in the newly established Diocese of São Mateus in Espírito Santo.

He served as parish vicar in São Mateus between 1957 and 1962 and later held several diocesan roles including chancellor, vicar general, and advisor for pastoral ministries.

Gerna became a naturalized Brazilian citizen in 1976.

== Bishop of São Mateus ==
On 18 May 1971 Pope Paul VI appointed Gerna as the second bishop of the Diocese of São Mateus.

He received episcopal consecration and took canonical possession of the diocese on 1 August 1971.

During his episcopacy he promoted pastoral work among rural communities and encouraged the development of base ecclesial communities and lay participation in church life.

He also oversaw the development of diocesan institutions and pastoral initiatives throughout the region.

== Retirement ==
Pope Benedict XVI accepted Gerna's resignation from the pastoral governance of the Diocese of São Mateus on 3 October 2007.

He became bishop emeritus and continued living in São Mateus, occasionally participating in diocesan activities.

== Honours ==
In 2005 the city of Sondrio granted Gerna honorary citizenship in recognition of his missionary and pastoral work in Brazil.
