= José Gonçalves Heleno =

Brazilian priest (1927–2021)

- Bishop of Governador Valadares
- Church: Catholic Church
- Diocese: Diocese of Governador Valadares
- In office: 7 December 1977 – 25 April 2001
- Predecessor: Hermínio Malzone Hugo
- Successor: Werner Franz Siebenbrock
- Previous posts: Apostolic Administrator of Guanhães (1995-1998); Coadjutor Bishop of Governador Valadares (1976-1977)

Orders
- Ordination: 30 November 1952
- Consecration: 18 October 1976 by Oscar de Oliveira

Personal details
- Born: 3 November 1927 Cipotânea, Minas Gerais, Republic of the United States of Brazil
- Died: 1 September 2021 (aged 93) Caratinga, Minas Gerais, Brazil

Jose Gonçalves Heleno (3 November 1927 – 1 September 2021) was a Brazilian Roman Catholic prelate. He was first appointed a coadjutor bishop of the Roman Catholic Diocese of Governador Valadares from 1976 to 1977. He then served as the Bishop of Governador Valadares from 7 December 1977 until his retirement on 25 April 2001.

== Biography ==
Gonçalves Heleno was born in Cipotânea, Minas Gerais, Brazil, on 3 November 1927 to José Francisco Heleno and wife Maria Francisca de Almeida. He was the brother of Hélio Gonçalves Heleno (1935–2012), who served as the Bishop of the Roman Catholic Diocese of Caratinga from 1978 to 2011.

Gonçalves Heleno died in Caratinga on 1 September 2021, at the age of 93. He had lived in Caratinga for approximately 20 years following a stroke. He was buried next to his brother at the São João Batista Cathedral in Caratinga on 1 September 2021.
