= Crescênzio Rinaldini =

Brazilian Roman Catholic bishop

- Bishop of Araçuaí
- Native name: Crescenzio Rinaldini
- Church: Catholic Church
- Diocese: Diocese of Araçuaí
- In office: 10 May 1982 – 8 August 2001
- Predecessor: Silvestre Luís Scandián
- Successor: Dario Campos

Orders
- Ordination: 26 June 1949
- Consecration: 4 July 1982 by Luigi Morstabilini

Personal details
- Born: 27 December 1925 Gardone Val Trompia, Province of Brescia, Kingdom of Italy
- Died: 24 October 2011 (aged 85)

Crescênzio Rinaldini (27 December 1925 – 24 October 2011) was a Roman Catholic prelate who served as bishop of the Diocese of Araçuaí, Brazil between 1982 and 2001. Ordained priest in Brescia in 1949, he became a bishop emeritus upon his retirement in 2001.
