= Diocese of São Mateus =

Catholic ecclesiastical territory

Diocese of São Mateus Dioecesis Sancti Matthaei

Catholic
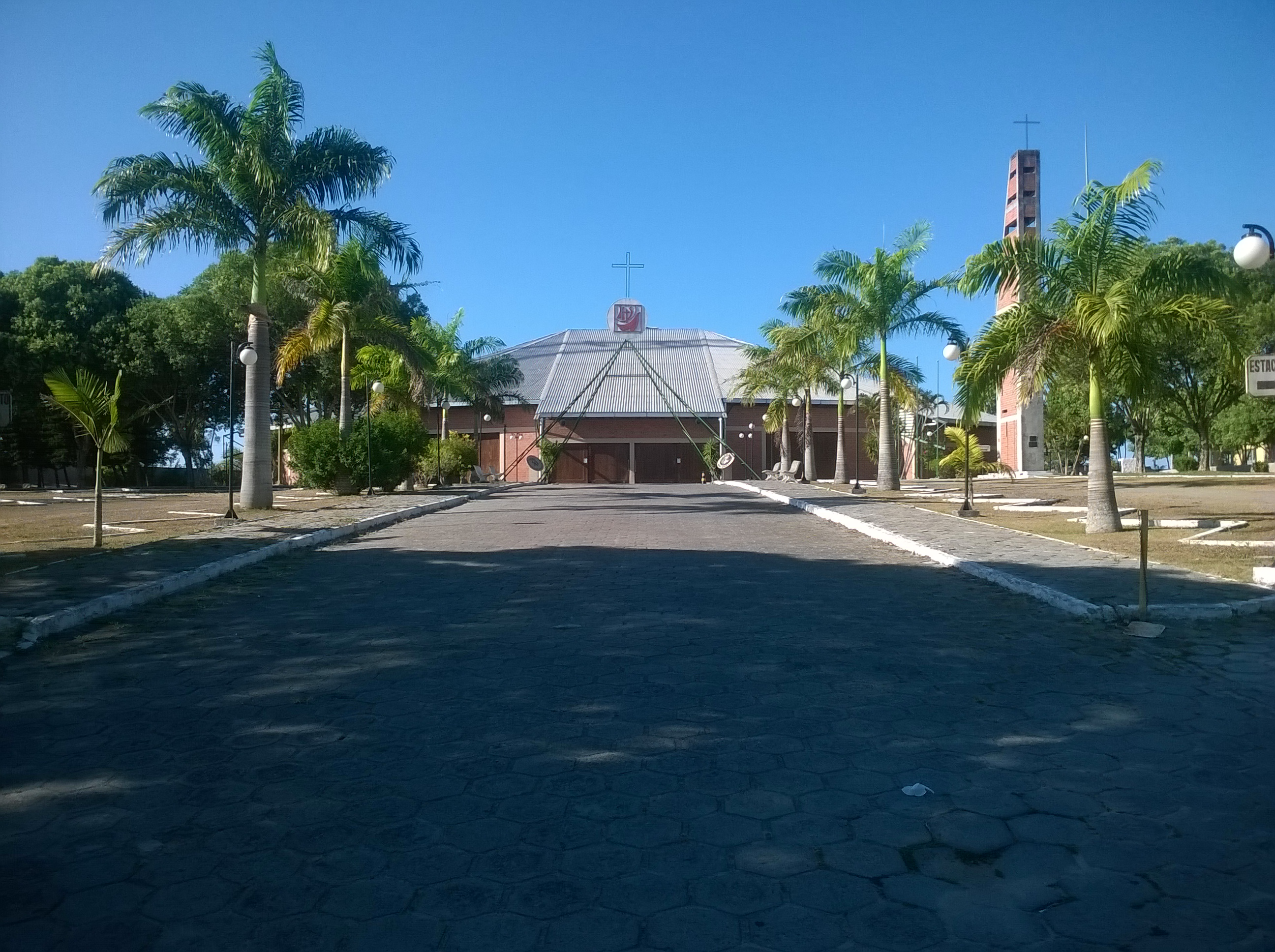
- St. Matthew Cathedral

Location
- Country: Brazil
- Ecclesiastical province: Vitória

Statistics
- Area: 15,104 km^{2} (5,832 sq mi)
- Population: Total; Catholics: (as of 2004); 428,339; 304,426 (71.1%)

Information
- Rite: Latin Rite
- Established: 16 February 1958 (68 years ago)
- Cathedral: Catedral de São Mateus

Current leadership
- Pope: Leo XIV
- Bishop: Paulo Bosi Dal'Bó
- Metropolitan Archbishop: Ângelo Ademir Mezzari
- Bishops emeritus: Aldo Gerna, M.C.C.I.

Website
- www.diocesedesaomateus.org.br

The Roman Catholic Diocese of São Mateus (Latin: Dioecesis Sancti Matthaei) is a diocese located in the city of São Mateus in the ecclesiastical province of Vitória in Brazil.

== History ==
- 16 February 1958: Established as Diocese of São Mateus from the Diocese of Espírito Santo

== Leadership ==
- Bishops of São Mateus (Roman rite)
  - Bishop José Dalvit, M.C.C.I. (1959.05.09 – 1970.05.14)
  - Bishop Aldo Gerna, M.C.C.I. (1971.05.18 – 2007.10.03)
  - Bishop Zanoni Demettino Castro (2007.10.03 – 2014.12.03)
  - Bishop Paulo Bosi Dal'Bó (2015.10.21 – present)
