= Luciano Bergamin =

Italian bishop

Luciano Bergamin CRL
- Bishop Emeritus of Nova Iguaçu
- Church: Catholic Church
- Diocese: Diocese of Nova Iguaçu
- In office: 24 July 2002 – 15 May 2019
- Predecessor: Werner Franz Siebenbrock
- Successor: Gilson Andrade da Silva
- Previous posts: Titular Bishop of Octabia (2000-2002); Auxiliary Bishop of Santo Amaro (2000-2002)

Orders
- Ordination: 10 April 1969
- Consecration: 20 May 2000 by Fernando Figueiredo

Personal details
- Born: 4 May 1944 (age 81) Loria, Province of Treviso, Italian Social Republic

Luciano Bergamin CRL (born 4 May 1944 in Loria, Veneto) is an Italian clergyman and Roman Catholic Bishop Emeritus of Nova Iguaçu in Brazil.

== Life ==
On 19 December 1982 Luciano Bergamin joined the community of the Canons Regular of the Lateran, took up the profession on 2 October 1960 and received the priestly ordination on 10 April 1969.

Pope John Paul II appointed him on 5 April 2000 as auxiliary bishop in Santo Amaro and titular bishop of Octabia. The bishop gave him the bishop of Santo Amaro, to Fernando Antônio Figueiredo, on 20 May that year. Co-consecrators were Emílio Pignoli, Bishop of Campo Limpo, and Francisco Manuel Vieira, Bishop of Osasco. He chose DOMINUS LUX ET SALUS as his motto.

On 24 July 2002 he was appointed Bishop of Nova Iguaçu.
