= Diocese of Guanhães =

Catholic ecclesiastical territory

Diocese of Guanhães Dioecesis Guanhanensis Diocese de Guanhães

Location
- Country: Brazil
- Ecclesiastical province: Diamantina
- Metropolitan: Diamantina

Statistics
- Area: 15,047 km^{2} (5,810 sq mi)
- Population: Total; Catholics: (as of 2023); 273,600; 222,800 (81.4%)
- Parishes: 25

Information
- Denomination: Catholic Church
- Sui iuris church: Latin Church
- Rite: Roman Rite
- Established: 24 May 1985; 41 years ago
- Cathedral: Cathedral of St Michael in Guanhães
- Secular priests: 29 (All Dioocesan)

Current leadership
- Pope: Leo XIV
- Bishop: Otacílio Ferreira de Lacerda
- Metropolitan Archbishop: Darci José Nicioli, C.Ss.R.
- Bishops emeritus: Jeremias Antônio de Jesus

Website
- diocesedeguanhaes.com.br

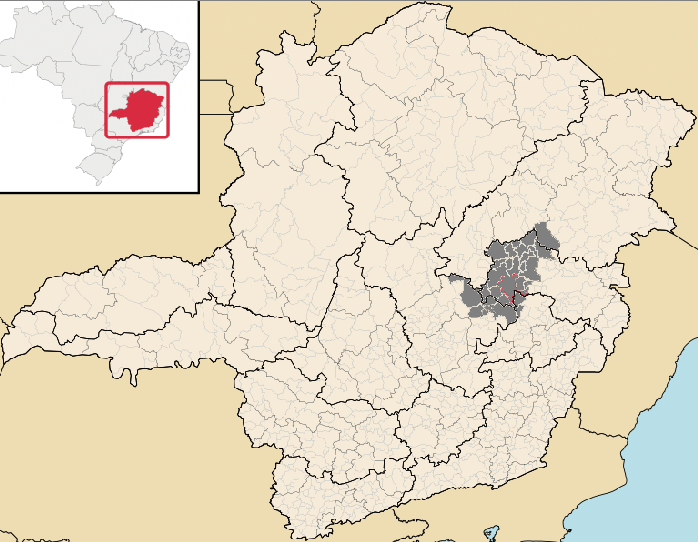
Roman Catholic Diocese of Guanhães.

The Roman Catholic Diocese of Guanhães (Latin: Dioecesis Guanhanensis) is a diocese located in the city of Guanhães in the ecclesiastical province of Diamantina in Brazil.

== History ==
- 24 May 1985: Established as Diocese of Guanhães from the Metropolitan Archdiocese of Diamantina, Diocese of Governador Valadares and Diocese of Itabira–Fabriciano

== Bishops ==
Bishops of Guanhães (Roman rite)

- Antônio Felippe da Cunha, S.D.N. (8 December 1985 – 8 February 1995), resigned
  - Apostolic Administrator José Gonçalves Heleno (19 July 1995 – 17 May 1998), Bishop of Governador Valadares, Minas Gerais
- Emanuel Messias de Oliveira (14 January 1998 – 16 February 2011), appointed Bishop of Caratinga, Minas Gerais
- Jeremias Antônio de Jesus (30 May 2012 – 4 July 2018), resigned
  - Apostolic Administrator Darci José Nicioli, C.Ss.R. (4 July 2018 – 14 September 2019), Archbishop of Diamantina, Minas Gerais
- Otacílio Ferreira de Lacerda (19 June 2019 – Present)

=== Other priests of this diocese who became bishops ===
- Marcello Romano, appointed Bishop of Araçuaí in 2012
- Jacy Diniz Rocha, appointed Bishop of São Luíz de Cáceres, Mato Grosso in 2017
