= Vital João Geraldo Wilderink =

Dutch-born Brazilian Roman Catholic bishop

Vital João Geraldo Wilderink OCarm
- Bishop of Itaguaí
- Church: Catholic Church
- Diocese: Diocese of Itaguaí
- In office: 21 April 1980 – 8 July 1998
- Predecessor: Diocese erected
- Successor: José Ubiratan Lopes
- Previous posts: Titular Bishop of Iunca in Byzacena (1978-1980); Auxiliary Bishop of Barra do Piraí-Volta Redonda (1978-1980)

Orders
- Ordination: 7 July 1957
- Consecration: 13 August 1978 by Waldyr Calheiros Novaes

Personal details
- Born: Vitalis João Geraldo Wilderink; 30 November 1931 Deventer, Overijssel, Netherlands
- Died: 11 June 2014 (aged 82)

Vital João Geraldo Wilderink (30 November 1931 in Deventer, Netherlands – 11 June 2014) was a Dutch-born Brazilian who presides as the Roman Catholic bishop of the Roman Catholic Diocese of Itaguaí, Brazil.

Ordained to the priesthood in 1957, he was appointed a bishop in 1978 and as bishop of the Itaguaí Diocese in 1980. Bishop Wilderink resigned in 1998.

== Notes ==
- Catholic Hierarchy
