= Laudemium =

Decree-law 9.760/1946

Government of Brazil
- Long title: Provides for federal real estate and other measures.
- Citation: 1946, c. 3493
- Territorial extent: Brazil
- Enacted by: President of the Republic
- Enacted: 5 September 1949
- Assented to: 5 September 1949
- Signed by: Eurico Gaspar Dutra
- Commenced: 5 September 1949

Legislative history
- Bill title: Provides for federal real estate and other measures.

Amends
- Law No. 14.011, of 10 June 2020

Summary
- Regulates the Madeira Free Trade Zone Tax Regime.

Keywords
- Taxation
- Status: In force

Laudemium is compensation owed to the direct landlord for not using the right of pre-emption when the emphyteusis onerously disposes of the leasehold property. It corresponds to a percentage of the property's market value, to be paid when there is an onerous transaction with a definitive deed of occupation rights or the leasing of land.

== Brazil ==
In Brazil, the main holders of this right are the Federal Government (marine land) and the Catholic Church. There are also private emphyteuses, such as that of the Petrópolis Branch of the Brazilian Imperial Family, which is justified by the fact that these instalments do not constitute a tax in legal terms, but rather a real right, such as rent.

The body responsible for demarcating the areas on which the Union's laudemium is levied is the Union Patrimony Secretariat (SPU), a body currently linked to the Ministry of Economy.

The position adopted in the Civil Code in relation to "emphyteusis" (art. 678) is that this is an outdated form of constitution of a right in rem over something else, which was relegated to the chapter on transitional provisions. Hence the prohibition on charging the contract transfer fee, known as "laudêmio" and, in the context in question, "subenfiteuse" will be prohibited, as a means of discouraging the emphyteusis contract.

=== Marine land ===
The concept of marine land has been defined since 22 February 1868, when Imperial Decree No. 4.105 was published,[3] which establishes in its article 1, § 1:

Marine lands are all those bathed by the waters of the sea or navigable rivers up to a distance of 15 fathoms (27 metres) from the land, counted from the point reached by the mean high tide.

This point refers to the state of the place at the time of the execution of the law of 15 November 1831, article 51, paragraph 14 (instruction of 14 November 1832, article 4). Article 2 of Decree-Law 9.760/46 updated the text as follows:

Art. 2 - The following are marine lands, at a depth of 33 (thirty-three) metres, measured horizontally, for the part of the land, from the position of the line of the mean high tide of 1831:

"a) those situated on the mainland, on the sea coast and on the banks of rivers and lagoons, as far as the influence of the tides can be felt; "b) those around islands situated in an area where the influence of the tides can be felt.

"Sole Paragraph. For the purposes of this article, the influence of the tides is characterised by the periodic oscillation of 5 (five) centimetres or less in the level of the waters, occurring at any time of the year.

=== Imperial family estates ===
In 1822, the then Prince Pedro, on a trip to Vila Rica, Minas Gerais, in search of support for the Brazilian Independence movement, decided to stay in a property on the banks of the Piabanha River valley. During his stay, he was enchanted by the Atlantic Forest and the mild climate of the mountainous region, today known as Serra dos Órgãos. Eight years later, in 1830, shortly before resigning as emperor, he acquired a nearby property, called Fazenda do Córrego Seco, renamed Imperial Fazenda da Concórdia, where he intended to build a summer residence. After his death in 1834, the property was left as an inheritance to his son, the future emperor Pedro II.

In March 1843, Emperor Pedro II signed a decree that approved, within the limits of the property, the construction of the residence and the leasing of the surrounding area, with the aim of starting a planned settlement, eventually becoming, through another decree in the decade next, the municipality of Petrópolis. Thus, since before the creation of the city itself, the entire populated region belonged to the imperial family, and followed the rules of an emphyteusis, an institute present in Brazil since colonial times, and replacing Portuguese tenure after Independence. By law, in force to this day, any real estate transaction in the so-called First District of Petrópolis adds a consideration to the imperial family (laudêmio), currently set at 2.5% of the operation.

However, since the 1940s, following a family agreement, only descendants of the Petrópolis Branch started to carry this right, through the Companhia Imobiliária de Petrópolis, while members of the Vassouras Branch no longer receive any amount.

=== Forum and occupancy rate ===
Union land is subject, in addition to the assessment, to a forum charge (annualized rate corresponding to 0.6% of the value of the property) and occupancy tax (which can be 2% or 5%, and is charged to the owner which has not yet signed a lease agreement with the Union).

Owners of properties located in marine areas are divided into two types: OCCUPANTS (they only have the right to occupy and are the majority) and FOREIGNERS (those who have jurisdiction contracts and have more rights than the occupant, as they also have the useful domain) - residents of Baixada Santista and other Brazilian cities are included in these categories.

According to Decree-Law No. 9,760/1946, these are marine lands at a depth of 33 meters, measured horizontally towards the land, from the position of the mean high-water line of 1,831: a) Those located on the continent, on the sea coast and on the banks of rivers and lakes, as far as the influence of the tides is felt; b) Those that surround the islands, located in areas where the influence of the tides is felt.
