= Luiz Mancilha Vilela =

Brazilian Roman Catholic prelate (1942–2022)

His Excellency Luiz Mancilha Vilela
- Archbishop Emeritus of Vitória
- Installed: 14 April 2004
- Term ended: 7 November 2018
- Predecessor: Silvestre Luís Scandián
- Successor: Dario Campos
- Previous posts: Bishop of Cachoeiro de Itapemirim (1985–2002); Coadjutor Archbishop of Vitória (2002–2004)

Orders
- Ordination: 21 December 1968 by Serafim Fernandes de Araújo
- Consecration: 22 February 1986 by Serafim Fernandes de Araújo

Personal details
- Born: 6 May 1942 Pouso Alto, Minas Gerais, Brazil
- Died: 23 August 2022 (aged 80) Vitória, Espírito Santo, Brazil

Luiz Mancilha Vilela (6 May 1942 – 23 August 2022) was a Brazilian Roman Catholic prelate.

Mancilha Vilela was born in Brazil and was ordained to the priesthood in 1968. He served as the bishop of the Roman Catholic Diocese of Cachoeiro de Itapemirim, Brazil, from 1986 to 2002 and was coadjutor bishop and bishop of the Roman Catholic Archdiocese of Vitória, Brazil, from 2002 until his retirement in 2018.

Catholic Church titles
Preceded by Silvestre Luís Scandián	Archbishop of Vitória; 2004–2018	Succeeded by Dario Campos
Preceded by Luís Gonzaga Peluso	Bishop of Cachoeiro de Itapemirim; 1985–2002	Succeeded by Célio de Oliveira Goulart
