= Diocese of Governador Valadares =

Catholic ecclesiastical territory

Coordinates: 18.8562°S 41.9395°W

Diocese of Governador Valadares Dioecesis Valadarensis

Catholic
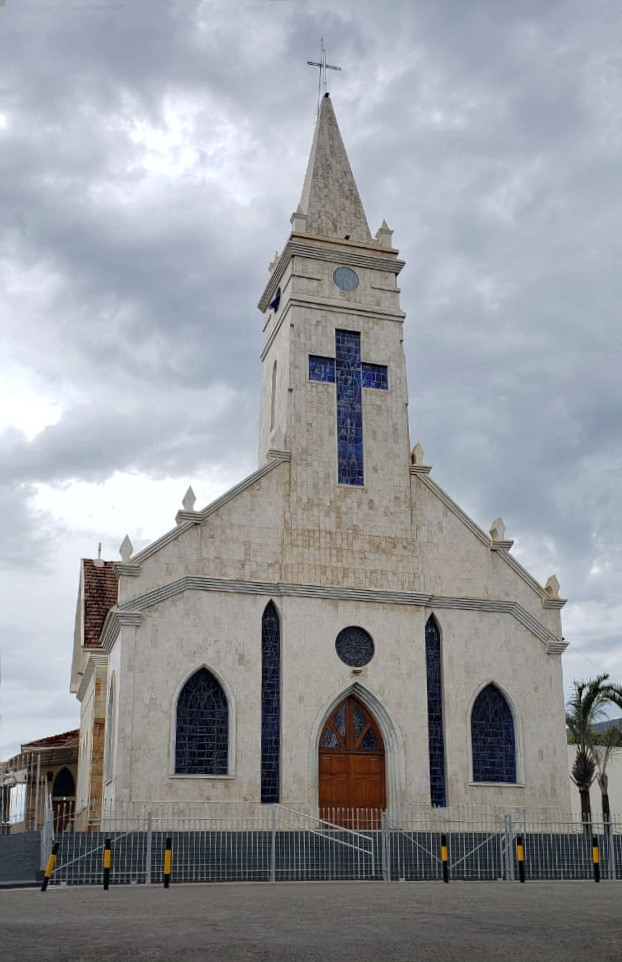
- Catedral de Santo Antônio de Pádua

Location
- Country: Brazil
- Ecclesiastical province: Mariana

Statistics
- Area: 15,023 km^{2} (5,800 sq mi)
- Population: Total; Catholics: (as of 2004); 500,000; 350,000 (70.0%)

Information
- Sui iuris church: Latin Church
- Rite: Roman Rite
- Established: 1 February 1956 (70 years ago)
- Cathedral: Catedral Santo Antônio de Pádua

Current leadership
- Pope: Leo XIV
- Bishop: Antônio Carlos Félix
- Metropolitan Archbishop: Geraldo Lyrio Rocha

Website
- www.diocesegv.org.br

The Roman Catholic Diocese of Governador Valadares (Latin: Dioecesis Valadarensis) is a diocese located in the city of Governador Valadares in the ecclesiastical province of Mariana in Brazil.

== History ==
On 1 February 1956 Pope Pius XII established the Diocese of Governador Valadares from the Diocese of Araçuaí, the Diocese of Caratinga and the Metropolitan Archdiocese of Diamantina.

== Bishops ==
- Bishops of Governador Valadares (Latin Church)
  - Hermínio Malzone Hugo (1957.01.29 – 1977.12.07)
  - José Gonçalves Heleno (1977.12.07 – 2001.04.25)
  - Werner Franz Siebenbrock, S.V.D. (2001.12.19 – 2014.03.06)
  - Antônio Carlos Félix (2014.03.06 -

=== Other priest of this diocese who became bishop ===
- Emanuel Messias de Oliveira, appointed Bishop of Guanhães in 1998
