= St. Anthony of Padua Cathedral, Governador Valadares =

St. Anthony of Padua Cathedral
- Catedral Santo Antônio de Pádua
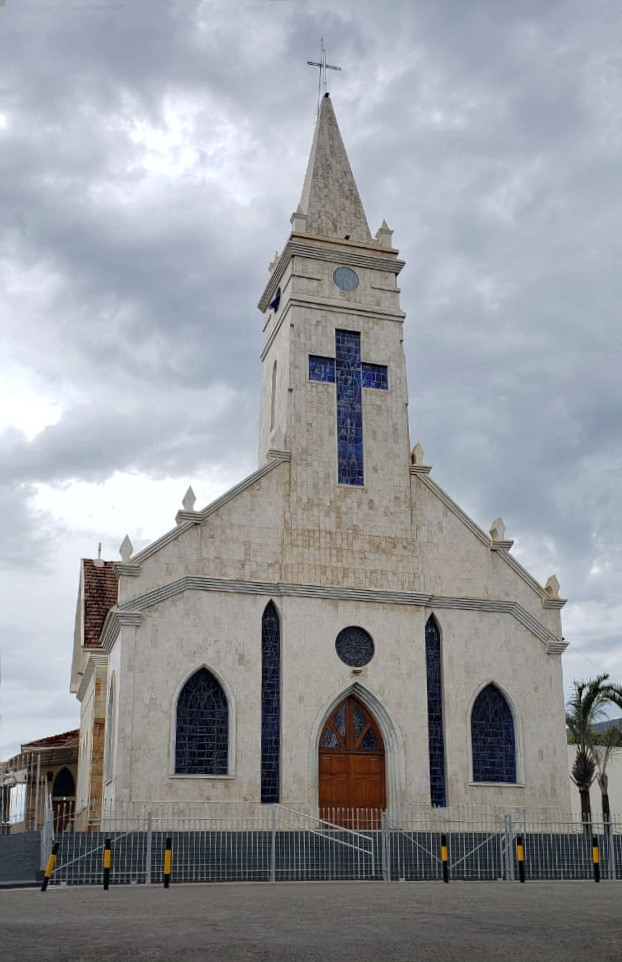
- St. Anthony of Padua Cathedral
- Location: Governador Valadares
- Country: Brazil
- Denomination: Roman Catholic Church

St. Anthony of Padua Cathedral (Portuguese: Catedral Santo Antônio de Pádua), also Governador Valadares Cathedral, is the cathedral of the Roman Catholic Diocese of Governador Valadares, located in the city of Governador Valadares, in the state of Minas Gerais, Brazil.

Dedicated to St. Anthony of Padua, it is located in Manuel Nunes Coelho Square, in the center of the city.

== History ==
The Chapel of Santo Antonio, built between 1910 and 1914, was the base of the local Catholic community and became the seat of the Parish of Santo Antonio de Figueira do Rio Doce in 1915. At that time, parish life began with records dated November 10 of the same year, signed by Frei Angelico de Campora Capuchinho. Until then there was a simple chapel, also dedicated to St. Anthony of Padua, built around 1886. The construction of the present cathedral began in 1924, under the coordination of the parson for the time, Sady Rabelo. The church was designated cathedral when the Diocese of Governador Valadares was erected on February 1, 1956.

== See also ==
- Roman Catholicism in Brazil
- St. Anthony of Padua
