= Clemente Isnard =

Clemente Isnard O.S.B.
- Bishop of Nova Friburgo
- Church: Catholic Church
- Diocese: Diocese of Nova Friburgo
- In office: 23 April 1960 – 17 July 1992
- Predecessor: Position established
- Successor: Alano Maria Pena

Orders
- Ordination: 19 December 1942
- Consecration: 25 July 1960 by Armando Lombardi

Personal details
- Born: 8 July 1917 Rio de Janeiro, United States of Brazil
- Died: 24 August 2011 (aged 94)

Clemente José Carlos de Gouvea Isnard, O.S.B. (8 July 1917 – 24 August 2011) was a Brazilian bishop of the Roman Catholic Church.

Isnard was born in Rio de Janeiro, Brazil in 1917 and was ordained a priest on 19 December 1942 of the Order of Saint Benedict. He was appointed Bishop of the Diocese of Nova Friburgo on 23 April 1960 and was ordained bishop 25 July 1960. Isnard remained at the diocese for over 30 years, retiring on 17 July 1992.
