= Our Lady of Victory Cathedral, Vitória =

Our Lady of Victory Cathedral
- Catedral Metropolitana Nossa Senhora da Vitória
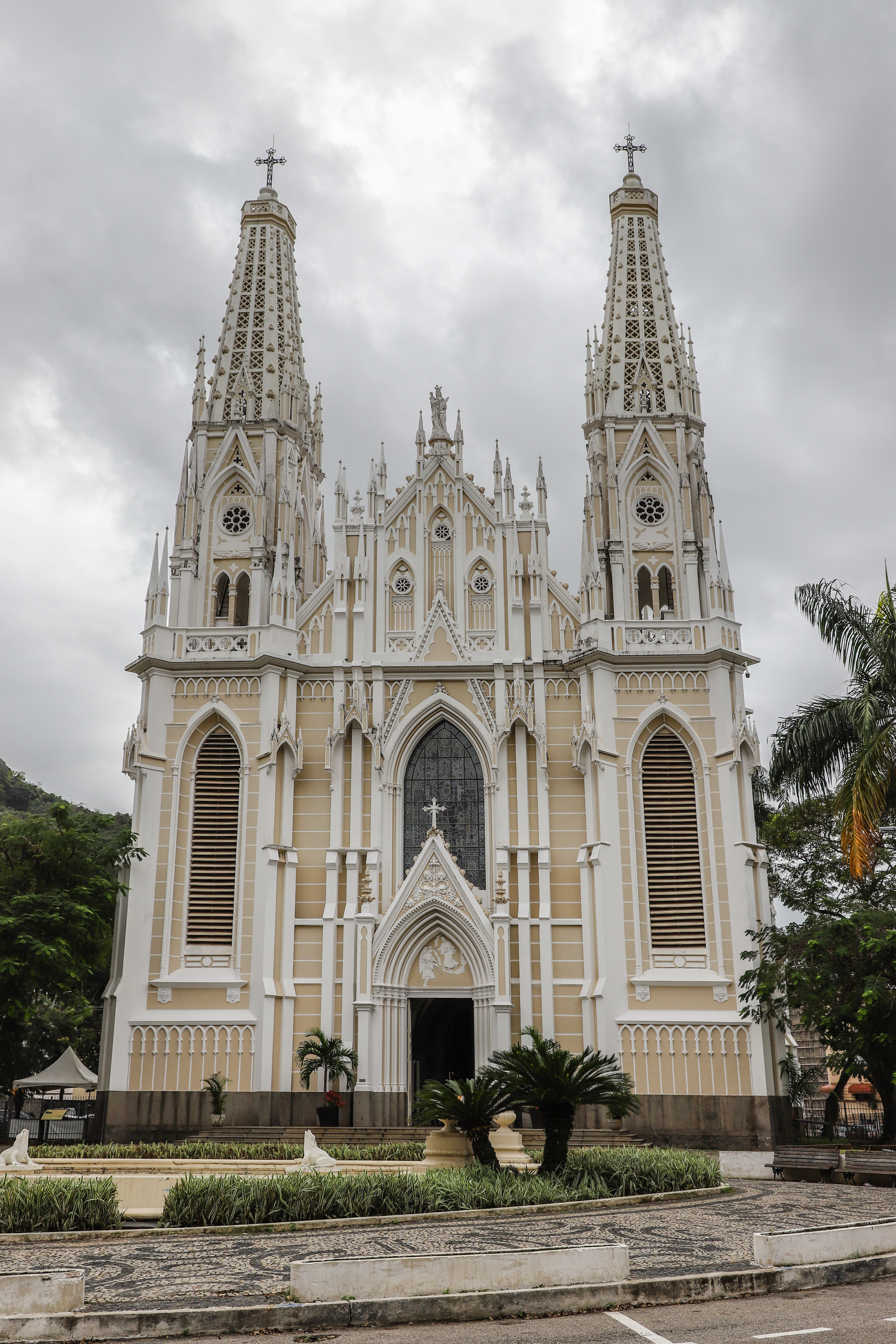

- Location of Our Lady of Victory Cathedral in Brazil
- 20.319939°S 40.337167°W
- Location: Vitória
- Country: Brazil
- Denomination: Roman Catholic Church

History
- Dedication: 1933

Architecture
- Groundbreaking: 1918

Administration
- Archdiocese: Vitória do Espírito Santo

The Our Lady of Victory Cathedral (Portuguese: Catedral Metropolitana Nossa Senhora da Vitória), also Vitória Cathedral, is a Catholic church in Dom Luiz Scortegagna Square, in the City of Vitória, Brazil.

== History ==
The cathedral is constructed on the site of a structure demolished at the beginning of the 20th century. Construction on the cathedral began in 1920 and was completed in the seventies.

It was built on the site where, until 1918, there was a church called Church of Our Lady of Victory (Nossa Senhora da Vitória), which was the main church of the city. It was a colonial style church, which began to be built in 1551, when Victoria was still called Vila Nova, in the period of the first grantee of the captaincy of the Holy Spirit, Vasco Fernandes Coutinho.

With the creation of the Diocese of Espíritu Santo (1895) and the appointment of the first bishop, Monsignor Juan Bautista Correia Neri, the church received the title of Cathedral.

== See also ==
- Roman Catholicism in Brazil
- Our Lady of Victory
