= José Eugênio Corrêa =

- Bishop of Caratinga (Emeritus)
- Church: Roman Catholic Church
- See: Roman Catholic Diocese of Caratinga
- In office: 1957–1978
- Predecessor: João Batista Cavati
- Successor: Hélio Gonçalves Heleno
- Previous post(s): Priest

Orders
- Ordination: 26 October 1941

Personal details
- Born: 29 May 1914; Lima Duarte, Brazil
- Died: 28 January 2010 (aged 95); Juiz de Fora, Brazil

José Eugênio Corrêa (29 May 1914 – 28 January 2010) was a Brazilian bishop of the Roman Catholic Church. Corrêa was born in Lima Duarte, Brazil in 1914. On 26 October 1941 Corrêa was ordained a priest for the Archidocese of Juiz de Fora. He was appointed bishop of the Diocese of Caratinga on 19 August 1957 and was ordained on 10 November 1957. Corrêa resigned from the Diocese of Caratinga on 27 November 1978.

== See also ==
- Roman Catholic Diocese of Caratinga
