= St. Matthew Cathedral, São Mateus =

St. Matthew Cathedral
- Catedral São Mateus
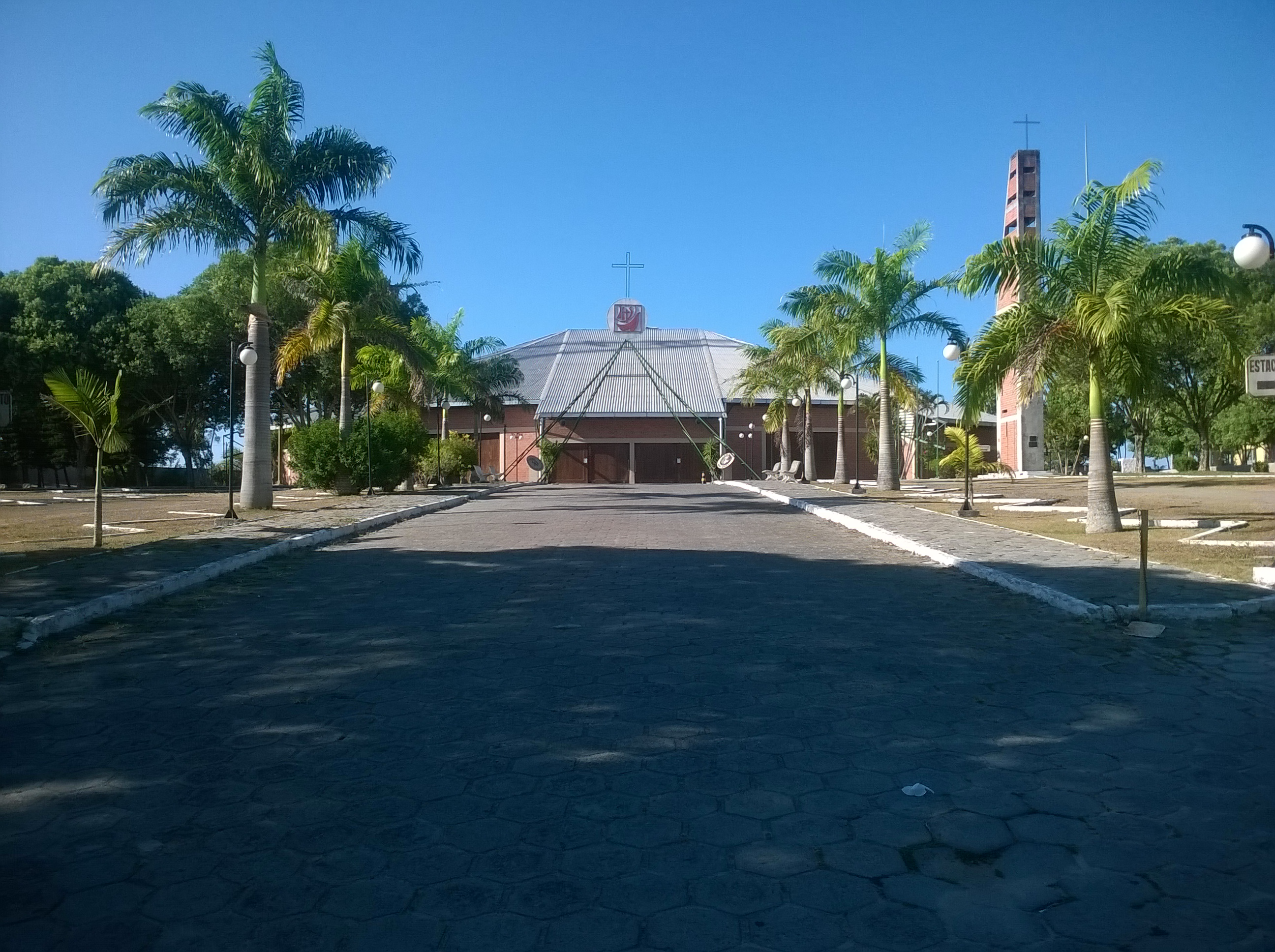
- St. Matthew Cathedral
- Location: São Mateus
- Country: Brazil
- Denomination: Roman Catholic Church

The St. Matthew Cathedral (Portuguese: Catedral de São Mateus) Also São Mateus Cathedral Is a Catholic church located in the municipality of São Mateus and is a reference in modern religious art in Brazil. It has in its interior impressionist paintings by Claudio Pastro, renowned artist of sacred art.

It was built in the form of a tent, since, according to Don Aldo Gerna, founding bishop of the cathedral, this is God's tent with men ("Behold the tabernacle of God with men" or "Behold the tent of God with men ").

The Cathedral of São Mateus is an imposing building, in the form of a tent. The construction of the temple began on November 15, 1987, the day of the laying of the first stone. Initial resources were obtained for this purpose with the sale of the building of the Holy Family (now CEUNES) and the state government, and to conclude it, donations were sought from Italian friends of Don Aldo and Diocesans.

The cathedral is enriched internally with Impressionist frescoes. The inauguration of the cathedral of St. Matthew was realized the 11 of December 1988, with the presence of Don Aldo Gerna, bishop of São Mateus.

== See also ==
- Roman Catholicism in Brazil
- St. Matthew Cathedral
