= Metropolitan Cathedral of St. John the Baptist, Niterói =

Metropolitan Cathedral of St. John the Baptist
- Catedral Metropolitana São João Batista
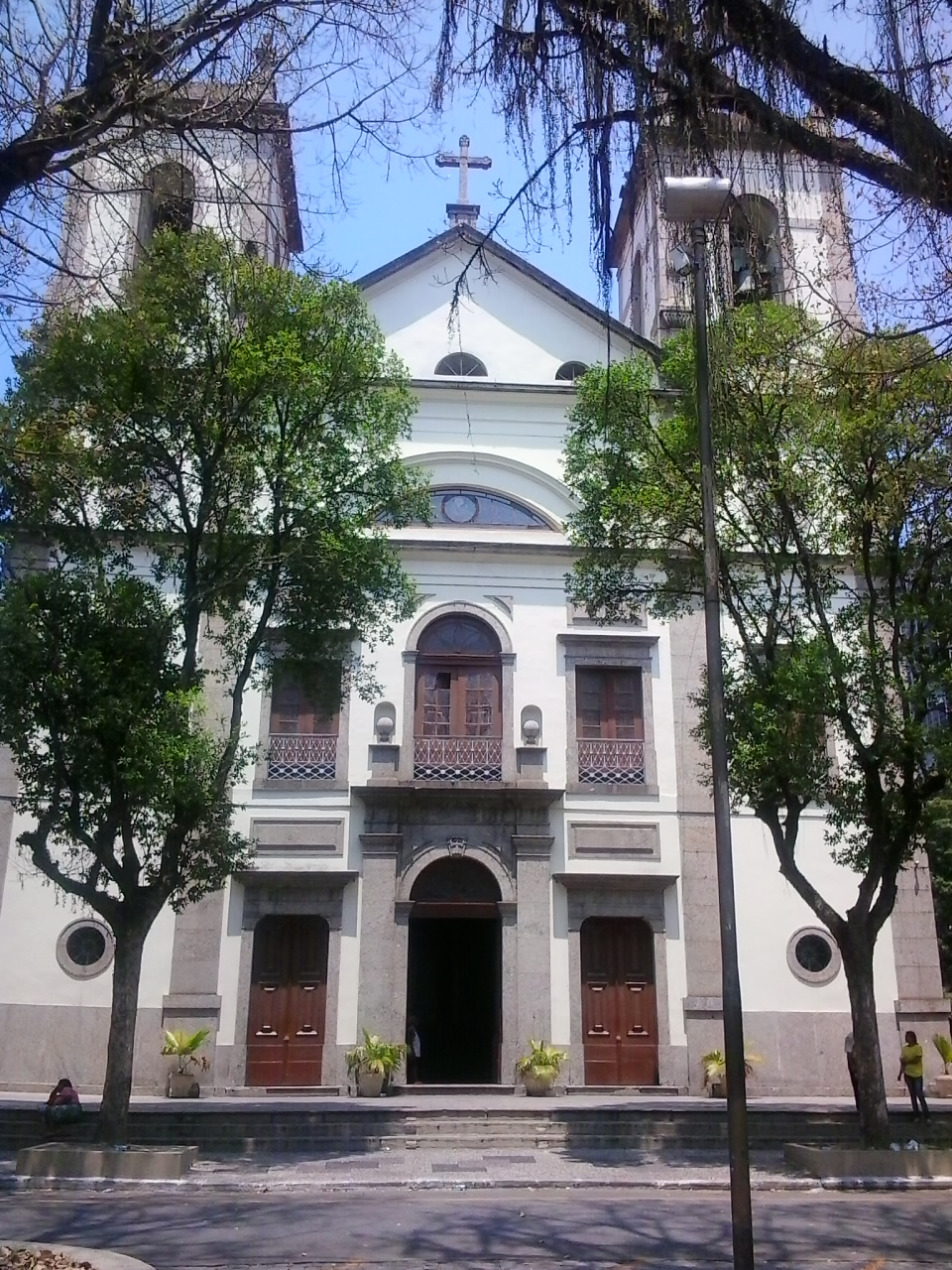
- Metropolitan Cathedral of St. John the Baptist
- 22°53′30″S 43°07′14″W
- Location: Niterói
- Country: Brazil
- Denomination: Roman Catholic Church

Administration
- Archdiocese: Roman Catholic Archdiocese of Niterói

The Metropolitan Cathedral of St. John the Baptist (Portuguese: Catedral Metropolitana São João Batista) Also Niterói Cathedral It is a Catholic cathedral built in late colonial style in the city of Niterói, in the state of Rio de Janeiro in the south of Brazil. It is located in Jardim São João, set of landscaped squares in the historical center of the city.

It has two bell towers and a rich religious decoration.

With the creation of the Royal Ville of Praia Grande, in Niteroi, in 1819, was designed to build a new headquarters at the front of the village.

The land was obtained from a donation in 1821 that was received by the Brotherhood of St. John the Baptist, which existed since 1742. In 1831, as the Vicar was Friar Tomaz Aquino, the new cathedral was blessed, for which the Blessed Sacrament was moved and the Images that were in the church of Our Lady of the Conception. It was declared a cathedral in 1908.

== See also ==
- List of cathedrals in Brazil
- Roman Catholicism in Brazil
- St. John the Baptist
