= Diocese of Cachoeiro de Itapemirim =

Catholic ecclesiastical territory

Coordinates: 20.8494°S 41.1127°W

Diocese of Cachoeiro de Itapemirim Dioecesis Cachoëirensis de Itapemirim

Catholic

Location
- Country: Brazil
- Ecclesiastical province: Vitória

Statistics
- Area: 10,073 km^{2} (3,889 sq mi)
- Population: Total; Catholics: (as of 2004); 611,943; 367,165 (60.0%)

Information
- Denomination: Catholic Church
- Rite: Latin Rite
- Established: 16 February 1958 (68 years ago)
- Cathedral: Catedral São Pedro Apóstolo

Current leadership
- Pope: Leo XIV
- Bishop: Luiz Fernando Lisboa, C.P.
- Metropolitan Archbishop: Ângelo Ademir Mezzari

Website
- www.diocesecachoeiro.org.br

The Roman Catholic Diocese of Cachoeiro de Itapemirim (Latin: Dioecesis Cachoëirensis de Itapemirim) is a diocese located in the city of Cachoeiro de Itapemirim in the ecclesiastical province of Vitória in Brazil.

== History ==
- 16 February 1958: Established as Diocese of Cachoeiro de Itapemirim from the Diocese of Espírito Santo

== Bishops ==
- Bishops of Cachoeiro de Itapemirim (Roman rite), in reverse chronological order
  - Bishop Luiz Fernando Lisboa, C.P. (2021.02.11 – Present)
  - Bishop Dario Campos, O.F.M. (2011.04.27 – 2018.11.07), appointed Archbishop of Vitória, Espirito Santo
  - Bishop Célio de Oliveira Goulart, O.F.M. (2003.07.09 – 2010.05.26), appointed Bishop of São João del Rei
  - Bishop Luiz Mancilha Vilela, SS.CC. (1985.12.03 – 2002.12.03), appointed Coadjutor Archbishop of Vitória, Espirito Santo
  - Bishop Luís Gonzaga Peluso (1959.07.25 – 1985.12.03), retired

=== Other priest of this diocese who became bishop ===
- Juarez Delorto Secco, appointed Auxiliary Bishop of São Sebastião do Rio de Janeiro
