= Rafael Llano Cifuentes =

Mexican-born Brazilian Roman Catholic prelate

- Bishop of Nova Friburgo
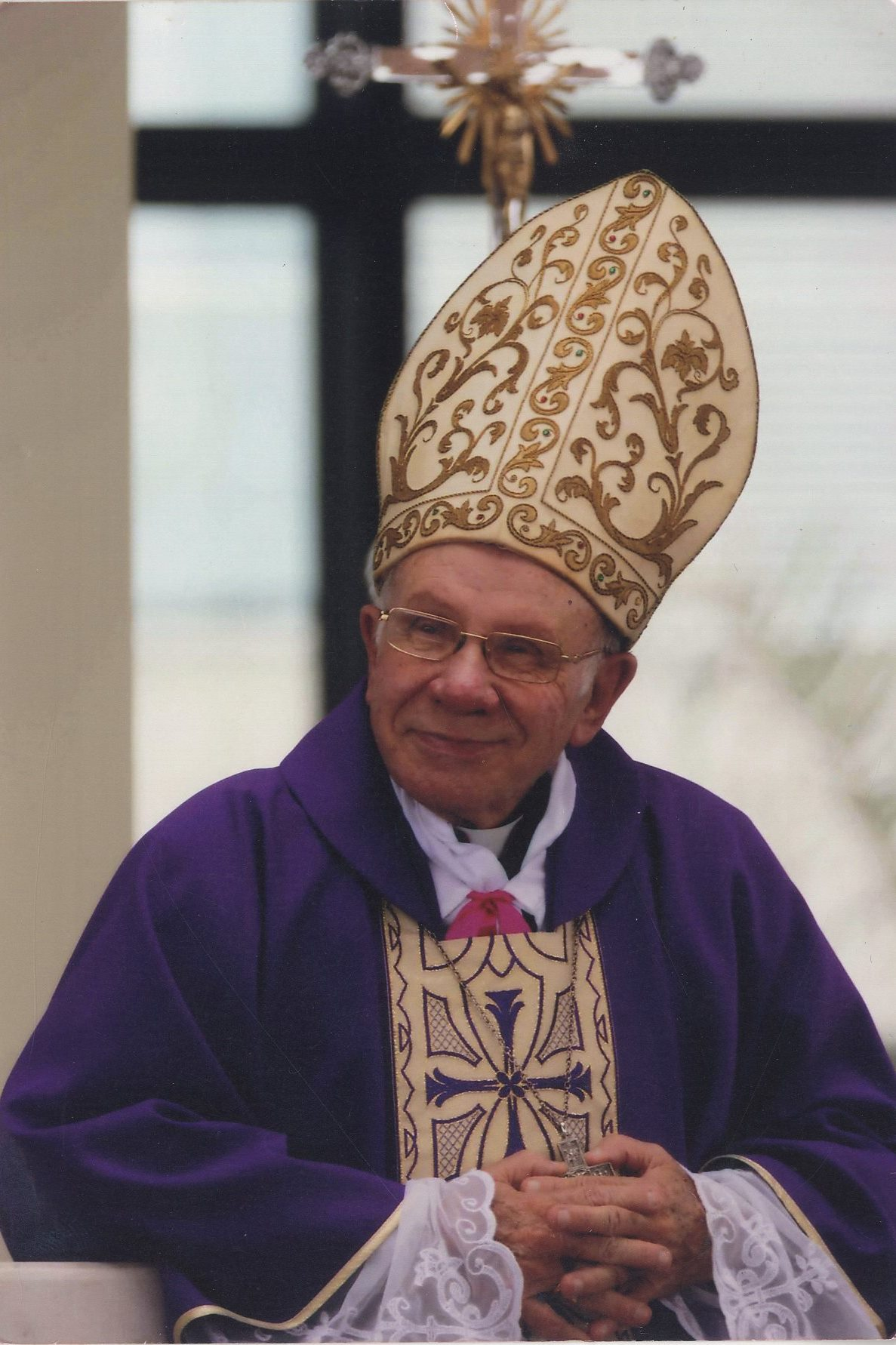
- Church: Catholic Church
- Diocese: Diocese of Nova Friburgo
- In office: 12 May 2004 – 20 January 2010
- Predecessor: Alano Maria Pena
- Successor: Edney Gouvêa Mattoso
- Previous posts: Titular Bishop of Mades (1990-2004); Auxiliary Bishop of Rio de Janeiro (1990-2004)

Orders
- Ordination: 20 December 1959
- Consecration: 29 June 1990 by Eugênio Sales

Personal details
- Born: 18 February 1933 Mexico City, Mexico
- Died: 28 November 2017 (aged 84) Tijuca, Rio de Janeiro, Brazil

Rafael Llano Cifuentes (18 February 1933 – 28 November 2017) was a Mexican-born Brazilian Roman Catholic prelate.

Born in Mexico City and raised in Brazil, Llano Cifuentes was ordained to the priesthood in 1959, and as a bishop in 1990. He served as the Bishop of Nova Friburgo from 2004 until his retirement in 2010. He died on 28 November 2017 in Tijuca, Rio de Janeiro, at the age of 84.
