= Archdiocese of Niterói =

Latin Catholic territory in Brazil

Coordinates: 22.8915°S 43.1204°W

Archdiocese of Niterói Archidioecesis Nictheroyensis

Catholic
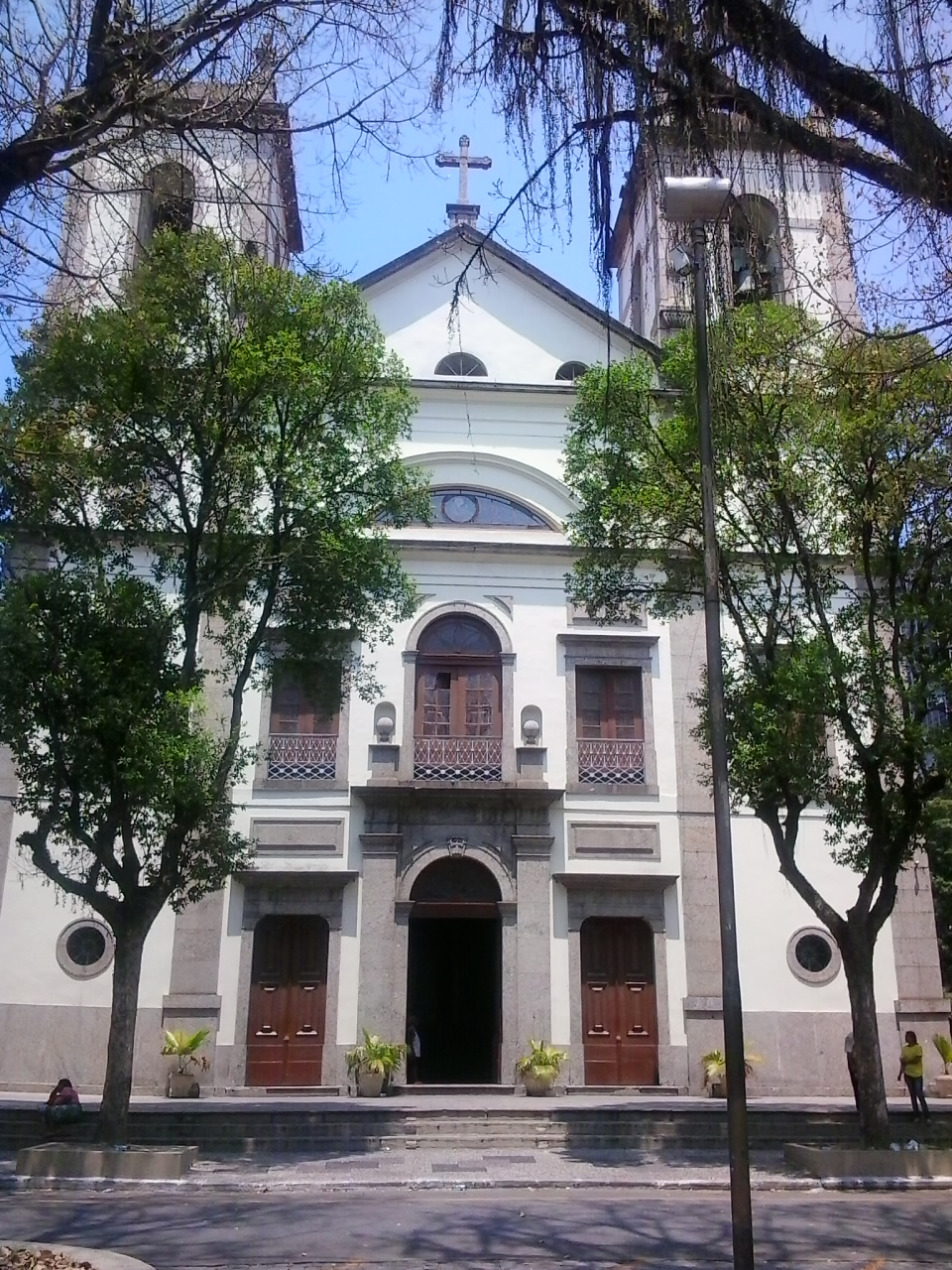
- Cathedral of São João in Niterói

- Coat of arms

Location
- Country: Brazil

Statistics
- Area: 4,453 km^{2} (1,719 sq mi)
- Population: Total; Catholics: (as of 2004); 2,094,288; 1,277,516 (61.0%)

Information
- Denomination: Catholic Church
- Sui iuris church: Latin Church
- Rite: Roman Rite
- Established: 27 April 1892 (134 years ago)
- Cathedral: Metropolitan Cathedral of St. John the Baptist

Current leadership
- Pope: Leo XIV
- Archbishop: José Rezende Francisco Dias
- Auxiliary Bishops: Geraldo de Paula Souza, C.Ss.R.
- Bishops emeritus: Alano Maria Pena, O.P.

Website
- www.arqnit.org.br

The Archdiocese of Niteroi (Nictheroy) (Latin: Archidioecesis Nictheroyensis) is a Latin Church ecclesiastical territory or archdiocese of the Catholic Church in the city of Niterói in Rio de Janeiro state, southeast Brazil. It is a metropolitan see.

Its archiepiscopal see is the Metropolitan Cathedral of St. John the Baptist, in downtown Niterói. The city also has the Minor Basilica of Nossa Senhora Auxiliadora, dedicated to Our Lady of Perpetual Help, and is set to complete a future cathedral by Guanabara Bay: the Nova Catedral São João Batista (New Cathedral of Saint Hohn the Baptist).

== History ==
- Established on April 27, 1892 as the Diocese of Niterói, on territory split off from the then-Diocese of São Sebastião do Rio de Janeiro (now Metropolitan)
- Lost territories repeatedly: on 1895.11.15: to establish the Diocese of Espírito Santo; on 1922.12.04 to establish the Diocese of Barra do Piraí and the Diocese of Campos (now its suffragan); on 1946.04.13 to establish the Diocese of Petropolis (now a suffragan)
- March 26, 1960: Elevated as Metropolitan Archdiocese of Niterói (Nictheroy; Nictheroyen[sis]), having lost territory to establish the Diocese of Nova Iguaçu.

== Statistics ==
As per 2014, it pastorally served 1,228,000 Catholics (53.8% of 2,283,000 total) on 4,728 km² in 77 parishes and 6 missions with 147 priests (105 diocesan, 42 religious), 75 deacons, 249 lay religious (50 brothers, 199 sisters) and 74 seminarians.

== Ecclesiastical Province ==
The suffragan sees in Niterói's ecclesiastical province are:

- Diocese of Campos
- Diocese of Nova Friburgo
- Diocese of Petrópolis

== Episcopal ordinaries, with auxiliary bishops listed alongside ==
Suffragan Bishops of Niterói

- Francisco do Rego Maia (1893.09.12 – 1901.06.05); next Bishop of Belém do Pará (Brazil) (1901.06.05 – 1906.04.03), emeritate ('promoted') as Titular Archbishop of Nicopolis (1906.04.03 – death 1928.02.04)
- João Francisco Braga (1902.04.09 – 1907.10.27); next last Suffragan Bishop of Curitiba (Brazil) (1907.10.27 – 1926.05.10), (see) promoted first Metropolitan Archbishop of Curitiba (1926.05.10 – 1935.06.22), emeritate as Titular Archbishop of Soteropolis (1935.06.22 – death 1937.10.13)
- Agostinho Francisco Benassi (1908.03.20 – death 1927.01.26)
- José Pereira Alves (1928.01.27 – death 1947.12.21), previously Bishop of Natal (Brazil; no Metropolitan) (1922.10.27 – 1928.01.27)
- José da Matha de Andrade y Amaral (1948.03.20 – death 1954.11.07), previously Bishop of Cajazeiras (Brazil) (1934.03.24 – 1941.05.12), Bishop of Amazonas (Brazil) (1941.05.12 – 1948.03.20)
  - Auxiliary Bishop: José de Almeida Batista Pereira (1953.12.22 – 1955.11.07), Titular Bishop of Baris in Pisidia (1953.12.22 – 1955.11.07); next Bishop of Sete Lagoas (Brazil) (1955.11.07 – 1964.04.02), Bishop of Guaxupé (Brazil) (1964.04.02 – retired 1976.01.16), died 2009

Metropolitan Archbishops of Niterói

- Carlos Gouvêa Coelho (1954.12.14 – 1960.04.23), previously Bishop of Nazaré (Brazil) (1948.01.10 – 1954.12.14); next Metropolitan Archbishop of Olinda e Recife (Brazil) (1960.04.23 – death 1964.03.07)
- Antônio de Almeida Moraes Junior (1960.04.23 – retired 1979.04.19), did 1984; previously Bishop of Montes Claros (Brazil) (1948.09.29 – 1951.11.17), Metropolitan Archbishop of Olinda e Recife (Brazil) (1951.11.17 – 1960.04.23)
- José Gonçalves da Costa, Redemptorists (C.Ss.R.) (1979.04.19 – retired 1990.05.09), died 2001; previously Titular Bishop of Rhodopolis (1962.06.25 – 1969.11.24) as Auxiliary Bishop of Archdiocese of São Sebastião do Rio de Janeiro (Brazil) (1962.06.25 – 1969.11.24), Secretary General of National Conference of Bishops of Brazil (1964 – 1968), Bishop of Presidente Prudente (Brazil) (1969.11.24 – 1975.08.19), Titular Archbishop of Ulcinj (1975.08.19 – 1979.04.19) as Coadjutor Archbishop of Niterói (1975.08.19 – succession 1979.04.19)
  - Auxiliary Bishop: Paulo Lopes de Faria (1980.11.07 – 1983.12.16), Titular Bishop of Thelepte (1980.11.07 – 1983.12.16); later Bishop of Itabuna (Brazil) (1983.12.16 – 1995.08.02), Coadjutor Archbishop of Diamantina (Brazil) (1995.08.02 – 1997.05.14), succeeding as Metropolitan Archbishop of Diamantina (1997.05.14 – retired 2007.05.30), died 2009
- Carlos Alberto Etchandy Gimeno Navarro (1990.05.09 – death 2003.02.02), previously Titular Bishop of Cenæ (1975.10.24 – 1981.08.29) as Auxiliary Bishop of Archdiocese of São Sebastião do Rio de Janeiro (Brazil) (1975.10.24 – 1981.08.29), Bishop of Campos (Brazil) (1981.08.29 – 1990.05.09)
- Alano Maria Pena, Order of Preachers (O.P.) (2003.09.24 – retired 2011.11.30), previously Titular Bishop of Vardimissa (1975.04.07 – 1978.05.26) as Auxiliary Bishop of Archdiocese of Belém do Pará (Brazil) (1975.04.07 – 1976.07.14) and as Coadjutor Bishop-Prelate of Marabá (Brazil) (1976.07.14 – 1976.11.10), succeeding as last Bishop-Prelate of Territorial Prelature of Marabá (Brazil) (1976.11.10 – 1979.10.16), (see) promoted first Bishop of Marabá (1979.10.16 – 1985.07.11), Bishop of Itapeva (Brazil) (1985.07.11 – 1993.11.24), Bishop of Nova Friburgo (Brazil) (1993.11.24 – 2003.09.24)
  - Auxiliary Bishop: Roberto Francisco Ferrería Paz (2007.12.19 – 2011.06.08), Titular Bishop of Accia (2007.12.19 – 2011.06.08); later Bishop of Campos (Brazil) (2011.06.08 – ...)
- José Rezende Francisco Dias (2011.11.30 - ...), previously Titular Bishop of Turres Ammeniæ (2001.03.28 – 2005.03.30) as Auxiliary Bishop of Archdiocese of Pouso Alegre (Brazil) (2001.03.28 – 2005.03.30), Bishop of Duque de Caxias (Brazil) (2005.03.30 – 2011.11.30)
  - Auxiliary Bishop: Luiz Antônio Lopes Ricci (2017.05.10 – 2020.05.06), Titular Bishop of Tindari; appointed Bishop of Nova Friburgo

== Sources and external links ==
- GCatholic.org data for all sections
- Catholic Hierarchy
- Archdiocese website (Portuguese)
