= Werner Franz Siebenbrock =

Brazilian Roman Catholic bishop (1937–2019)

Werner Franz Siebenbrock S.V.D.
- Bishop of Governador Valadares
- Church: Catholic Church
- Diocese: Diocese of Governador Valadares
- In office: 19 December 2001 – 6 March 2014
- Predecessor: José Gonçalves Heleno
- Successor: Antônio Carlos Félix
- Previous posts: Bishop of Nova Iguaçu (1994-2001); Titular Bishop of Tacia Montana (1988-1994); Auxiliary Bishop of Belo Horizonte (1988-1994)

Orders
- Ordination: 18 December 1965
- Consecration: 18 December 1988 by Serafim Fernandes de Araújo

Personal details
- Born: 27 September 1937 Münster, Gau Westphalia-North, Nazi Germany
- Died: 24 December 2019 (aged 82) Juiz de Fora, Minas Gerais, Brazil

Werner Franz Siebenbrock S.V.D. (27 September 1937 – 24 December 2019) was a Brazilian Roman Catholic bishop.

Siebenbrock was born in Germany and was ordained to the priesthood in 1965. He served as titular bishop of Tacia montana and as auxiliary bishop of the Roman Catholic Archdiocese of Belo Horizonte, Brazil, from 1988 to 1994. He served as bishop of the Roman Catholic Diocese of Nova Iguaçu, Brazil, from 1994 to 2001 and as bishop of the Roman Catholic Diocese of Governador Valadares, Brazil, from 2001 to 2014.
