= Silvestre Luís Scandián =

Brazilian Roman Catholic archbishop (1931–2019)

Silvestre Luís Scandian S.V.D.
- Archbishop of Vitória
- Church: Catholic Church
- Archdiocese: Archdiocese of Vitória
- In office: 27 April 1984 – 14 April 2004
- Predecessor: João Batista da Mota e Albuquerque
- Successor: Luiz Mancilha Vilela
- Previous posts: Coadjutor Archbishop of Vitória (1981-1984); Bishop of Araçuaí (1975-1981)

Orders
- Ordination: 3 August 1958
- Consecration: 22 February 1975 by Carmine Rocco

Personal details
- Born: 31 December 1931 Iconha, Espírito Santo, Republic of the United States of Brazil
- Died: 16 February 2019 (aged 87) Juiz de Fora, Minas Gerais, Brazil

Silvestre Luís Scandián (31 December 1931 – 16 February 2019) was a Brazilian Roman Catholic archbishop.

Scandián was born in Brazil and was ordained to the priesthood in 1958. He served as bishop of the Roman Catholic Diocese of Araçuaí, Brazil, from 1975 to 1981. He then served as coadjutor archbishop of the Roman Catholic Archdiocese of Vitória, Brazil, from 1981 to 1984 and was archbishop of the archdiocese from 1984 to 2004.
