= Diocese of Nova Iguaçu =

Catholic ecclesiastical territory

Diocese of Nova Iguaçu Dioecesis Neo–Iguassuensis

Catholic
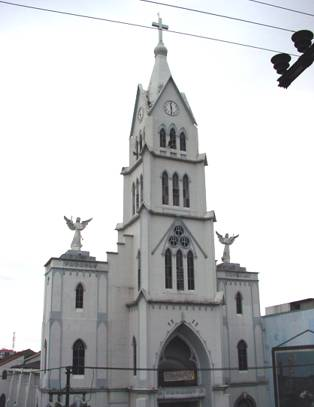
- Cathedral

Location
- Country: Brazil
- Ecclesiastical province: São Sebastião do Rio de Janeiro

Statistics
- Area: 983 km^{2} (380 sq mi)
- Population: Total; Catholics: (as of 2004); 1,755,770; 1,023,000 (58.3%)

Information
- Rite: Latin Rite
- Established: 26 March 1960 (66 years ago)
- Cathedral: Catedral Santo Antônio de Jacutinga

Current leadership
- Pope: Leo XIV
- Bishop: Gilson Andrade da Silva
- Metropolitan Archbishop: Orani João Tempesta, O. Cist.
- Bishops emeritus: Luciano Bergamin, C.R.L.

Website
- www.mitrani.org.br

The Roman Catholic Diocese of Nova Iguaçu (Latin: Dioecesis Neo–Iguassuensis) is a diocese located in the city of Nova Iguaçu in the ecclesiastical province of São Sebastião do Rio de Janeiro in Brazil.

== History ==
- 26 March 1960: Established as Diocese of Nova Iguaçu from the Diocese of Campos, Diocese of Niterói and Diocese of Valença

== Bishops ==
- Bishops of Nova Iguaçu (Roman rite), in reverse chronological order
  - Bishop Gilson Andrade da Silva (2019.05.15 - present)
  - Bishop Luciano Bergamin, C.R.L. (2002.07.24 – 2019.05.15)
  - Bishop Werner Franz Siebenbrock, S.V.D. (1994.11.09 – 2001.12.19), appointed Bishop of Governador Valadares, Minas Gerais
  - Bishop Adriano Mandarino Hypólito, O.F.M. (1966.08.29 – 1994.11.09)
  - Bishop Honorato Piazera, S.C.I. (1961.12.14 – 1966.02.12), appointed Coadjutor Bishop of Lages, Santa Catarina
  - Bishop Walmor Battú Wichrowski (1960.04.23 – 1961.05.31)

=== Coadjutor bishop ===
- Gilson Andrade da Silva (2018-2019)
