= Archdiocese of Vitória =

Catholic ecclesiastical territory

Coordinates: 20.3199°S 40.3372°W

Archdiocese of Vitória Archidioecesis Victoriensis Spiritus Sancti

Catholic
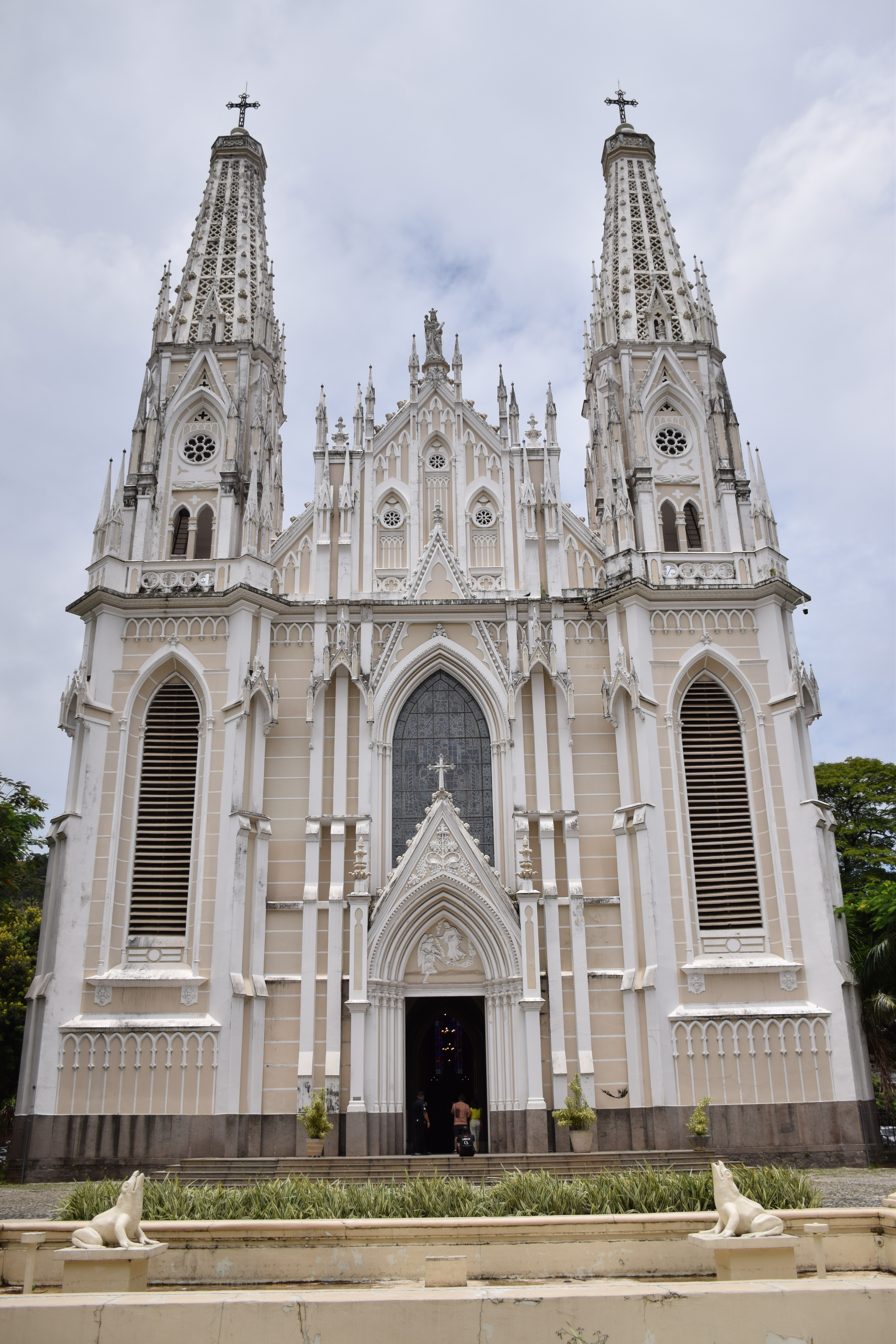
- Catedral Metropolitana Nossa Senhora da Vitória

Location
- Country: Brazil
- Ecclesiastical province: Vitória

Statistics
- Area: 7,234 km^{2} (2,793 sq mi)
- Population: Total; Catholics: (as of 2004); 2,983,150; 1,868,722 (62.6%)

Information
- Rite: Latin Rite
- Established: 15 November 1895 (130 years ago)
- Cathedral: Catedral Metropolitana Nossa Senhora da Vitória

Current leadership
- Pope: Leo XIV
- Archbishop: Ângelo Ademir Mezzari
- Auxiliary Bishops: Andherson Franklin Lustoza de Souza
- Bishops emeritus: Dario Campos

Website
- www.aves.org.br

The Roman Catholic Archdiocese of Vitória (Latin: Archidioecesis Victoriensis Spiritus Sancti) is an archdiocese located in the city of Vitória in Brazil.

== History ==
- 15 November 1895: Established as Diocese of Espírito Santo from the Diocese of Niterói
- 16 February 1958: Promoted as Metropolitan Archdiocese of Vitória

== Bishops ==
=== Ordinaries, in reverse chronological order ===
- Archbishops of Vitória, below
  - Ângelo Ademir Mezzari RCJ (2024.12.30 – present)
  - Dario Campos, OFM (2018.11.07 – 2024.12.30)
  - Luiz Mancilha Vilela, SSCC (2004.04.14 – 2018.11.07)
  - Silvestre Luís Scandián, SVD (1984.04.27 – 2004.04.14)
  - João Batista da Mota e Albuquerque (1958.05.26 – 1984.04.27)
  - João Batista da Mota e Albuquerque (1957.04.29 – 1958.05.26)
- Bishops of Espírito Santo, below
  - José Joaquim Gonçalves (1951.12.15 – 1957.03.14), appointed Auxiliary Bishop of Rio Preto, São Paulo
  - Luiz Scortegagna (1933.07.28 – 1951.12.01)
  - Benedito Paulo Alves de Souza (1918.01.28 – 1933.07.28)
  - Fernando de Souza Monteiro, CM (1901.08.21 – 1916.03.23)
  - João Batista Corrêa Nery (1896.08.29 – 1901.05.18), appointed Bishop of Pouso Alegre

=== Coadjutor bishops ===
- Luiz Scortegagna (1932-1933)
- Silvestre Luís Scandián, SVD (1981-1984)
- Luiz Mancilha Vilela, SSCC (2002-2004)

=== Auxiliary bishops ===
- José Joaquim Gonçalves (1951), appointed Bishop here
- Luís Gonzaga Fernandes (1955-1981), appointed Bishop of Campina Grande, Paraiba
- Geraldo Lyrio Rocha (1984-1990), appointed Bishop of Colatina, Espirito Santo
- João Braz de Aviz (1994-1998), appointed Bishop of Ponta Grossa, Parana; future Cardinal
- Odilon Guimarães Moreira (1999-2003), appointed Bishop of Itabira-Fabriciano, Minas Gerais
- Hélio Adelar Rubert (1999-2004), appointed Bishop of Santa Maria, Rio Grande do Sul
- Mário Marquez, OFMCap (2006-2010), appointed Bishop of Joaçaba, Santa Catarina
- José Aparecido Hergesse, CR (2011); did not take effect
- Joaquim Wladimir Lopes Dias (2011-2015), appointed Bishop of Colatina, Espirito Santo
- Rubens Sevilha, OCD (2011-2018), appointed Bishop of Bauru, São Paulo

=== Other priest of this diocese who became bishop ===
- Joaquim Mamede da Silva Leite, appointed Auxiliary Bishop of Campinas in 1916

== Suffragan dioceses ==
- Diocese of Cachoeiro de Itapemirim
- Diocese of Colatina
- Diocese of São Mateus

== Churches ==
- Our Lady of Victory Cathedral, Vitória

== Sources ==
- GCatholic.org
- Catholic Hierarchy
- Archdiocese website (Portuguese)
- Herbermann, Charles, ed. (1913). "Diocese of Spirito Santo" . Catholic Encyclopedia. New York: Robert Appleton Company.
