= Laudêmio of Petrópolis =

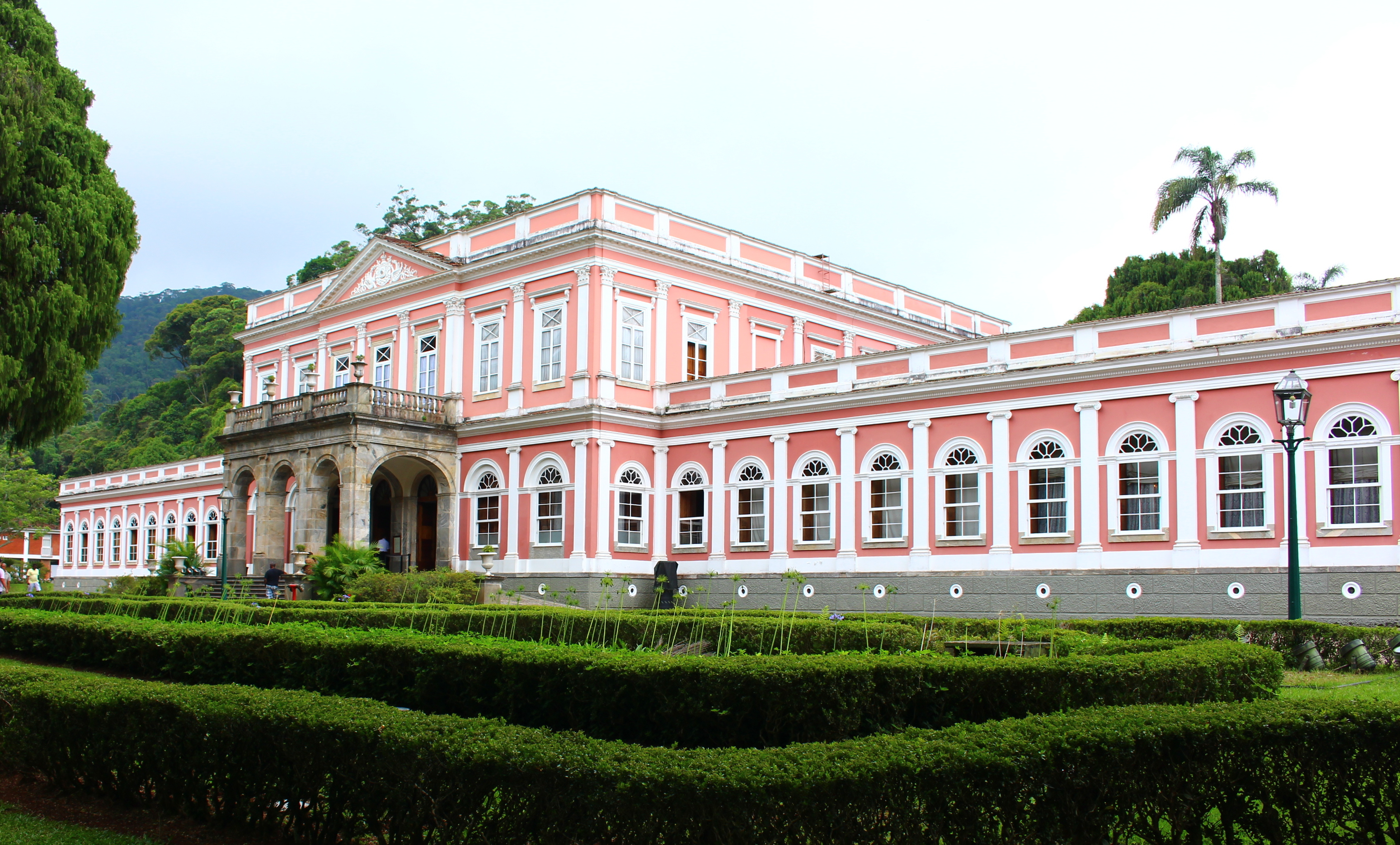
Palácio Imperial, the former summer palace of Emperor Pedro II, in Petrópolis.

The Laudêmio de Petrópolis or "Prince's Tax" is a laudemium, i.e. a legal right, which establishes a tax to be paid to the descendants of the Petrópolis Branch of Prince Pedro de Alcântara, which includes Pedro Carlos de Orléans-Braganza and Duarte Pio, Duke of Braganza. The tax to be paid to the descendants of the former owners of the lands of Fazenda Córrego Seco, located in the Brazilian municipality of Petrópolis.

This fee, incorrectly confused with a tax, corresponds to 2.5 per cent of the value of property purchase transactions in the area, and must be paid in cash to the Companhia Imobiliária de Petrópolis, an entity administered by the descendants of the Petrópolis Branch. Otherwise, the buyer, who is responsible for paying the fee, will not receive the definitive deed for the property purchased.

The laudemium is levied on properties in the 1st district of Petrópolis, the city centre, located in the area corresponding to the Fazenda do Córrego Seco. In the 19th century, Emperor Pedro II parcelled out the land, ceding the exploitation of the area to third parties who, in return, paid a fee to the imperial family every time the property changed hands. The heirs of the imperial family challenged the right to pay the laudemium in court, as the Córrego Seco farm was the family's private property, i.e. it did not belong to the Brazilian state.

One detail is that the Vassouras Branch no longer has a stake in this right, as they sold their share of the inheritance to members of the Petrópolis Branch, who run and manage the Petrópolis Real Estate Company (Companhia Imobiliária de Petrópolis).

== Historical context ==
Many families and institutions throughout Brazil are entitled to laudemium. Any landowner who, instead of selling their land or renting it out, gives it away by means of an emphyteusis, may be entitled to laudemium. It is also very common for organisations of the Roman Catholic Church to have emphyteuses, as they were large landowners and, in order to develop them, created various emphyteuses. Examples of institutions that receive emphyteusis are the Hospital dos Lázaros, the Convent of Santa Teresa, the Municipality of Rio de Janeiro, and the State of Rio de Janeiro, among others.

The descendants of the imperial family, who receive the rent and laudemium on parts of Petrópolis, receive this at their own expense. During the imperial period, the imperial family bought a farm, with their own money, called "Fazenda Córrego Seco". Emperor Pedro I, then Emperor of Brazil, tried to buy a farm called "Padre Correia", but his heirs would not agree to sell it to him. He ended up buying a neighbouring farm, Córrego Seco, which at the time belonged to Sergeant Major José Vieira Afonso. He bought the property for twenty contos de réis, a price considered too high for the real value of the farm. The deed for the purchase of the property by the then emperor was signed in 1830. The monarch - who after becoming emperor in Brazil was acclaimed King in Portugal - also bought other properties in the surrounding area, in Alto da Serra, Quitandinha and Retiro, expanding the area of his farm.

Later, his son, Emperor Pedro II, instead of parceling out the farm and selling it in lots, decided to set up enfiteuses with the aim of developing the town. As well as founding a town, he also invested in the locality.

On 16 March 1843, Pedro II, who was eighteen years old and newly married to Empress Teresa Cristina, signed the document that leased the lands of the Córrego Seco farm to Major Koeler for the foundation of what he called the "Povoação-Palácio de Petrópolis", in which he established the collection of emphyteusis from the settlers living in the region, among other things.

The emphyteusis generates less immediate money than selling or renting. Although it generates tiny amounts of rent, it generates the 2.5 per cent of each sale.

The imperial family lost access to and use of the Brazilian state's possessions with the Proclamation of the Republic of Brazil on 15 November 1889, but managed to regain rights to part of their private property. The property of Fazenda Córrego Seco - now part of Petrópolis - belonged absolutely and demonstrably to the family, and was not part of the assets of the Brazilian state. For this reason, the descendants of the Brazilian imperial family were able to recover the rights to the emphyteusis, which is only a right over private property, i.e. it is valid regardless of who owns it.

The Vassouras Branch of the Brazilian imperial family no longer has a stake in the issue of land rents and lauds, since Pedro Henrique de Orleans e Bragança sold his share to his relatives from the Petrópolis Branch, who run and manage the Petrópolis Real Estate Company.

In 2022 number of bills were tabled before the Chamber of Deputies proposing the extinction of laudêmio in the municipality of Petrópolis. However, as of 2023 this tax was still in force.
