= Diocese of Petrópolis =

Catholic ecclesiastical territory

Diocese of Petrópolis Dioecesis Petropolitanus

Catholic
- Metropolitan Cathedral of St. John the Baptist

Location
- Country: Brazil
- Ecclesiastical province: Niterói

Statistics
- Area: 3,075 km^{2} (1,187 sq mi)
- Population: Total; Catholics: (as of 2004); 760,000; 595,000 (78.3%)

Information
- Rite: Latin Rite
- Established: 13 April 1946 (80 years ago)
- Cathedral: Catedral São Pedro de Alcântara

Current leadership
- Pope: Leo XIV
- Bishop: Vacant
- Metropolitan Archbishop: José Rezende Francisco Dias

Website
- www.diocesepetropolis.org.br

The Roman Catholic Diocese of Petrópolis (Latin: Dioecesis Petropolitanus) is a diocese located in the city of Petrópolis in the ecclesiastical province of Niterói in Brazil.

== History ==
- April 13, 1946: Established as Diocese of Petrópolis from the Diocese of Barra do Piraí and Diocese of Niterói.

== Bishops ==
- Bishops of Petrópolis (Roman rite):
  - Manuel Pedro da Cunha Cintra † (3 January 1948 - 15 February 1984) Retired
  - José Fernandes Veloso † (15 February 1984 - 15 November 1995) Retired
  - José Carlos de Lima Vaz, S.J. † (15 November 1995 - 12 May 2004) Retired
  - Filippo Santoro (12 May 2004 - 21 November 2011) Appointed, Archbishop of Taranto
  - Gregório (Leozírio) Paixão Neto, O.S.B. (10 October 2012 – 15 December 2023) Appointed, Archbishop of Fortaleza

=== Coadjutor bishop ===
- José Fernandes Veloso (1981-1984)

=== Auxiliary bishop ===
- José Fernandes Veloso (1966-1981), appointed Coadjutor here

=== Other priests of this diocese who became bishops ===
- Paulo Francisco Machado, appointed Auxiliary Bishop of Juiz de Fora, Minas Gerais in 2004
- Gilson Andrade da Silva, appointed Auxiliary Bishop of São Salvador da Bahia in 2011
