= Diocese of Araçuaí =

Catholic ecclesiastical territory

Coordinates: 16.8500°S 42.0700°W

Diocese of Araçuaí Dioecesis Arassuahyensis Diocese de Araçuaí

Location
- Country: Brazil
- Ecclesiastical province: Diamantina
- Metropolitan: Diamantina

Statistics
- Area: 23,526 km^{2} (9,083 sq mi)
- Population: Total; Catholics: (as of 2012); 420,000; 280,000 (66.7%)

Information
- Denomination: Catholic Church
- Rite: Latin Rite
- Established: 25 August 1913 (112 years ago)
- Cathedral: Cathedral of St Joseph in Araçuaí

Current leadership
- Pope: Leo XIV
- Bishop: Geraldo dos Reis Maia
- Metropolitan Archbishop: Darci José Nicioli
- Bishops emeritus: Marcello Romano; Esmeraldo Barreto de Farias

Website
- diocesedearacuai.com.br

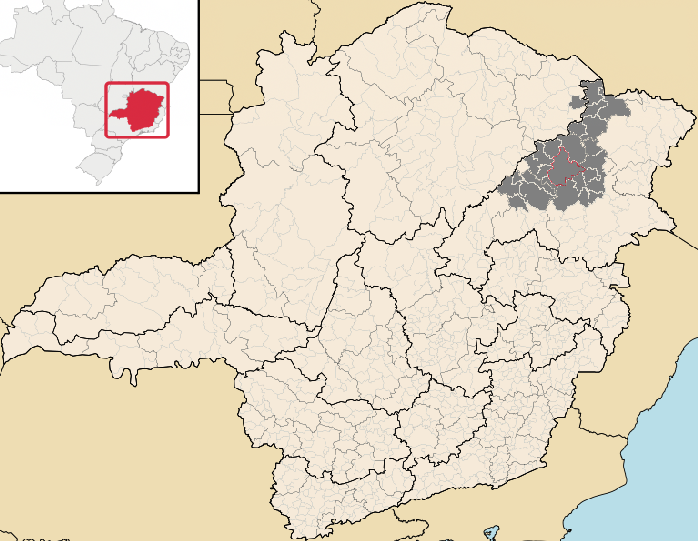
Diocese of Araçuaí.

The Roman Catholic Diocese of Araçuaí (Latin: Dioecesis Arassuahyensis) is a diocese located in the city of Araçuaí in the ecclesiastical province of Diamantina in Brazil. The mother church is the Cathedral of Saint Joseph in Araçuaí. As of 2025, the bishop of Araçuaí is Geraldo dos Reis Maia.

== History ==
In August 1913, the Diocese of Araçuaí was created as part of the territorial reorganization of the Diocese of Diamantina. The initiative of Joaquim Silvério de Sousa led to the establishment of the dioceses of Montes Claros and Araçuaí with the approval of Pope Pius X. The first bishop, Serafim Gomes Jardim, was appointed in 1914. His successor, José de Haas, became the second bishop in 1937 and was known for his dedication and pastoral visits on horseback, which covered the entire diocese every five years, even as he aged. He died in 1956 and was succeeded by José Maria Pires.

The diocese continued to grow under the leadership of new bishops. José Maria Pires, for example, founded the first minor seminary and ordained the diocese's first two priests before being transferred. Altivo Pacheco Ribeiro was responsible for implementing the reforms of the Second Vatican Council. Later, Crescenzio Rinaldini, known as Dom Enzo, focused on education and established a television station. The diocese's history continued with the appointments of Dario Campos, Severino Clasen, and in 2012, Marcello Romano, marking the continuity of local religious life.

In 2020, Marcello Romano resigned and the bishop of Almenara, José Carlos Brandão Cabral, was appointed apostolic administrator of the diocese of Araçuaí. In the same year, Esmeraldo Barreto de Farias was appointed bishop of Araçuaí and sworn in on February 6, 2021, holding the position until his resignation on April 30, 2024. In the same year, Geraldo dos Reis Maia was appointed bishop of Araçuaí and inaugurated on August 17, 2024.

== Bishops ==
- Bishops of Araçuaí (Latin Rite)
  - Serafim Gomes Jardim da Silva (1914.03.12 – 1934.05.26), appointed Archbishop of Diamantina, Minas Gerais
  - José de Haas, O.F.M. (1937.03.20 – 1956.08.01)
  - José Maria Pires (1957.05.25 – 1965.12.02), appointed Archbishop of Paraíba
  - Altivo Pacheco Ribeiro (1966.06.27 – 1973.11.10)
  - Silvestre Luís Scandián, S.V.D. (1975.01.04 – 1981.08.18), appointed Coadjutor Archbishop of Vitória, Espirito Santo
  - Crescênzio Rinaldini (1982.05.10 – 2001.08.08)
  - Dario Campos, O.F.M. (2001.08.08 – 2004.06.23), appointed Bishop of Leopoldina, Minas Gerais; future Archbishop
  - Severino Clasen, O.F.M. (2005.05.11 – 2011.07.06), appointed Bishop of Caçador, Santa Catarina
  - Marcello Romano (2012.06.13 – 2020.03.25)
  - Esmeraldo Barreto de Farias (2021.02.06 – 2024.04.30)
  - Geraldo dos Reis Maia (2024.08.17 – present)

=== Coadjutor bishop ===
- Dario Campos, O.F.M. (2000–2001)
