= Comboni Missionaries =

The term Comboni Missionaries can refer to either of two religious orders founded by Saint Daniele Comboni:

- Comboni Missionaries of the Heart of Jesus
- Comboni Missionary Sisters
