= Waldyr Calheiros Novaes =

- Bishop of the Diocese of Barra do Piraí-Volta Redonda Emeritus
- Church: Roman Catholic Church
- See: Diocese of Barra do Piraí-Volta Redonda
- In office: 1966 - 1999
- Predecessor: Altivo Pacheco Ribeiro
- Successor: João Maria Messi

Orders
- Ordination: July 25, 1948
- Consecration: 1 May 1964 by Jaime de Barros Câmara

Personal details
- Born: July 29, 1923 Murici, Alagoas, Brazil
- Died: November 30, 2013 (aged 90) Volta Redonda, Rio de Janeiro, Brazil

Waldyr Calheiros Novaes (July 29, 1923 – November 30, 2013) was a Brazilian prelate of the Catholic Church.

Waldyr Calheiros Novaes was born in Murici, Alagoas, and ordained a priest on July 25, 1948. Novaes was appointed auxiliary bishop of the Diocese of São Sebastião do Rio de Janeiro as well as Titular Bishop of Mulia on February 25, 1964, and was ordained bishop on May 1, 1964. Novaes was appointed bishop of the Diocese of Barra do Piraí-Volta Redonda on October 20, 1966, where Novaes served until his retirement on November 17, 1999.

He died November 30, 2013, at a hospital, of a lung infection.

== See also ==
- Diocese of ão Sebastião do Rio de Janeiro
- Diocese of Barra do Piraí-Volta Redonda
