= Diocese of Barra do Piraí-Volta Redonda =

Catholic ecclesiastical territory

Coordinates: 22.4647°S 43.8316°W

Diocese of Barra do Piraí–Volta Redonda Dioecesis Barrensis de Pirai–Voltaredondensis

Catholic
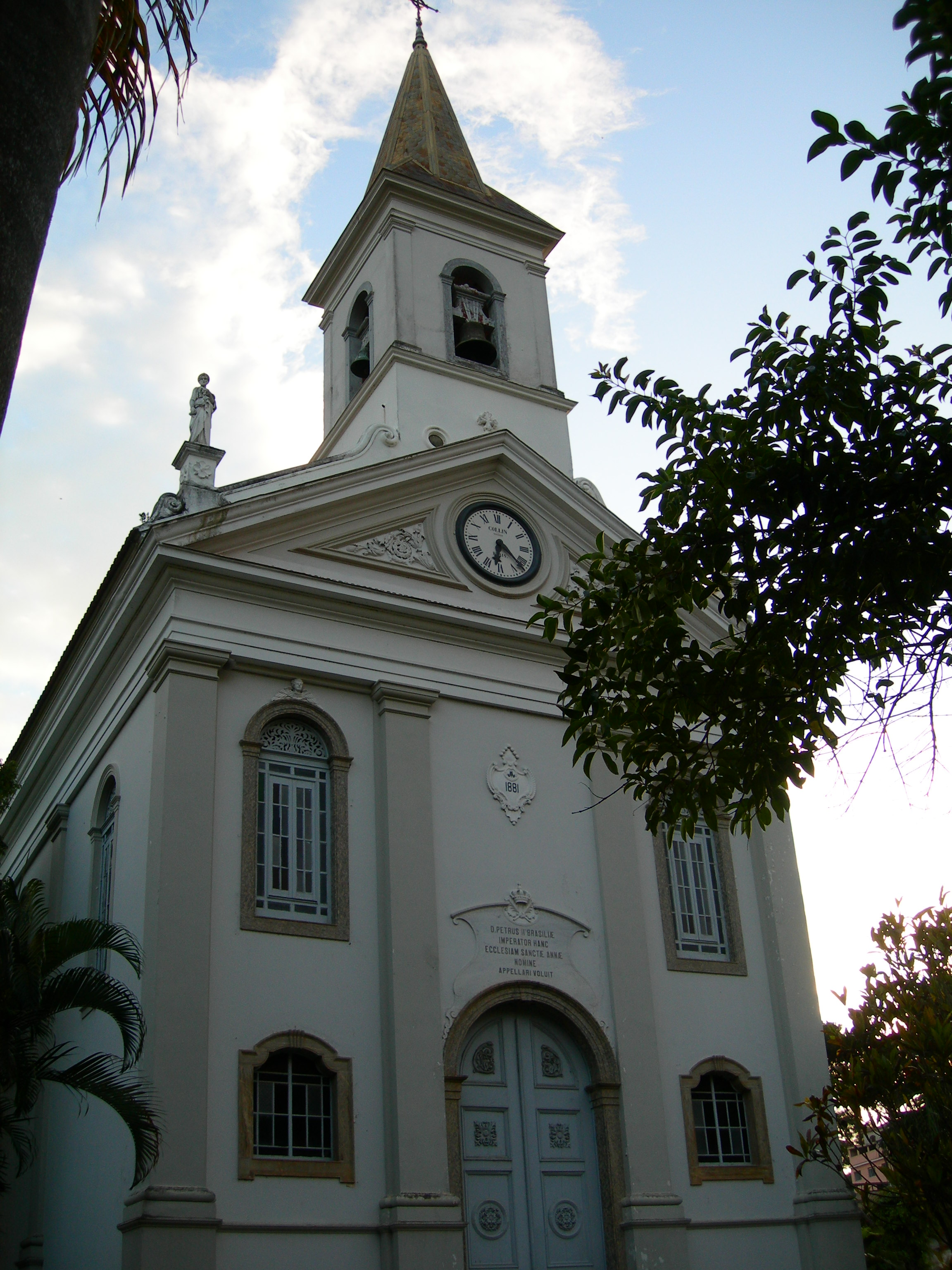
- Cathedral of St. Ann

Location
- Country: Brazil
- Ecclesiastical province: São Sebastião do Rio de Janeiro

Statistics
- Area: 4,768 km^{2} (1,841 sq mi)
- Population: Total; Catholics: (as of 2004); 742,034; 556,525 (75.0%)

Information
- Rite: Latin Rite
- Established: 4 December 1922 (103 years ago)
- Cathedral: Catedral Sant’Ana, Barra do Piraí

Current leadership
- Pope: Leo XIV
- Bishop: Luiz Henrique da Silva Brito
- Metropolitan Archbishop: Orani João Tempesta, O. Cist.
- Bishops emeritus: João Maria Messi, O.S.M. Francesco Biasin

Website
- www.diocesevr.com.br

The Roman Catholic Diocese of Barra do Piraí–Volta Redonda (Latin: Dioecesis Barrensis de Pirai–Voltaredondensis) is a diocese located in the cities of Barra do Piraí and Volta Redonda in the ecclesiastical province of São Sebastião do Rio de Janeiro in Brazil.

== History ==
- 4 December 1922: Established as Diocese of Barra do Piraí from the Diocese of Niterói
- 26 January 1965: Renamed as Diocese of Barra do Piraí–Volta Redonda

== Bishops ==
- Bishops of Barra do Piraí (Latin Rite)
  - Guilherme Müller (1925.12.14 – 1935.12.11)
  - José André Coimbra (1938.02.26 – 1955.06.08), appointed Bishop of Patos de Minas, Minas Gerais
  - Agnelo Rossi (1956.03.05 – 1962.09.06), appointed Archbishop of Ribeirão Preto, São Paulo; future Cardinal
  - Altivo Pacheco Ribeiro (1963.04.04 – 1965.01.26)
- Bishops of Barra do Piraí-Volta Redonda (Latin Rite)
  - Altivo Pacheco Ribeiro (1965.01.26 – 1966.06.27), appointed Bishop of Araçuaí (Arassuaí), Minas Gerais
  - Waldyr Calheiros Novaes (1966.10.20 – 1999.11.17)
  - João Maria Messi, O.S.M. (1999.11.17 – 2011.06.08, retired)
  - Francesco Biasin (2011.06.08 – 2013.03.13)
  - Luiz Henrique da Silva Brito (2013.03.13 - present)

=== Auxiliary bishop ===
- Vital João Geraldo Wilderink, O. Carm. (1978-1980), appointed Bishop of Itaguaí, Rio de Janeiro
