= Diocese of Caratinga =

Catholic ecclesiastical territory

Coordinates: 19.7902°S 42.1396°W

Diocese of Caratinga Dioecesis Caratingensis

Catholic
- St. John the Baptist Cathedral, Caratinga

Location
- Country: Brazil
- Ecclesiastical province: Mariana

Statistics
- Area: 15,088 km^{2} (5,826 sq mi)
- Population: Total; Catholics: (as of 2023); 722,300; 511,000 (70.7%)
- Parishes: 58

Information
- Denomination: Catholic Church
- Sui iuris church: Latin Church
- Rite: Roman Rite
- Established: 15 December 1915; 110 years ago
- Cathedral: St. John the Baptist Cathedral, Caratinga
- Secular priests: 106 (75 Diocesan, 31 Religious Orders)

Current leadership
- Pope: Leo XIV
- Bishop: Juarez Delorto Secco
- Metropolitan Archbishop: Airton José dos Santos
- Bishops emeritus: Emanuel Messias de Oliveira

Map
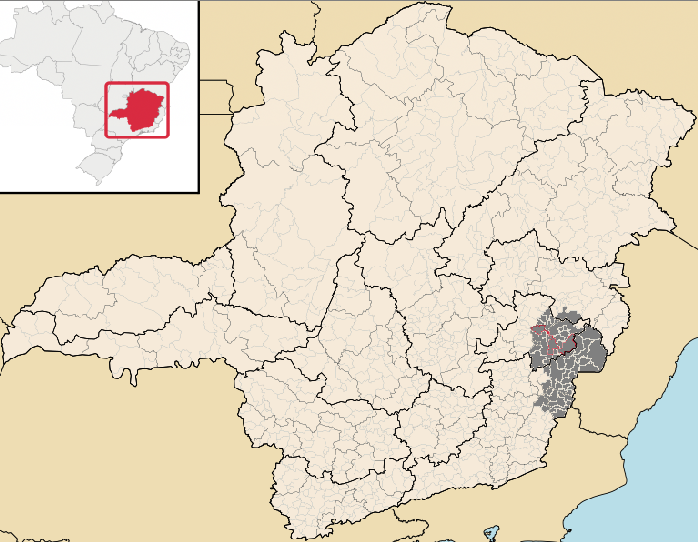

Website
- www.diocesecaratinga.org.br

The Roman Catholic Diocese of Caratinga (Latin: Dioecesis Caratingensis) is a diocese located in the city of Caratinga in the ecclesiastical province of Mariana in Brazil.

== History ==
- 15 December 1915: Established as Diocese of Caratinga from the Diocese of Amazonas

== Bishops ==
Bishops of Caratinga (Roman rite)

- Joaquim Mamede da Silva Leite † (28 January 1918), did not take effect
- Manuel Nogueira Duarte † (4 April 1918 – 1919), resigned
- Carloto Fernandes da Silva Távora † (18 December 1919 – 29 November 1933)
- José Maria Parreira Lara † (28 September 1934 – 8 August 1936)
- João Batista Cavati, C.M. † (30 July 1938 – 20 October 1956), resigned
- José Eugênio Corrêa † (19 August 1957 – 27 November 1978), resigned
- Hélio Gonçalves Heleno † (27 November 1978 – 16 February 2011), retired
- Emanuel Messias de Oliveira (16 February 2011 – 13 December 2023), retired
- Juarez Delorto Secco (13 December 2023 – Present)

=== Other priests of this diocese who became bishops ===
- Odilon Guimarães Moreira (1969-1999), appointed Auxiliary Bishop of Vitória, Espirito Santo
- Aldo di Cillo Pagotto, S.S.S. (1977-1985)
- Paulo Mendes Peixoto (1979-2005), appointed Bishop of São José do Rio Preto, São Paulo
- José Moreira Bastos Neto (1979-2009), appointed Bishop of Três Lagoas, Mato Grosso do Sul
