= Ritápolis =

Municipality in Minas Gerais, Brazil

- Municipality
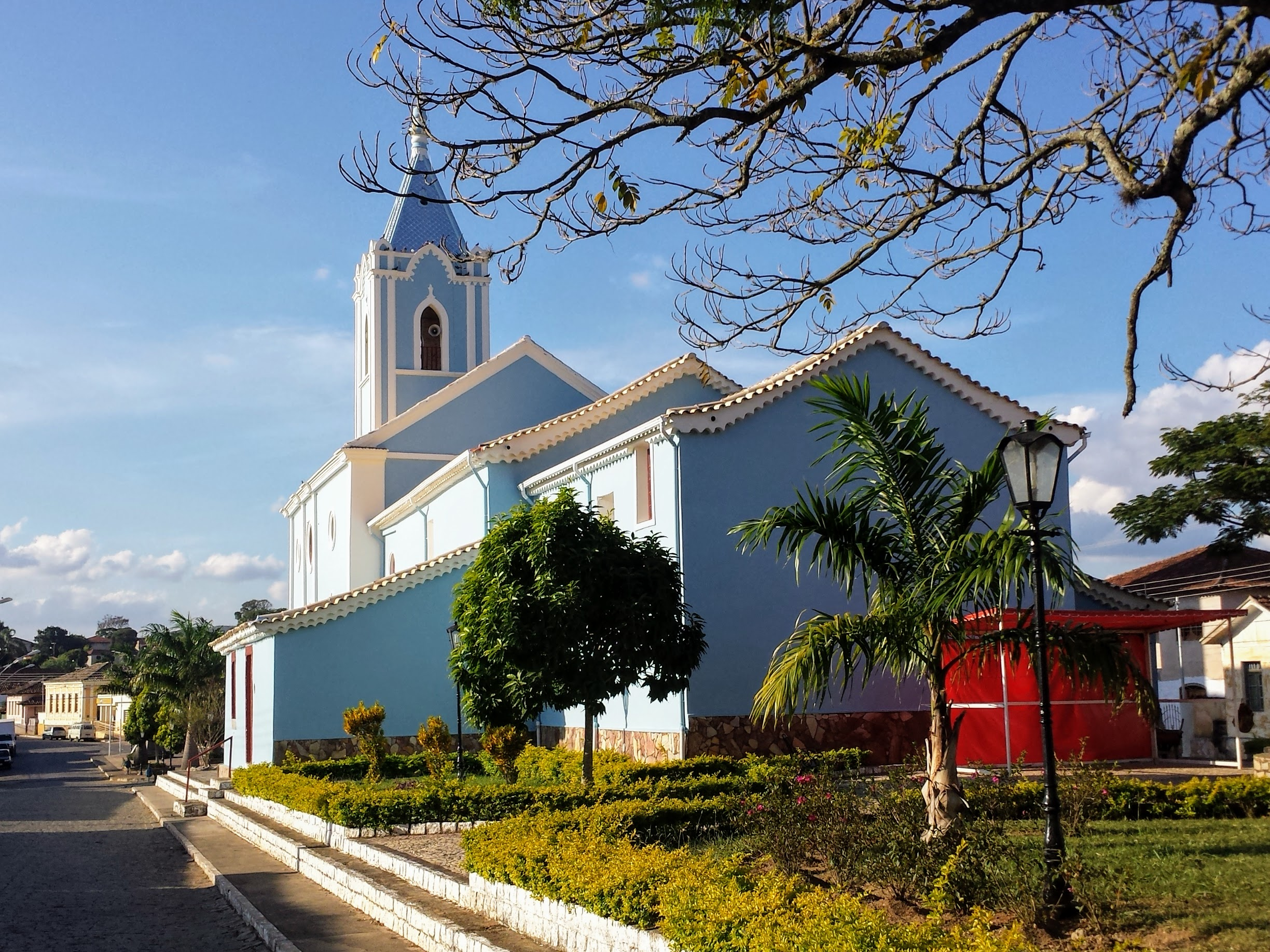
- Sanctuary of Saint Rita of Cascia

- Location in Minas Gerais

- Location in Brazil
- Coordinates: 21°01′19″S 44°19′04″W
- Country: Brazil
- Region: Southeast
- State: Minas Gerais
- Intermediate region: Barbacena
- Immediate region: São João del-Rei
- Municipality: 30 December 1962

Area
  - Total: 404.805 km^{2} (156.296 sq mi)

Population (2022)
  - Total: 4,994
  - Density: 12.34/km^{2} (31.95/sq mi)
- Demonym: Ritapolitano
- Time zone: UTC−3 (BRT)
- Website: www.ritapolis.mg.gov.br

Location of Ritápolis within Minas Gerais

Ritápolis is a Brazilian municipality located in the state of Minas Gerais. The city belongs to the mesoregion of Campo das Vertentes and to the microregion of São João del-Rei. In 2022, the estimated population was 4,994.

The municipality contains part of Ritápolis National Forest, including the ruins of Fazenda do Pombal, a protected historic site associated with the birthplace and early life of Tiradentes.

== Geography ==
According to IBGE (2017), the municipality belongs to the Immediate Geographic Region of São João del-Rei, in the Intermediate Geographic Region of Barbacena. The municipality contains part of the Ritápolis National Forest.

=== Climate ===
Under the Köppen classification Ritapolis presents a humid subtropical climate (Cwb). The annual average lies around 19 degrees Celsius. The lowest temperature ever recorded is 0.1 degrees in July 18th 2000, during a cold wave. The historical maximum lies at 36.9 degrees, recorded on October 24th, 2023.

== History and heritage ==
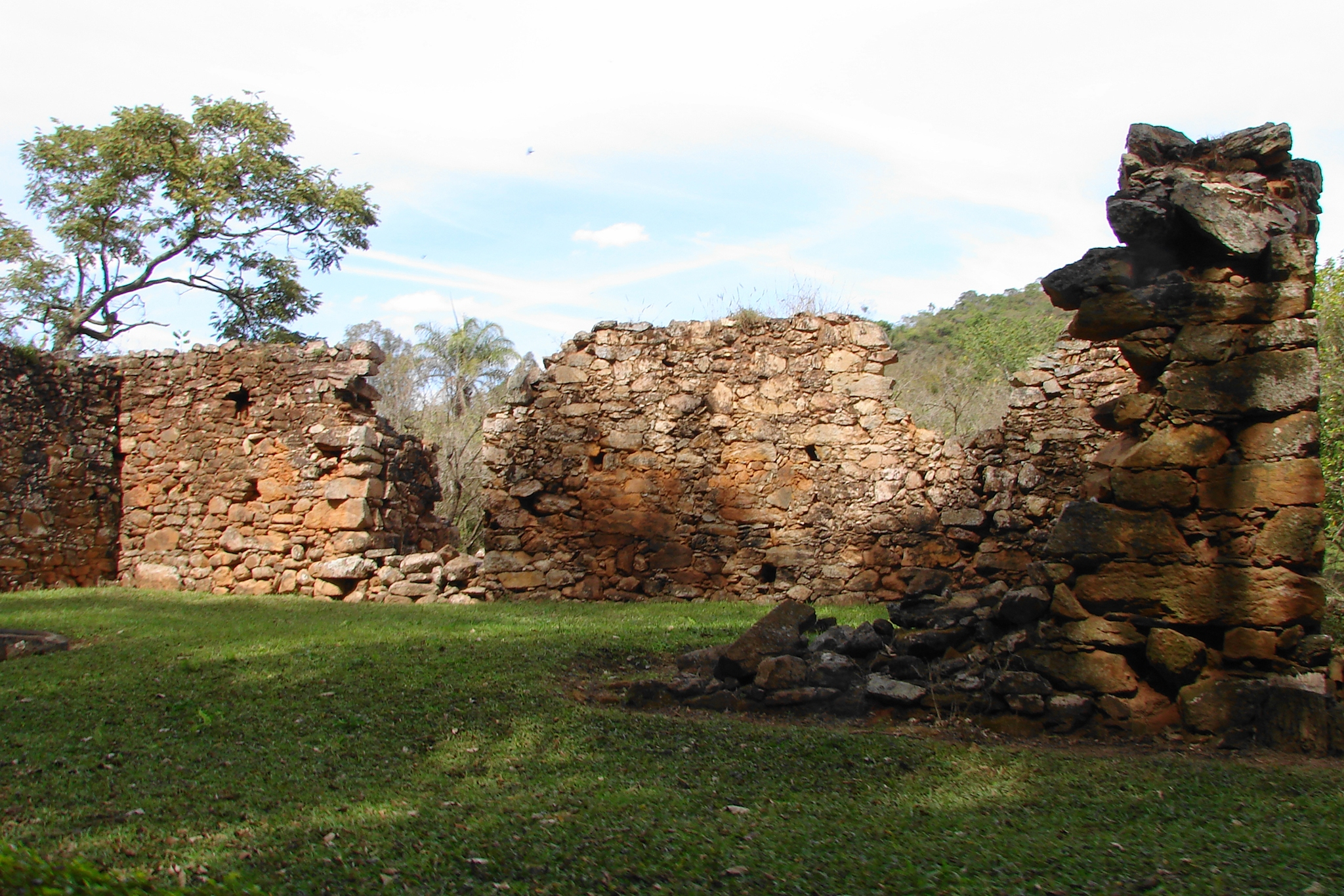
Ruins at Fazenda do Pombal, associated with the early life of Tiradentes

The municipality includes Fazenda do Pombal, a former rural estate on the right bank of the Rio das Mortes. The site is associated with Joaquim José da Silva Xavier, better known as Tiradentes, who was born there in 1746 and lived at Pombal during his childhood.

The surviving ruins include remains of the old estate and sugar mill. The area was entered into the federal heritage-protection process in September 1971. The area is now part of Ritápolis National Forest, administered by the Instituto Chico Mendes de Conservação da Biodiversidade (ICMBio).

== Ecclesiastical circumscription ==
The municipality is part of the Roman Catholic Diocese of São João del-Rei.

== See also ==
- Fazenda do Pombal
- List of municipalities in Minas Gerais
