= Piedade do Rio Grande =

Coordinates: 21°28′S 44°12′W

- Municipality
- Municipality of Piedade do Rio Grande
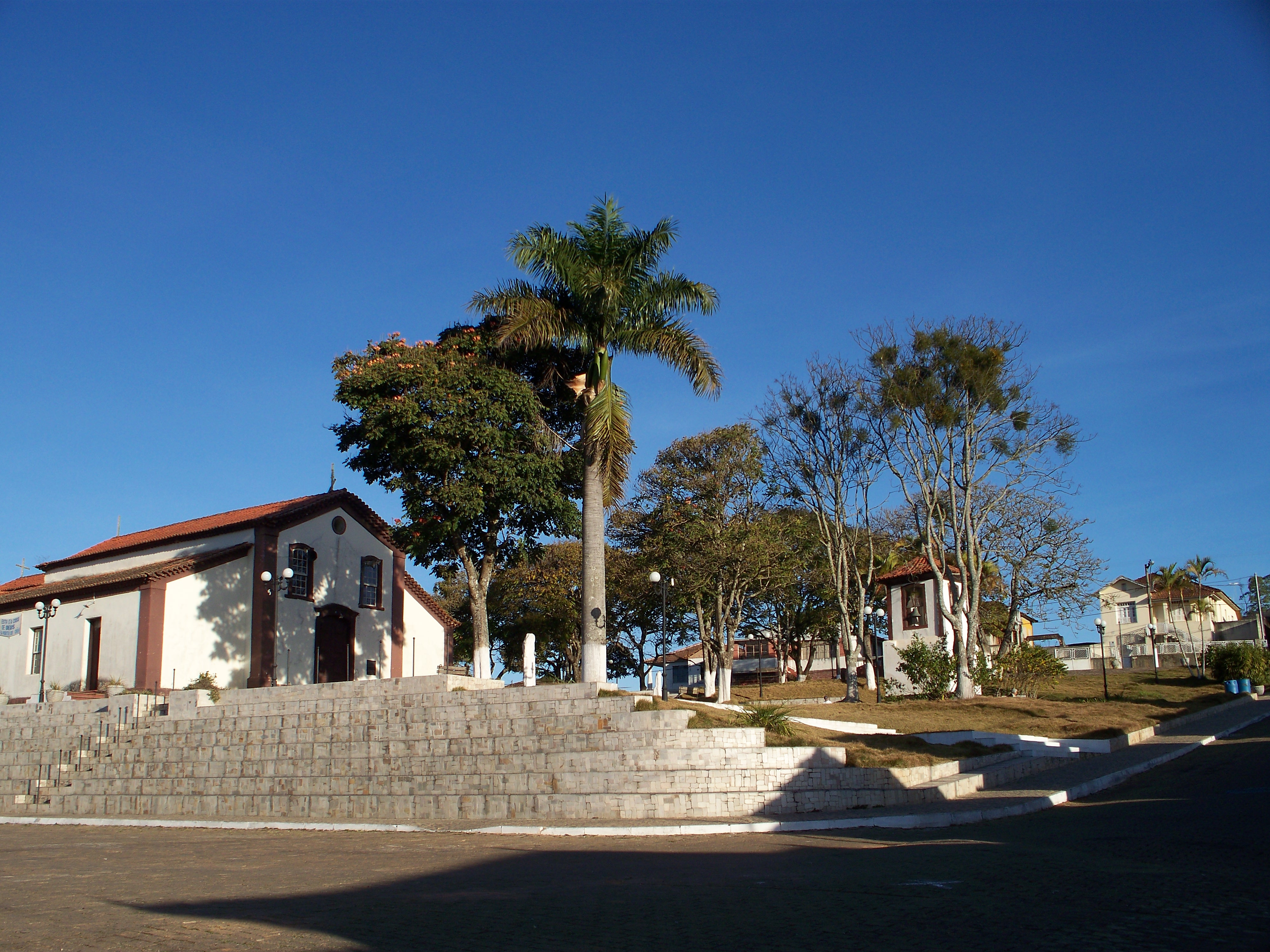

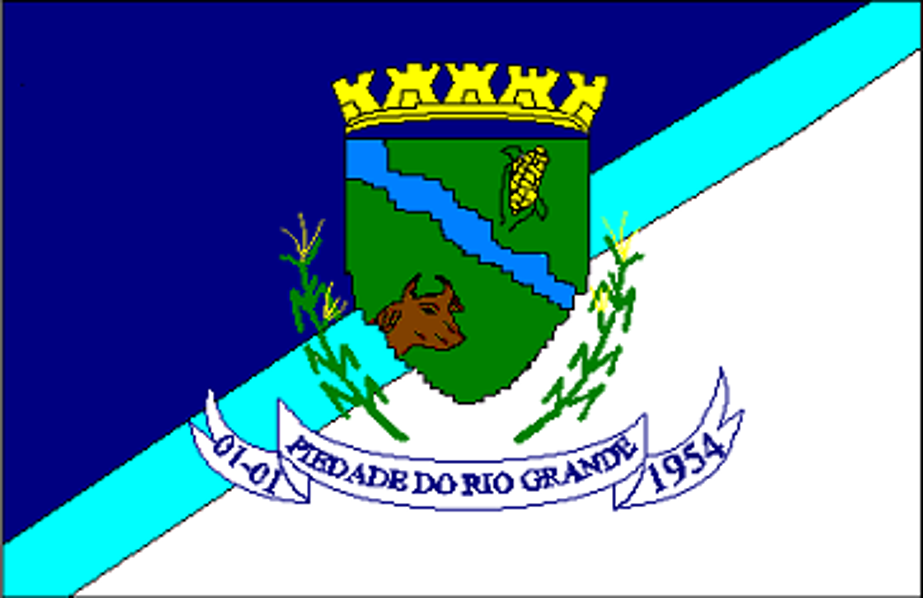
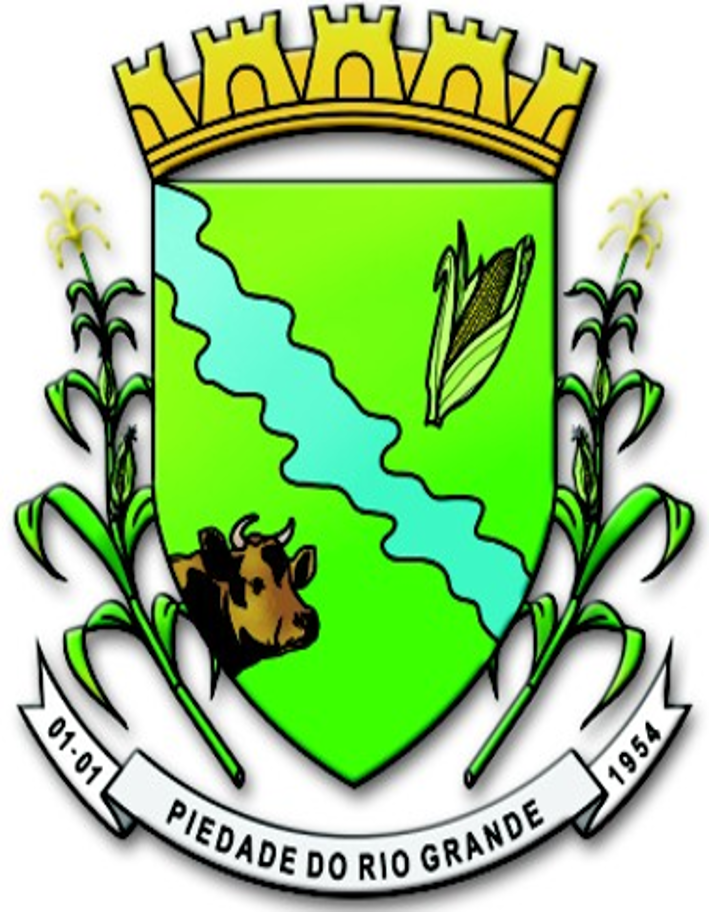
- Flag Coat of arms

- Location in Minas Gerais
- Country: Brazil
- State: Minas Gerais
- Region: Southeast
- Intermediate Region: Barbacena
- Immediate Region: São João del-Rei
- Founded: 12 December 1953

Government
  - Mayor: José Fernandes Neto (MDB)

Area
  - Total: 322.814 km^{2} (124.639 sq mi)

Population (2022 Census)
  - Total: 4,604
  - Estimate (2025): 4,694
  - Density: 14.26/km^{2} (36.94/sq mi)
- Demonym: piedadense
- Time zone: UTC−3 (BRT)
- Postal Code: 36227-000 a 36229-999
- HDI (2010): 0.678 – medium
- Website: piedadedoriogrande.mg.gov.br

Piedade do Rio Grande is a Brazilian municipality located in the state of Minas Gerais. The city belongs to the mesoregion of Campo das Vertentes and to the microregion of Sao Joao del Rei. In 2025, the estimated population was 4,694.

== Geography ==
According to IBGE (2017), the municipality belongs to the Immediate Geographic Region of São João del-Rei, in the Intermediate Geographic Region of Barbacena.

=== Ecclesiastical circumscription ===
The municipality is part of the Roman Catholic Diocese of São João del-Rei.

== See also ==
- List of municipalities in Minas Gerais
