= Conceição da Barra de Minas =

Town and municipality in the state of Minas Gerais, Brazil

Coordinates: 21°07′44″S 44°28′19″W

- Municipality
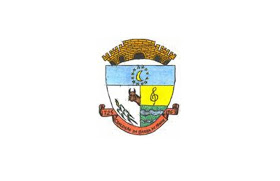
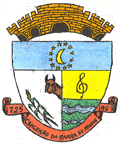
- Flag Coat of arms
- Interactive map of Conceição da Barra de Minas
- Country: Brazil
- State: Minas Gerais
- Region: Southeast

Population (2022 Census)
  - Total: 3,560
  - Estimate (2025): 3,576
- Time zone: UTC−3 (BRT)

Location of Conceição da Barra de Minas within Minas Gerais

Conceição da Barra de Minas is a Brazilian municipality located in the state of Minas Gerais. The city belongs to the mesoregion of Campo das Vertentes and to the microregion of Sao Joao del Rei. In 2025, the estimated population was 3,576.

== Geography ==
According to IBGE (2017), the municipality belongs to the Immediate Geographic Region of São João del-Rei, in the Intermediate Geographic Region of Barbacena.

=== Ecclesiastical circumscription ===
The municipality is part of the Roman Catholic Diocese of São João del-Rei.

== History ==
The region of Conceição da Barra de Minas was first cleared by Fernão Dias Paes, who arrived at Boa Vista while searching for emerald deposits. He set up camp there, and began the agricultural development in the area, which led to the establishment of a small village there. In 1725, work began on the construction of the cathedral of Nossa Senhora da Conceição, around which the first houses of the actual municipality were constructed.

Conceição da Barra de Minas, originally a subordinate district of the municipality of São João del Rei, was upgraded to the category of municipality under the name Cassiterita in 1962, and was renamed Conceição da Barra in 1989

== Economy ==
Agriculture, particularly dairy-processing, is the main economic industry in Conceição da Barra de Minas. In addition to dairy, the municipality also has corn and bean plantations.

== See also ==
- List of municipalities in Minas Gerais
