= São Tiago =

Town and municipality in the state of Minas Gerais, Brazil

Coordinates: 20°54′46″S 44°30′32″W

- Municipality
- Municipality of São Tiago
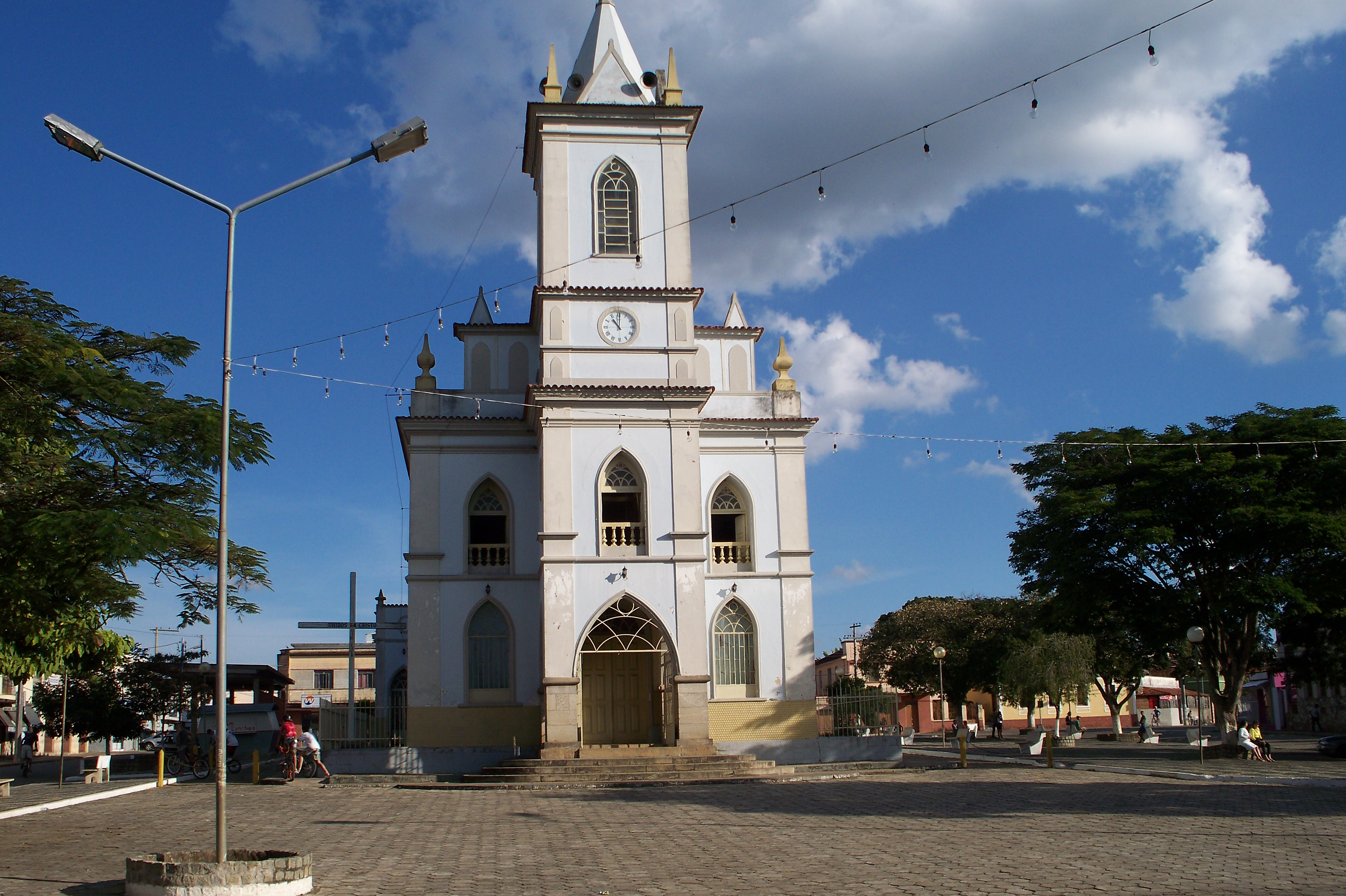
- Mother Church of São Tiago

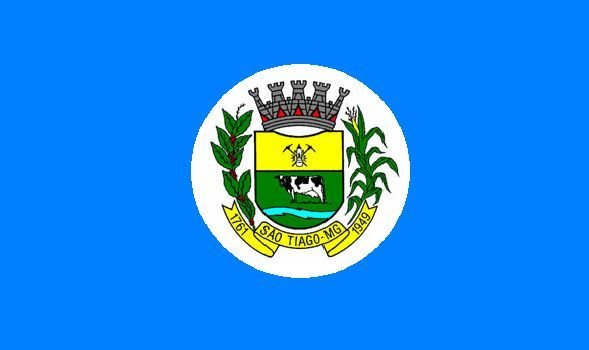
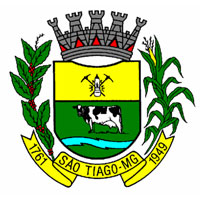
- Flag Coat of arms

- Location in Minas Gerais
- Country: Brazil
- State: Minas Gerais
- Region: Southeast
- Intermediate Region: Barbacena
- Immediate Region: São João del-Rei
- Founded: 1 January 1949

Government
  - Mayor: Alexandre Nonato Almeida Vivas (PATRI)

Area
  - Total: 572.400 km^{2} (221.005 sq mi)
- Elevation: 1,053 m (3,455 ft)

Population (2022 Census)
  - Total: 11,192
  - Estimate (2025): 11,559
  - Density: 19.553/km^{2} (50.641/sq mi)
- Demonym: são-tiaguense
- Time zone: UTC−3 (BRT)
- Postal Code: 36350-000 to 36359-999
- HDI (2010): 0.662 – medium
- Website: saotiago.mg.gov.br

São Tiago is a Brazilian municipality in the state of Minas Gerais. As of 2025 its population is estimated to be 11,559 .

== Geography ==
The municipality belongs to the Immediate Geographic Region of São João del-Rei, in the Intermediate Geographic Region of Barbacena.

The municipality is part of the Roman Catholic Diocese of Oliveira.

== See also ==
- List of municipalities in Minas Gerais
