= Tiradentes, Minas Gerais =

Tiradentes
- Municipality
- Municipality of Tiradentes
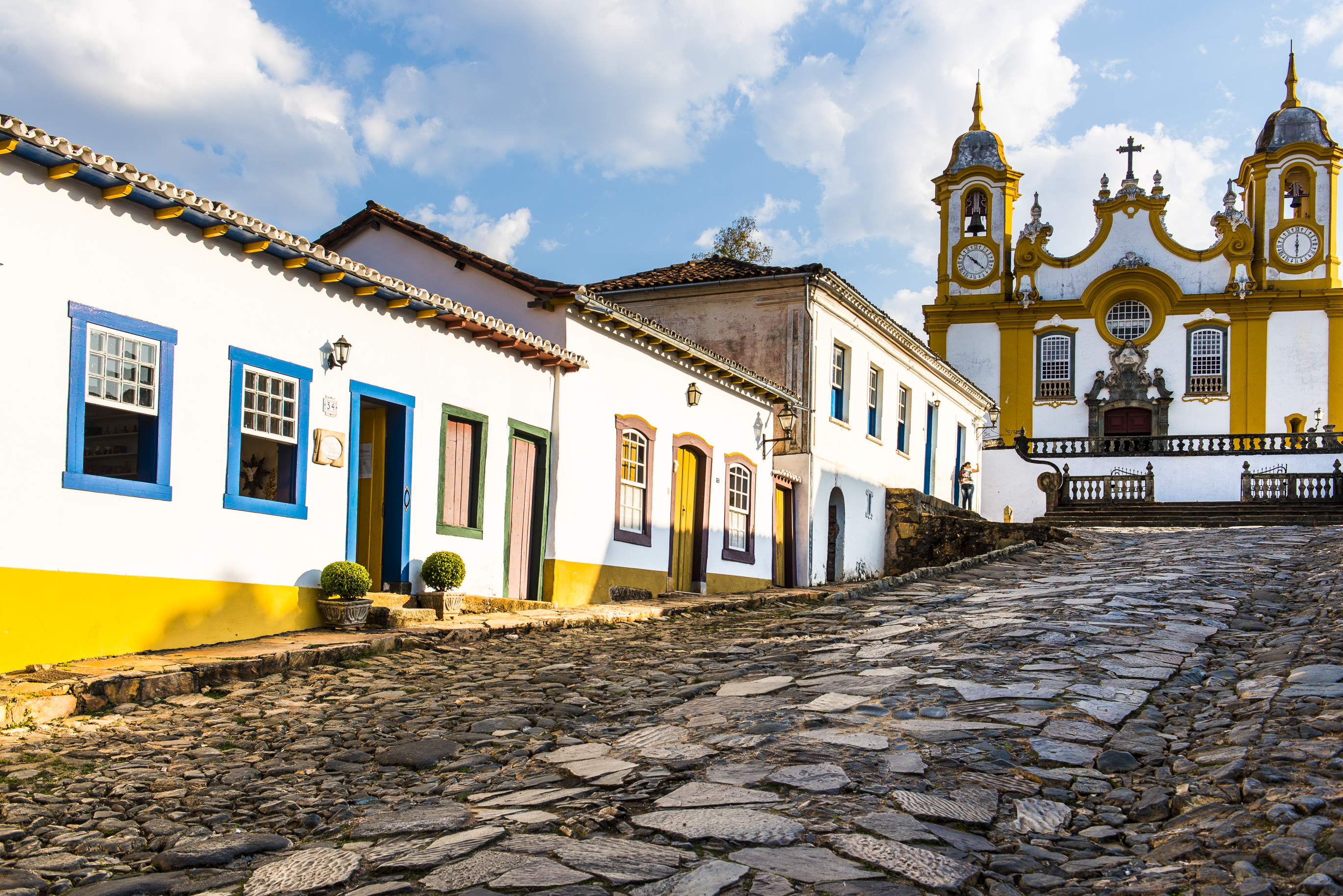
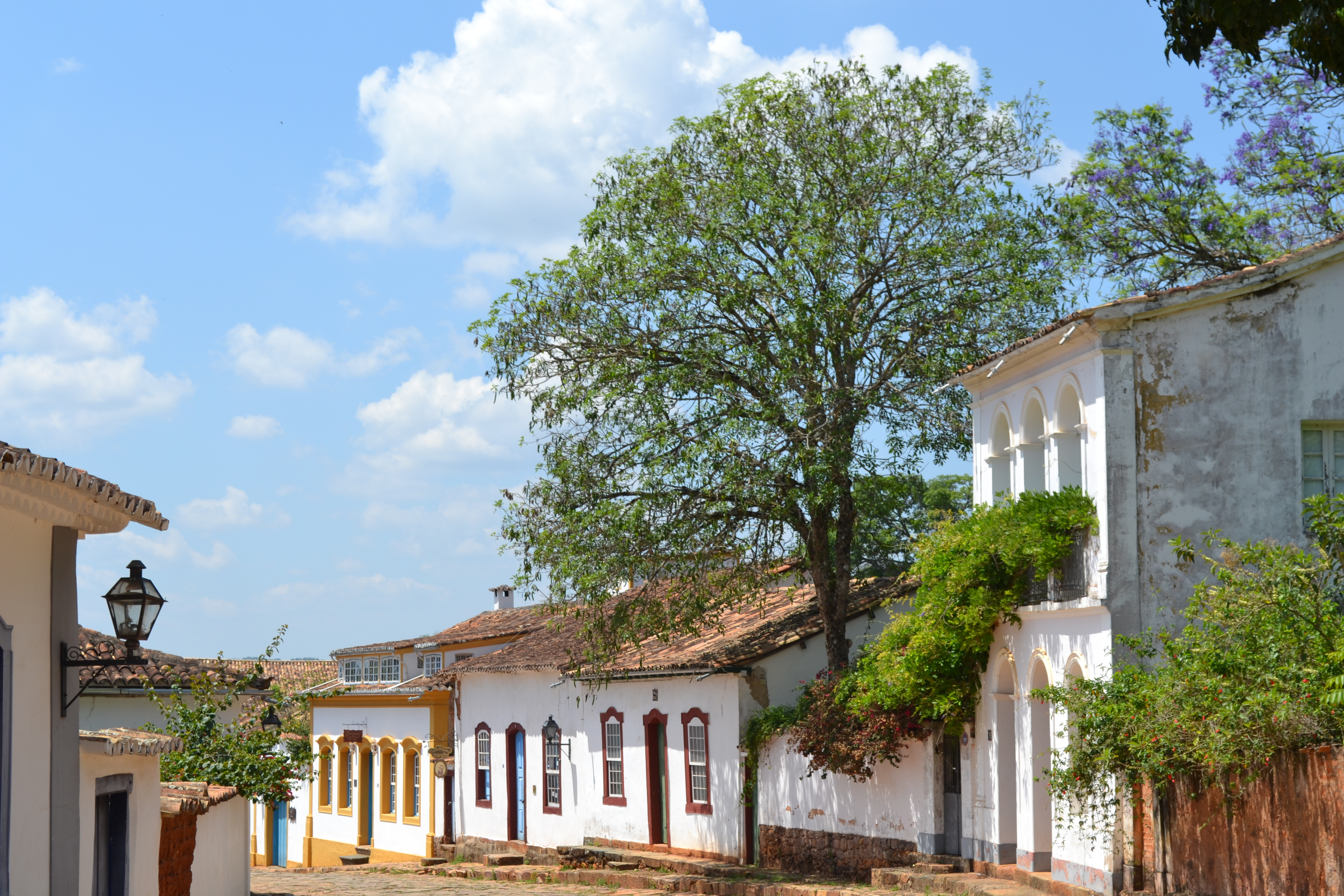
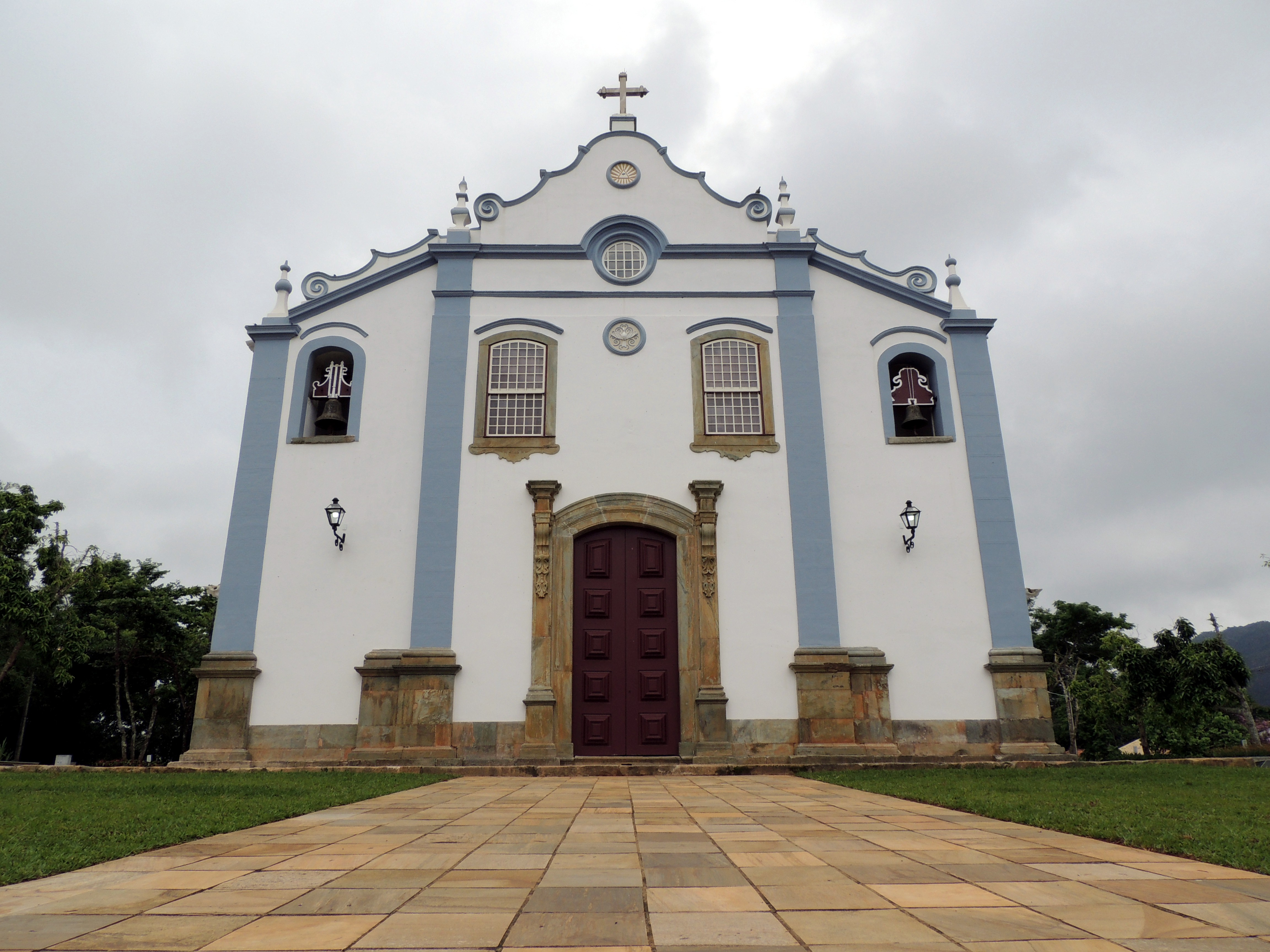
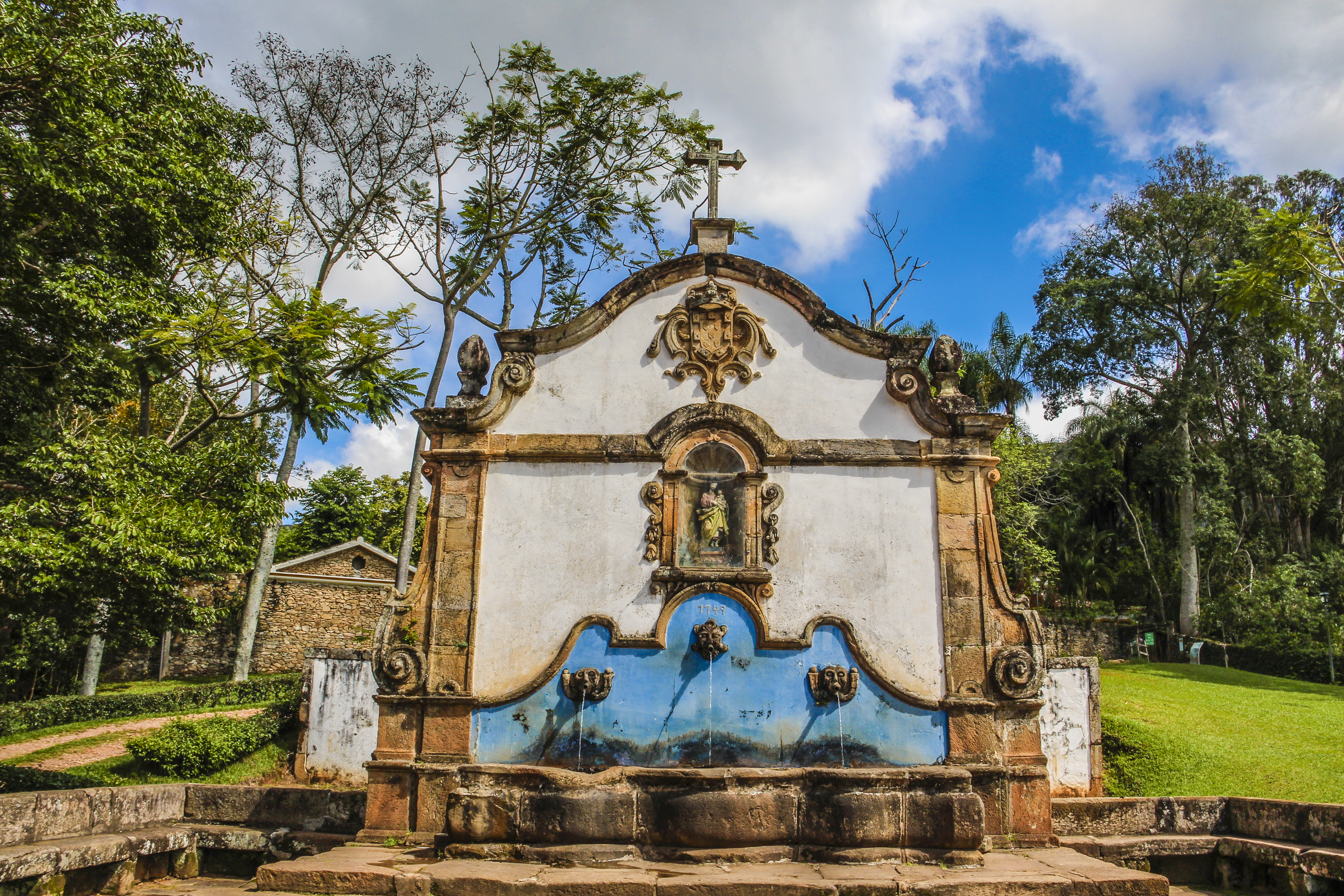
- Rue da Camara with St. Anthony Church Historic town center Sanctuary of the Holy Trinity St. Joseph fountain

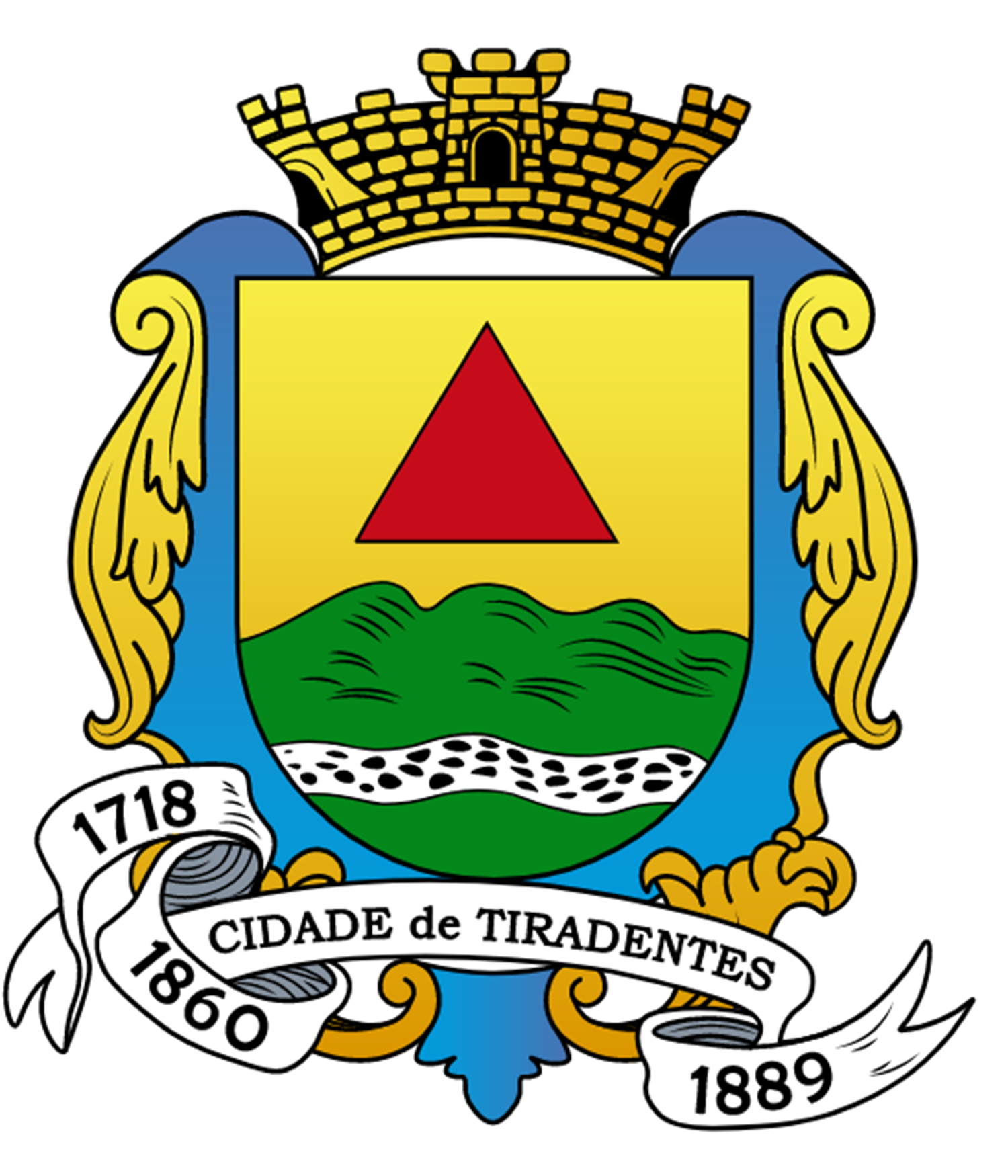
- Coat of arms

- Location in Minas Gerais
- Coordinates: 21°06′31″S 44°10′28″W
- Country: Brazil
- State: Minas Gerais
- Region: Southeast
- Intermediate Region: Barbacena
- Immediate Region: São João del-Rei
- Founded: 19 January 1718

Government
  - Mayor: Nilzio Barbosa (MDB)

Area
  - Total: 83.047 km^{2} (32.065 sq mi)
- Elevation: 903 m (2,963 ft)

Population (2022)
  - Total: 7,744
  - Estimate (2025): 8,056
  - Density: 93.25/km^{2} (241.5/sq mi)
- Time zone: UTC−3 (BRT)
- Postal Code: 36325-000 to 36327-999
- Area code: +55 32
- HDI (2010): 0.740 – high
- Website: tiradentes.mg.gov.br

Tiradentes is a municipality in the Brazilian state of Minas Gerais. It is located at 21°06′37″S 44°12′41″W, has an area of 83.5 km^{2} (32.2 sq mi), and a maximum elevation above sea level of 927 m. Tiradentes had an estimated population of 8,056 as of 2025. The original village was established in 1702 and became a city on 19 January 1718. In 1889 the city was renamed from Vila de São José do Rio das Mortes in honour of the national hero who was born nearby.

It has been acclaimed as an unspoiled example of Portuguese colonial architecture.

Other historical cities in Minas Gerais are Ouro Preto, São João del-Rei, Diamantina, Mariana, Congonhas and Sabará.

== Geography ==
According to the modern (2017) geographic classification by Brazil's National Institute of Geography and Statistics (IBGE), the municipality belongs to the Immediate Geographic Region of São João del-Rei, in the Intermediate Geographic Region of Barbacena.

=== Ecclesiastical circumscription ===
The municipality is part of the Roman Catholic Diocese of São João del-Rei.

== See also ==
- A section of the Estrada de Ferro Oeste de Minas narrow gauge railway from São João del-Rei to Tiradentes has been preserved as a tourist line.
