= Prados, Minas Gerais =

Coordinates: 21°03′S 44°05′W

Prados
- Municipality
- Municipality of Prados
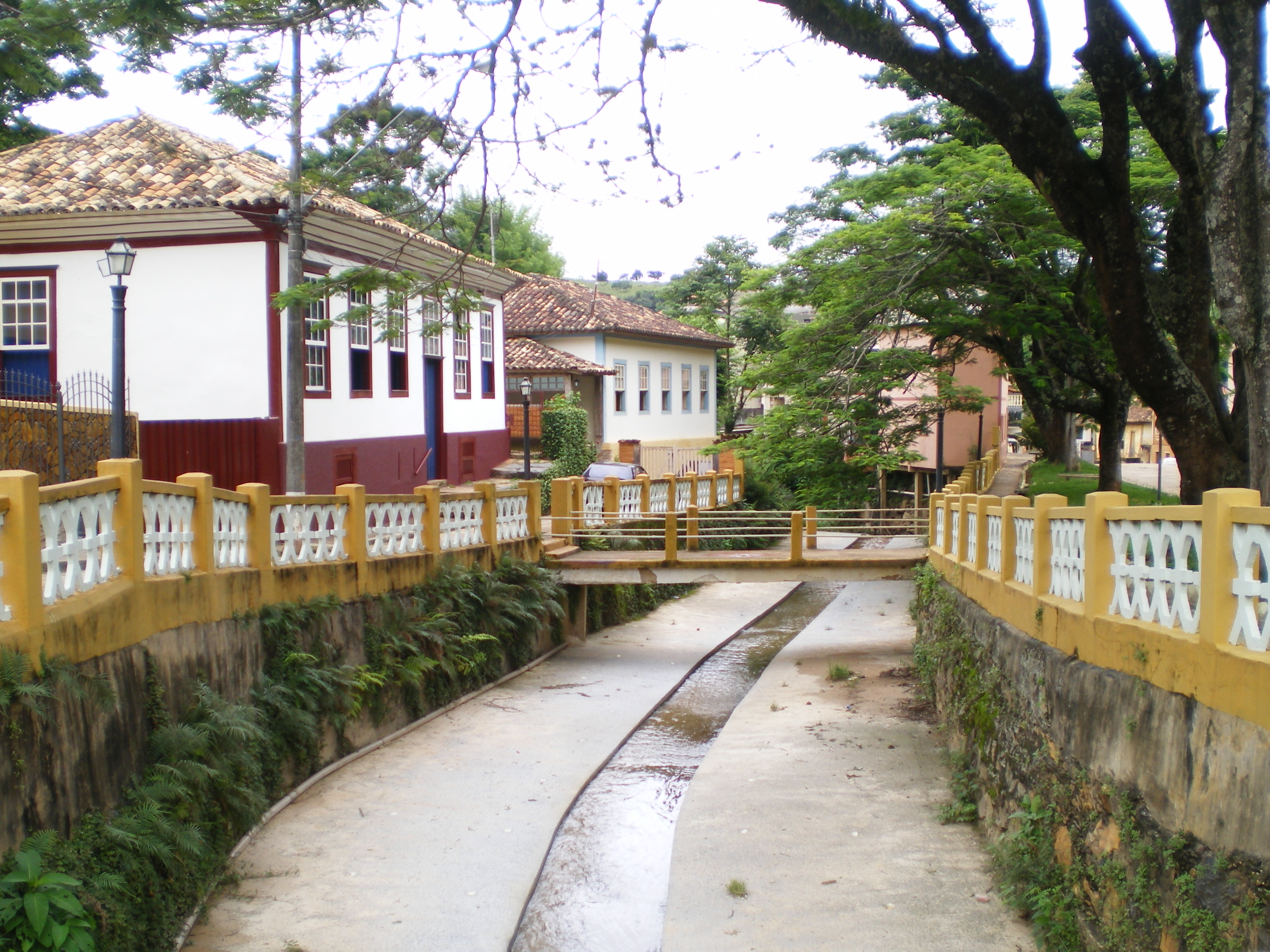

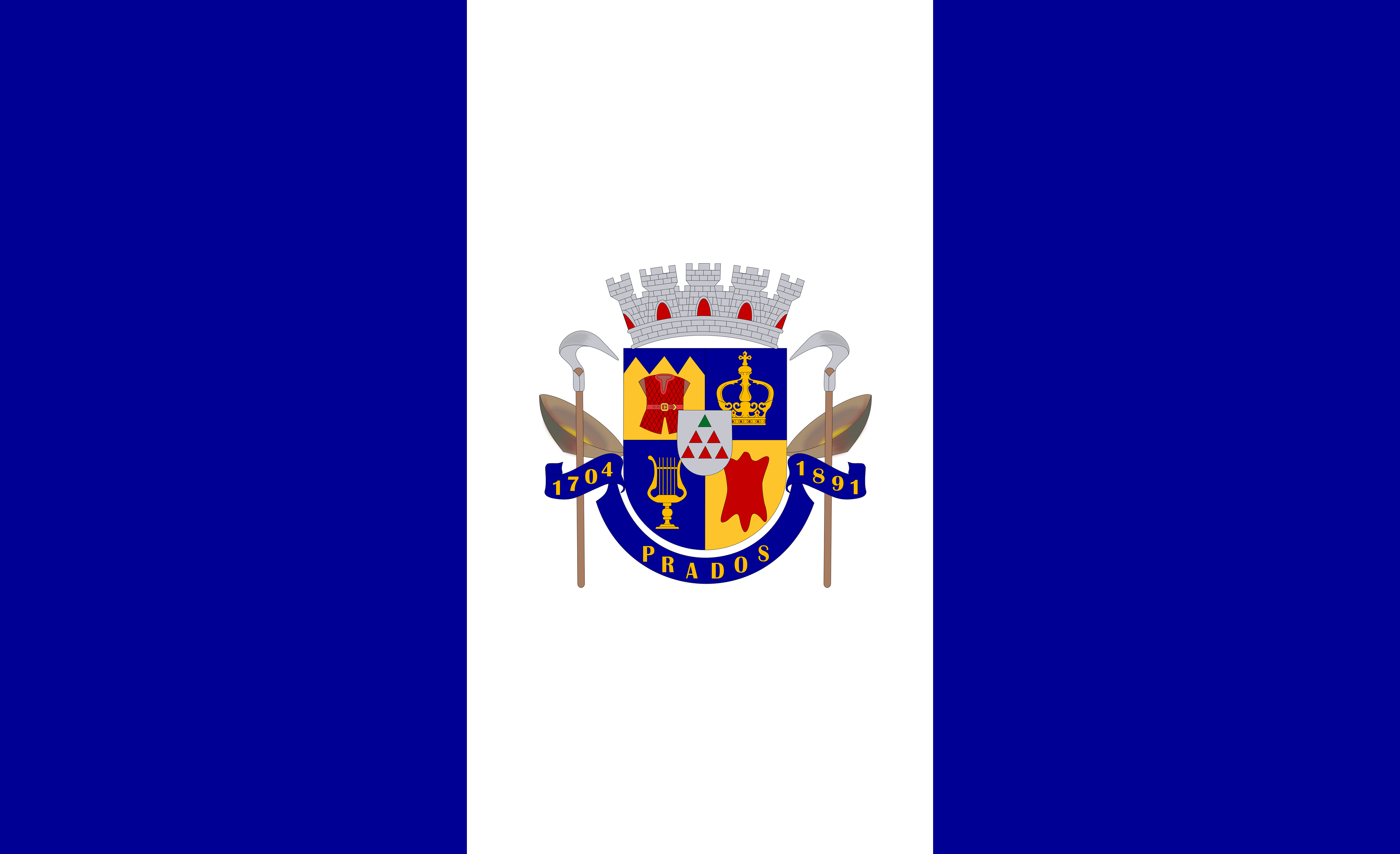
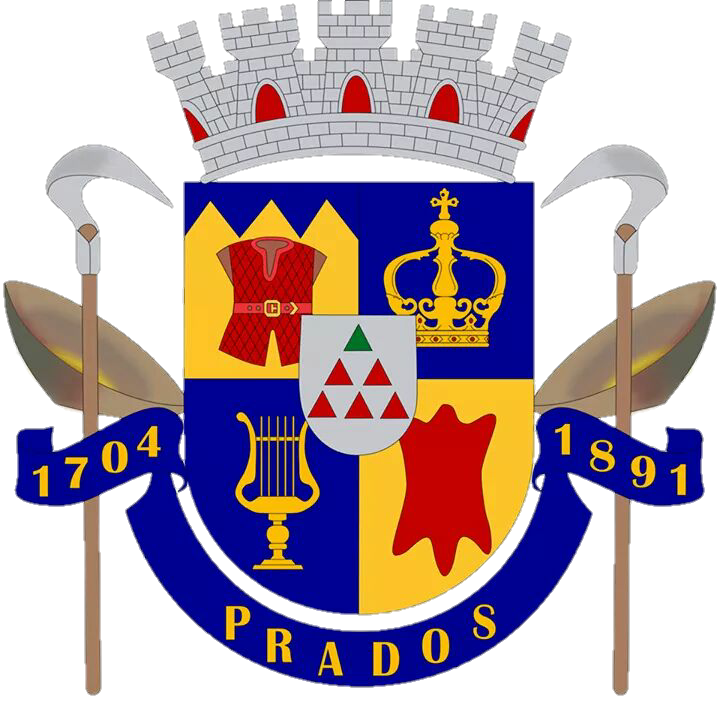
- Flag Coat of arms

- Location in the state of Minas Gerais
- Country: Brazil
- State: Minas Gerais
- Region: Southeast
- Intermediate Region: Barbacena
- Immediate Region: São João del-Rei
- Founded: 1704

Government
  - Mayor: Lester Rezende Dantas Júnior (PSDB)

Area
  - Total: 264.115 km^{2} (101.975 sq mi)

Population (2022 Census)
  - Total: 9,048
  - Estimate (2025): 9,369
  - Density: 34.26/km^{2} (88.73/sq mi)
- Demonym: pradense
- Time zone: UTC−3 (BRT)
- Postal Code: 36320-000 to 36324-999
- HDI (2010): 0.689 – medium
- Website: prados.mg.gov.br

Prados is a Brazilian municipality located in the state of Minas Gerais. The city belongs to the mesoregion of Campo das Vertentes and to the microregion of Sao Joao del Rei. In 2025, the estimated population was 9,369.

== Geography ==
According to the modern (2017) geographic classification by Brazil's National Institute of Geography and Statistics (IBGE), the municipality belongs to the Immediate Geographic Region of São João del-Rei, in the Intermediate Geographic Region of Barbacena.

=== Ecclesiastical circumscription ===
The municipality is part of the Roman Catholic Diocese of São João del-Rei.

== See also ==
- List of municipalities in Minas Gerais
