= Resende Costa =

Coordinates: 20°55′S 44°14′W

- Municipality
- Municipality of Resende Costa
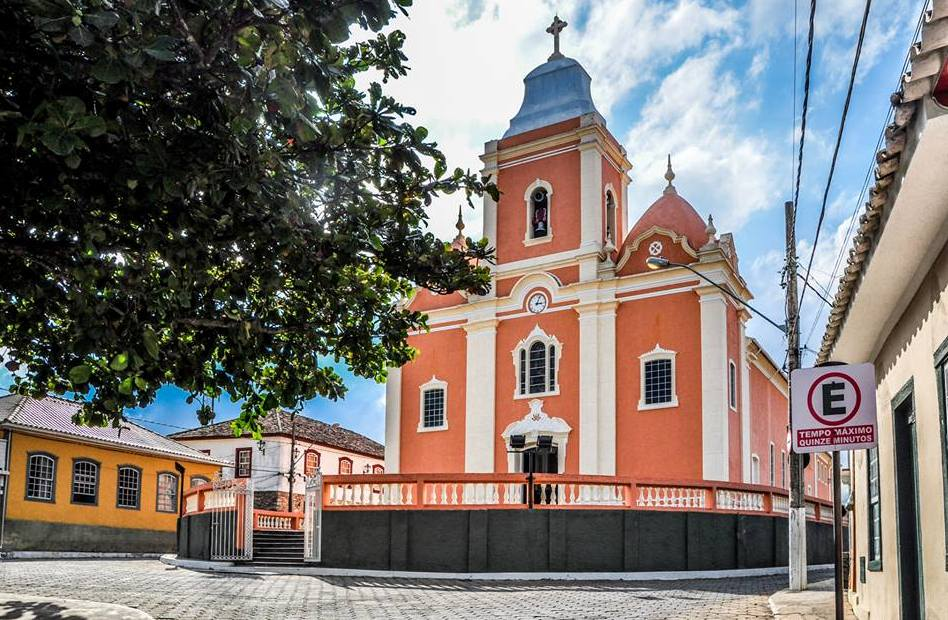
- Mother Church of Resende Costa

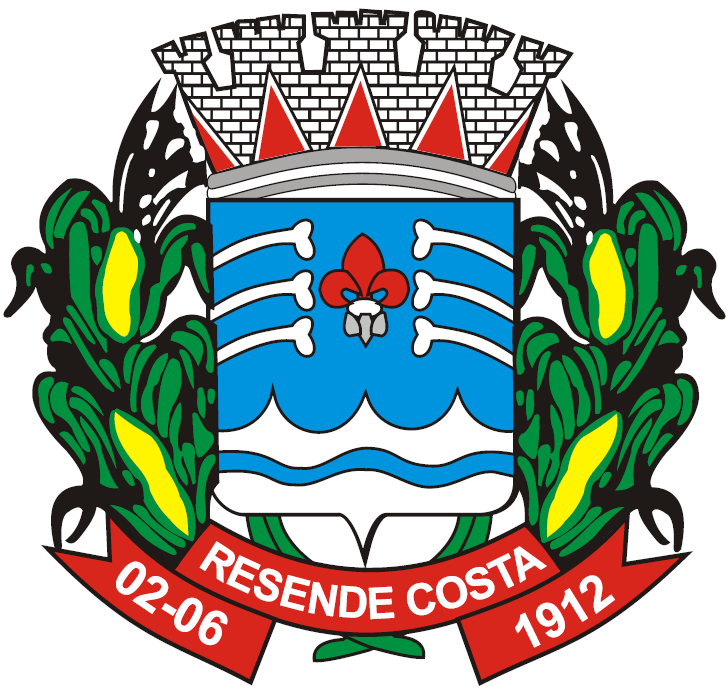
- Flag Coat of arms

- Location in Minas Gerais
- Country: Brazil
- State: Minas Gerais
- Region: Southeast
- Intermediate Region: Barbacena
- Immediate Region: São João del-Rei
- Founded: 2 June 1912

Government
  - Mayor: José Gouvea Filho (PSDB)

Area
  - Total: 618.312 km^{2} (238.732 sq mi)
- Elevation: 1,026 m (3,366 ft)

Population (2022 Census)
  - Total: 11,230
  - Estimate (2025): 11,544
  - Density: 18.16/km^{2} (47.04/sq mi)
- Demonym: resende-costense
- Time zone: UTC−3 (BRT)
- Postal Code: 36340-000 to 36344-999
- HDI (2010): 0.685 – medium
- Website: resendecosta.mg.gov.br

Resende Costa is a Brazilian municipality located in the state of Minas Gerais. The city belongs to the mesoregion of Campo das Vertentes and to the microregion of Sao Joao del Rei. In 2025, the estimated population was 11,544.

== Geography ==
According to IBGE (2017), the municipality belongs to the Immediate Geographic Region of São João del-Rei, in the Intermediate Geographic Region of Barbacena.

=== Ecclesiastical circumscription ===
The municipality is part of the Roman Catholic Diocese of São João del-Rei.

== See also ==
- List of municipalities in Minas Gerais
