= Nazareno, Minas Gerais =

Town and municipality in the state of Minas Gerais, Brazil

Nazareno
- Municipality
- Municipality of Nazareno
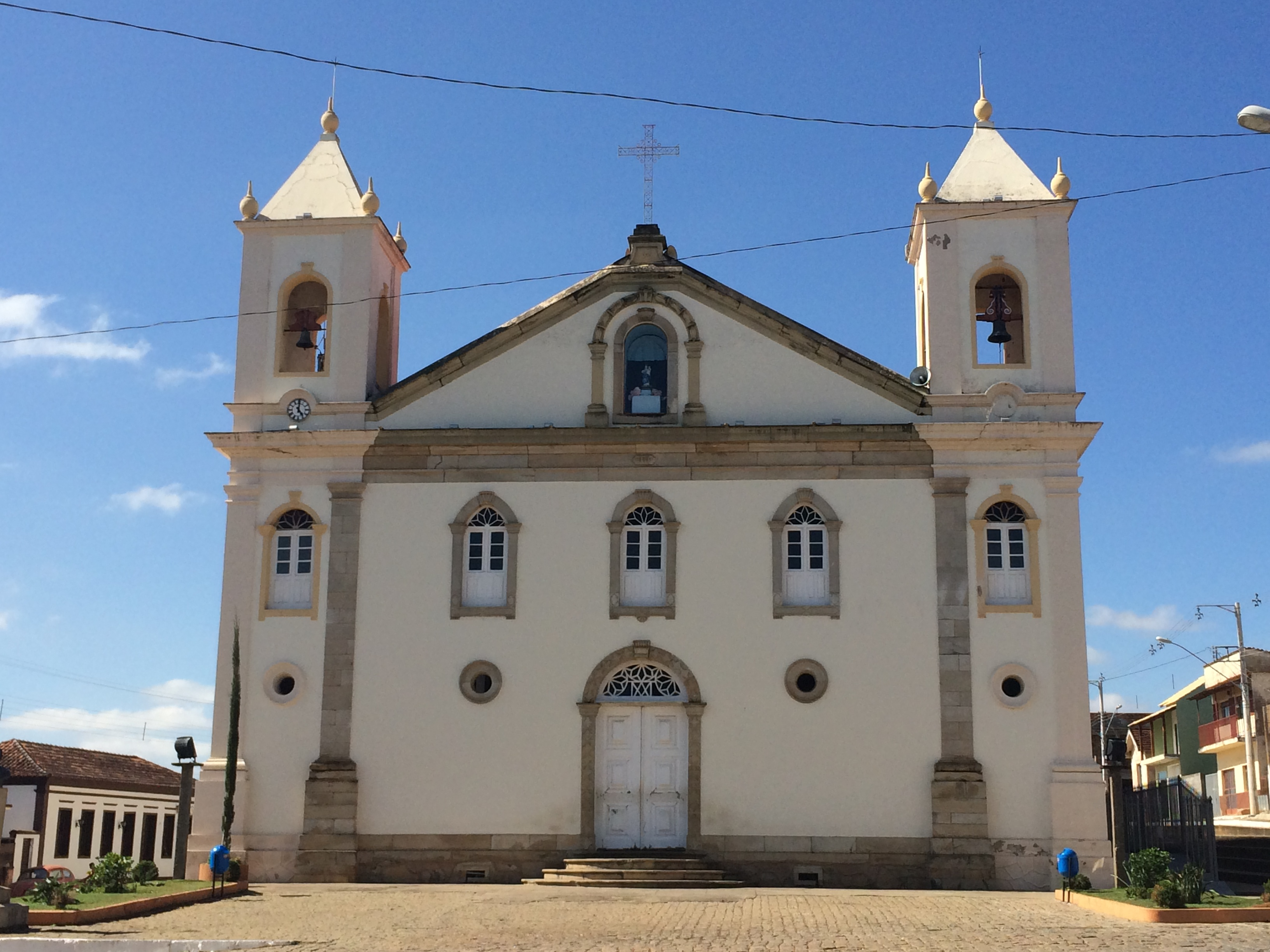

- Location in Minas Gerais
- Coordinates: 21.2158333433°S 44.6108333433°W
- Country: Brazil
- State: Minas Gerais
- Region: Southeast
- Intermediate Region: Barbacena
- Immediate Region: São João del-Rei
- Founded: 12 December 1953

Government
  - Mayor: José Heitor Guimarães de Carvalho (PSDB)

Area
  - Total: 341.453 km^{2} (131.836 sq mi)
- Elevation: 922 m (3,025 ft)

Population (2022 Census)
  - Total: 8,179
  - Estimate (2025): 8,407
  - Density: 23.95/km^{2} (62.04/sq mi)
- Demonym: nazarenense
- Time zone: UTC−3 (BRT)
- Postal Code: 36370-000 to 36389-999
- Area code: +55 32
- HDI (2010): 0.690 – medium
- Website: nazareno.mg.gov.br

Nazareno is a Brazilian municipality located in the state of Minas Gerais. In 2025, the estimated population was 8,407.

== Geography ==
According to IBGE (2017), the municipality belongs to the Immediate Geographic Region of São João del-Rei, in the Intermediate Geographic Region of Barbacena.

=== Ecclesiastical circumscription ===
The municipality is part of the Roman Catholic Diocese of São João del-Rei.

== See also ==
- List of municipalities in Minas Gerais
