= Coronel Xavier Chaves =

Coordinates: 21°01′26″S 44°13′22″W

- Municipality
- Municipality of Coronel Xavier Chaves
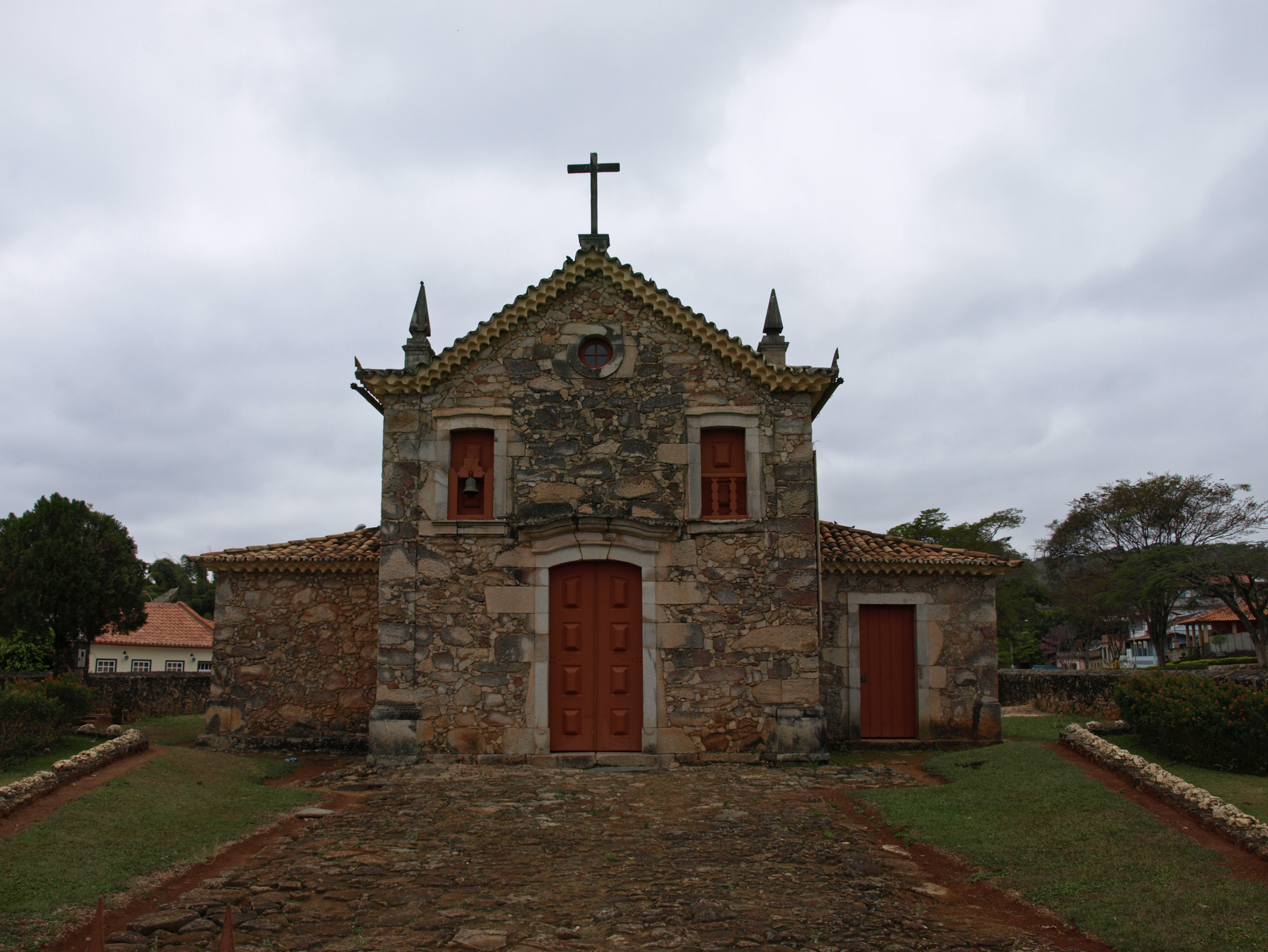
- Chapel of Nossa Senhora do Rosário, built in 1717

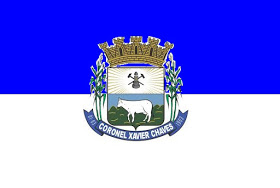
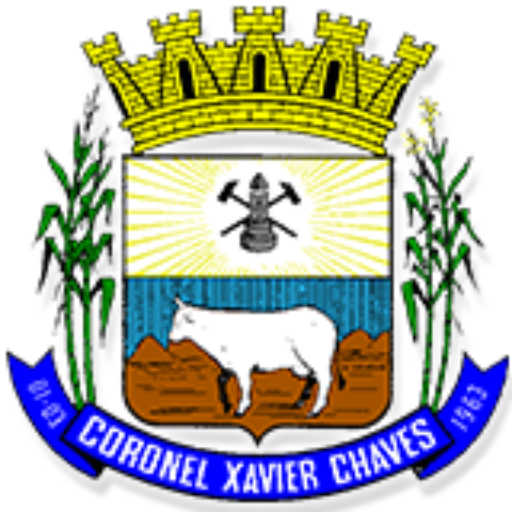
- Flag Coat of arms

- Country: Brazil
- Region: Southeast
- State: Minas Gerais
- Founded: 30 December 1962

Government
  - Mayor: Fúvio Olímpio de Oliveira Pinto (PSDB)

Area
  - Total: 140.954 km^{2} (54.423 sq mi)
- Elevation: 972 m (3,189 ft)

Population (2022 Census)
  - Total: 3,486
  - Estimate (2025): 3,599
  - Density: 23.42/km^{2} (60.7/sq mi)
- Demonym: xavierense
- Time zone: UTC−3 (BRT)
- Postal Code: 36330-000 to 36334-999
- HDI (2010): 0.677 – medium
- Website: coronelxavierchaves.mg.gov.br/prefeitura/

Coronel Xavier Chaves is a Brazilian municipality located in the state of Minas Gerais. The city belongs to the mesoregion of Campo das Vertentes and to the microregion of São João del-Rei. In 2025, the estimated population was 3,599.

The municipality contains part of the Ritápolis National Forest.

== Geography ==
According to IBGE (2017), the municipality belongs to the Immediate Geographic Region of São João del-Rei, in the Intermediate Geographic Region of Barbacena.

=== Ecclesiastical circumscription ===
The municipality is part of the Roman Catholic Diocese of São João del-Rei.

== See also ==
- List of municipalities in Minas Gerais
