= Santa Cruz de Minas =

- Municipality
- Municipality of Santa Cruz de Minas
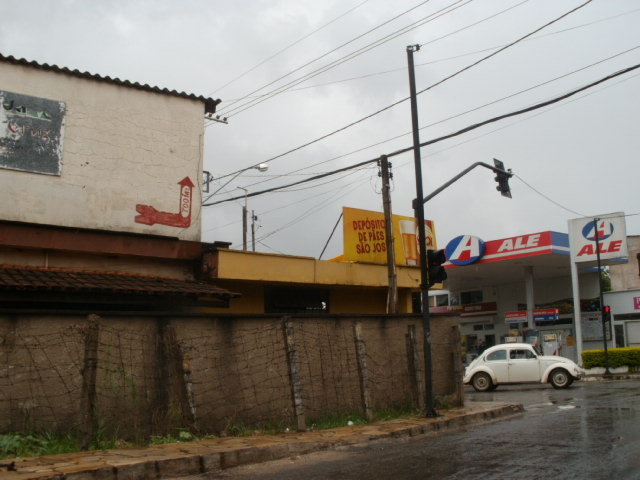
- A view of a street of Santa Cruz de Minas

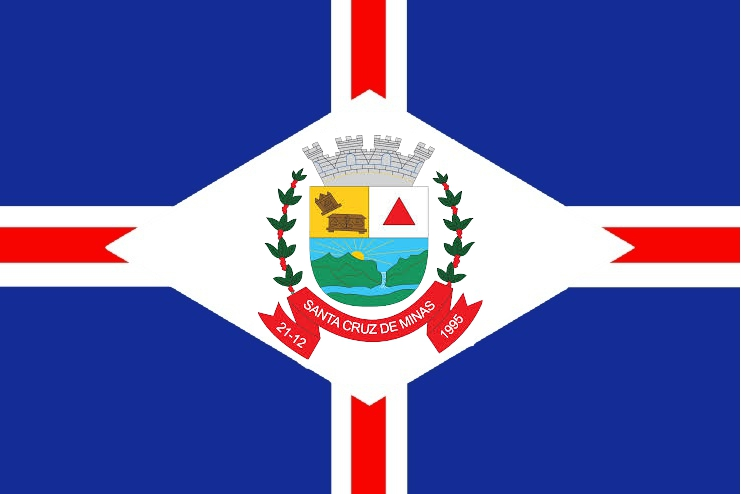
- Flag
- Nickname: "A Menorzinha do Brasil, Santa Cruz" ("Brazil's Littlest, Santa Cruz")
- Location of Santa Cruz de Minas in Minas Gerais and Brazil
- Coordinates: 21°07′12″S 44°13′22″W
- Country: Brazil
- Region: Southeast
- State: Minas Gerais
- Founded: 21 December 1995

Government
  - Mayor: Wagner de Almeida (PRD) (2025-2028)

Area
  - Total: 2.859 km^{2} (1.104 sq mi)
- Elevation: 930 m (3,050 ft)

Population (2022 Census)
  - Total: 8,109
  - Estimate (2025): 8,339
  - Density: 2,752.71/km^{2} (7,129.5/sq mi)
- Demonym: santacruzense
- Time zone: UTC−3 (BRT)
- Area code: 38
- HDI' (2000): 0.755 – medium

Santa Cruz de Minas is a Brazilian municipality located in the state of Minas Gerais. The city belongs to the mesoregion of Campo das Vertentes and to the microregion of Sao Joao del Rei. It is the smallest municipality of Brazil, measuring only 2.9 square kilometres (1.1 sq mi).

== Geography ==
According to IBGE (2017), the municipality belongs to the Immediate Geographic Region of São João del-Rei, in the Intermediate Geographic Region of Barbacena.

=== Ecclesiastical circumscription ===
The municipality is part of the Roman Catholic Diocese of São João del-Rei.

== See also ==
- List of municipalities in Minas Gerais
