= Lagoa Dourada =

Coordinates: 20°55′S 44°05′W

- Municipality
- Municipality of Lagoa Dourada
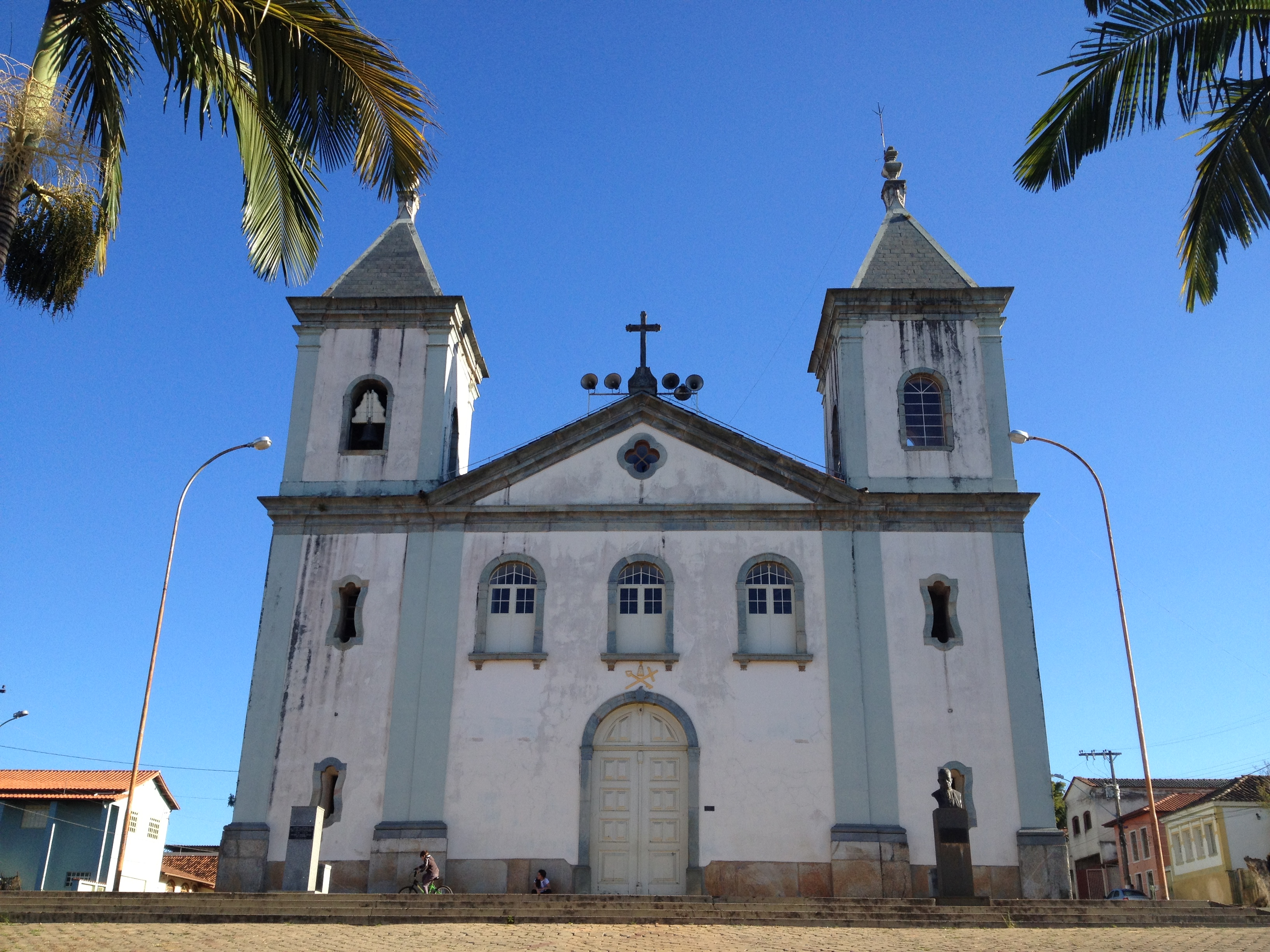

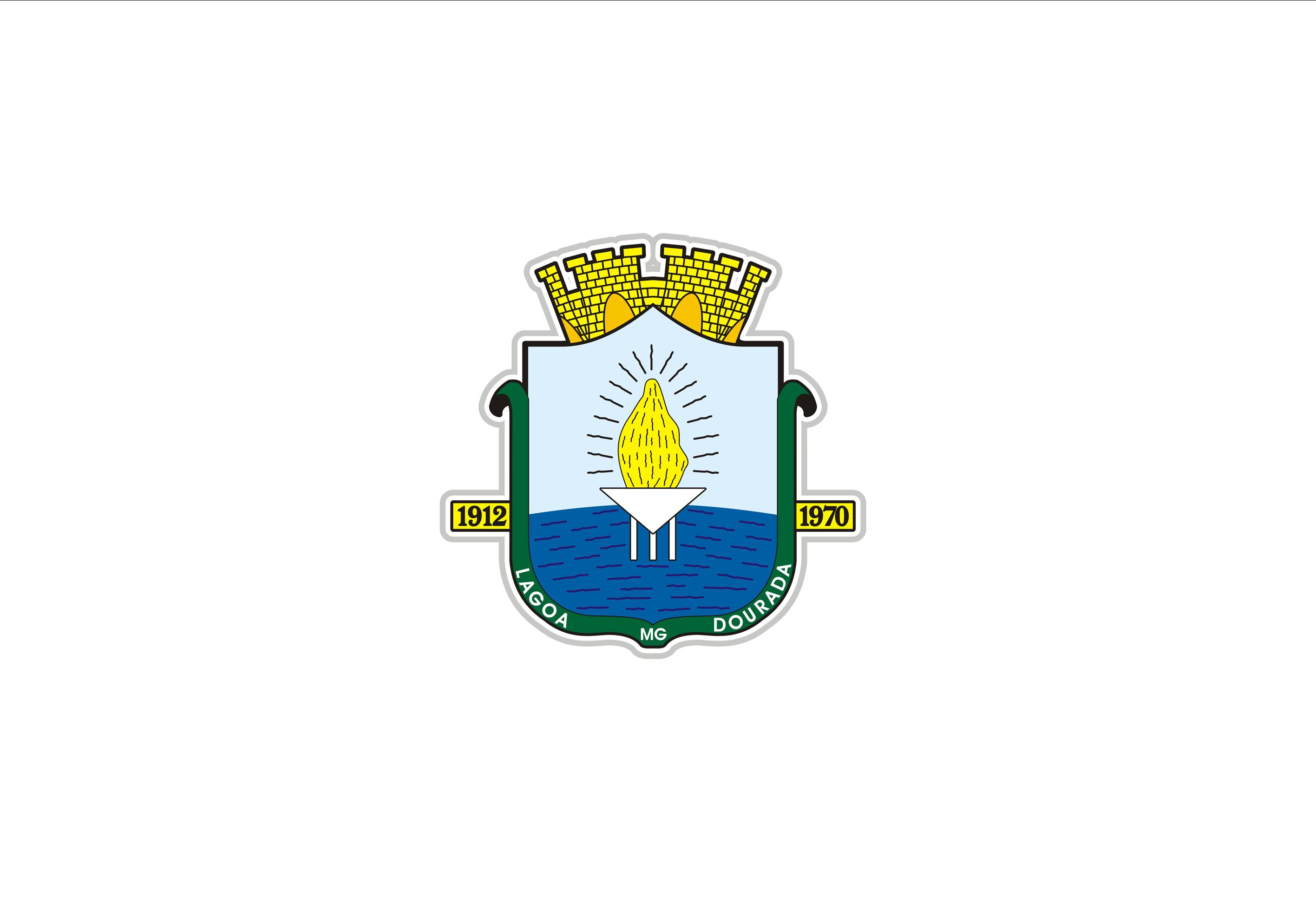
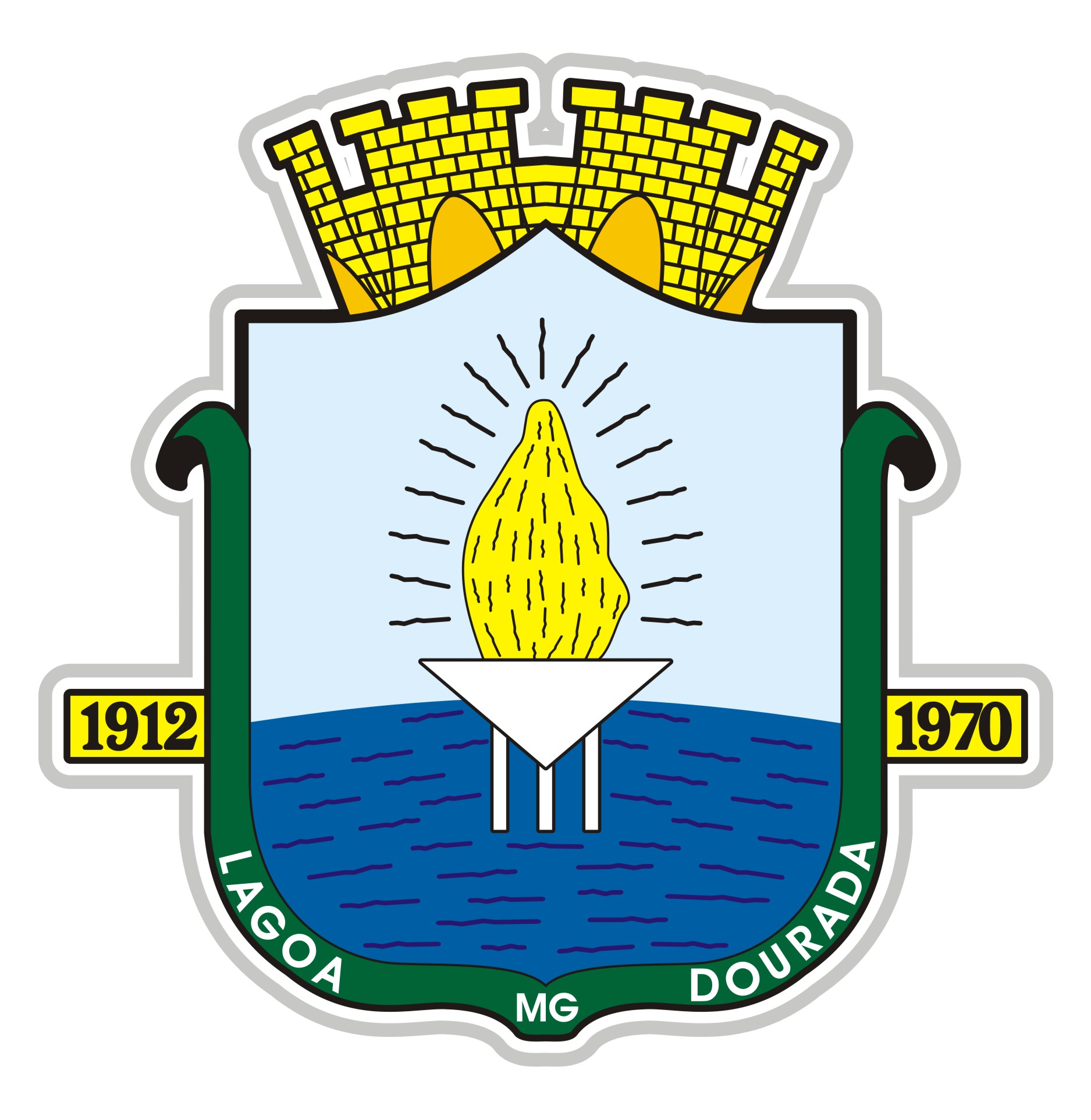
- Flag Coat of arms

- Location in Minas Gerais
- Country: Brazil
- State: Minas Gerais
- Region: Southeast
- Intermediate Region: Barbacena
- Immediate Region: São João del-Rei
- Founded: 6 June 1912

Government
  - Mayor: Ronald Pereira Dutra (PSDB)

Area
  - Total: 476.693 km^{2} (184.052 sq mi)
- Elevation: 1,080 m (3,540 ft)

Population (2022 Census)
  - Total: 12,769
  - Estimate (2025): 13,152
  - Density: 26.787/km^{2} (69.377/sq mi)
- Demonym: lagoense
- Time zone: UTC−3 (BRT)
- Postal Code: 36345-000 to 36349-999
- HDI (2010): 0.676 – medium
- Website: lagoadourada.mg.gov.br

Lagoa Dourada is a Brazilian municipality located in the state of Minas Gerais.

It is the national capital of the Swiss roll, locally called rocambole.

== Geography ==
According to IBGE (2017), the municipality belongs to the Immediate Geographic Region of São João del-Rei, in the Intermediate Geographic Region of Barbacena.

=== Ecclesiastical circumscription ===
The municipality is part of the Roman Catholic Diocese of São João del-Rei.

== Demography ==
=== Population ===
In 2020, the estimated population was 13,063.

== See also ==
- List of municipalities in Minas Gerais
