= Francisco Paulo de Almeida, Baron of Guaraciaba =

Brazilian landowner and banker

Francisco Paulo de Almeida
- Baron of Guaraciaba
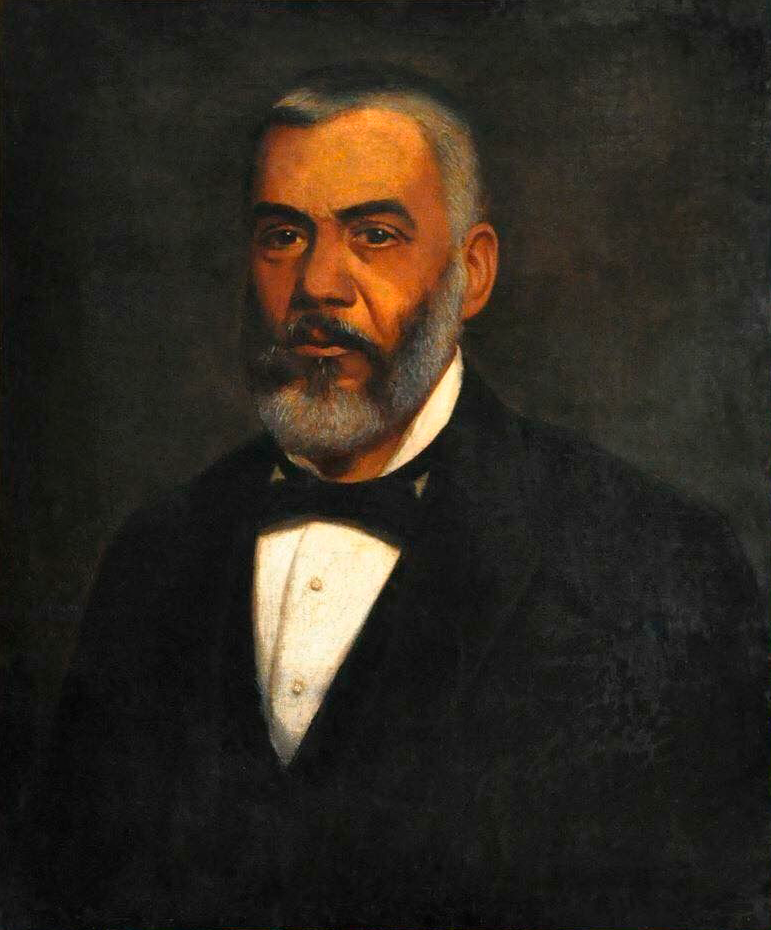
- Portrait of Almeida
- Born: 10 January 1826; Lagoa Dourada, Minas Gerais, Empire of Brazil
- Died: 9 February 1901 (aged 75); Rio de Janeiro, Rio de Janeiro, Brazil
- Spouse: Brasília de Almeida
- Occupation: Landowner; banker

Francisco Paulo de Almeida, first and only Baron of Guaraciaba (10 January 1826 – 9 February 1901), was a Brazilian landowner and banker. He distinguished himself for being one of the most financially successful black men in the Empire of Brazil. He owned several plantations and about two hundred slaves in just one of them (estimated at a thousand slaves in all), with a fortune estimated at the time at seven hundred thousand contos de réis. He was the owner of the Yellow Palace in the city of Petrópolis.

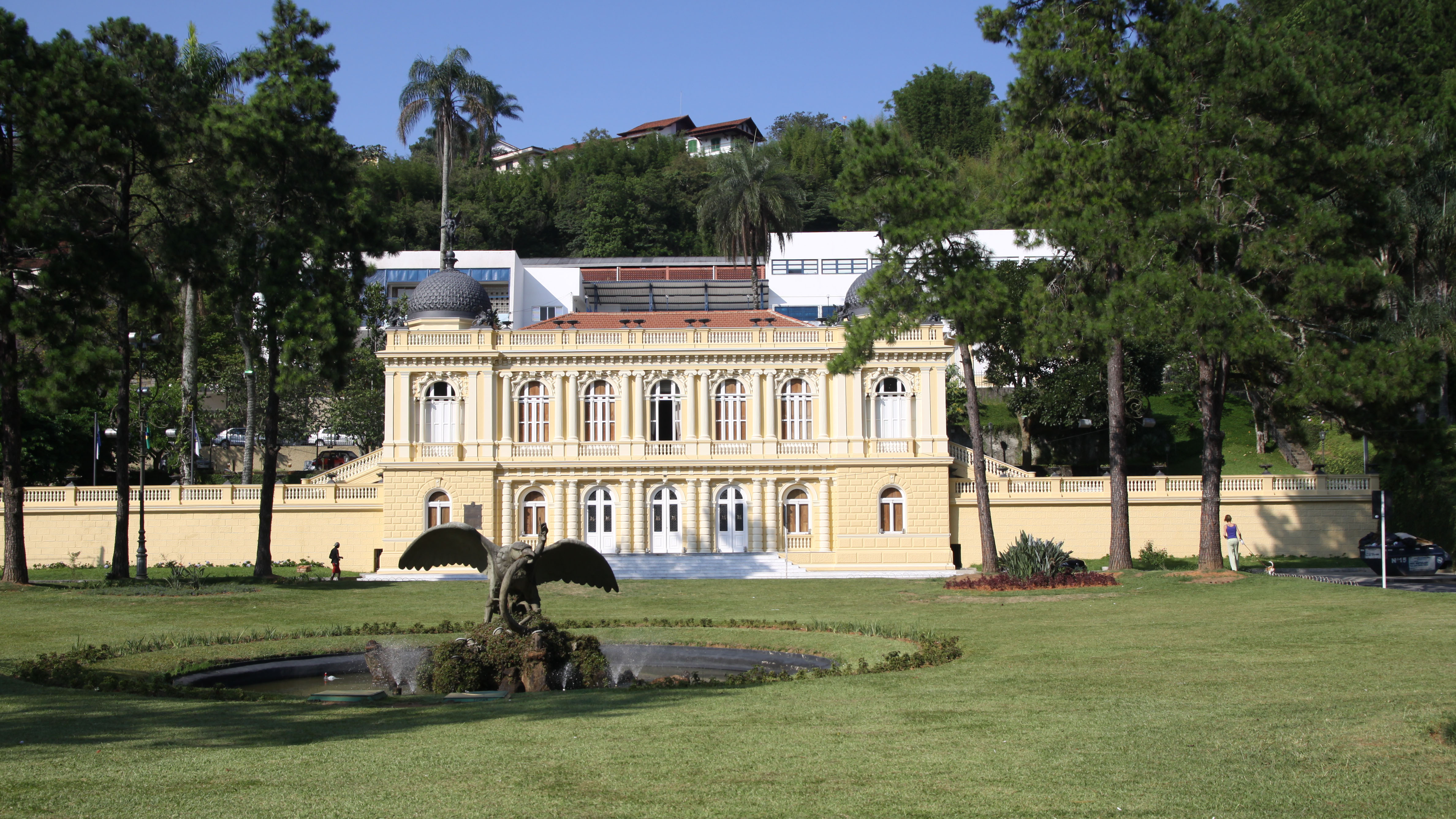
The Yellow Palace in Petrópolis.

== Biography ==
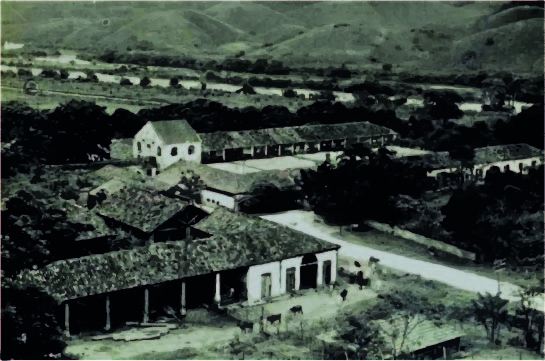
The Fazenda do Pocinho, one of Almeida's coffee farms

Almeida was the son of António José de Almeida and his first wife, Galdina Alberta do Espírito Santo. He was married to Brasília de Almeida (1844–1889).

He began his life as a goldsmith, specializing in the manufacture of collar buttons. He was an accomplished violinist and supplemented his income by playing at funerals. Later on he became a tropeiro and in 1860 he bought his first farm in Arraial de São Sebastião do Rio Bonito.

Almeida concentrated his coffee business in Minas Gerais and Rio de Janeiro (in the Paraíba Valley). He owned several coffee farms, including Fazenda Veneza, in Conservatória (today part of Valença), later owned by Lily Marinho, and Fazenda do Pocinho (which was owned by the Almeida e Souza family) located between the towns of Barra do Piraí and Vassouras.

Historian Carlos Alberto Dias Ferreira, author of the book Barão de Guaraciaba, Francisco Paulo de Almeida: um negro no Brasil Império-Escravagista, states about the baron:

"It is not a contradiction that he was black and a slave owner, as he was aware of the period in which he lived and needed labour to run his farms. And the available labour was the slave one."

He was a founding partner of the Banco Territorial de Minas Gerais and the Banco de Crédito Real de Minas Gerais.

Being awarded the noble title of baron in 1887 by princess Isabel, he was the first black baron of the empire, notable for his beneficence in favor of the Santas Casas.

After the proclamation of the Republic, he acquired the Yellow Palace, the current seat of the legislature of the city of Petrópolis, and was harassed by the legislature, until he sold his property.

== Descendants ==
His children were:

- Mathilde de Almeida (and Souza).
- Adelaide de Almeida.
- Cristina de Almeida.
- Adelina de Almeida.
- Seberlina de Almeida.
- Paulo de Almeida.
- Artur de Almeida.
- Mário de Almeida.
- Francisco de Almeida.
- Raul de Almeida.
- Paulo de Almeida Guaraciaba

His sons were sent to France to study, with his death they returned to Brazil and some adopted Guaraciaba as a surname.
