= Boston Metal =

US company developing steel technology

- Industry: steel industry technology
- Founded: 2013
- Headquarters: Woburn, Massachusetts
- Key people: Tadeu Carneiro, Chairman & CEO
- Website: www.bostonmetal.com

Boston Metal is a company developing a technology known as molten oxide electrolysis (MOE) to decarbonize steelmaking and recover high-value metals from mining waste. The company is based in Woburn, Massachusetts, with its Brazilian subsidiary, Boston Metal do Brasil, based in Coronel Xavier Chaves, Minas Gerais.

== History ==
Boston Metal's core technology was developed by researchers at Massachusetts Institute of Technology after professor Donald Sadoway demonstrated the use of electrical currents to break down metal oxides in an electrolytic cell to produce molten metal and oxygen gas. Laboratory tests revealed that Sadoway's anode material could produce steel. The team published a paper in Nature in 2013. Boston Metal was founded that year.

Tadeu Carneiro joined the company as CEO in 2017 adding more than 40 years of experience and leadership in the metals industry. He was named a Boston Globe Tech Power Player in 2023.

In 2022, Boston Metal completed the first test of its semi-industrial 25,000-amp (MOE) cell, a key step in commercializing the technology.

The company launched its Brazilian subsidiary focused on high-value metals production in 2022 and began construction in Brazil in Coronel Xavier Chaves.

Boston Metal currently has more than 200 employees. In 2024, the company was selected for the TIME100 Most Influential Companies list, and its green steel solution, MOE, was recognized as one of Fast Company’s World Changing Ideas. Boston Metal was named North American Company of the Year by the Cleantech Group in 2023, a 2023 Norrsken Impact/100 nominee, received the S&P Platts Global Metal Award in 2021, a Bloomberg New Energy Finance Technology Pioneer in 2020, and is currently on the Global Cleantech 100 list by the Cleantech Group. The United States Department of Energy (DOE) announced in November 2023 that it would provide the company with funding to support the building of a new facility in Weirton, West Virginia. The plant will manufacture critical materials needed for clean power, fuel cells, and green steel supply chains.

Boston Metal had raised over $370M as of January 2024. Total funding raised as of July 2025 was $420M.

The company announced it would be laying off 71 workers and closing its operations in Woburn, Massachusetts in March 2026, and focusing on commercialization activities of their Brazilian subsidiary which recovers high value metals from mine tailings. The decision was triggered by an equipment failure at their Brazilian plant which resulted in a missed key milestone for securing additional financing which would have allowed the Woburn operations to continue.

== Technology ==
Boston Metal's MOE technology offers an approach to steelmaking that does not involve direct carbon emissions. For a century electrolysis has been the primary method of producing aluminum. Boston Metal is applying a variant of the technique to iron. In the MOE cell, an inert anode is immersed in an electrolyte containing iron ore. An electric current is applied to the electrolyte. When the cell reaches 1600C, the iron is reduced, yielding liquid iron. The MOE platform differs from traditional steelmaking in that it can be powered by renewable electricity and eliminates many steps in the production process, including the use of coal/coke.

The technology can also be applied to extract valuable metals from low-concentration materials conventionally considered waste, reducing financial and environmental impacts.
