= Ritápolis National Forest =

National forest in Brazil

- IUCN category VI (protected area with sustainable use of natural resources)
- Location within Brazil
- Nearest city: Ritápolis, Minas Gerais
- Coordinates: 21°03′14″S 44°16′41″W
- Designation: National forest
- Administrator: Chico Mendes Institute for Biodiversity Conservation

Ritápolis National Forest (Portuguese: Floresta Nacional de Ritápolis) is a national forest in the state of Minas Gerais, Brazil.

== Location ==
The Ritápolis National Forest covers 89.19 hectares (220.4 acres) of Atlantic Forest. It covers parts of the municipalities of São João del Rei, Ritápolis and Coronel Xavier Chaves in Minas Gerais.

== Conservation ==
The Ritápolis National Forest was created on 21 September 1999 and is administered by the Chico Mendes Institute for Biodiversity Conservation (ICMBio). It is classed as IUCN protected area category VI (protected area with sustainable use of natural resources), with the goal of supporting sustainable multiple use of forest resources and scientific research, with emphasis on methods for sustainable exploitation of native forests.

== Sources ==
- Flona de Ritápolis (in Portuguese), Chico Mendes Institute for Biodiversity Conservation
- Unidade de Conservação: Floresta Nacional de Ritápolis (in Portuguese), MMA: Ministério do Meio Ambiente
