= Immediate Geographic Region of São João del-Rei =

Urban administrative region in Minas Gerais, Brazil

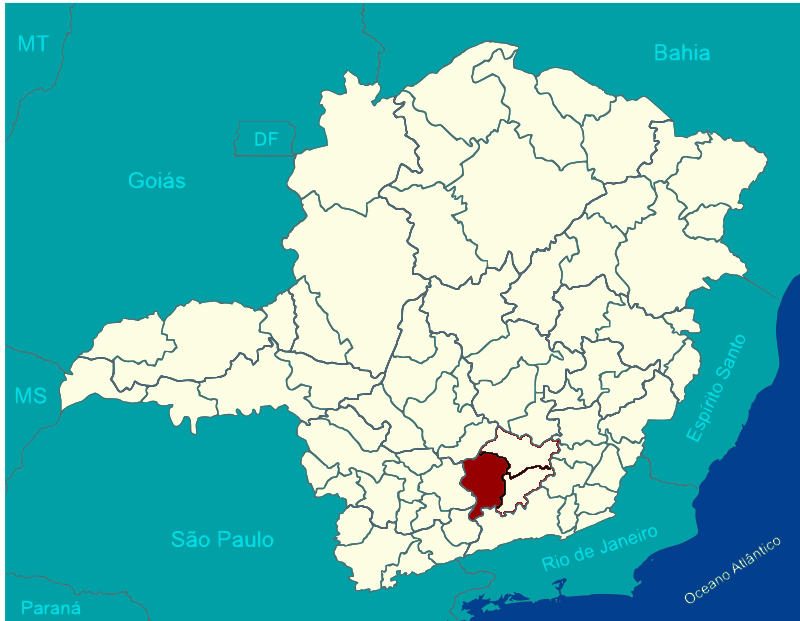
The Immediate Geographic Region of São João del-Rei, in the state of Minas Gerais, Brazil.

The Immediate Geographic Region of São João del-Rei is one of the 10 immediate geographic regions in the Intermediate Geographic Region of Barbacena, one of the 70 immediate geographic regions in the Brazilian state of Minas Gerais and one of the 509 of Brazil, created by the National Institute of Geography and Statistics (IBGE) in 2017.

== Municipalities ==
It comprises 14 municipalities:

- Conceição da Barra de Minas
- Coronel Xavier Chaves
- Lagoa Dourada
- Madre de Deus de Minas
- Nazareno
- Piedade do Rio Grande
- Prados
- Resende Costa
- Ritápolis
- Santa Cruz de Minas
- São João del-Rei
- São Tiago
- São Vicente de Minas
- Tiradentes

== Statistics ==
Population: 188 356 (July 1, 2017 estimation).

Area: 5 838,734 km^{2}.

Population density: 32,3/km^{2}.

== Trivia ==
The region was a major gold producing zone in the 1700s.

=== Ecclesiastical circunscription ===
Of the 14 municipalities, 13 municipalities are part of the Roman Catholic Diocese of São João del-Rei, in the ecclesiastical province of Juiz de Fora.

Only São Tiago is part of a different diocese: the Roman Catholic Diocese of Oliveira, in the ecclesiastical province of Belo Horizonte.
