= Municipalities of Brazil =

State administrative areas in Brazil

Municipalities of Brazil municípios do Brasil (Portuguese)
- Municipalities of Brazil as of January 2023
- Category: Municipio / Municipality
- Location: Brazil
- Found in: Brazilian states
- Number: 5,571 (as of October 2023)
- Populations: Smallest: 857 (Serra da Saudade, MG); Largest: 11,911,337 (São Paulo, SP)
- Areas: Smallest: 3 km^{2} (1.2 sq mi) (Santa Cruz de Minas, MG); Largest: 159,533.7 km^{2} (61,596.3 sq mi) (Altamira, PA)
- Government: Prefeitura Municipal (en: Municipal Government)
- Subdivisions: Districts of Brazil

The municipalities of Brazil (Portuguese: municípios do Brasil), also known as the counties of Brazil, are the administrative divisions of the Brazilian states. Brazil currently has 5,570 municipalities, which, given the 2026 population estimate of 214,211,951, makes an average municipality population of 37,728 inhabitants. The average state in Brazil has 214 municipalities. Roraima is the least subdivided state, with 15 municipalities, while Minas Gerais is the most, with 853. Northern states are divided into small numbers of large municipalities (e.g. Amazonas is divided into only 62 municipalities), and therefore they cover large areas incorporating several separated towns or villages that do not necessarily conform to one single conurbation. Southern and eastern states on the other hand, are divided into many small municipalities (e.g. Minas Gerais), and therefore large urban areas usually extend over several municipalities which form one single conurbation. More than a half of Brazilian municipalities have a population of lesser than 10,000 inhabitants.

The Federal District cannot be divided into municipalities, which is why its territory is composed of several administrative regions. These regions are directly managed by the government of the Federal District, which exercises constitutional and legal powers that are equivalent to those of the states, as well as those of the municipalities, thus simultaneously assuming all the obligations arising from them.

The 1988 Brazilian Constitution treats the municipalities as parts of the Federation and not simply dependent subdivisions of the states. Each municipality has an autonomous local government, comprising a mayor (prefeito) and a legislative body called municipal chamber (câmara municipal). Both the local government and the legislative body are directly elected by the population every four years. These elections take place at the same time all over the country; the last municipal elections were held in October 2024. Each municipality has the constitutional power to approve its own laws, as well as collecting taxes and receiving funds from the state and federal governments. However, municipal governments have no judicial power per se, and courts are only organised at the state or federal level. A subdivision of the state judiciary, or comarca, can either correspond to an individual municipality or encompass several municipalities.

The seat of the municipal administration is a designated city (cidade), with no legal specifications regarding minimum population, area, or facilities. The city always shares the same name as the municipality, as they are not considered separate entities. Municipalities can be subdivided, solely for administrative purposes, into districts—often, new municipalities are formed from these districts. Other populated areas are villages, but these have no legal status or regulation. Almost all municipalities are subdivided into neighbourhoods (bairros), although most municipalities do not officially define their neighbourhood limits (usually small cities in the countryside).

Municipalities can be split or merged to form new municipalities within the borders of the state, if the population of the involved municipalities expresses a desire to do so in a plebiscite. However, these must abide by the Brazilian Constitution, and forming exclaves or seceding from the state or union is expressly forbidden.

== Statistics ==
Code	State	Municipalities	Main
01	Acre	22	Municipalities of Acre
02	Alagoas	102	Municipalities of Alagoas
03	Amapá	16	Municipalities of Amapá
04	Amazonas	62	Municipalities of Amazonas
05	Bahia	417	Municipalities of Bahia
06	Ceará	184	Municipalities of Ceará
07	Espírito Santo	78	Municipalities of Espírito Santo
08	Goiás	246	Municipalities of Goiás
09	Maranhão	217	Municipalities of Maranhão
10	Mato Grosso	142	Municipalities of Mato Grosso
11	Mato Grosso do Sul	79	Municipalities of Mato Grosso do Sul
12	Minas Gerais	853	Municipalities of Minas Gerais
13	Pará	144	Municipalities of Pará
14	Paraíba	223	Municipalities of Paraíba
15	Paraná	399	Municipalities of Paraná
16	Pernambuco	184	Municipalities of Pernambuco
17	Piauí	224	Municipalities of Piauí
18	Rio de Janeiro	92	Municipalities of Rio de Janeiro
19	Rio Grande do Norte	167	Municipalities of Rio Grande do Norte
20	Rio Grande do Sul	497	Municipalities of Rio Grande do Sul
21	Rondônia	52	Municipalities of Rondônia
22	Roraima	15	Municipalities of Roraima
23	Santa Catarina	295	Municipalities of Santa Catarina
24	São Paulo	645	Municipalities of São Paulo
25	Sergipe	75	Municipalities of Sergipe
26	Tocantins	139	Municipalities of Tocantins

== Ranking of municipalities ==
=== By population ===
Rank	Municipality	State	Population (2026)
1	São Paulo	São Paulo	11,911,337
2	Rio de Janeiro	Rio de Janeiro	6,731,133
3	Brasília	Federal District	3,009,996
4	Fortaleza	Ceará	2,582,360
5	Salvador	Bahia	2,559,945
6	Belo Horizonte	Minas Gerais	2,415,451
7	Manaus	Amazonas	2,327,101
8	Curitiba	Paraná	1,832,183
9	Recife	Pernambuco	1,588,983
10	Goiânia	Goiás	1,511,709
5571	Serra da Saudade	Minas Gerais	857
5570	Anhanguera	Goiás	906
5569	Borá	São Paulo	935
5568	Araguainha	Mato Grosso	989
5567	Nova Castilho	São Paulo	1,070

=== By area ===
Data from the Brazilian Institute of Geography and Statistics.

Rank	Municipality	State	Area (km²)
1	Altamira	Pará	159,533.3
2	Barcelos	Amazonas	122,453.4
3	São Gabriel da Cachoeira	Amazonas	108,700.1
4	Oriximiná	Pará	107,560.1
5	Tapauá	Amazonas	84,697.7
6	São Félix do Xingu	Pará	84,212.8
7	Atalaia do Norte	Amazonas	76,313.4
8	Almeirim	Pará	72,968.5
9	Jutaí	Amazonas	68,971.1
10	Lábrea	Amazonas	68,349.9
5571	Águas de São Pedro	São Paulo	3,3
5570	Santa Cruz de Minas	Minas Gerais	3,5
5569	São Caetano do Sul	São Paulo	15,4
5568	Jandira	São Paulo	17,1
5567	Poá	São Paulo	17,2

== See also ==
- List of cities in South America
- Lists of cities
