= Intermediate Geographic Region of Barbacena =

Interurban administrative region in Minas Gerais, Brazil

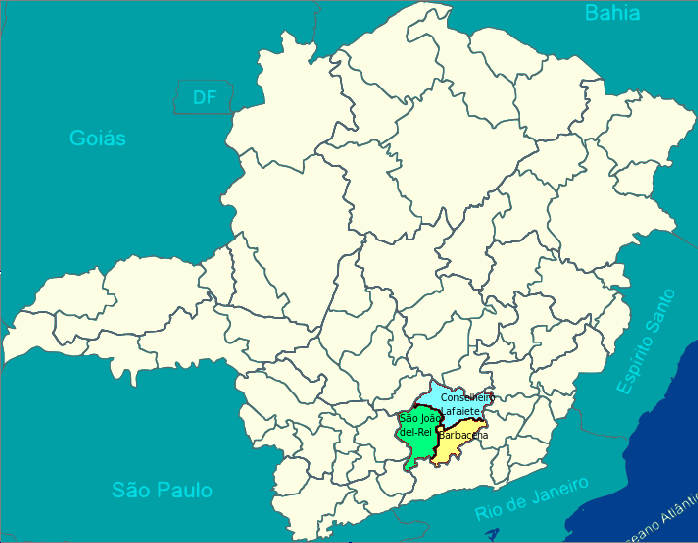
The Intermediate Geographic Region of Barbacena, in the state of Minas Gerais, Brazil.

The Intermediate Geographic Region of Barbacena (code 3107) is one of the 13 intermediate geographic regions in the Brazilian state of Minas Gerais and one of the 134 of Brazil, created by the National Institute of Geography and Statistics (IBGE) in 2017.

It comprises 49 municipalities, distributed in 3 immediate geographic regions:

- Immediate Geographic Region of Barbacena.
- Immediate Geographic Region of Conselheiro Lafaiete.
- Immediate Geographic Region of São João del-Rei.

== Statistics ==
- Population, estimation (IBGE), on July 1, 2018: 772 764 persons.
- Area: 15 259.188 km².
- Population density: 50.64 persons/km².

== See also ==
- List of Intermediate and Immediate Geographic Regions of Minas Gerais
