= Immediate Geographic Region of Barbacena =

Urban administrative region in Minas Gerais, Brazil

The Immediate Geographic Region of Barbacena is one of the 10 immediate geographic regions in the Intermediate Geographic Region of Barbacena, one of the 70 immediate geographic regions in the Brazilian state of Minas Gerais and one of the 509 of Brazil, created by the National Institute of Geography and Statistics (IBGE) in 2017.

== Municipalities ==
It comprises 14 municipalities:

- Alfredo Vasconcelos
- Alto Rio Doce
- Antônio Carlos
- Barbacena
- Barroso
- Cipotânea
- Desterro do Melo
- Dores de Campos
- Ibertioga
- Ressaquinha
- Santa Bárbara do Tugúrio
- Santa Rita de Ibitipoca
- Santana do Garambéu
- Senhora dos Remédios

== Statistics ==
Population: 236 918 (July 1, 2017 estimation).

Area: 3 929,628 km^{2}.

Population density: 60,3/km^{2}.

== See also ==
- List of Intermediate and Immediate Geographic Regions of Minas Gerais
