= Estrada de Ferro Oeste de Minas =

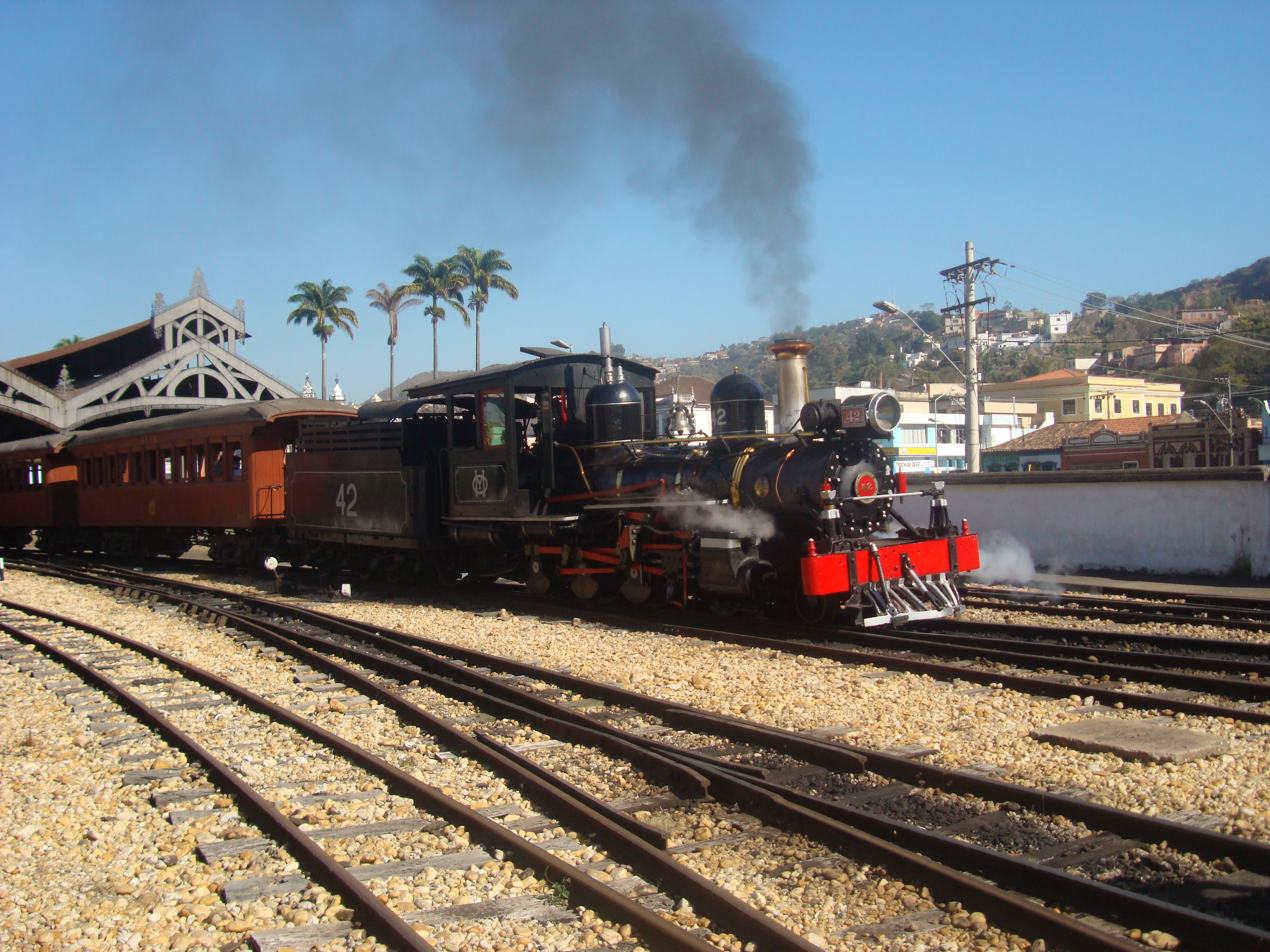
Maria Fumaça of EFOM in São João del-Rei station

The Estrada de Ferro Oeste de Minas (EFOM) was a 2 ft 6 in (762 mm) narrow-gauge railway located in the southeastern Brazilian state of Minas Gerais. At its peak the railway's route totalled 775 km (482 mi). A portion of the railway still operates as a heritage railway, and one of the major stations (São João del Rei) is now Brazil's largest railway museum.

== History ==
5 ft 3 in (1,600 mm) railways entered Minas Gerais in the 1870s, pushing towards the city of Belo Horizonte. Almost immediately attention turned to the construction of narrow-gauge feeder lines. In 1872 Provincial President Dr. Joaquim Floriano de Godoy signed into law approval for a narrow-gauge railway from the broad-gauge line heading west towards a navigable point on the Rio Grande. A subsequent law in 1877 limited the railway to initially building only as far as São João del Rei. A company, the Companhia Estrada de Ferro Oeste de Minas, was established in 1878, and a decision was made to make the junction with the broad gauge at Sítio (Antônio Carlos).

The gauge of 2 ft 6 in (762 mm) was chosen in 1879. The exact reason for the choice of gauge is not known; one theory is that an American engineer was familiar with the Ferrocarril de Antofagasta a Bolivia in Chile. In any case, construction was begun in June 1879, with the first section opening between Sitio and Barrosso in September 1880. The line was opened through to São João del Rei on 28 August 1881 by the Emperor Dom Pedro II.

The company sought permission to extend the railway and over the subsequent 15 years built a number of extensions until it reached Paraopeba. Apart from a small number of short branches, the railway was more or less complete by 1894. During this time the line had been reasonably profitable, returning small dividends. However, in 1894 the railway barely broke even, and following years brought losses. By April 1900 the company was in liquidation, and a month and a half strike by employees was only halted when the State government paid their back pay. The entire railway was placed up for auction on 13 June 1903 and purchased by the Federal Treasury.

Several branches were constructed in the period up to 1923, but no extensions after that date. Operation of the line was divested to the State government in 1931. In the meantime, 1,000 mm (3 ft 3 3/8 in) metre gauge had been adopted as the primary gauge for secondary lines in Brazil. Lines radiating to the west from Belo Horizonte crossed the railway at Divinópolis and Velho Dataipa. By 1953, control of the railway reverted to the Federal government. During the period 1960 to 1965 most of the railway was either closed or converted to metre gauge. Only the section from Antônio Carlos to Aureliano Mourão was retained.

The Antônio Carlos line survived mainly on limestone traffic associated with a cement plant. Passenger traffic declined to a single coach attached to a daily mixed train. However, as the 1970s progressed, the line became more popular with tourists, and passenger traffic grew dramatically. In 1983 the closure of the cement plant brought the closure of the majority of the line, with only the section from Tiradentes to São João Del Rei being retained as a tourist line.

== Route ==
The main line route was shaped like an "L". The line headed west from the junction at Antonio Carlos, through São João Del Rei, to Aureliano Mourão. From Aureliano Mourao the line headed north through Divinopolis and Pompeu to the terminal at Paraopeba. A branch ran from Aureliano Mourão south-west to the head of navigation on the Rio Grande at Riberao Vermelho. The sections, with distances and dates of opening and closing, are listed below:

Main line – 602 km (374 mi) total length

- Antônio Carlos – Barroso 49 km (30 mi) 1880–1983
- Barroso – Tiradentes 37 km (23 mi) 1881–1983
- Tiradentes – São João del Rei 13 km (8.1 mi) 1881–present. Preserved section.
- São João Del Rei – Aureliano Mourão 104 km (65 mi) 1883–1983
- Aureliano Mourão – Oliveira 69 km (43 mi) 1888–c.1960 metre gauge
- Oliveira – Divinópolis 84 km (52 mi) 1890–c.1960 metre gauge
- Divinopolis – São Gonçalo do Pará 27 km (17 mi) 1890–1965
- São Gonsalo do Para – Velho Dataipa 55 km (34 mi) 1891–1965
- Velho Dataipa – Martinho Campos 72 km (45 mi) 1891–1964
- Martinho Campos – Pompéu 36 km (22 mi) 1891–1962
- Pompeu – Paraopeba 57 km (35 mi) 1894–1960

Branch lines

- Ghagas Doria – Águas Santas 12 km (7.5 mi) 1910–1966
- Aureliano Mourão – Marcaia 19 km (12 mi) 1887–c.1960 metre gauge
- Marcaia – Riberao Vermelho 30 km (19 mi) 1888–1966
- Riberao Vermelho – Lavras 9 km (5.6 mi) dual gauge with metre gauge 1908–1965
- Goncalves Ferreira – Itapecerica 35 km (22 mi) 1891–c.1960
- Goncalves Ferreira – Claudio 26 km (16 mi) 1912–c.1960
- Martinho Campos – Pitanguy 5 km (3.1 mi) 1907–? metre gauge
- Barbacena – Campolide 10 km (6.2 mi) c.1923–1965

== Locomotives ==
The first two locomotives purchased by the company were from the Baldwin Locomotive Works, and were described as being of the "Montesuma" type. They had a 4-4-0 wheel arrangement, and weighed about 13 tons, plus tender. Further 4-4-0s followed, and as the railway grew also 4-6-0s and 2-8-0s. Some of the larger locomotives were up to about 25 tons in weight. Initially the locomotives used wood as a fuel, however later they were converted to oil.

In all 58 locomotives were built for the railway. Baldwin built all but five, with three being built by American Locomotive Company (ALCo), and two in the railway's own workshops. These included the last locomotive acquired by the railway, a 2-8-0 constructed in 1920. Records indicate this locomotive was built for about half the cost of an imported locomotive, but performed equally well.

Sixteen locomotives survived to the final closure of the railway, and were subsequently preserved, including locomotive number 1.

== Rio Grande navigation ==
The EFOM met the Rio Grande at Riberao Vermelho, from where the railway ran a steam navigation service down the river for 208 km, as far as Capetina. There were six stations on the river between Riberao Vermelho and Capetinga, and a passenger and freight service was operated between 1889 and 1963. The railway operated a fleet of 6 stern-wheel paddle steamers, together with barges and launches.

== Preservation and museum ==
At the time of the final closure in 1983 the railway was attracting increasing numbers of tourists. A decision was made to turn the substantial station, workshops and roundhouse in São João del Rei into a railway museum. Fourteen locomotives, as well as the remaining rolling stock was brought to São João del Rei, together with a number of items of metre gauge equipment. The roundhouse had to be rebuilt after a fire in 1972. The new museum became the largest railway museum in Brazil, and was opened in August 1984.

At the same time a 13 km stretch of track to Tiradentes was retained for the tourist railway operation. Regular passenger trains are operated over this stretch of track, using the original equipment of the railway. Trains are run on Fridays, Saturdays, Sundays, and public holidays. Occasional lineside fires caused by sparks igniting brushwood have been acclaimed as adding to the experience.
