= Dores =

Dores may refer to:

== People ==
- Sir Alexander Fraser of Dores, British physician
- Bruno Fernandes das Dores (born 1984), Brazilian murderer and football player
- Dores André, Spanish ballet dancer
- Janat Dores, founder of Janat
- Tiago Dores, member of Gato Fedorento

== Places ==
- Dores, Highland, United Kingdom
- Dores de Campos, Brazil
- Dores de Guanhães, Brazil
- Dores do Indaiá, Brazil
- Dores do Rio Preto, Brazil
- Dores do Turvo, Brazil
- Dorés Lake, Canada
- Largo das Dores, Portugal
