= Desterro do Melo =

Coordinates: 21°09′S 43°31′W

- Municipality
- Municipality of Desterro do Melo
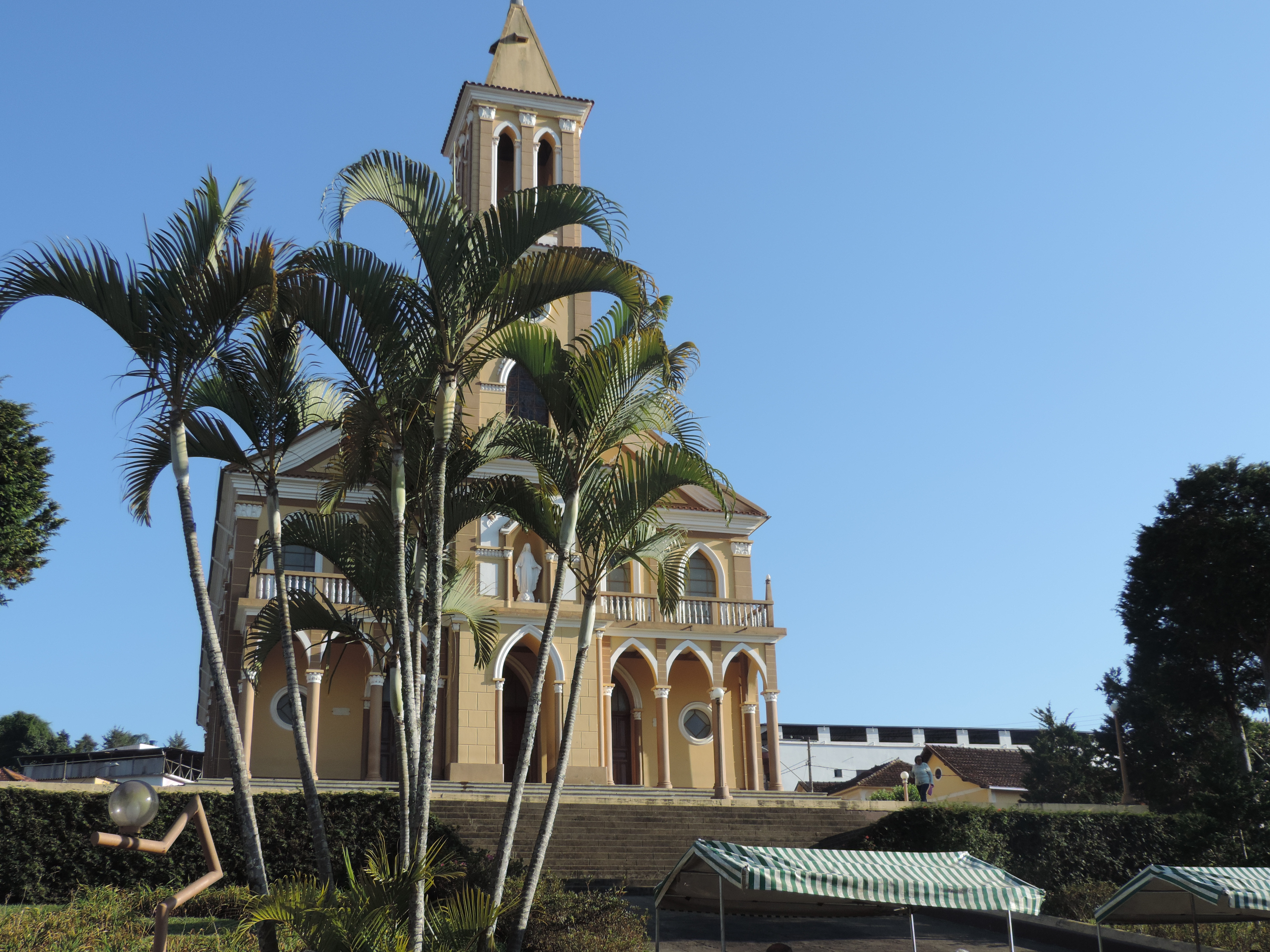

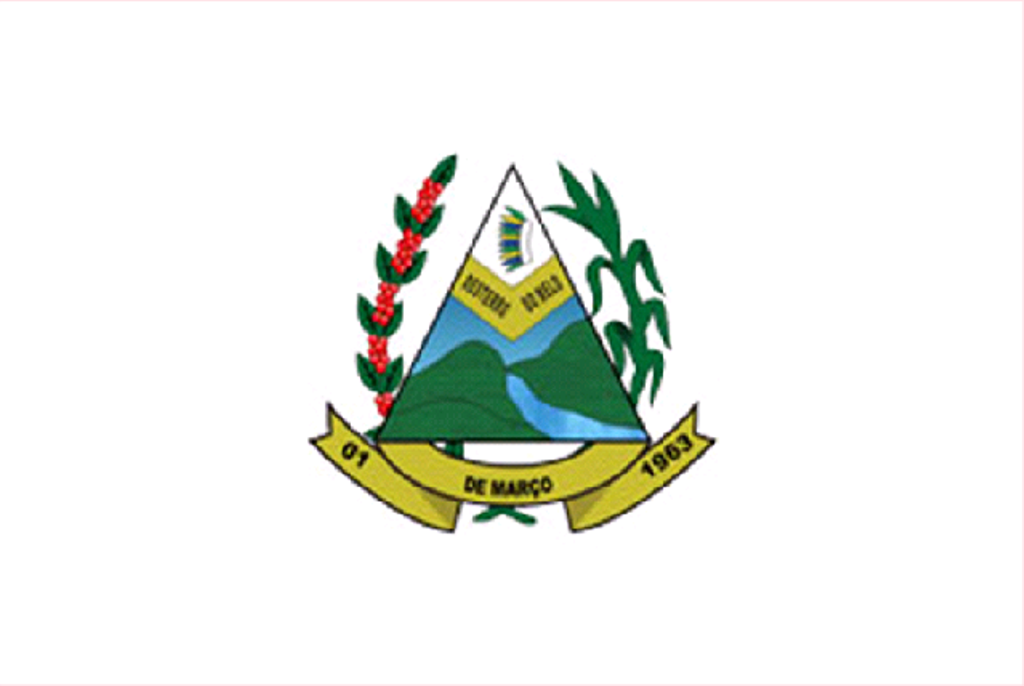
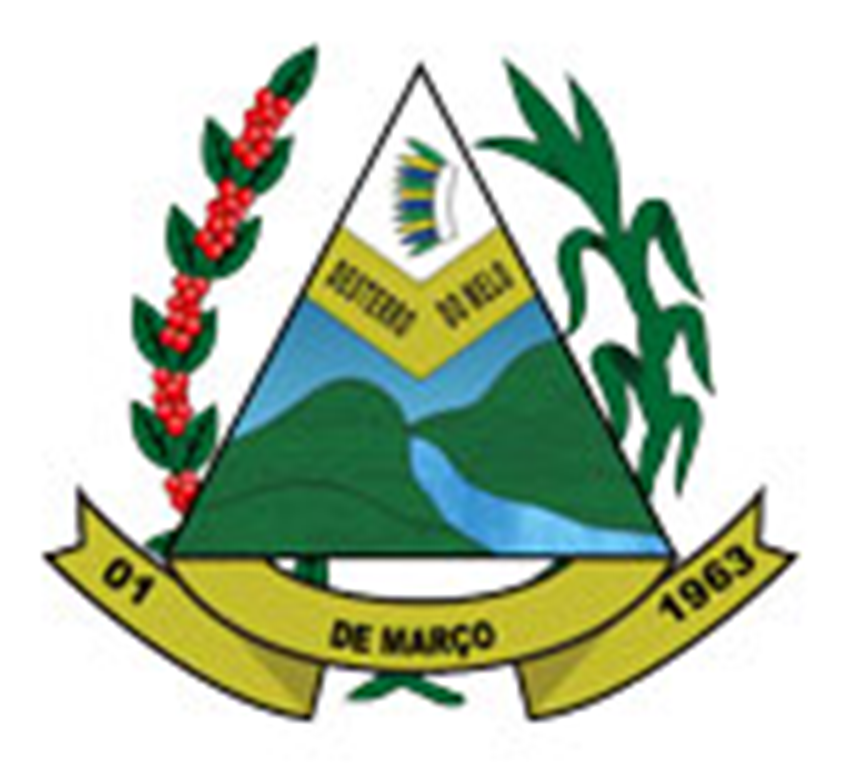
- Flag Coat of arms

- Location in the state of Minas Gerais
- Country: Brazil
- State: Minas Gerais
- Region: Southeast
- Intermediate Region: Barbacena
- Immediate Region: Barbacena
- Founded: 1 March 1963

Government
  - Mayor: Mayara García Lopes da Silva Tafuri (PTB)

Area
  - Total: 142.279 km^{2} (54.934 sq mi)
- Elevation: 1,085 m (3,560 ft)

Population (2022 Census)
  - Total: 2,994
  - Estimate (2025): 3,060
  - Density: 21.04/km^{2} (54.50/sq mi)
- Demonym: melense
- Time zone: UTC−3 (BRT)
- Postal Code: 36210-000 to 36211-999
- HDI (2010): 0.631 – medium
- Website: www.desterrodomelo.mg.gov.br

Desterro do Melo is a Brazilian municipality located in the south of the state of Minas Gerais.

== Overview ==
Its population in 2023 was 3,060 people in a total area of 142 km². The altitude of the municipal seat is 1,085 meters. The city belongs to the mesoregion of Campo das Vertentes and to the microregion of Barbacena.

Desterro do Melo lies to the east of Barbacena and is connected to this regional center b MG-135. The distance is 35 km. The region is characterized by low mountains, many of which still retain natural tropical forest. Like most of the municipalities in this region there is cultivation of coffee, bananas, rice, sugarcane, beans, and corn. Farms are small and cattle raising is mainly for milk and cheese production. In 2007 there were 293 automobiles in the municipality. There was one health clinic, 5 primary schools, and one middle school (2005).

Municipal Human Development Index

- MHDI ranking: .689
- State ranking: 594 out of 853 municipalities
- National ranking: 3,170 out of 5,138 municipalities
- Life expectancy: 69
- Literacy rate: 77

== See also ==
- List of municipalities in Minas Gerais
