= Hospital Colônia de Barbacena =

Former psychiatric hospital in Brazil

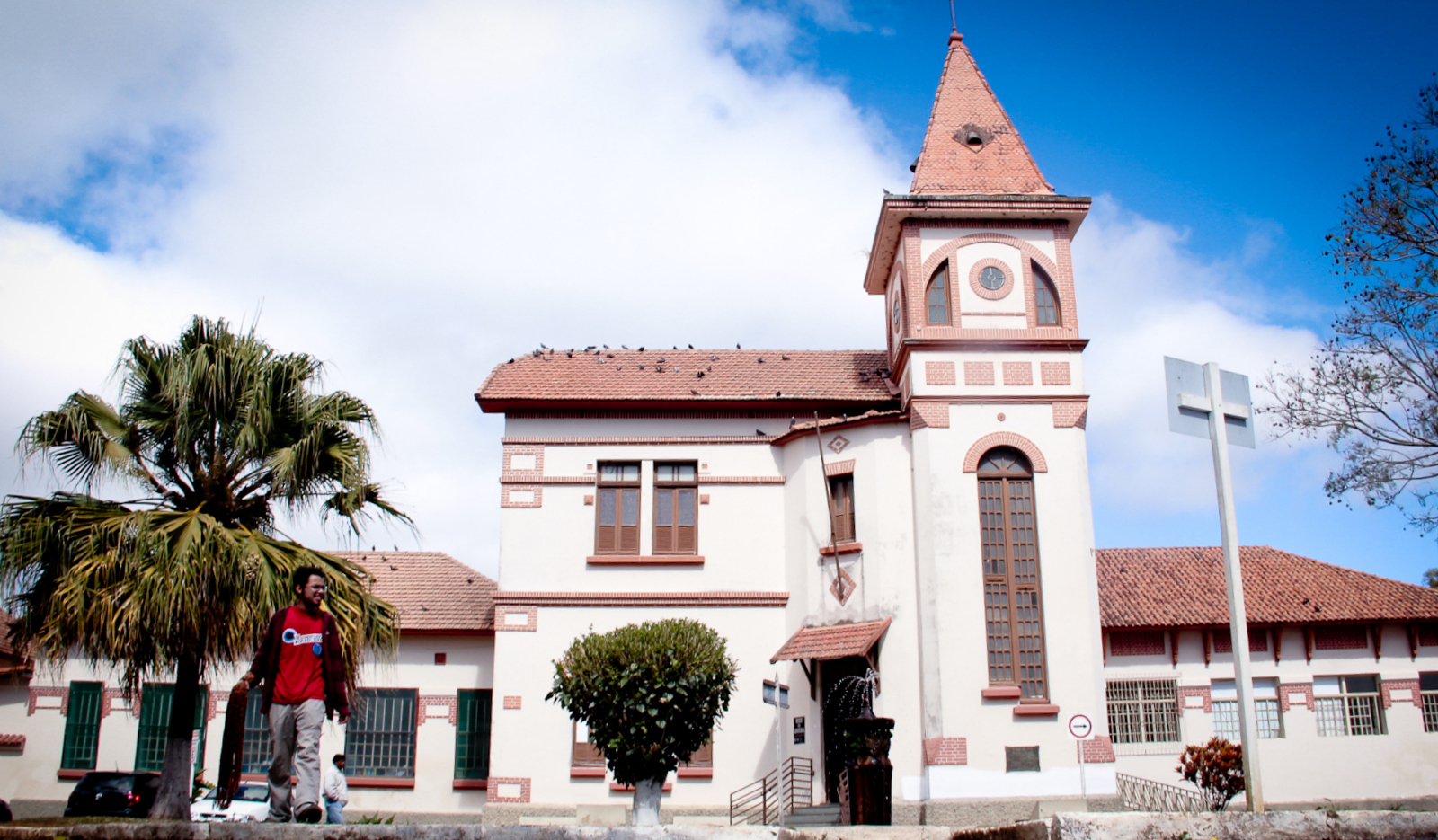
- Façade of the building in 2012

Geography
- Location: Barbacena, Minas Gerais, Brazil
- Coordinates: 21.20479°S 43.78694°W

Organisation
- Type: Psychiatric hospital

History
- Opened: 1903
- Closed: 1980

Links
- Museu da Loucura
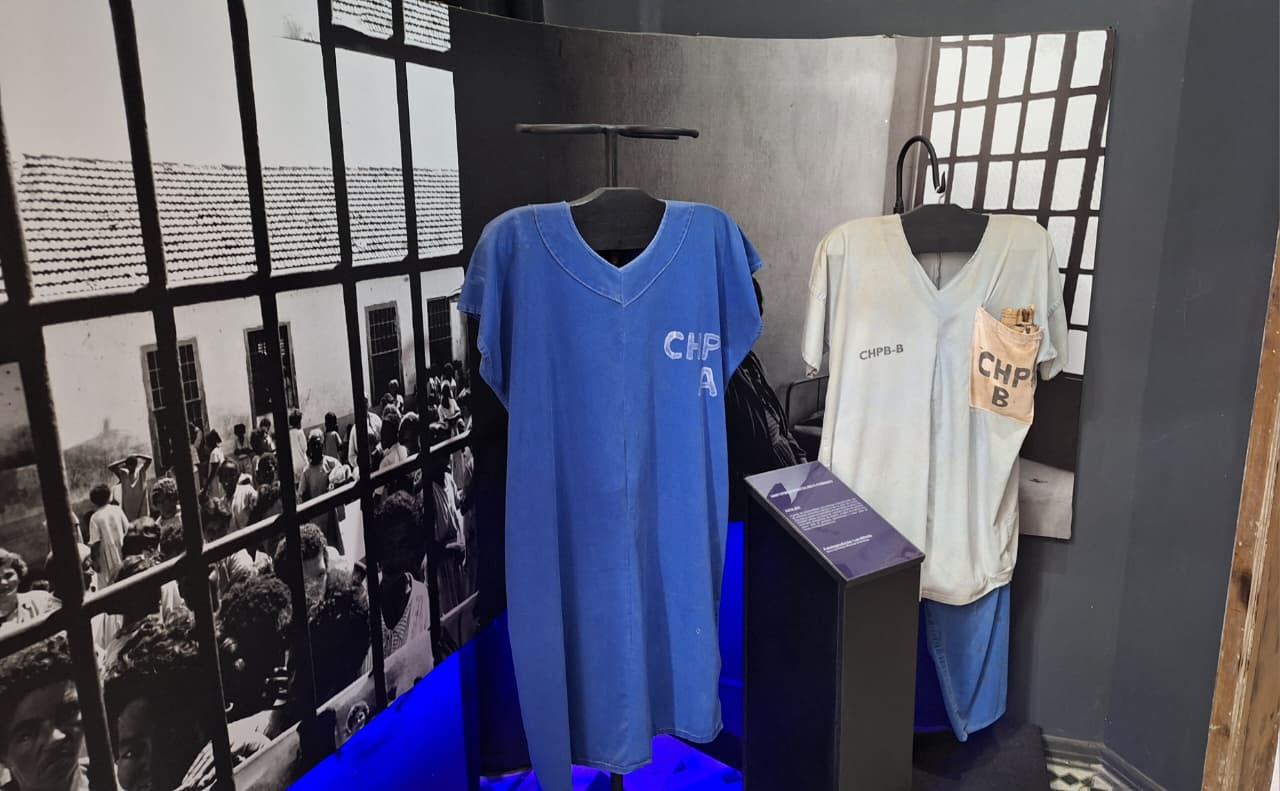
- Uniforms exposed next to a picture of the overcrowded colony hospital.
- Established: 1996
- Type: Medical museum

Hospital Colônia de Barbacena (Portuguese for 'Colony Hospital of Barbacena') was a psychiatric hospital located in the Brazilian city of Barbacena, Minas Gerais. From its foundation in 1903 until its closure in 1980, the Colônia has been a place of genocide; official estimates report over 60,000 deaths occurred inside the wards due to cruel, inhuman or degrading treatment tantamounted to medical torture over the years. Italian Psychiatrist Franco Basaglia compared the place to a Nazi concentration camp. In 2013, Brazilian journalist Daniela Arbex published O Holocausto Brasileiro ('The Brazilian Holocaust'), an investigative book telling the stories of victims and survivors. The institution is a central feature of the history of mental health services in Brazil and a major motivator for the national anti-asylum movement.

The building was repurposed and since 1996 it functions as a museum, the "Museu da Loucura" (Brazilian Portuguese for 'Museum of madness').

== History ==
The hospital was founded in 1903 and its first director was Dr. Joaquim Antônio Dutra. Colônia had capacity to give shelter to 200 patients. Located in the city of Barbacena, 102 miles away from the capital of the State of Minas Gerais, Belo Horizonte and in the heart of the Mantiqueira Mountains, the place became a national symbol of psychiatric care in the 20th century. Whether or not requiring medical attention, people were sent by train to Barbacena from all parts of Brazil. These transports were so common they originated the regional expression "trem de doido" (Brazilian Portuguese for 'madmen's train' / 'crazy train'). By 1960, Colônia was operating heavily over capacity and had over 5,000 patients.

The patients were subjected to forced labor, including children, elders and persons with disabilities. Most of them were always only partially dressed, some were fully naked. On average, over 16 persons died per day due to sickness, malnutrition, hypothermic shock as a consequence of cold water exposure, electroconvulsive therapy or murder. The staff benefited from the remains of the dead patients, as they were often smuggled to universities across the country. Whenever the demand was low, corpses were simply dissolved in acid or buried in nearby grounds. Over 70% of the patients were never diagnosed with any sort of mental disorder, yet virtually all of them were placed under permanent care, mostly because of political interests and social stigma. These patients were often alcoholics, epileptics, prostitutes, homosexuals, unwanted children, homeless people, women whose virginity was lost before marriage, enemies of the local elite or simply considered "inadequate" according to social norms, such as shy men and women with a sense of leadership. It is also notorious the fact that a significant proportion of the population in Colônia was of African ancestry.

In 1980, due to pressure in the mass media, the national anti-asylum movement managed to shut down the institution and transfer the very few survivors to be placed under proper care while receiving indemnification from the state.

By 1996, the building became the house of the "Museu da Loucura" (Brazilian Portuguese for 'Museum of madness'), a medical museum dedicated to the history of psychiatry in Brazil.

== In popular culture ==
- The controversial 2016 Brazilian documentary O Holocausto Brasileiro (The Brazilian Holocaust) is based on the book of the same name written by Daniela Arbex and tells the entire story of Hospital Colônia, from its foundation to the discovery of the countless disturbing cases of abuse that occurred there.
- The Hospital Colônia de Barbacena and the countless cases of human rights abuses that occurred there are the main theme of the Brazilian drama TV series Colônia (broadcast by the pay TV channel Canal Brasil and the Brazilian streaming service Globoplay). The series (set in the 70s, during the Brazilian military regime) shows the shocking and macabre events that took place at Hospital Colônia from the point of view of the series' protagonist, Elisa (played by Fernanda Marques), a young patient at Hospital Colônia who is four months pregnant and was admitted forced into this place by her cruel and greedy father, who was enraged by her pregnancy, as her pregnancy hindered his plans to marry her off to a rich farmer (since she got pregnant by another man who wasn't this rich farmer).
- In Joker: the World from DC Comics, an Anthology Comic featuring work from comic creators around the world, the Brazilian Creative Team of writer Felipe Castilho, Artist/Letterer Tianan Rocha, and Colorist Mariane Gusmão have the Joker transferred to an Arkham Asylum Franchise location called Arkham Colonia. In while being processed Joker has a haircut by a man who says he's "not afraid. I once met the greatest killer of all." The barber then recounts the horrors of the Hospital Colonia. When the Joker attempts to escape and is confronted by Batman he says, "Look I'm jealous. Killers made of concrete, endorsed by politicians? That's hard to compete with!" He then begs Batman to take him home to Gotham City.
- "Trem De Doido", a song by Lô Borges published on his 1972 album Clube da Esquina with Milton Nascimento, was inspired by the "crazy trains" that led new interns to the Hospital Colônia de Barbacena.

== See also ==
- Brazilian anti-asylum movement
- Genocide of Barbacena
