= Alfredo Vasconcelos =

City in Brazilian state of Minas Gerais

Coordinates: 21°08′42″S 43°46′37″W

- Municipality
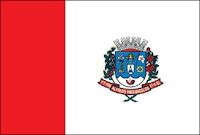
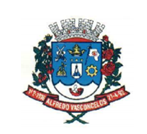
- Flag Coat of arms
- Interactive map of Alfredo Vasconcelos
- Country: Brazil
- State: Minas Gerais
- Region: Southeast

Population (2022 Census)
  - Total: 6,931
  - Estimate (2025): 7,236
- Time zone: UTC−3 (BRT)

Location of Alfredo Vasconcelos

Alfredo Vasconcelos is a city in the south of the Brazilian state of Minas Gerais. In 2025 its population was estimated to be 7,236 in a total area of 130.8 km^{2} (50.5 sq mi). It belongs to the Barbacena IBGE statistical microregion. It lies just north of Barbacena on the important BR-040 highway, which links Brasília to Rio de Janeiro.

== See also ==
- List of municipalities in Minas Gerais
