= Ibertioga =

Municipality of Minas Gerais, Brazil

- Municipality
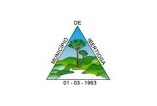
- Flag Coat of arms
- Interactive map of Ibertioga
- Country: Brazil
- State: Minas Gerais
- Region: Southeast

Population (2022 Census)
  - Total: 5,198
  - Estimate (2025): 5,346
- Time zone: UTC−3 (BRT)

Location of Ibertioga within Minas Gerais

Ibertioga is a Brazilian municipality located in the state of Minas Gerais. The city belongs to the mesoregion of Campo das Vertentes and to the microregion of Barbacena. In 2025, the estimated population was 5,346.

== See also ==
- List of municipalities in Minas Gerais
