= Barroso, Minas Gerais =

Barroso
- Municipality
- Municipality of Barroso
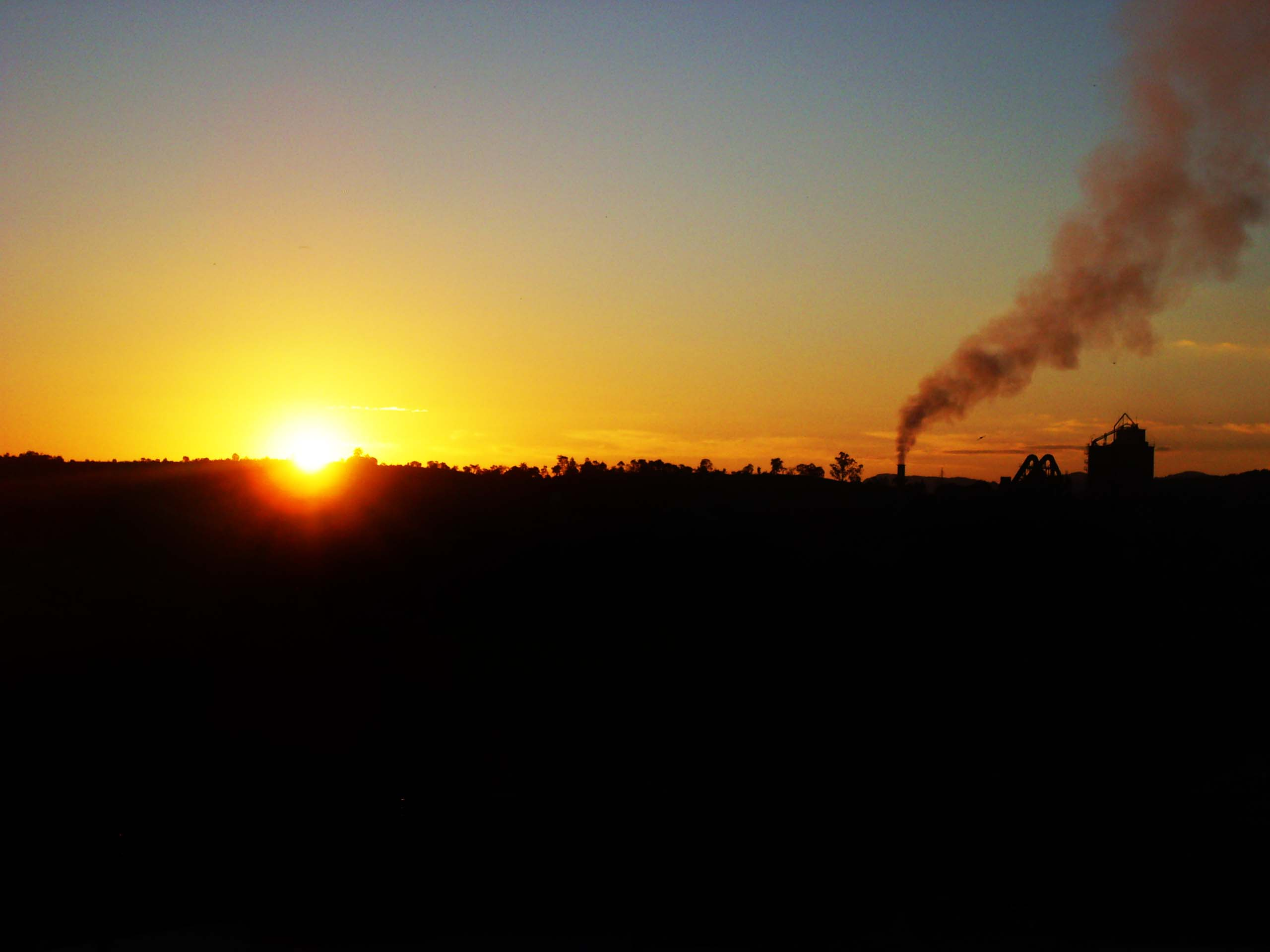

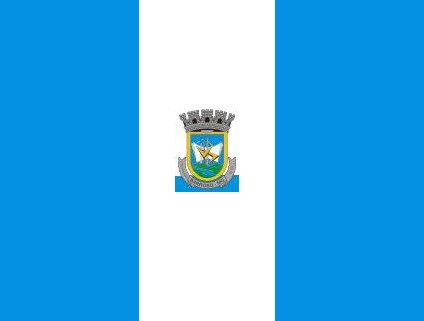
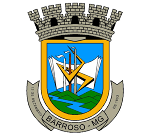
- Flag Coat of arms
- Nickname: "Cidade do Cimento" (Cement City)
- Location in the state of Minas Gerais

- Location in Brazil
- Coordinates: 21°11′13″S 43°58′33″W
- Country: Brazil
- Region: Southeast
- State: Minas Gerais
- Founded: 17th Century
- Incorporated (as city): December 12, 1953

Government
  - Mayor: Eika Oka de Melo (Progressive Party (2013–2016))

Area
  - Total: 81.726 km^{2} (31.555 sq mi)
- Elevation: 929 m (3,048 ft)

Population (2022 Census)
  - Total: 20,080
  - Estimate (2025): 20,604
- Demonym: Barrosense
- Time zone: UTC−3 (BRT)
  - Summer (DST): UTC−2 (BRST)
- Postal Code: 36212-000
- Area code: (+55) 32
- Website: www.barroso.mg.gov.br

Barroso is a Brazilian municipality located in the south of the state of Minas Gerais. Its population as of 2025 was 20,604 people living in an area of 82.07 km^{2} (31.69 sq mi). The elevation is 920 meters (3,020 ft). The city belongs to the mesoregion of Campo das Vertentes and to the microregion of Barbacena. An important regional center, Barbacena, is located 27 km (17 mi) to the east and is connected by MG-265.

== Geography ==
According to IBGE (2017), the municipality is in the Immediate Geographic Region of Barbacena, in the Intermediate Geographic Region of Barbacena.

=== Ecclesiastical circumscription ===
The municipality is part of the Roman Catholic Diocese of São João del-Rei.

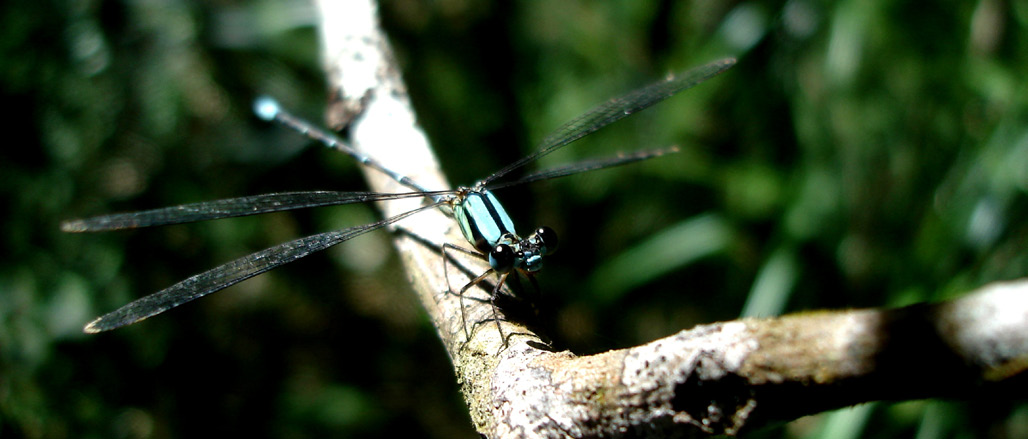
Heteragrion cyane is an endemic species of dragonfly in Barroso

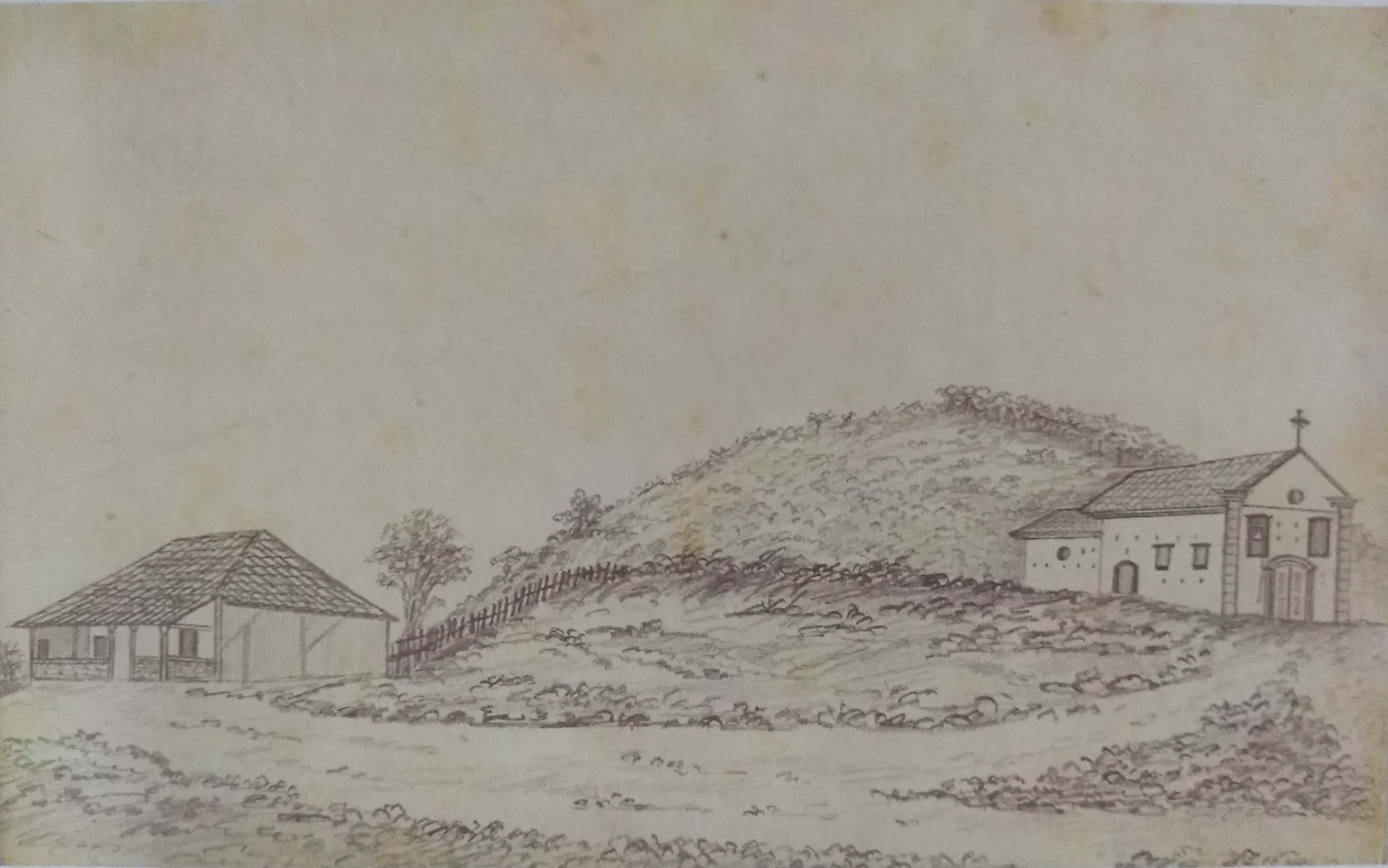
Barroso, 1839

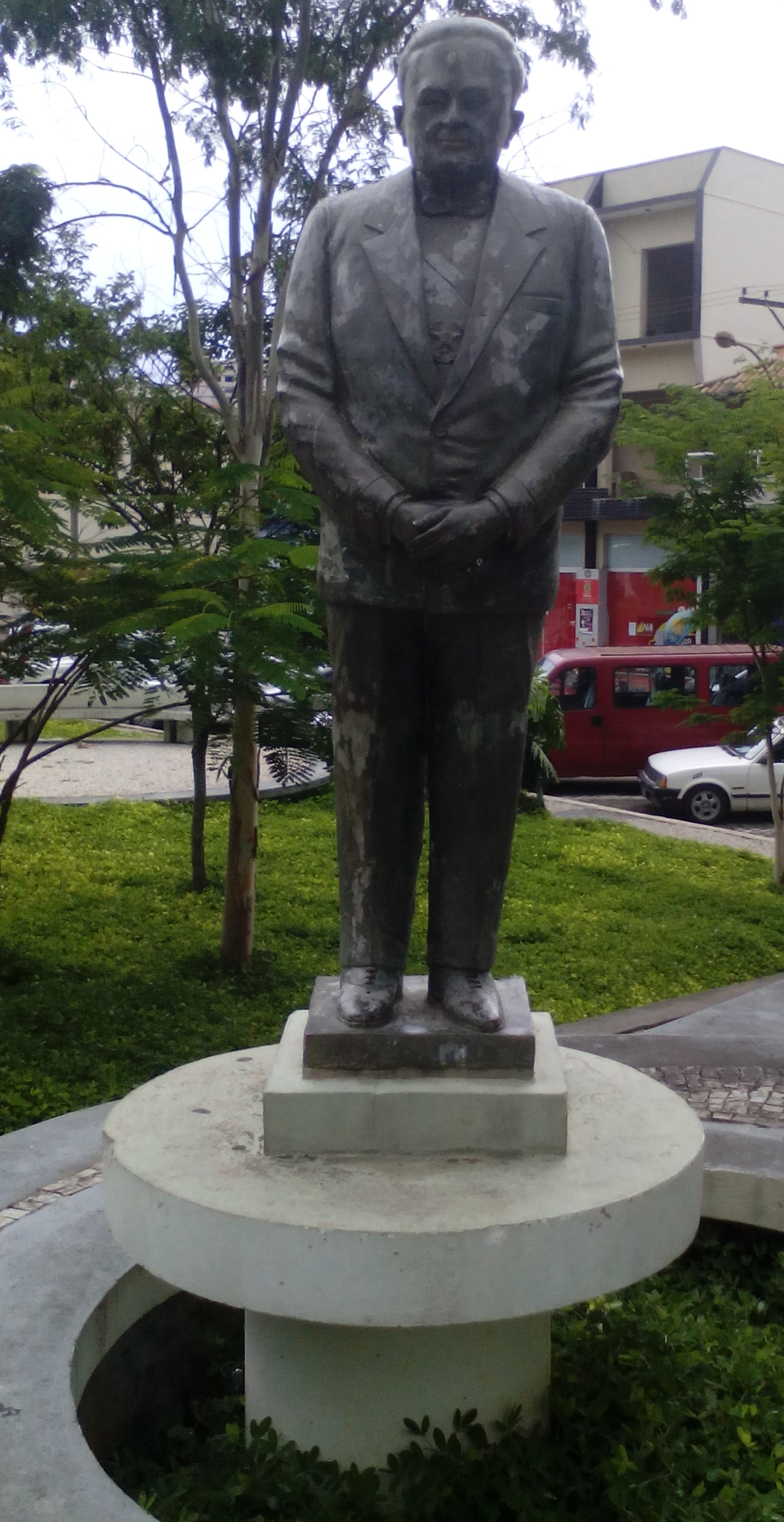
Statue of Humberto de Alencar Castelo Branco in Santana Square (2016)

== See also ==
- List of municipalities in Minas Gerais
