= Sobral – O Homem que Não Tinha Preço =

2013 film directed by Paula Fiuza

- Theatrical release poster
- Directed by: Paula Fiuza
- Starring: Heráclito Fontoura Sobral Pinto
- Distributed by: Art Films
- Release date: 11 October 2013
- Running time: 87 minutes
- Country: Brazil
- Language: Portuguese

Sobral – O Homem que Não Tinha Preço is a 2013 Brazilian documentary film directed by Paula Fiuza about the jurist Sobral Pinto, who faced the dictatorship in Brazil and became one of the greatest defenders of human rights in the country's history.
