= Daniela Arbex =

Brazilian journalist

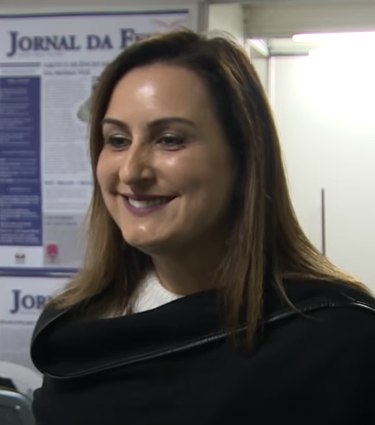
- Born: April 19, 1973 (age 53); Juiz de Fora, Brazil
- Occupations: Journalist; Writer
- Years active: 1995–present
- Spouse: Marcos Arbex
- Children: 1

Daniela Arbex (born in Juiz de Fora on April 19, 1973) is a Brazilian journalist and writer, known by non-fictional books about human rights abuses.

== About ==
Born to a Syrian immigrant father who fled Syria as a child, Daniela earned a degree in Communications by Universidade Federal de Juiz de Fora, Arbex began her career in Brazilian newspaper Tribuna de Minas in 1995, where remains employed as a special reporter until today.

In spite of being employed in a city quite smaller when compared to southeastern metropolis like São Paulo and Rio de Janeiro, she still managed to gain prestige as an investigative reporter, mostly after authoring "Cova 312" series ("Tombstone 312"), published in 2002, where she searched for the tombstone of urban guerilla member Milton Soares de Castro, a prisoner during the Brazilian Military Government whose status was unknown. Due to her achievements, she was rewarded with Esso Awards and received honorary mentions on Prêmio Vladimir Herzog and Prêmio Lorenzo Natali.

In 2010, another coverage for Tribuna de Minas about Brazilian SUS's inefficiency rewarded her with the Knight International Journalism Award.

In 2013 and 2014, she released "O Holocausto Brasileiro" in Brazil and Portugal respectively. The book reveals about the Genocide of Barbacena, where over 60.000 people perished inside the wardens of a mental asylum, known as Hospital Colônia de Barbacena in Minas Gerais.

She currently resides in Juiz de Fora, with her husband Marcos and son, Diego.

== Awards ==
- 2014: 2nd rank in Prêmio Jabuti of non-fictional books;
- 2014: Prêmio Carrano of Anti-Asylum Movement and Human Rights;
- 2013: Winner prêmio da Associação Paulista de Críticos de Artes (APCA) in category for best literary book with "Holocausto Brasileiro", elected the best non-fictional book of the year;
- 2012: Winner of Prêmio Esso in category Regional West Central;
- 2012: Honorary Mentions on Prêmio IPYS de Melhor Investigação Jornalística da América Latina e Caribe (Transparência Internacional e Instituto Prensa y Sociedad) with Holocausto brasileiro- elected the best investigation from Colpin 2012;
- 2010: Winner of Knight International Journalism Award (United States);
- 2009: Winner of Prêmio IPYS de Melhor Investigação Jornalística de um Caso de Corrupção na América Latina e Caribe (Transparência Internacional e Instituto Prensa y Sociedad);
- Honorary Mention on Prêmio Vladimir Herzog- Special education category;
- 2004: Winner of Prêmio Inclusão Social Saúde Mental;
- Imprensa Embratel Awards: Finalist Southeastern Region;
- 2002: Winner of Prêmio Esso - Special inner category;
- Honorary Mentions on Prêmio Vladimir Herzog;
- Honorary Mentions on Prêmio Lorenzo Natali (Belgium);
- 2000: Winner of Prêmio Esso de Jornalismo - categoria especial interior;
- 1999: Finalist of Prêmio Ayrton Senna de Jornalismo- printed category;
- 1998: Finalist of Prêmio Ayrton Senna de Jornalismo- printed category;
- 1996, 1997, 1998, 1999, 2000: Winner of Prêmio Eloísio Furtado conceded by Tribuna de Minas to best coverage of the year.

=== Decorations ===
- 2013: Honors conceded by Municipal Chamber of Barbacena;
- 2010: Title of Worthy Citizen of Juiz de Fora;
- 2005: Tribute by Comenda Henrique Halfeld;
- 2000: Diplomada Jornalista Amiga da Criança by Agência de Notícias dos Direitos da Infância de Brasília.

== See also ==
- Hospital Colônia de Barbacena
- Genocide of Barbacena
