= Isabel Cristina =

Brazilian Blessed and martyr

Blessed Isabel Cristina Mrad Campos
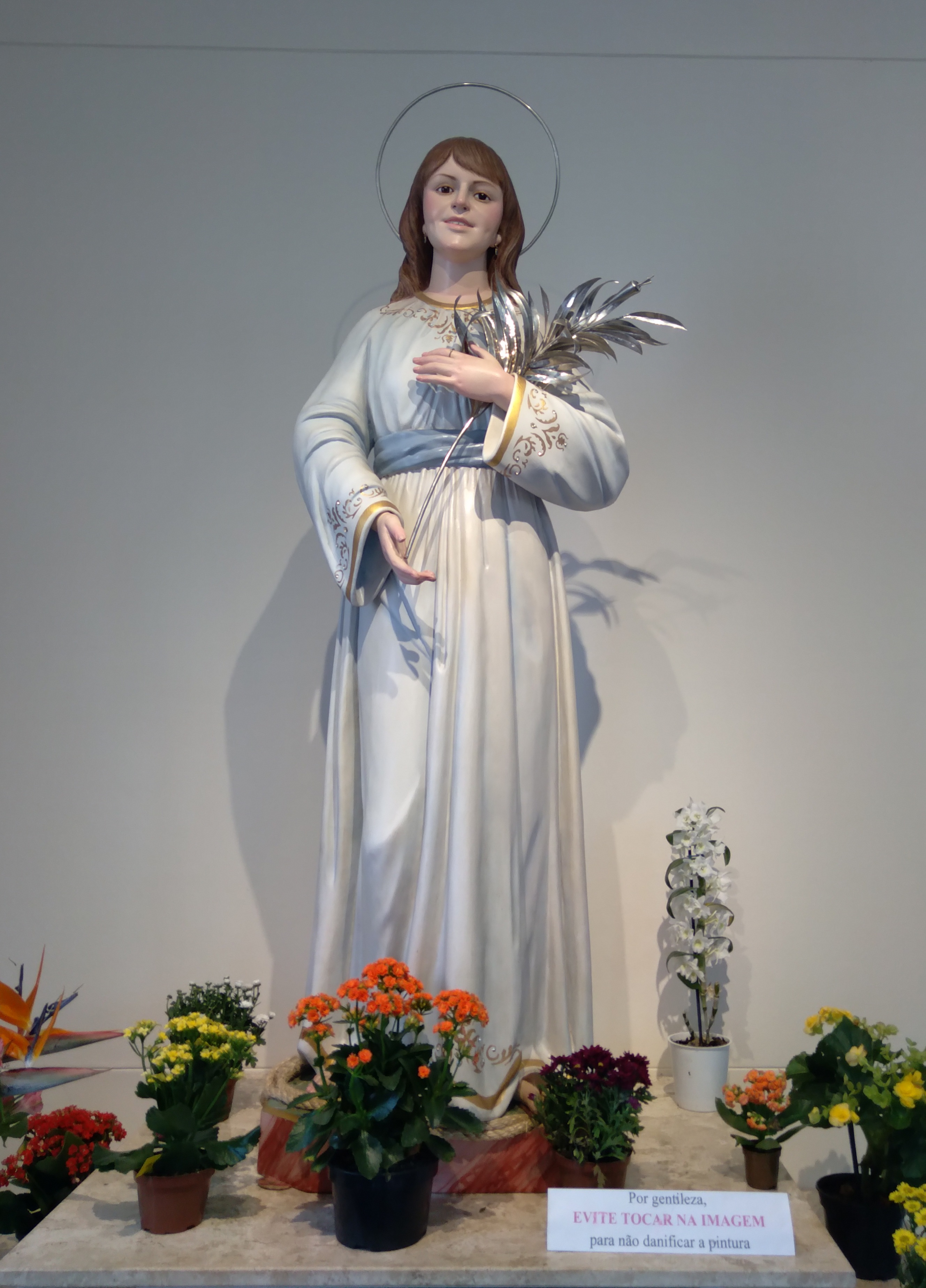
- Statue of Isabel Cristina in a church dedicated to her

Virgin and martyr
- Born: 29 July 1962; Barbacena, Minas Gerais, Brazil
- Died: 1 September 1982 (aged 20); Juiz de Fora, Minas Gerais, Brazil
- Venerated in: Roman Catholic Church
- Beatified: 10 December 2022, Parque de Exposições Senador Bias Fortes, Barbacena, Brazil by Cardinal Raymundo Damasceno Assis
- Major shrine: Chapel of Blessed Isabel Cristina, Barbacena, Minas Gerais, Brazil
- Feast: 1 September
- Attributes: white tunic, rosary ring, lilies, roses and martyr's palm
- Patronage: College students

Isabel Cristina Mrad Campos (29 July 1962 – 1 September 1982) was a Brazilian Catholic laywoman. She served as a Vincentian in her parish, although she never formally joined the movement. In her spare time, she devoted herself to faith. She was often seen doing Eucharistic adoration and attending Mass. She wanted to study medicine and become a pediatrician to take care of underprivileged children, but was murdered in her apartment after an attempted rape.

Her beatification process began on 26 January 2001. On 27 October 2020, Pope Francis approved the beatification, which was held on 10 December 2022. She is the first martyr of the Brazilian state of Minas Gerais.

== Life ==
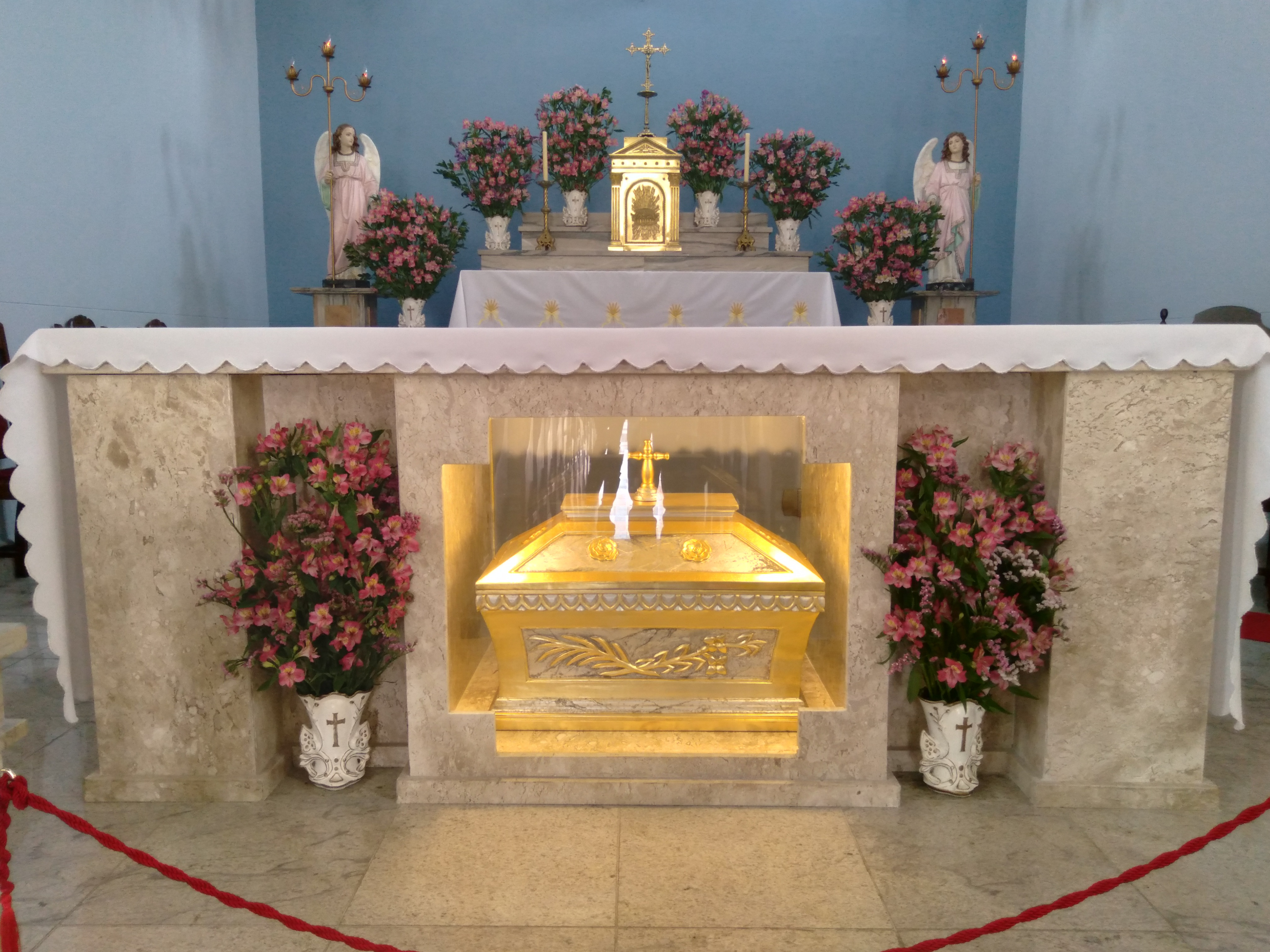
Altar of the chapel of Blessed Isabel Cristina, where her relics rest

Isabel Cristina Mrad Campos was born on 29 July 1962 in Barbacena to José Mendes Campos and Helena Mrad. Her baptism was celebrated on 15 August in the local parish church of Nossa Senhora da Piedade in Barbacena; she received her confirmation on 22 April 1965 in the Basílica São José Operário and her First Communion on 26 October 1969 at the school of the Daughters of Charity of Saint Vincent de Paul.

Mrad Campos, affectionately known as "Cris", studied at the Immaculata College that the Vincentian Sisters managed, becoming known for her kindness and for her above-average intelligence that set her apart from her peers. During this time, she often helped the poor or the old, providing them with food or other essential supplies. During this period, she joined the Young Vincentians which came under the umbrella of the main group. Her goal in life was to become a pediatrician to care for poor children, also hoping to do this in Africa.

On 15 August 1982, she relocated to Juiz de Fora alongside her brother Roberto to a small rented apartment that was located near the church and school where Mrad Campos was to take her medical entrance examination. Upon moving in, she immediately began cleaning it and purchasing new furnishings. However, on 30 August, she hired the tradesman Maurilio Almeida Oliveira to install a new wardrobe since he was reputable, reliable, and had reasonable prices for his services. The two began having a conversation, however, she grew gradually uncomfortable at his many suggestive comments, asking her to go on a date with him, despite her asking him to finish his work promptly and telling him that she was not interested. He then told her that he needed to leave to get a missing part so that he could install it either the next day or the one after that. After her brother returned, she told him of the encounter.

Almeida Oliveira returned on 1 September and attacked her in an attempt to rape her. He grabbed her and hit her with a chair before he gagged her with sheets and tied her up before he ripped at her clothes. Mrad Campos fought him and tried to call for help before he raised the volume on the radio and television to drown out her cries. He grew frustrated at her resistance before he stabbed her fifteen times before fleeing. Her brother discovered the body later that evening; the investigation determined she was never raped throughout the ordeal. She had thirteen stab wounds in the back and two in the groin.

== Beatification ==
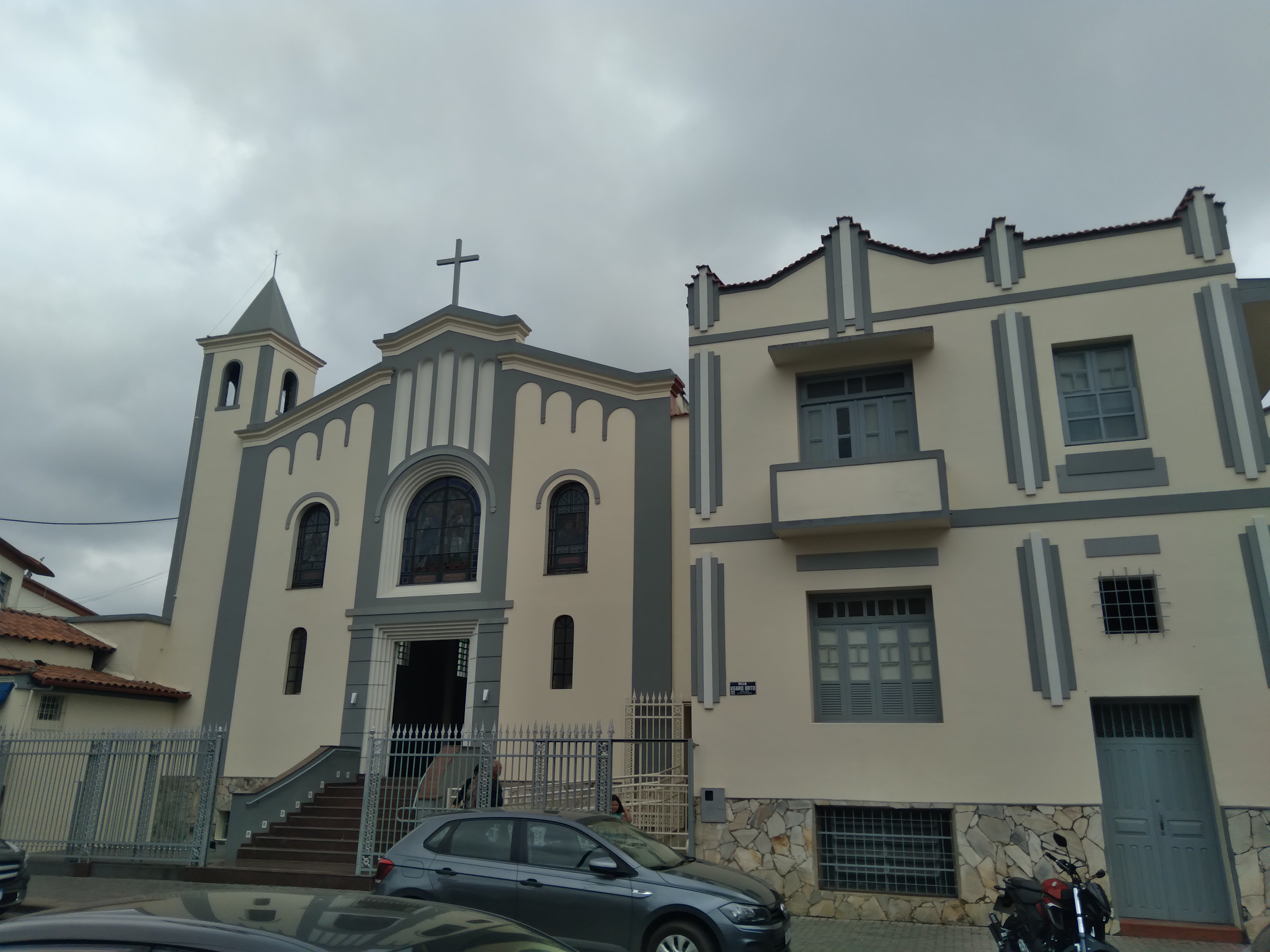
Chapel and memorial of Blessed Isabel Cristina in Barbacena, Minas Gerais

The diocesan process opened in Mariana on 26 January 2001 before concluding nearly a decade later on 1 September 2009. Pope Francis authorized a decree on 27 October 2020 that determined that Mrad Campos had died in odium fidei ("in hatred of the faith") and in defensum castitatis (in defense of her chastity) and approved for her to be beatified. The beatification took place in Barbacena on 10 December 2022. The postulator for this cause is Doctor Paolo Vilotta.
