= Sobral Pinto =

Brazilian lawyer (1893–1991)

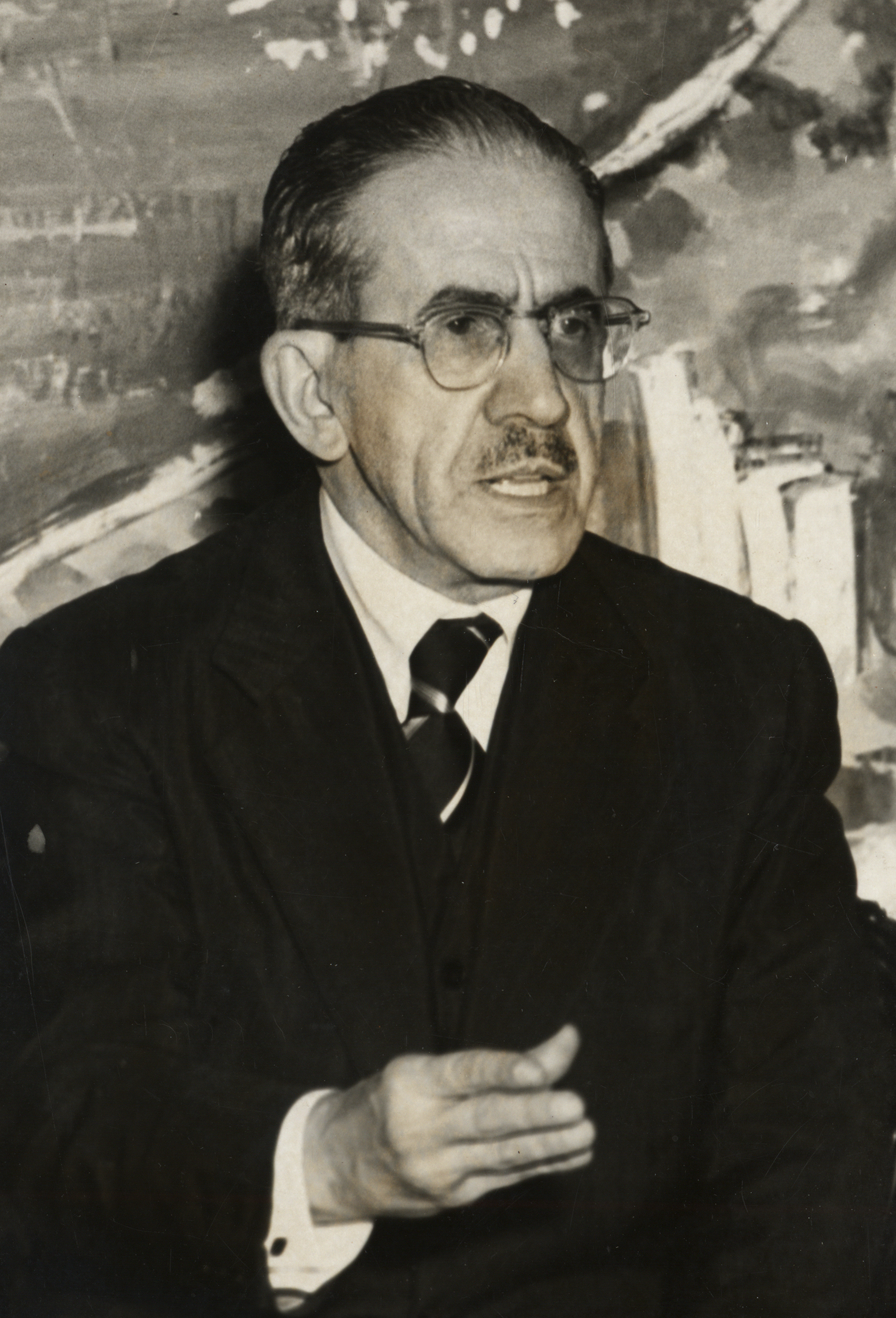
- Born: 5 November 1893; Barbacena, Minas Gerais, Brazil
- Died: 30 November 1991 (aged 98); Rio de Janeiro, Brazil
- Education: Federal University of Rio de Janeiro (LL.B.)
- Occupations: Jurist and attorney

Heráclito Fontoura Sobral Pinto (5 November 1893 – Rio de Janeiro, 30 November 1991) was a Brazilian lawyer known for his human rights activism and devout Catholicism. He strongly opposed dictator Getúlio Vargas and worked against Brazil's later military regime following the military coup of 1964.

He was a staunch defender of human rights, especially during the Estado Novo dictatorship of Getúlio Vargas and the military dictatorship in Brazil (1964-1985) that was established after the 1964 coup. He graduated from the National Law School of the Federal University of Rio de Janeiro.

One of his most memorable quotes is "Law is not a profession for cowards".

== Early life ==
He was born on 5 November 1893 in Barbacena, Minas Gerais, to Príamo Cavalcanti Sobral Pinto, a station master working for the Central do Brasil railroad in the town, and his wife Idalina.

Although he started his career as a lawyer in the area of Private Law, he ended up becoming notable as a brilliant criminalist defending the politically persecuted. Despite being a fervent Catholic (he went to mass every morning), he agreed to defend Luís Carlos Prestes, who had been arrested after the communist uprising of 1935.

In the case of the German Harry Berger, who had also been arrested and severely tortured after the same uprising, Sobral Pinto demanded that the government apply Article 14 of the Animal Protection Act to the prisoner, a very unusual fact.

He also gained renown when he defended the Copacabana Palace Hotel when it opened. The hotel had been planned to open in 1922, on the occasion of the Centenary of the Independence of Brazil, but this was delayed and it opened in 1924; in this period there was the first attempt by the Brazilian government to boycott gambling in casino institutions; the Guinle family, owner of the hotel, had invested a fortune in the casino, and did not spare another fortune (5 thousand contos de réis) to hire Sobral Pinto, who presented the illegitimacy of the ban, with hoteliers having the right to have a casino in the hotel. Such was the legal weight of this defense that the ban was lifted and the casino license extended.

At the end of his career, he refused President Juscelino Kubitschek 's invitation to assume a post of minister of the Federal Supreme Court, so that they would not assume that his defense of the president's inauguration had been motivated by personal interest.

During the military dictatorship, still under the AI-5, Sobral Pinto was honored at the São Paulo City Council by the São Paulo Lawyers Institute in October 1976. In his acceptance speech, he said about the 64 coup: "Military coup. It was not Revolution. There was no superior idea in that movement; there was no purpose in that movement to really work for the culture and progress of the country".

During the political opening phase in the early 1980s, he participated in "Diretas Já" ("direct vote now!"), a political movement for the return of democracy. In 1984, he caused a sensation by participating in the historic "Comício da Candelária" (Candelaria Assembly, another political demonstration took place in 1984 in front of the Candelária Church in Rio de Janeiro, calling for the return of democracy), and defending the re-establishment of direct elections for the presidency of the Republic, reading the first article of the Federal Constitution of Brazil (1988), as a tribute to his work for democracy, João Nogueira and Paulo César Pinheiro composed the song "Vovô Sobral" ("Granpa Sobral") in his honor, released on the 1984 album "Pelas Terras do Pau-Brasil" ("Through the lands of Redwoods"). The song features a bass line by Luizão Maia.

He was also active in the work of the Bar Association, being a federal counselor for the Bar Association of Brazil (amazon section - OAB/MA) in the 1981/1983 administration, and was a counselor for his favorite soccer club, America Football Club, in Rio de Janeiro.

In 2013, the documentary Sobral – The Man Who Didn't Have Price was released, which shows the biography of the jurist in the trajectory of the defense of human rights in Brazil, directed by Paula Fiuza.

== See also ==
- Documentary "Sobral – O Homem que Não Tinha Preço" -

== Bibliography ==
- Dulles, John W. F. (2002) Sobral Pinto, "The Conscience of Brazil": leading the attack against Vargas (1930-1945). Austin: University of Texas Press. ISBN 978-0-292-71616-2
- Dulles, John W. F. (2007) Resisting Brazil's Military Regime: an account of the battles of Sobral Pinto. Austin: University of Texas Press. ISBN 978-0-292-71725-1
