= Janat =

French tea company

Janat Paris
- Type: Private Company
- Industry: Food & Beverage
- Founded: 1872; 154 years ago
- Founder: Janat Dores
- Headquarters: Paris, France
- Number of locations: 1 tea shop in Paris, 1 tea shop in Tokyo (2021)
- Area served: France, Japan, Dubai, Bahrain
- Products: Tea
- Website: janatea.com

Janat Paris is a French Tea Company established in 1872 and based in the 15th arrondissement of Paris, France. Founded by Janat Dores.

== History ==
Janat Dores travelled from the port of Marseille to parts of the new world to bring back an assortment of tea, spices, cocoa and coffee. In 1889, the opening of the Eiffel Tower further established his tea business, strengthened by his friendship with Gustave Eiffel. The friendship inspired Janat Dores to create various tea brewing techniques which drove the brand to develop the world's first oak barrel through tea ageing and flavouring.

== Products ==
Janat Paris produces a range of tea products, including black, flavoured and specialty teas.

French Oak Tea: The company has developed the oak barrel–aged tea, a method where tea leaves are matured in French oak casks to develop enhanced and distinctive flavour characteristics.

Pomme d’Amour: A flavoured black tea inspired by tarte Tatin, an apple dessert created by the Tatin sisters around 1889.

Janat Paris has also developed specialty teas presented at international auctions, including one recognised by Guinness World Records as the most expensive tea sold at auction in 2025.

== Women Empowerment ==
=== Femmes Du Monde ===
Janat Paris supports initiatives related to women’s empowerment through its collaboration with the "Femmes du Monde" foundation. The foundation aims to improve working conditions for tea leaf pickers and promote women’s independence and entrepreneurship.

=== Tea For Two ===
In 2016, the brand launched a program called “Tea for Two” in Tokyo. The purpose of the project is to raise awareness of women’s empowerment. A free cup of tea is offered to women from each and every Janat Paris tea product purchased. To help develop this project, Janat uses its branded Yellow Tea Caravan and travels to Paris, Bahrain, Dubai and Tokyo. Janat also participates regularly in events such as The Yosakoi Oedo Soran Festival in 2016, the Hope and Love Day in 2016 and a concert with Jeff Mills in 2017.

== Distribution ==
Janat distributes its tea through its retail locations and promotional initiatives, including the “Tea for Two” caravan program. The brand opened its first tea shop in Paris and later established a tea salon in Tokyo’s Omotesandō avenue.

The company has also expanded its presence through hospitality partnerships. Janat teas have been served in a number of hotels in the United Arab Emirates, including properties managed by international hotel groups.

Janat participated in Expo 2020 Dubai, where it presented installations including an Eiffel Tower–inspired tea station and exhibited a section of the original Eiffel Tower staircase as part of its brand heritage.

In the Philippines, Janat Paris has participated in cultural and promotional activities in collaboration with local partners and including initiatives with Ayala Malls. The brand has also been involved in events in Manila highlighting its heritage and social initiatives, particularly those focused on women’s empowerment.

== Awards ==
Several products from Janat received awards from the International Taste Institute:

| Year | Institution | Award | Product |
| 2020 | International Taste Institute | Superior taste award (3 stars) | Janat Oak Tea |
| 2020 | International Taste Institute | Superior taste award (2 stars) | Pomme d'amour Tea |
| 2020 | International Taste Institute | Superior taste award (2 stars) | Golden Moon Chai |
| 2021 | International Taste Institute | Superior taste award (2 stars) | Earl Grey 50 Tea Bags - Heritage Serie |

== Records ==
In 2025, Janat was recognized by Guinness World Records for the most expensive tea sold at auction, following the sale of a rare tea at a record-breaking price of JP¥1,250,000. Auction jointly held by the tea board of Sri Lanka and the Japan Tea Association in Osaka, Japan.
