= Senhora dos Remédios =

Town and municipality in the state of Minas Gerais, Brazil

Coordinates: 21°01′40″S 43°34′58″W

- Municipality
- Interactive map of Senhora dos Remédios
- Country: Brazil
- State: Minas Gerais
- Region: Southeast

Population (2022 Census)
  - Total: 10,384
  - Estimate (2025): 10,657
- Time zone: UTC−3 (BRT)

Location of Senhora dos Remédios within Minas Gerais

Senhora dos Remédios is a Brazilian municipality located in the state of Minas Gerais. The city belongs to the mesoregion of Campo das Vertentes and to the microregion of Barbacena. In 2025, the estimated population was 10,657.

== See also ==
- List of municipalities in Minas Gerais
