= Brazilian anti-asylum movement =

Sociopolitical movement advocating for humanitarian reforms of psychiatry in Brazil

The anti-asylum movement or anti-asylum fight (Portuguese: movimento antimanicomial) is an organized movement in Brazil consisting of psychiatrists, psychologists and social workers requesting a humanitarian improvement in psychiatrist public services. University campuses, hospitals and workers of the field promote events in order to raise awareness and fight discrimination against mental patients.

== Origins ==
The movement itself was born after a chain of worldwide political events and is celebrated on May 18 in Brazil. On May 18, 1987, about 350 employees of Mental Health reunited in the Brazilian city of Bauru, state of São Paulo in order to discuss and propose ways to change the archaic and inefficient Mental Health System in the country.

In its roots, the movement is connected to the Reforma Sanitária Brasileira (Brazilian Sanitary Reform) whose outcome was the Sistema Único de Saúde (SUS) ("Unified Health System"). It's also related to deinstitutionalisation of Psychiatry developed in the cities of Gorizia and Trieste in Italy, by Italian psychiatrist Franco Basaglia in the 1960s.

== Goals ==
As a crucial part of its ongoing movement, Psychiatric Reform took place under Law 10216 of 2001 (Lei Paulo Delgado) seeking reformulation of the current model adopted by Mental Asylums, changing the focus of the treatment from systematic hospitalization to a more Psychosocial approach, including community and open services. According to the Brazilian anti-Asylum movement, public healthcare and mental health is a political and social complex process, composed by participants, institutions and actions of different sources taking place in many territories. It's a conjuncture of transformations in practices, knowledge, cultural and social values whose responsibility belongs not only to the hospital but also the government and people in interpersonal relationships. Therefore, the treatment is supposed to be held in a community base and the patients shall be given protection and receive proper treatment according to the Universal Declaration of Human Rights.

Their agenda aims a change in the belief that mental disorders are treated solely with medications and institutionalization. It launches a campaign against the prejudice and discrimination faced by patients, whose identity and virtues are often ignored in the process, giving then importance to psychotherapy and dialogue, distancing those placed under care from stressful environments while integrating them with family, friends and significant others. Anti-asylum movement is also responsible for the privilege given to stable patients to have freedom to transit in and out the institution while sleeping in their own homes.

== Results ==
The conditions of mental health in Brazil improved slightly, as the Psychiatric Institutionalization is still not over and many hospitals across the country still haven't adapted themselves to the new regent laws. A considerable amount of asylums were transformed into Centers of Psychosocial Attention (Brazilian Portuguese: "Centros de Atenção Psicossocial", simply known as "CAPS").

=== External links ===
- CRP of São Paulo on Week of Anti-Asylum Awareness (Portuguese only)
- The anti-asylum movement in Brazil by Lígia Helena Hahn Lüchmann and J. Rodrigues
- Psychiatric Reform - Centro Cultural Ministério da Saúde (Portuguese only)
- Anti-asylum movement on Portuguese Wikipedia
