= Dores de Guanhães =

Coordinates: 19°03′S 42°57′W

- Municipality
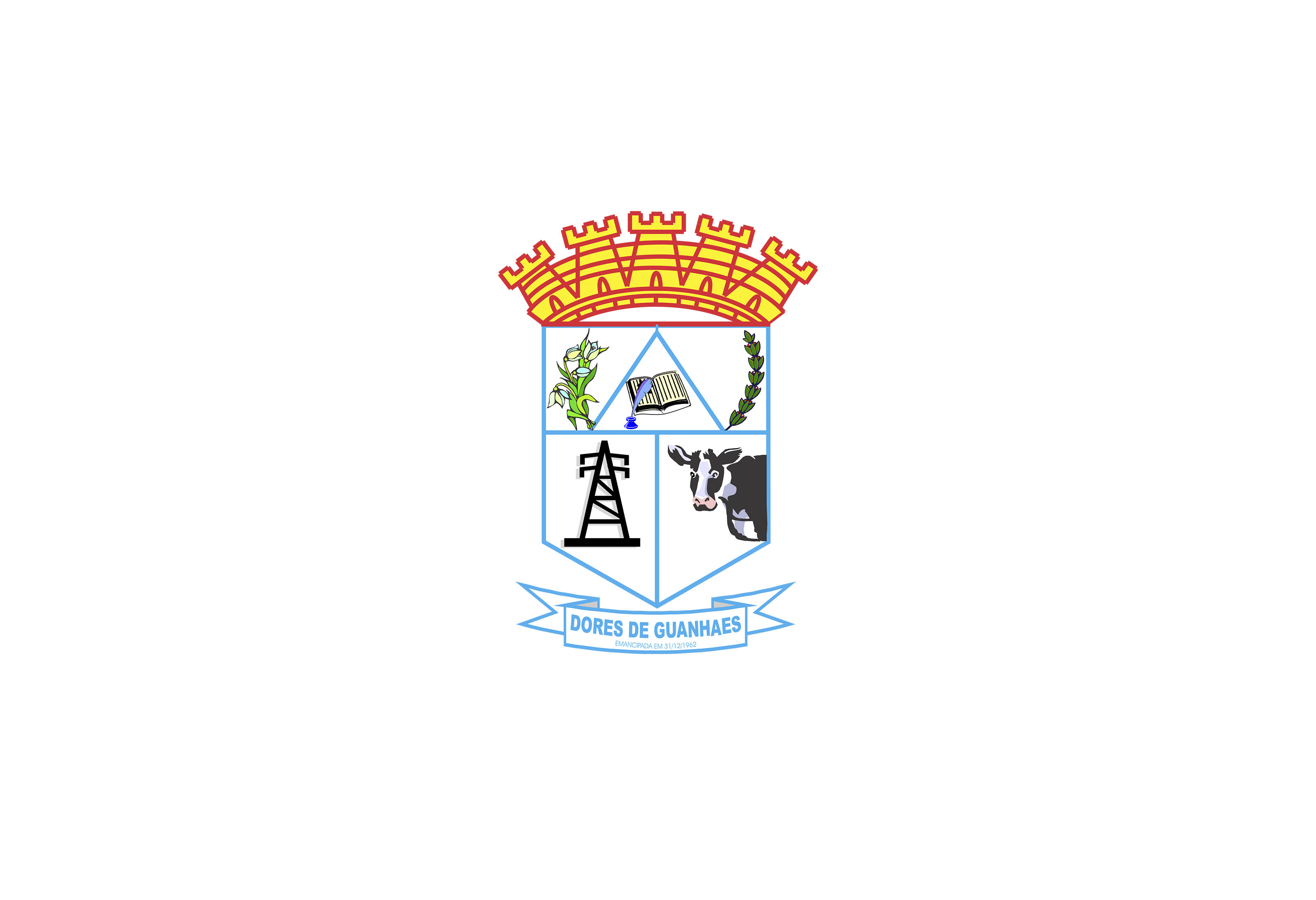
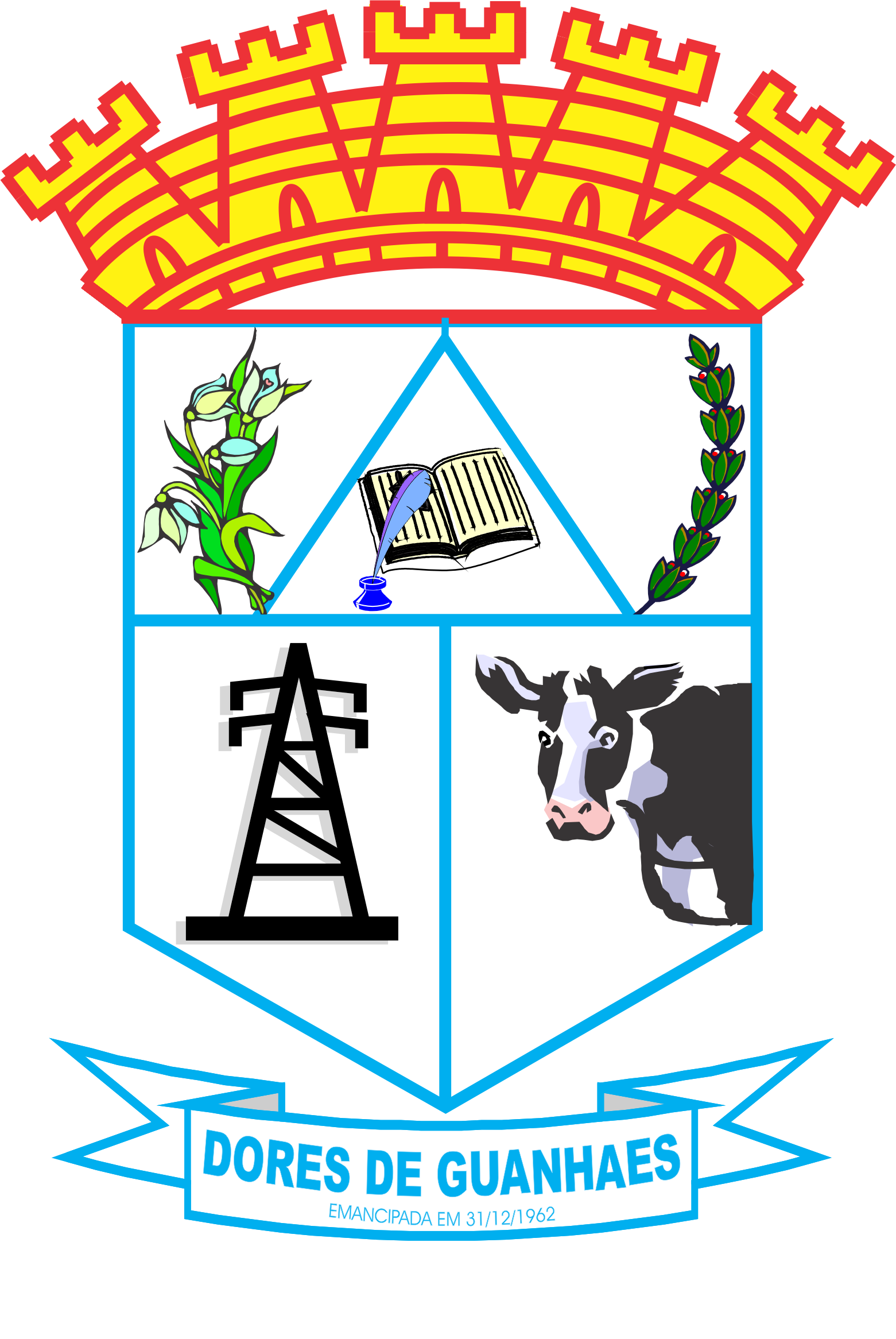
- Flag Coat of arms
- Interactive map of Dores de Guanhães
- Country: Brazil
- Region: Southeast
- State: Minas Gerais
- Mesoregion: Vale do Rio Doce

Population (2022 Census)
  - Total: 5,029
  - Estimate (2025): 5,114
- Time zone: UTC−3 (BRT)

Dores de Guanhães is a municipality in the state of Minas Gerais in the Southeast region of Brazil.

== See also ==
- List of municipalities in Minas Gerais
