= Joaquim Floriano de Godoy =

Brazilian doctor and politician

Joaquim Floriano de Godóy (born São Paulo, 4 January 1826, died 20 November 1907) was a Brazilian medical doctor and politician. He was general member of the House of Representatives, President of Minas Gerais province, and Senator of the Empire of Brazil from 1873 to 1889.

The above information is taken from the Portuguese Wikipedia article on the subject.
