= Santa Rita de Ibitipoca =

- Municipality
- Location in Brazil
- Coordinates: 21°33′46″S 43°54′54″W
- Country: Brazil
- Region: Southeast
- State: Minas Gerais
- Mesoregion: Vale do Rio Doce

Population (2022 Census)
  - Total: 3,301
  - Estimate (2025): 3,331
- Time zone: UTC−3 (BRT)

Santa Rita de Ibitipoca is a municipality in the state of Minas Gerais in the Southeast region of Brazil.

== See also ==
- List of municipalities in Minas Gerais
