= Dores de Campos =

Coordinates: 21°06′S 44°02′W

Brasilia
- Municipality
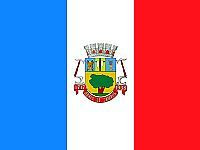
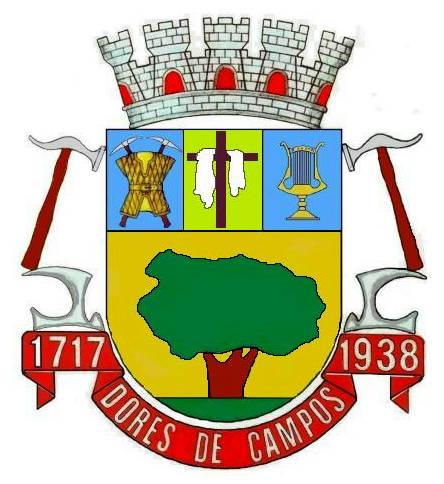
- Flag Coat of arms

- Localization in Minas Gerais
- Country: Brazil
- Region: Southeast
- State: Minas Gerais
- Incorporated: December 17, 1938

Government
  - Mayor: Ilídio Antonio de Melo Neto

Area
  - Total: 1,437 km^{2} (555 sq mi)
- Elevation: 956 m (3,136 ft)

Population (2022 Census)
  - Total: 10,007
  - Estimate (2025): 10,359
  - Density: 71.8/km^{2} (186/sq mi)
- Time zone: UTC−3 (BRT)
- Website: Dores de Campos.com

Dores de Campos is a Brazilian municipality. It is about 40 kilometers from São João del Rey at BR-265. About 30% of active people work in its principal factory: Marluvas.

As its neighbors cities, Dores de Campos is a point of Real Way (translated of Estrada Real).

It was founded in about 1720 and became a city on December 17, 1938.

== Geography ==
According to IBGE (2017), the municipality is in the Immediate Geographic Region of Barbacena, in the Intermediate Geographic Region of Barbacena.

=== Ecclesiastical circumscription ===
The municipality is part of the Roman Catholic Diocese of São João del-Rei.

== See also ==
- List of municipalities in Minas Gerais
