= Antônio Carlos, Minas Gerais =

Town and municipality in the state of Minas Gerais, Brazil

Coordinates: 21°19′04″S 43°44′49″W

Antônio Carlos
- Municipality
- Municipality of Antônio Carlos
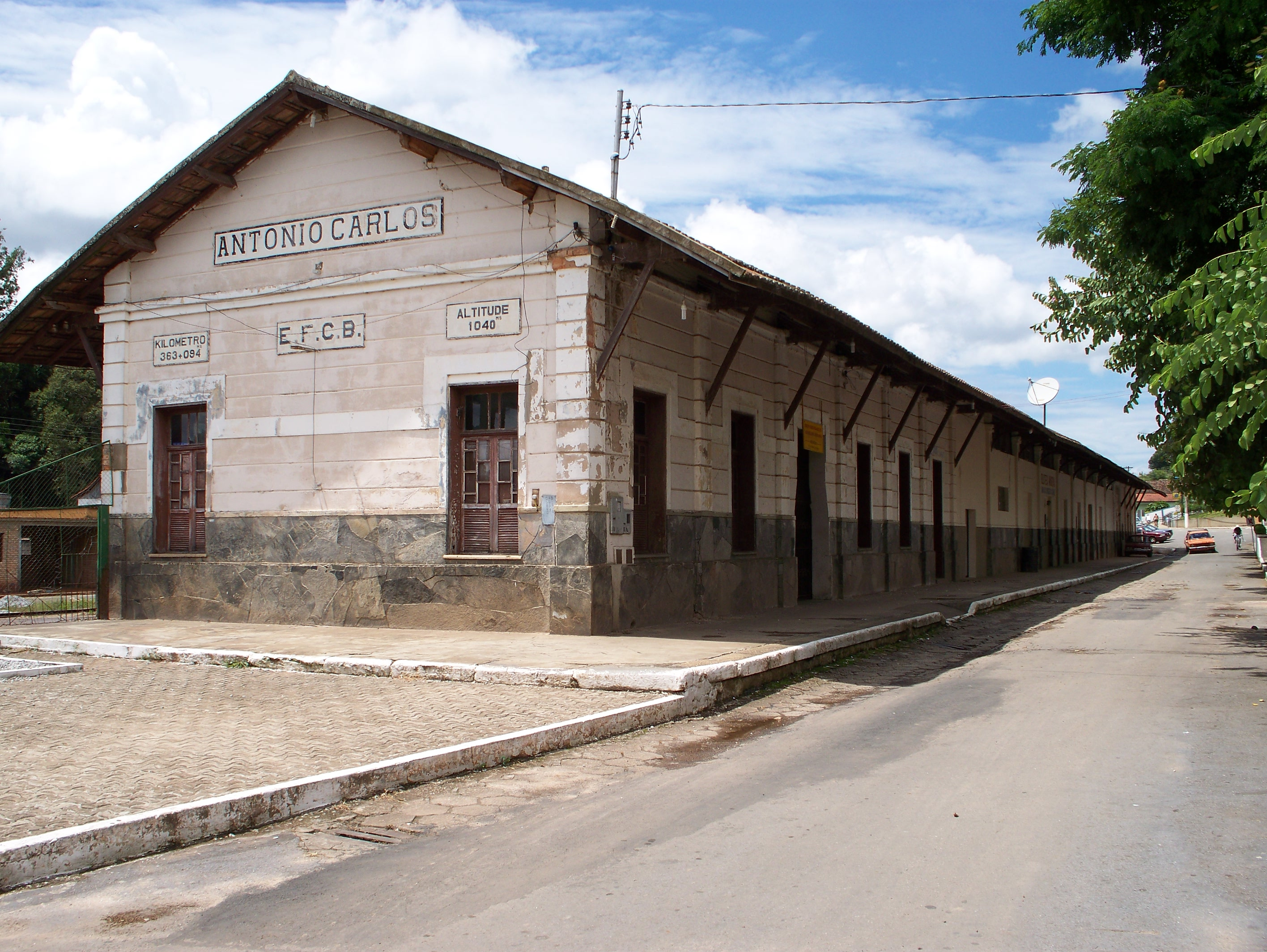

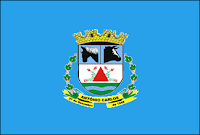
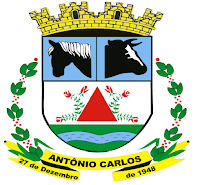
- Flag Coat of arms

- Location in Minas Gerais
- Country: Brazil
- State: Minas Gerais
- Region: Southeast
- Intermediate Region: Barbacena
- Immediate Region: Barbacena
- Founded: 27 December 1947

Government
  - Mayor: Marcelo Ribeiro da Silva (PSDB)

Area
  - Total: 529.915 km^{2} (204.601 sq mi)
- Elevation: 1,058 m (3,471 ft)

Population (2022 Census)
  - Total: 11,095
  - Estimate (2025): 11,350
  - Density: 20.937/km^{2} (54.227/sq mi)
- Demonym: antônio-carlense
- Time zone: UTC−3 (BRT)
- Postal Code: 36220-000 to 36224-999
- HDI (2010): 0.683 – medium
- Website: municipioantoniocarlos.mg.gov.br/2018/

Antônio Carlos is a Brazilian municipality located in the state of Minas Gerais. Its population as of 2020 was 11,459 people living in an area of 530 km^{2} (200 sq mi). The elevation is 1,058 meters. The city belongs to the mesoregion of Campo das Vertentes and to the microregion of Barbacena. The important regional center of Barbacena lies 13 km to the north and is connected by highway MG-135. Antônio Carlos is on the railroad line that connects with Juiz de Fora.

== See also ==
- List of municipalities in Minas Gerais
