= Barbacena =

- Municipality
- Municipality of Barbacena
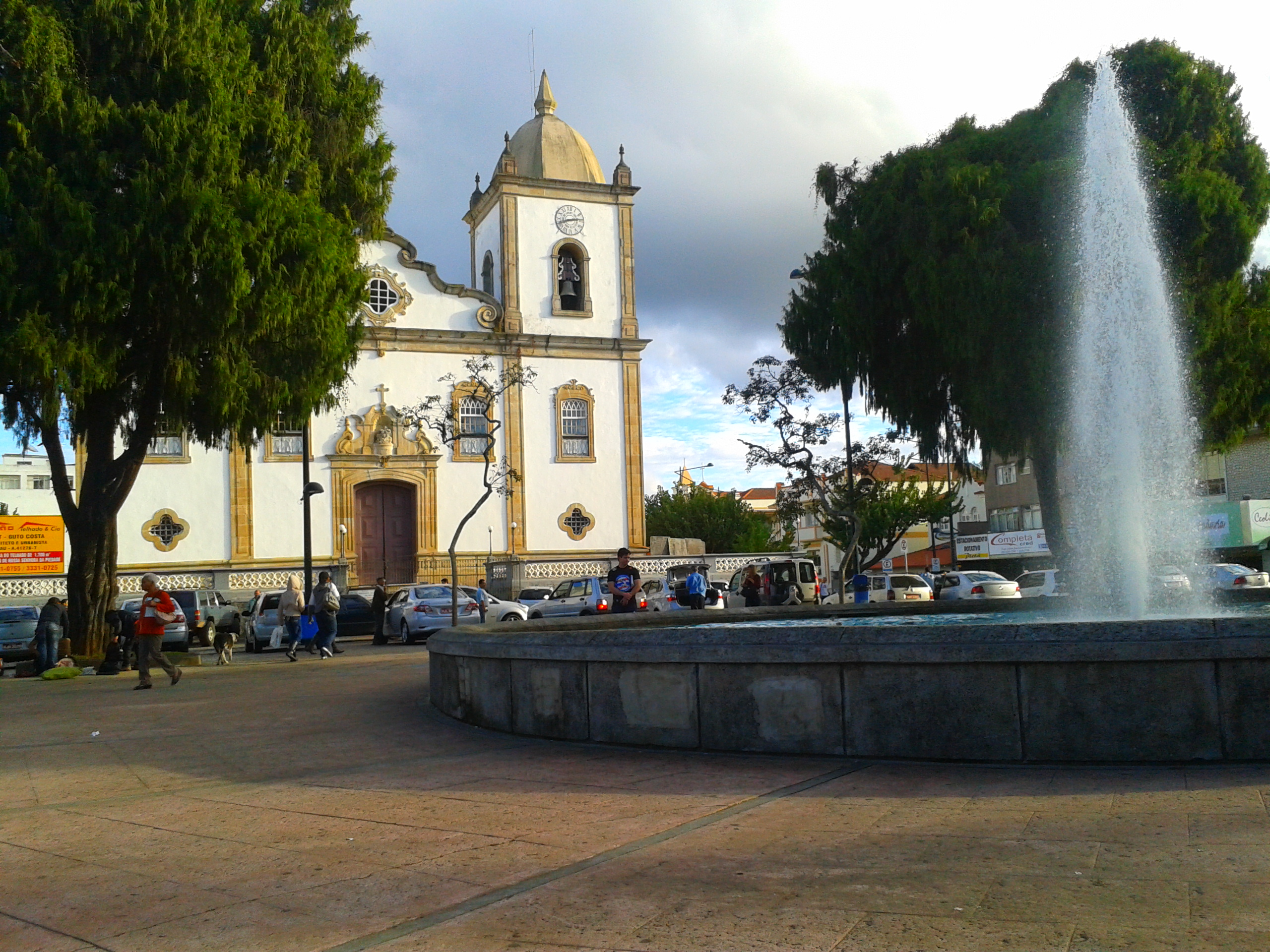
- Andradas Square

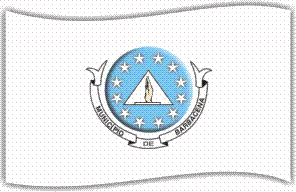
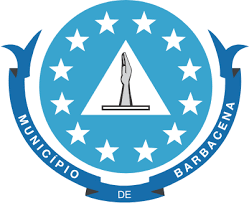
- Flag Coat of arms
- Nickname: "BQ"
- Location in Minas Gerais
- Coordinates: 21°13′S 43°46′W
- Country: Brazil
- State: Minas Gerais
- Region: Southeast
- Intermediate Region: Barbacena
- Immediate Region: Barbacena
- Founded: 1791

Government
  - Mayor: Carlos Augusto Soares do Nascimento (MDB)

Area
  - Total: 759.19 km^{2} (293.12 sq mi)
- Elevation: 1,160 m (3,810 ft)

Population (2022 Census)
  - Total: 125,317
  - Estimate (2025): 129,695
  - Density: 158/km^{2} (410/sq mi)
- Demonym: Barbacenense
- Time zone: UTC-3 (UTC-3)
  - Summer (DST): UTC-2 (UTC-2)
- Postal code: 36200
- Area code: (+55) 32
- HDI (2010): 0.769 – high
- Website: www.barbacena.mg.gov.br

Barbacena is a municipality in the state of Minas Gerais, Brazil. As of 2022 Census, the municipality had 125,317 inhabitants. The total area of the municipality is 788 km^{2} (304 sq mi).

Barbacena is known for its strong Italian influence. The Rodrigo Silva Colonial Nucleus was established in the late 19th century, and the immigration process lasted until the early 20th century. Most of the immigrants came from the Veneto region. Currently, Rodrigo Silva colonial nucleus is part of the territory of the city of Antônio Carlos (separated from Barbacena in 1948) and of the homonymous neighborhood "Colônia".

It is in the foothills of the Serra da Mantiqueira south of the state capital Belo Horizonte at an elevation of 1,136 m (3,727 ft), making it one of the ten highest cities in Brazil. Located on the important BR-040 highway (also called Rodovia JK), which links Brasília to Rio de Janeiro, it is 165 km (103 mi) from the state capital and 97 km (60 mi) from Juiz de Fora.

Barbacena has a humid tropical climate with cool summers due to the elevation. Summer averages are 24 °C (75 °F) and winter averages 13 °C (55 °F). The cool climate and abundant rainfall have made Barbacena a center for flower production – the city is the biggest producer of flowers in Minas Gerais, and is nicknamed "City of Roses". Cattle raising and the dairy industry are quite developed and the city is a big producer of milk products; there are also several small textile factories.

Barbacena is also the home of the Preparatory School of Air Cadets (the sixteenth best high school of the country, which belongs to the Brazilian Air Force) and of a Medical School, Faculdade de Medicina de Barbacena (Faculty of Medicine of Barbacena). The city is also famous for the Hospital Colônia de Barbacena, a mental hospital founded in 1903, which was known for its abusive treatment of patients. According to sources, 70% of the patients did not have mental illness, and allegedly 60,000 people died in the hospital. It ceased operations in the mid-1980s. It has been compared to a Nazi concentration camp.

Barbacena was the birthplace of the human rights activist and lawyer Heráclito Fontoura Sobral Pinto. Barbacena is also known for being the hometown of student Isabel Cristina Mrad Campos, beatified in December 2022 by the Catholic Church.

Barbacena was a station on the Estrada de Ferro Oeste de Minas, a narrow gauge railway.

== Geography ==
According to the modern (2017) geographic classification by Brazil's National Institute of Geography and Statistics (IBGE), the municipality belongs to the Immediate Geographic Region of Barbacena, in the Intermediate Geographic Region of Barbacena.

== History ==
Barbacena was founded on 14 August 1791.

In the 19th century, Barbacena was a principal distribution center for the mining districts of Minas Gerais, but this distinction was lost when the railways were extended beyond that point.

== Sister cities ==
Barbacena has one sister city, as designated by Sister Cities International:

- (United States) Burlington, Iowa, USA

== In popular culture ==
=== Literature ===
- Quincas Borba, by Machado de Assis.

== Climate ==
Climate data for Barbacena (1981–2010 normals, extremes 1961–present)
Month	Jan	Feb	Mar	Apr	May	Jun	Jul	Aug	Sep	Oct	Nov	Dec	Year
Record high °C (°F)	33.8 (92.8)	33.4 (92.1)	32.8 (91.0)	30.8 (87.4)	29.6 (85.3)	29.2 (84.6)	29.6 (85.3)	32.8 (91.0)	34.1 (93.4)	34.6 (94.3)	34.7 (94.5)	33.0 (91.4)	34.7 (94.5)
Mean daily maximum °C (°F)	27.1 (80.8)	27.7 (81.9)	26.8 (80.2)	25.5 (77.9)	23.3 (73.9)	22.8 (73.0)	22.7 (72.9)	24.0 (75.2)	24.4 (75.9)	25.7 (78.3)	25.7 (78.3)	26.4 (79.5)	25.2 (77.4)
Daily mean °C (°F)	21.0 (69.8)	21.1 (70.0)	20.5 (68.9)	19.0 (66.2)	16.8 (62.2)	15.8 (60.4)	15.4 (59.7)	16.5 (61.7)	17.6 (63.7)	19.2 (66.6)	19.6 (67.3)	20.4 (68.7)	18.6 (65.5)
Mean daily minimum °C (°F)	16.8 (62.2)	16.6 (61.9)	16.3 (61.3)	14.7 (58.5)	12.2 (54.0)	10.6 (51.1)	10.2 (50.4)	10.9 (51.6)	12.7 (54.9)	14.5 (58.1)	15.6 (60.1)	16.4 (61.5)	14.0 (57.2)
Record low °C (°F)	10.9 (51.6)	10.9 (51.6)	9.9 (49.8)	6.8 (44.2)	2.9 (37.2)	0.3 (32.5)	1.0 (33.8)	1.8 (35.2)	3.2 (37.8)	5.7 (42.3)	7.1 (44.8)	8.7 (47.7)	0.3 (32.5)
Average precipitation mm (inches)	290.6 (11.44)	156.0 (6.14)	178.2 (7.02)	65.0 (2.56)	38.8 (1.53)	17.7 (0.70)	11.9 (0.47)	18.5 (0.73)	76.1 (3.00)	126.7 (4.99)	208.8 (8.22)	269.7 (10.62)	1,458 (57.40)
Average precipitation days (≥ 1.0 mm)	17	11	13	6	4	2	2	3	6	10	15	18	107
Average relative humidity (%)	83.0	81.9	83.9	82.8	82.3	80.0	77.4	73.7	76.3	78.6	83.2	84.4	80.6
Mean monthly sunshine hours	140.4	169.2	146.8	162.4	147.4	146.2	165.7	177.5	136.5	148.9	128.8	123.9	1,793.7
Source: Instituto Nacional de Meteorologia
